= FBI Ten Most Wanted Fugitives, 2010s =

FBI ten most wanted list

The FBI's Ten Most Wanted Fugitives during the 2010s is a list, maintained for a seventh decade, of the Ten Most Wanted Fugitives of the United States Federal Bureau of Investigation. At any given time, the FBI is actively searching for 12,000 fugitives. During the 2010s, 29 new fugitives were added to the list. By the close of the decade a total of 523 fugitives had been listed on the Top Ten list, of whom 488 have been captured or located.

== FBI Ten Most Wanted Fugitives to begin the 2010s ==
The modern header with blue border used by the FBI on top Ten Fugitive wanted posters since at least 2002, on both the FBI internet web site and in public presentations of the wanted posters.

The FBI in the past has identified individuals by the sequence number in which each individual has appeared on the list. Some individuals have even appeared twice, and often a sequence number was permanently assigned to an individual suspect who was soon caught, captured, or simply removed, before his or her appearance could be published on the publicly released list. In those cases, the public would see only gaps in the number sequence reported by the FBI. For convenient reference, the wanted suspect's sequence number and date of entry on the FBI list appear below, whenever possible.

The following fugitives made up the top Ten list to begin the 2010s:

Name	Sequence Number	Date of Entry	Notes
Víctor Manuel Gerena	#386	1984	• Still at large but removed from the list. • Wanted in connection with the 1983 armed robbery of approximately $7 million from a security company in Connecticut. • He was removed from the list on December 15, 2016, after being on the list for 32 years, seven months and a day—a record.
Glen Stewart Godwin	#447	1996	• Still at large but removed from the list. • Escaped from Folsom State Prison in California in 1987, where he was serving a lengthy sentence for murder; apprehended in Mexico and murdered a fellow prison inmate in Mexico before escaping from a Mexican prison in September 1991. • He was removed from the list in May 2016 as FBI officials believed that publicity would not assist with his capture.
Osama bin Laden	#456	1999	• Killed. • Osama bin Laden was the leader of al-Qaeda and was wanted in connection with the August 7, 1998, bombings of the United States embassies (Dar es Salaam, Tanzania and Nairobi, Kenya) and the September 11 attacks. Bin Laden and al-Qaeda are alleged to be responsible for the October 12, 2000 attack on the USS Cole off the coast of Yemen. • Killed during Operation Neptune Spear in Abbottabad, Pakistan, on May 2, 2011.
James J. Bulger	#458	1999	• Captured/Dead • Wanted for his role in 18 murders committed from the early 1970s through the mid-1980s in connection with his leadership of an organized crime group that allegedly controlled extortion, drug deals, and other illegal activities in the Boston, Massachusetts area. • Arrested on June 22, 2011, in Santa Monica, California.
Robert William Fisher	#475	2002	• Still at large but removed from the list. • Wanted for murder of his wife and their two children in Scottsdale, Arizona on April 10, 2001. • He was removed from the list on November 3, 2021, for no longer meeting the list criteria.
Alexis Flores	#487	2007	• Removed from the list but later captured. • Wanted for kidnapping and killing a 5-year-old girl in Philadelphia, Pennsylvania. • He was removed from the list on March 6, 2025, for no longer meeting the list criteria. • Arrested on February 11, 2026, in Honduras.
Jason Derek Brown	#489	2007	• Still at large but removed from the list. • Allegedly killed an armored car guard in Phoenix, Arizona during a bank robbery. • He was removed from the list on September 7, 2022, for no longer meeting the list criteria.
Joe Luis Saenz	#492	2009	• Captured. • Wanted for multiple murders, including three in 1998 and one in 2008. • Arrested on November 22, 2012, in Guadalajara, Mexico.
Eduardo Ravelo	#493	2009	• Captured. • Leader of the Barrio Azteca gang in Mexico; wanted for several crimes involving murder and drugs. • Captured in Mexico, the FBI announced on June 26, 2018.
Semion Mogilevich	#494	2009	• Still at large but removed from the list. • Alleged organized crime leader; wanted for running a financial scam in Pennsylvania. • He was removed from the list on December 17, 2015, for no longer meeting the list criteria, which includes the publicity to aid in fugitive apprehension and is a continued danger to the community. Mogilevich lives in Russia, which does not have an extradition treaty with the United States.

== FBI Ten Most Wanted Fugitives added during the 2010s ==
It took a year into the new decade before any of the fugitives were captured. The replacements were not named until 2012. The list includes (in FBI list appearance sequence order):

=== 2010 ===
No one was added to the list in 2010.

=== 2011 ===
No one was added to the list in 2011.

=== 2012 ===
Name	Sequence Number	Date of Entry	Time Listed
Eric Justin Toth	#495	April 10, 2012	One year
Eric Justin Toth was sought for possession and production of child pornography in Washington, D.C. It was alleged that pornographic images of children were found on a camera at the school where Toth worked. He was the last person known to have custody of the camera. Toth was captured by Nicaraguan authorities in Estelí on April 22, 2013.
Adam Christopher Mayes	#496	May 9, 2012	One day
Adam Christopher Mayes was accused of kidnapping a woman and her three daughters in Tennessee. The woman and one of the daughters were later found deceased in Mississippi. Mayes later died from a self-inflicted gunshot wound after police attempted to arrest him in Alpine, Mississippi. The two surviving children were recovered alive.
Fidel Urbina	#497	June 5, 2012	Four years
Fidel Urbina was wanted for allegedly beating and raping two women, killing one of them in Chicago, Illinois, in 1998. He was captured in Chihuahua, Mexico on September 22, 2016.

=== 2013 ===
Name	Sequence Number	Date of Entry	Time Listed
Edwin Ernesto Rivera Gracias	#498	March 14, 2013	Thirteen days
Edwin Ernesto Rivera Gracias was wanted for first-degree murder in the stabbing death of a 63-year-old Denver resident on August 17, 2011. He was arrested in San Salvador, El Salvador, on March 27, 2013.
José Manuel García Guevara	#499	June 17, 2013	One year
Jose Manuel Garcia Guevara was wanted for aggravated burglary, rape and murder of 26-year-old Wanda Barton of Lake Charles, Louisiana, on February 19, 2008. He surrendered in Mexico on July 30, 2014.
Walter Lee Williams	#500	June 17, 2013	One day
Walter Lee Williams was issued a federal arrest warrant in the United States District Court for the Central District of California for sexual exploitation of children, travel with intent to engage in illicit sexual conduct, engaging in illicit sexual conduct in foreign places, and criminal forfeiture. He was arrested in Playa del Carmen, Mexico, the day after he was put on the FBI Ten Most Wanted Fugitives list.

=== 2014 ===
Name	Sequence Number	Date of Entry	Time Listed
Juan Elias Garcia	#501	March 26, 2014	One day
Juan Elias Garcia, an MS-13 member, shot and killed his girlfriend and toddler in Central Islip, New York. He surrendered in Managua, Nicaragua, one day after he was put on the Ten Most Wanted List.
William Bradford Bishop	#502	April 10, 2014	Still at large but removed from the list
William Bradford Bishop is wanted for killing his mother, his wife, and his three sons in 1976 in Bethesda, Maryland. It is believed that he drove to North Carolina to dispose of the bodies and then fled to Europe. He was removed from the list on June 27, 2018.
Eric Frein	#503	September 18, 2014	42 days
Eric Frein was wanted for the 2014 Pennsylvania State Police barracks attack, which killed a Pennsylvania state trooper and injured another at the Blooming Grove Police Barracks on September 12, 2014. He was captured by U.S. Marshals outside of Tannersville, Pennsylvania, near an abandoned aircraft hangar on October 30, 2014.
Yaser Abdel Said	#504	December 4, 2014	Six years
Yaser Abdel Said, who was known to work as a taxi driver in Lewisville, Texas, was wanted for the New Year's Day 2008 murder of his two teenage daughters in his taxi cab. He was captured in Justin, Texas, on August 26, 2020.

=== 2015 ===
Name	Sequence Number	Date of Entry	Time Listed
Myloh Jaqory Mason	#505	December 17, 2015	29 days
Myloh Jaqory Mason was wanted for two bank robberies in Lakewood, Colorado, on September 30 and November 18, 2015. In the first robbery, he and two others, wearing masks and costumes resembling those from the movie Scream, allegedly shoved two bank tellers and told them they were going to die if they didn't open the bank vault. In the second robbery, while wearing skeleton masks, they supposedly brutalized the tellers while they were getting into the vault. During their escape, Mason and his accomplices allegedly shot two innocent people. He was captured at a Motel 6 in Thornton, Colorado, on January 15, 2016.

=== 2016 ===
Name	Sequence Number	Date of Entry	Time Listed
Brenda Delgado	#506	April 6, 2016	Two days
Brenda Delgado was wanted for masterminding a murder-for-hire plot of Dallas dentist Kendra Hatcher on September 2, 2015. Delgado was allegedly upset that Hatcher was seeing her former boyfriend. After the murder, Delgado fled to Mexico; she was captured in Torreon, Mexico, on April 8, 2016.
Philip Patrick Policarpio	#507	May 19, 2016	Nine days
Philip Patrick Policarpio was born in the Philippines and was wanted for the murder of his girlfriend, Lauren Elaine Olguin, who was seventeen weeks pregnant with his baby, in the Ramparts section of Los Angeles on April 12, 2016. Policarpio allegedly beat her, then shot her in the face, killing her instantly. At the time of the murder, he was a convicted felon from 2001. He was captured in San Ysidro, California, on May 28, 2016. He was convicted on August 29, 2018, and sentenced to 75 years to life in prison.
Luis Macedo	#508	May 19, 2016	Fifteen months
Luis Macedo was wanted in the May 1, 2009, murder of a 15-year-old boy in Chicago. Macedo, a member of the Latin Kings gang, and his fellow gang members are believed to have beaten up and shot the boy, and then burned the boy's body, all after he refused to give the gang sign. Macedo is alleged to have initiated the attack. He was captured in Guadalajara, Jalisco, Mexico, on August 27, 2017.
Shanika Minor	#509	June 28, 2016	Three days
Shanika S. Minor was wanted in the March 6, 2016 murder in Milwaukee, Wisconsin, of a pregnant 23-year-old woman who was her mother's neighbor. According to law enforcement officials, the victim was shot because she was playing her music too loud. Minor was captured in Fayetteville, North Carolina, the FBI confirmed on July 1, 2016. Minor pled guilty to the killings and was sentenced to thirty years in prison.
Marlon Jones	#510	December 1, 2016	One day
Marlon Jones, believed to be a member of a narcotics crew in Jamaica, was wanted in the October 15, 2016, murders of four people at a party in Los Angeles. Police say that Jones shot and killed the four because they were members of a rival gang. He was captured in Los Angeles one day after he was added to the list.
Robert Francis Van Wisse	#511	December 13, 2016	Six weeks
Robert Francis Van Wisse was wanted in the September 1983 murder of janitorial worker Laurie Stout in Austin, Texas. Police say that Van Wisse, who was 19 years old and a student at the University of Texas at the time, sexually assaulted and killed her. Although DNA testing was used, he was let go given the limitations of the technology at the time. A 1992 investigation into the murder – with now-advanced technology – determined that Van Wisse was the killer, but he had fled Austin. Charges were issued against him for the murder in 1996. He surrendered to authorities in Laredo, Texas, on January 26, 2017.
Terry A. D. Strickland	#512	December 15, 2016	One month
Terry A. D. Strickland was wanted in the murders of two men in Milwaukee on July 17, 2016. Police say there was a fight with seven or eight other men. Strickland allegedly drew a .40-caliber handgun and began shooting into the crowd, killing two men. His 18-month-old daughter was abandoned in a room which he rented. He was arrested in El Paso, Texas, on January 15, 2017, exactly one month after being added to the list. He was sentenced to 60 years in prison on July 26, 2017.

=== 2017 ===
Name	Sequence Number	Date of Entry	Time Listed
Walter Yovany Gomez	#513	April 12, 2017	Four months
Walter Yovany Gomez was wanted in the May 8, 2011, murder of his best friend in Plainfield, New Jersey. Law enforcement officials say that Gomez killed the victim with an aluminum baseball bat, and then cut his throat with a knife, then grabbed a screwdriver and repeatedly stabbed him in the back. Supposedly, Gomez was trying out to become a member of the MS-13 gang. All other accomplices in connection with the murder have been arrested. He was captured in Woodbridge, Virginia, on August 11, 2017. Gomez pled guilty and was sentenced to 25 years in prison.
Bhadreshkumar Chetanbhai Patel	#514	April 18, 2017	Still at large
Bhadreshkumar Chetanbhai Patel is wanted in the April 12, 2015, murder of his wife, Palak Patel, at a donut shop in Hanover, Maryland. Patel allegedly got into a fight with his wife over her wanting to return home to India and stabbed her several times before fleeing.
Santiago Villalba Mederos	#515	September 25, 2017	Three years
Santiago Villalba Mederos was wanted for several crimes in Tacoma, Washington, in 2010. Police say that he murdered a woman and seriously injured her brother, and a month later murdered another man. Mederos was a teenager at the time. He was, and may still be, a member of the Eastside Lokotes Sureños gang. He was captured in Tenancingo, Mexico, on June 5, 2020.
Alejandro Castillo	#516	October 24, 2017	Nine years
Alejandro Castillo was wanted in the August 9, 2016, murder of a coworker in Charlotte, North Carolina, who he had previously dated. Law enforcement officials in Mecklenburg County, North Carolina, say that the victim owed him $1,000, and after the murder, he and a female accomplice fled to Mexico in the victim's car. The accomplice later surrendered to authorities. He was captured in Pachuca, Mexico, on January 16, 2026.
Jesus Roberto Munguia	#517	November 13, 2017	Three months
Jesus Roberto Munguia was wanted for the July 2, 2008, murder of his wife in Las Vegas. Police say that after he locked their four children (ages 6 to 12 at the time) in his house, he put her in a car, bound her in seat belts and used jumper cables to tie her to the car seat's headrest. He then allegedly killed her with a blunt object. He and his wife had separated earlier over accusations of infidelity. He was known to be a member of the TEPA 13 gang. He was captured in Pajacuarán, Michoacán, Mexico, the FBI announced on February 15, 2018. Munguia died while in custody in June 2021 before his case could be brought to trial.

=== 2018 ===
Name	Sequence Number	Date of Entry	Time Listed
Rafael Caro Quintero	#518	April 12, 2018	Four years
Rafael Caro Quintero, considered to be one of the godfathers of Mexican drug trafficking since the 1970s, was wanted for, among other crimes, a 1985 kidnapping and murder of a DEA agent who was about to expose a drug pipeline. The FBI offered a reward of $20 million for information leading to his arrest. He was captured in Choix Municipality, Sinaloa, Mexico, on July 15, 2022.
Antwan Mims	#519	June 27, 2018	One month
Antwan Mims was wanted in the March 25, 2018, murder of two people in Benton Harbor, Michigan. Police say he shot and killed both people at a house party. According to the FBI, he is a member of the Gangster Disciples gang. He was captured in College Park, Georgia on July 31, 2018.
Greg Alyn Carlson	#520	September 27, 2018	Four months
Greg Alyn Carlson was wanted for a series of sexual assaults on women, including a 2017 burglary-turned-sexual assault in Los Angeles. He was arrested for that, but he posted bond and fled. He was seen in Hoover, Alabama, Jacksonville, Florida, and Daytona Beach, Florida. He was known to be driving a stolen 2017 Hyundai Accent rental car. He was shot and killed in Apex, North Carolina, on February 13, 2019.
Lamont Stephenson	#521	October 11, 2018	Four months
Lamont Stephenson was wanted for the October 2014 murder of his fiancee in Newark, New Jersey. They had attended the same high school and reunited on Facebook. He is also suspected in the murder of a Southeast D.C. woman on March 6, 2019. He was captured in Lanham, Maryland, on March 7, 2019.

=== 2019 ===
Name	Sequence Number	Date of Entry	Time Listed
Arnoldo Jimenez	#522	May 8, 2019	Six years
Arnoldo Jimenez was wanted for the murder of his wife on May 12, 2012. Jimenez allegedly stabbed his wife to death hours after their wedding. Her body was found in a bathtub at her apartment in Burbank, Illinois. He was captured in Monterrey, Mexico, on January 30, 2025.
Eugene Palmer	#523	May 29, 2019	Still at large but removed from the list
Eugene Palmer is wanted for allegedly killing his daughter-in-law on September 24, 2012, outside her home in Stony Point, New York. He was removed from the list on July 20, 2022, for no longer meeting the list criteria.

== End of the decade ==
As the decade closed, the following were still at large as the Ten Most Wanted Fugitives:

Name	Sequence number	Date of entry
Robert William Fisher	#475	Jun 29, 2002
Alexis Flores	#487	Jun 2, 2007
Jason Derek Brown	#489	Dec 8, 2007
Yaser Abdel Said	#504	Dec 4, 2014
Bhadreshkumar Chetanbhai Patel	#514	Apr 18, 2017
Santiago Villalba Mederos	#515	Sep 25, 2017
Alejandro Castillo	#516	Oct 24, 2017
Rafael Caro Quintero	#518	Apr 12, 2018
Arnoldo Jimenez	#522	May 8, 2019
Eugene Palmer	#523	May 29, 2019

== FBI directors in the 2010s ==
- Robert Mueller (2001–2013)
- James Comey (2013–2017)
- Andrew McCabe (2017)
- Christopher A. Wray (2017–2025)
