= The Hunt with John Walsh =

American television series

- Genre: Documentary
- Starring: John Walsh
- Opening theme: Catching Bad Guys in the Primetime
- Composer: John Walsh playing the pedal steel
- Country of origin: United States
- Original language: English
- No. of seasons: 5
- No. of episodes: 42

Production
- Running time: 40–44 minutes
- Production company: Zero Point Zero Production

Original release
- Network: CNN
- Release: July 13, 2014 – November 19, 2017

Related
- America's Most Wanted, In Pursuit with John Walsh

The Hunt with John Walsh is an American investigation/documentary series that debuted on CNN on July 13, 2014. The series is hosted by John Walsh. The second season premiered on July 12, 2015, and the third season premiered on June 19, 2016. The fourth season premiered on CNN's sister station, HLN, on July 23, 2017. A successor to the show, In Pursuit with John Walsh was announced in early 2018. It premiered in January 2019 on Investigation Discovery.

== Format ==
The series profiles an unsolved and ongoing high-profile crime story as told by witnesses (including the surviving victims) and law enforcement officials, along with re-enactments of how the events happened. A picture of the person or persons involved is shown along with a number to call (1-866-THE-HUNT, or 1-866-843-4868) if a viewer has any information or leads on the subject featured on the program. Tipsters' identities will remain anonymous, and may be eligible for a cash award if it leads to the apprehension & conviction of the fugitive(s) involved.

== Aftermath ==
One of the suspects who was profiled on The Hunt episode that aired on July 20, 2014, Charles Mozdir, was shot and killed during a shootout with police and US Marshals in New York City on July 28, 2014. Mozdir had been wanted in connection with child molestation and pornography, including being convicted for molesting a child of a family friend in Coronado, California in 2012, when he fled after failing to show up for his sentencing. This would be followed five days later on August 3, 2014, when a hiker discovered the remains of Shane Miller, a convicted felon who was the subject of a manhunt after he murdered his wife and two daughters on May 7, 2013. Miller's body was found outside a creek near Petrolia, California, where he was last seen after evading authorities. Miller was the first person to be profiled on The Hunt (July 13, 2014) and its second to have met with a deadly conclusion.

Since the show's airing, twenty-three fugitives have been captured, one was killed, and three were found dead.

== Reception ==
The series has received mixed reviews, mostly about the show's format. In a review from Variety writer Brian Lowry noted that the series was "Essentially a new iteration of Walsh's America's Most Wanted, the show feels more suited to TLC or Investigation Discovery, featuring reenacted shots like a dead body with blood artfully oozing from it. In the process, CNN further blurs the thin red line between news and Lifetime movie."

Audience reception, however, was and has been much more positive. The debut episode won the 9 PM ET time slot for cable news networks, delivering 989,000 total viewers and 330,000 in the 25–54 demographic range. It was the highest-rated debut episode in the demo for a CNN original series.

The Hunt continued to win its time slot in total viewers and the 25–54 demographic for the rest of the month of July.

== Episodes ==
=== Season 1 (2014) ===
No. overall	No. in season	Title	Featured fugitive(s)	Original release date
1	1	"Murder in the Mountains"	Shane Franklin Miller	July 13, 2014
An abusive husband goes on the lam in the mountains after he allegedly murders his wife and their two children in their home. Fugitive Status: Found dead August 3, 2014.
2	2	"The Enemy Next Door"	Kevin Stoeser & Charles Mozdir	July 20, 2014
A former soldier escapes custody after being caught with child pornography, and an accused child molester shoots it out with police. Fugitive Status: Kevin Stoeser - Found dead in September 2014. Charles Mozdir - Killed by police on July 28, 2014.
3	3	"Family Annihilator"	Bradford Bishop	July 27, 2014
After allegedly brutally slaying his entire family and torching their bodies, a former diplomat flees overseas, where he eludes authorities for decades. Fugitive Status: Still at large. Bishop was on the FBI's top 10 Most Wanted list until he was removed on June 27, 2018.
4	4	"Under the Influence"	David Burgert & Christopher Ponce	August 3, 2014
A troubled ex-Marine fires on police and vanishes into the woods without a trace, and a drunk driver removes his tracking device and vanishes. Fugitive Status: Burgert is still at large; Ponce was captured in Spain on August 7, 2016, and was extradited back to Florida to face new charges.
5	5	"Point Blank Murder"	Rick McLean & Thayne Smika	August 10, 2014
A trusted neighbor disappears after facing multiple charges of child molestation, and new evidence in an old case leads to a manhunt for the suspect. Fugitive Status: Smika is still at large. A decomposed body was found in Seneca, South Carolina on November 23, 2021, was discovered to be McLean's. McLean was on the United States Marshals Service top 15 Most Wanted Fugitives list from 2006 until his discovery of his body in 2021. Smika was also profiled in the January 23, 2019 episode of the Investigation Discovery series In Pursuit with John Walsh.
6	6	"Trafficking in Death"	Guillermo Madrigal Ballesteros	August 17, 2014
Suspected of letting 11 undocumented immigrants perish in an overheated rail car, an accused human trafficker goes on the run from authorities. Fugitive Status: Still at large.
7	7	"Preaching Lies"	Victor Barnard	August 24, 2014
The leader of a small cult flees overseas after he's accused of sexually abusing the underage daughters of many of his followers. Fugitive Status: Arrested in Brazil on February 27, 2015. On October, 28, 2016, was sentenced to 30 years in prison.
8	8	"Justice Denied"	Jacob Wetterling's abductor & Genevieve Kelley	August 31, 2014
Parents of an abducted boy keep the search for their son alive after more than two decades, and a mother abducts her own daughter and hides her for more than a decade. Fugitive Status: Danny Heinrich, Jacob Wetterling's abductor, came forward on September 6, 2016, and confessed to the crime. This comes after he led authorities to the location of Wetterling's remains on September 3, 2016. Genevieve Kelley - Surrendered to police on November 17, 2014. and her daughter along with her step-father returned on April 13, 2015.

=== Season 2 (2015) ===
No. overall	No. in season	Title	Featured fugitive(s)	Original release date
9	1	"Crimes of the Father"	Yaser Abdel Said	July 12, 2015
An Egyptian-born taxi driver takes deadly advantage - and control of - his Texas family by abusing his wife and committing incest with his two daughters, whom he would kill in 2008 after learning they had boyfriends and were trying to flee with their mother to Oklahoma. Fugitive Status: Said was captured in Justin, Texas, the FBI announced on August 26, 2020. Said was also on the FBI's top 10 Most Wanted list. Said was sentenced to life in prison without the possibility of parole on August 9, 2022.
10	2	"Deadly Lust"	Tomas Magallon Gonzalez & Daniel Hiers, Jr.	July 19, 2015
Family members in California details the manipulation and sexual molestations of a man who they trusted as a father, which leads to the 2008 murder of a step-daughter who he molested and had a child with; a Charleston, South Carolina police officer becomes a fugitive from justice after he killed his Brazilian-born wife and charged with sexually molesting a student from his karate class in 2005. Fugitive Status: Gonzalez is still at large. Gonzalez was also profiled on the February 20, 2019 episode of the Investigation Discovery series In Pursuit with John Walsh. Hiers was reportedly captured in China on September 20, 2018. Hiers was also on the United States Marshals Service 15 Most Wanted List until he was removed in June 2022.
11	3	"Torture House"	Paul Jackson	July 26, 2015
The search is on to track down an Oregon man who has eluded authorities since 1992 after he was convicted and arrested for kidnapping, rape, and torture of a teenage prostitute that he and his half-brother held prisoner for several hours until she escaped. The victim eventually led police to the home and discovered that they also kidnapped and tortured many more women. While the half-brother has since turned himself in and is serving a 108-year sentence, he has remained silent on his sibling's whereabouts. Fugitive Status: Arrested in Guadalajara, Mexico on September 28, 2015. Jackson was sentenced to 18 years in prison on May 10, 2016.
12	4	"Fugitive Mom"	Megan Everett (and her daughter Lilly Baumann); Johnny Napier	August 2, 2015
A Florida woman disappears with her daughter and leaves both the child's father and her family. A pedophile is sought by authorities in Texas and Montana. Fugitive Status: Everett was apprehended on August 3, 2015, the day after the show aired in Palatka, Florida. Baumann was found safe and reunited with her father. Everett was sentenced to 2 years of house arrest and three years of probation. The following Friday, August 7, authorities arrested Carlos C. Lesters, Everett's former boyfriend, for kidnapping, interference with custody and concealing minors contrary to a court order. Napier was captured in Springfield, Missouri on November 20, 2014, and extradited back to Texas. He was sentenced to 28 years in prison on February 29, 2016, with other charges still pending.
13	5	"Innocence Defiled"	Prakashanand Saraswati	August 9, 2015
A Hindu spiritual leader who was convicted of child molestation in Texas has managed to elude authorities. Fugitive Status: Still at large; might be in hiding in India and using aliases (the end of the episode mentioned that his sect is suspected of helping him and changing his name).
14	6	"Deceived to Death"	Margaret Lorraine Smith; Paul Winklebleck	August 16, 2015
A Texas woman is being sought in connection with the murder of her estranged husband - after she paid her boyfriend to have him killed so to make it look like an accident in order to get his real estate holdings, which is in the millions. Her deception of claiming innocence would come undone when the boyfriend, who is now serving life in prison, told authorities she planned it all along; An Oregon construction worker, who is wanted on felony warrants for kidnapping, criminal impersonation, assault, attempted rape, robbery, child sex abuse and failing to register as a child sex offender, disappears after his last attempt in 2010, when he tried to kidnap two young women after they attended a Snoop Dogg concert in Portland. Fugitive Status: Smith is still at large; After this segment was completed, the remains of Winklebleck were found by hunters near Turner, Oregon in December 2014, and the remains were confirmed via DNA.
15	7	"Fighting for Life"	Herbert Maldonado; Bruce Sawhill (with wife Keni Jo Sawhill)	August 23, 2015
The 2002 murder of a Texas woman who was trying to make money as a prostitute by a self-described "Vampire" continues to haunt authorities and her family members after his confession, even as they pursue his whereabouts after his disappearance upon learning that the murderer's family posted bail before he could be charged with the crime. A Missouri man who had been convicted for sodomy and had been on parole continued his pedophilia ways after moving back to his hometown and began molesting his best friend's daughter and was later charged for the crime in 2001. Unfortunately, he and his wife disappeared just as he was about to go on trial in November 2002. The disappearance would take its toll on the victim, who committed suicide by inhaling paint fumes after she moved to Colorado in 2003. Fugitive Status: Both still at large.
16	8	"The Disappearing"	Timmothy Pitzen; Alexander Roosevelt Hill, Jr	August 30, 2015
After a woman's suicide in Rockford, Illinois in 2011, the family wants know who has her son, whom she took off with and disappeared, leaving a note that states that he has found a family to take care of him. Jealousy and vengeance leads a Virginia man with a lengthy criminal record to commit arson and murder, killing his ex-girlfriend's sister and her son, her mother, and her grandmother. Fugitive Status: Pitzen is still missing. Hill was arrested in Buffalo, New York after he was interviewed on local television; a viewer in Richmond, Virginia saw the story and identified him. On September 15, 2017, a jury in Petersburg, Virginia found him guilty of two counts of capital murder, arson, and other charges. He was sentenced to three life sentences. He died in prison of a pulmonary embolism on September 1, 2018, at age 52.

=== Season 3 (2016) ===
No. overall	No. in season	Title	Featured fugitive(s)	Original release date
17	1	"Still Running 2016"	Jorge Ruerda Landeros	June 19, 2016
A stock broker is the prime suspect in the murder of a Maryland accounting professor after he uses her in a scheme to take advantage of her life savings and their relationship. However, despite DNA evidence linking him to the crime, he has managed to avoid justice by hiding in his native Mexico in order to avoid extradition and claiming innocence. Status: Landeros was captured in Mexico on December 13, 2022 and returned to the U.S. in July 2023.
18	2	"Confessions of a Killer"	Elby Hars; Eugene Palmer	June 19, 2016
A convicted South Carolina sexual predator, who already served five of his ten years for incesting his daughter, becomes too obsessed and too close with his young female victims, even with the help of the daughter, the latter arrested and served ten years for her involvement. A New York State man takes to the woods after he is alleged to have shot and killed his estranged daughter-in-law over a property dispute. Status: Both still at large. Palmer was on the FBI's top 10 Most Wanted list until he was removed on July 20, 2022.
19	3	"Wolf in Sheep's Clothing"	Oscar Menjivar Herrera; Juan Reyes and Eric Reyes-Santiago	June 26, 2016
A Nebraska man uses a twelve year old boy to lure girls so he can then sexually assault them. The suspect was arrested, but escaped during transit to jail, resuming his attack on another teenage girl. Authorities in Michigan track down a pair of brothers who gunned down a young man at a party during a search for an ex-gang member. Status: Menjivar-Herrera is still at large; both brothers were caught in Mexico in November 2015 and were convicted in March 2016.
20	4	"The Sins of Fathers"	TBA	July 3, 2016
21	5	"Fire and Murder"	Robert William Fisher; John and Julieanne Dimitrion	July 10, 2016
Robert William Fisher has not been seen since April 10, 2001, after allegedly setting his Scottsdale, Arizona house on fire and fatally murdering his wife, daughter, and son. He is thought to be an avid outdoors man and is possibly hiding in the Tonto National Forest where his Toyota 4Runner was discovered 10 days after the murders. A Honolulu couple flee the island with help from a group opposed to the United States government after they are indicted for mortgage fraud, leaving victims in a state of financial ruin and family grief. Status: All three are still at large. Fisher was on the FBI's top 10 Most Wanted list until he was removed on November 3, 2021. The Dimitrions were also featured on CNBC's American Greed: The Fugitives.
22	6	"Sex Slaves In Texas"	Alfonso Angel "Poncho" Diaz-Juarez	August 14, 2016
Authorities in Harris County, Texas, are desperate to find a convicted pimp, child molester and sexual predator, known for profiting from prostitution and sex trade trafficking. Among his victims was a woman whom he impregnated and had a daughter that he used as insurance in order to keep her from escaping. His downfall came when one of the places used for prostitution was raided in 2010, only to elude the authorities after he was sentenced to life for his crimes in 2013. Status: Diaz-Juarez was captured on March 7th, 2025 in Mexico and was extradited to Houston.
23	7	"The Cold-Blooded Charmer"	TBA	August 21, 2016
24	8	"Murder Girl"	Jennifer Puente	August 28, 2016
A Texas woman is being sought in connection with the horrific and brutal murder of her best friend in 2012, and already her accomplice/boyfriend is serving 34 years for his part in the crime. Status: Puente was captured by Mexican authorities in October 2022, and returned to Ellis County, Texas in February 2023.
25	9	"The Wanna-Be Gangster"	Anthony Burroughs; William Jordan	September 4, 2016
Burroughs is wanted in a 2000 murder in Arizona. Jordan was convicted in a 1974 murder of a school principal in Georgia, but escaped from prison in 1984. Status: Both still at large.

=== Season 4 (2017) ===
No. overall	No. in season	Title	Featured fugitive(s)	Original release date
26	1	"Still Running 2017"	Fugitives from Season 3	July 23, 2017
A recap of fugitives who have yet to be captured.
27	2	"The Frozen Prison"	Dino Curcio	July 30, 2017
A hockey coach rapes and marries a 17-year-old girl from Sweden; she remained virtually a prisoner in her house during the marriage. Status: Curcio was captured on August 3, 2017, in Deer Park, Illinois after a viewer called in a tip that led U.S. Marshals to his capture.
28	3	"Family Predator"	Herman Carroll; Andre Neverson	August 6, 2017
An Illinois man accused of molesting family members disappears before his trial. A New York City man is wanted on charges he murdered two women. Status: Carroll was captured in Branson, Missouri on May 14, 2024. Neverson was captured in Bridgeport, Connecticut on September 4, 2018; he had been on the U.S. Marshals 15 Most Wanted Fugitives list.
29	4	"Good Wife"	Bhadreshkumar Chetanbhai Patel; Berny Figueroa	August 13, 2017
Only months after their arranged marriage, a young husband from India allegedly beats his wife to death while the two work an overnight shift in the kitchen of a Maryland donut shop. When a toddler inexplicably dies after spending a day in daycare, doctors determine that the cause of death is blunt force trauma – and the babysitter mysteriously vanishes. Status: Both still at large. Patel is also on the FBI's top 10 Most Wanted list.
30	5	"Sacrament of Blood"	Pablo Pinto Mata	August 20, 2017
A Santeria priest allegedly murders his lover, rapes a minor during a "healing" ritual, and molests his step-daughter – all hiding behind the cloak of his religion. Status: Still at large.
31	6	"Stolen Innocence"	David Bonness; Henry Godinez	August 27, 2017
A family man rapes his 12-year-old stepdaughter for five years before she comes forward with the truth – then he goes on the run. Two coworkers and roommates become close friends, but soon greed and desperation drives one of them to allegedly murder the other. Status: Both men still at large. Bonness is on the US Marshals' 15 Most Wanted Fugitives list. He was profiled on In Pursuit with John Walsh on September 7, 2022.
32	7	"A Final Romance"	Lamont Stephenson; Elton Jardines	September 10, 2017
An unlikely love affair develops between former high school classmates who reconnected on Facebook – but the whirlwind romance ends with one lover dead and the other on the run. What begins as a rare night out for a group of single moms ends tragically when a random encounter at a gas station devolves into a one-sided shootout that takes two of the women's lives. Status: Stephenson was arrested on March 7, 2019. He was added to the FBI 10 Most Wanted list on October 11, 2018. He was profiled on the February 13, 2019 episode of In Pursuit with John Walsh. Stephenson is suspected of murdering Natina Kiah in Washington, D.C. on March 5, 2019. Jardines was captured by U.S. Marshals in Tlaquepaque, Jalisco, Mexico on August 29, 2018.
33	8	"The Stolen Child"	Maria Cabrera; Robert Van Wisse	September 17, 2017
A father in the midst of a child custody battle over his son discovers a note announcing that the child's mother has vanished, taking their child with her. A young mother working as a custodian in an office complex is found raped and strangled in the men's bathroom, but it takes more than 20 years of cold-case work to pinpoint the killer. Status: Cabrera was arrested in Raymond, Washington on September 18, 2017. The child, Daniel, was found safe. Cabrera was also on the FBI's Parental Kidnappings list. Van Wisse surrendered to U.S. officials on January 28, 2017, after a little over a month of being the 511th fugitive added to the FBI Ten Most Wanted Fugitives list in December 2016.
34	9	"School of Lies"	Ty (Joseph Green) and Tisa (Chanell Warren) Yiyara; Orlando Orea	September 24, 2017
A convicted sex offender and his girlfriend pose as upright citizens founding a progressive urban school – until they are caught having sex with one of the students. In New York City, a construction worker brutally slashes a popular young British man to death in a seemingly random encounter. Status: Green and Warren were captured in Plantation, Florida on October 18, 2017. Orea was captured in Puebla, Mexico on September 25, 2018, during a shootout that left two Interpol agents dead.
35	10	"Brutal Obsession"	Rudy Fernandez; Michael Akerly	October 1, 2017
A rejected abusive boyfriend stalks his ex – the mother of his child – trapping and killing her in her workplace. A 61-year-old grandmother is raped by a 37-year-old ne'er-do-well after he lures her to his dungeon-like home. Status: Both men are still at large. Fernandez was also profiled on the March 13, 2019 episode of In Pursuit with John Walsh.
36	11	"Death Do Us Part"	Peter Chadwick; Luis Rodriguez-Mena	October 8, 2017
A Southern California millionaire allegedly murders his wife, and then calls the authorities with a far-fetched claim that the house-painter did it. The brutal rape and murder of a flight attendant goes unsolved for eight years, until the perpetrator's terrified family flees to Mexico to unmask him for authorities. Status: Rodriguez-Mena was captured June 22nd, 2020 in Morelos, Mexico, and sentenced to 20 years. Chadwick was captured in Mexico on August 4, 2019. Chadwick had been on the U.S. Marshals Service 15 Most Wanted Fugitives list since September 19, 2018.
37	12	"Enemy Territory"	Luis Macedo; O. Kevin Moradian	October 15, 2017
A Chicago teenager refuses to show allegiance to a violent gang after he stumbles upon their turf winds up beaten, shot and burned to death. A man is accused of killing an Iraq War veteran while under the influence. Status: Macedo was captured on August 27, 2017, a year after he became the 507th fugitive added to the FBI Most Wanted Fugitives List. Moradian is still at large.
38	13	"Bad Cop"	Arthur Crabtree	October 22, 2017
A former police officer who had stalked, assaulted, or attempted to seduce more than five young women over the course of his career is arrested while attempting to hook up for sex with minor girls he met on Internet chatrooms; he serves his time – then, while out on parole, he flees. Status: Crabtree was apprehended in Mexico on April 21, 2016.
39	14	"No Way Out"	Charles Dawson; Kenneth Cofer	October 29, 2017
In a nightmarish story, a young girl being raped by her stepfather tells her family and the authorities – and no one believes her. A grudge-fight between acquaintances escalates until one man shoots the other in the head in front of their three mutual friends. Status: Both men still at large.
40	15	"The Enemy Within"	Matthew Dion	November 5, 2017
An eccentric young father in Manchester, New Hampshire murders his own parents in a haze of rage and drug addiction - then abandons his own child and flees into the American South. Status: Dion was captured in 2015. He pled guilty to charges of murder and arson in Manchester as part of a plea bargain on December 2, 2015. He was sentenced to 60 years in prison.
41	16	"Factory of Death"	Woravit "Kim" Mektrakarn	November 12, 2017
An undocumented factory worker in southern California vanishes after he blackmails his employers about their illegal employment practices. Status: Mektrakarn was found in Bangkok, Thailand, and was extradited to San Bernardino, CA on January 26th, 2026.
42	17	"Death In Broad Daylight"	Mario Albert Lozano; Donna Borup	November 19, 2017
When two teenagers from different gangs get into an ongoing battle over family and respect, one stabs the other to death in front of dozens of witnesses. During an early 1980s protest, a member of a radical group blinds a police officer and goes on the run for 35 years. Status: Lozano was captured in Mexicali, Mexico in February 2018. He was taken into custody in Watsonville, California on August 2, 2018. Borup is on the FBI's 10 Most Wanted Terrorists List.
