= Santiago Villalba Mederos =

American former fugitive

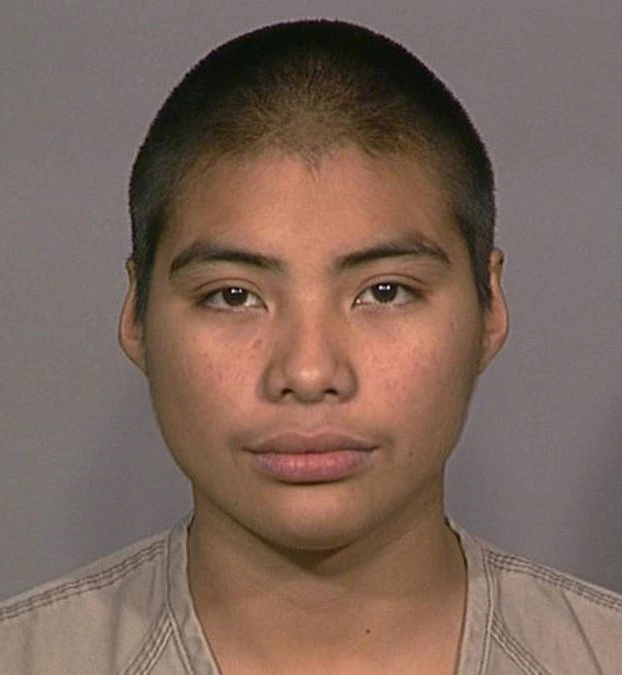
- Photograph taken in 2009

FBI Ten Most Wanted Fugitive
- Charges: Murder (2 counts); Unlawful Flight to Avoid Prosecution
- Reward: $100,000
- Alias: "Pucho" "Stretch"; Santiago Mederes; Santiago Mederos; Santiago V. Mederos; Santiago Medeors; Santiago Villalva Mederos

Description
- Born: June 5, 1991 (age 35); Tacoma, Washington, U.S.
- Nationality: American
- Gender: Male
- Height: 5 ft 10 in (178 cm)
- Weight: 140 lb (64 kg)

Status
- Added: September 25, 2017
- Caught: June 5, 2020
- Number: 515
- Captured

Santiago "Pucho" Villalba Mederos (born June 5, 1991) is an American former fugitive who was added to the FBI Ten Most Wanted Fugitives list on September 25, 2017. He was wanted for two murders in Tacoma, Washington, in 2010. Mederos was the 515th fugitive to be placed on the FBI's Ten Most Wanted Fugitives list. The FBI offered a reward of up to $100,000 for information leading to his capture. He was captured in Tenancingo, Mexico, on June 5, 2020.

== Background ==
Mederos was born on June 5, 1991, and is an alleged murderer and gang member from the state of Washington. He was 18 years old when he allegedly killed and wounded multiple people on different occasions in Washington in 2010. He is a member of the Eastside Lokotes Sureños (ELS) gang, a violent gang based in Washington. Mederos is described as Hispanic, 5 feet 10 and 140 pounds, with black hair and brown eyes. He has a tattoo of the letter “S” on his left shoulder and a tattoo of the letter “E” on his right shoulder. He speaks fluent English and Spanish.

== Murders ==
On February 7, 2010, Mederos and six other gang members from the ELS were out driving a stolen van through Tacoma, Washington, in a search for rival gang members. They were after the gang in retaliation for a shooting that had occurred two days earlier in which an ELS member was badly wounded. They came across 20-year-old Camille Love and her brother 19-year-old Josh Love. Camille was driving while Josh was sat in the passenger seat of the vehicle. They had just left a family dinner and were driving to a friend's house. The siblings were stopped at a traffic light and were inside a red car. Josh was wearing a red coat, and red was the color associated with the rival gang. Mistaking Josh for a rival gang member, Mederos and at least one other gang member opened fire into the vehicle. They fatally shot Camille and seriously wounded Josh. Josh was shot twice and was hit in the arm and on his side. Neither Josh or Camille were associated with any gang.

On March 25, 2010, Mederos and another gang member ransacked a car in an apparent robbery in a South Tacoma alley. They suspected the owner of the car owed the gang money. The duo then got into a fight with three other men who confronted them. Mederos shot at the group of people as he fled on foot and fatally shot 25-year-old Saul Lucas-Alfonso. Lucas-Alfonso again was not associated with any gang.

== Aftermath ==
The leader of the Eastside Lokotes Sureños, Juan Zuniga-Gonzalez, was blamed for the murders. The death of Love led to a crackdown from the Tacoma Police Department against the ELS. Unhappy with Zuniga's leadership and the unwanted attention from Love's murder, four members of the gang who were in prison at the time ordered the murder of Zuniga-Gonzalez. On May 12, 2010, Zuniga-Gonzalez was murdered at his home in Tacoma. 15-year-old Naitaalii Toleafoa and 17-year-old Juan Ortiz drove to Zuniga's home. Ortiz fatally shot Zuniga in the back of the head in his garage. Both suspects then fled to Mexico after the assassination. Toleafoa was captured in 2012 and Ortiz was arrested in Mexico City in August 2016. Both were extradited from Mexico to stand trial for the murder. In 2014, Toleafea pleaded guilty to first degree murder and was sentenced to 27 years in prison. Four years later, Ortiz was convicted of first degree murder and second degree assault and was sentenced to 31 years in prison.

== Investigation ==
Seven ELS gang members were charged in Love's murder. All seven members have now been captured and are serving prison sentences ranging from 12 to 75 years. According to the FBI, it was believed that Mederos fled to Mexico after the murders. He had family in the Las Grutas, Guerrero and Cuernavaca areas of Mexico. Mederos was charged with first-degree murder, attempted first-degree murder, first-degree conspiracy to commit murder and unlawful possession of a firearm.

Jesus Mederos, the older brother of Santiago Mederos, was arrested in May 2017 in Cuernavaca, Mexico. Jesus was responsible for the fatal shooting of 18-year-old Robert Tapia at a Tacoma intersection in October 2006. After the murder he fled to Mexico and spent 12 years on the run before being captured. The FBI hoped the arrest of Santiago's brother would help in finding him. A reward of $100,000 was offered by the FBI for information that led to the arrest and extradition of Mederos. In 2019, two years after he was arrested, Jesus Mederos was convicted of second degree murder and was sentenced to 19 years and three months in prison.

== Capture ==
Mederos was arrested on his 29th birthday on June 5, 2020. According to the FBI, he was captured in Tenancingo, Mexico, near Mexico City. He was flown to Los Angeles to face a federal charge of unlawful flight to avoid prosecution.

Two of Mederos's accomplices who were also fugitives were captured not long after his arrest. Fugitive Andres Maurice Mendez was captured on September 3, 2020. Mendez was wanted in connection with the murder of Lucas-Alfonso. Fugitive Richard Charles Sanchez was captured on February 10, 2021. Sanchez was wanted in connection with the murders of both Love and Lucas-Alfonso. Both suspects were captured in Mexico.

== Trial and sentencing ==
On October 11, 2021, Mederos pleaded guilty to first degree murder for killing Camille Love. The following year, he was sentenced to 30 years and one month in prison. As of October 2026, Mederos was incarcerated at Monroe Correctional Complex.
