= Arnoldo Jimenez =

American former fugitive

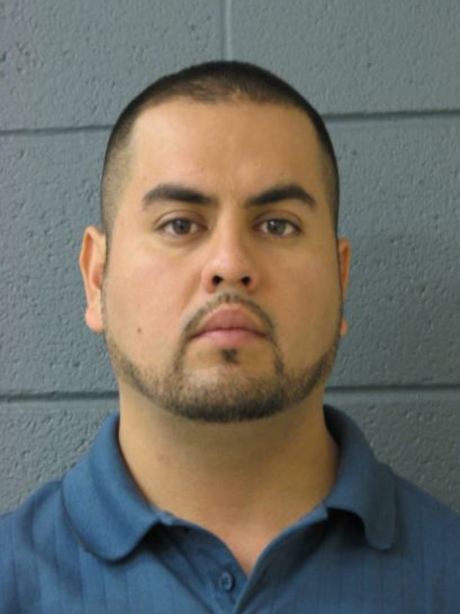
- Photograph taken in 2011

FBI Ten Most Wanted Fugitive
- Charges: First-degree murder; Unlawful Flight to Avoid Prosecution
- Reward: $250,000
- Alias: Arnoldo Gimenez; Arnoldo Rochel Jimenez

Description
- Born: February 19, 1982 (age 44); Texas, United States
- Race: Hispanic
- Gender: Male
- Height: 6 ft 0 in (183 cm)
- Weight: 200–225 lb (91–102 kg)
- Spouse: Estrella Carrera (died 2012)

Status
- Added: May 8, 2019
- Caught: January 30, 2025
- Number: 522
- Captured

Arnoldo Jimenez (born February 19, 1982) is an American former fugitive who was added to the FBI Ten Most Wanted Fugitives list on May 8, 2019. He was wanted for the May 2012 murder of his wife, Estrella Carrera, on the day after their wedding; she was found dead in a bathtub at her apartment in Burbank, Illinois. Jimenez was the 522nd fugitive to be placed on the FBI's Ten Most Wanted Fugitives list. The FBI offered a reward of up to $250,000 for information leading to his capture. On January 30, 2025, Jimenez was captured in Monterrey, Mexico.

== Background ==
Arnoldo Jimenez and Estrella Carrera were married on May 11, 2012, at Chicago City Hall. Carrera had two children, one 9-year-old daughter from a previous relationship and a 2-year-old son with Jimenez. The couple had dinner with family and friends that night and then headed to a nightclub, which they left around 4 am on May 12.

== Murder ==
It is believed by the FBI that on the way home, the couple got into a heated argument in Jimenez's black 2006 four-door Maserati. Jimenez then fatally stabbed Carrera multiple times in his car and dragged her body into her apartment. Carrera's body was dumped in the bathtub at her apartment, and she was still wearing the same silver dress she wore to her wedding.

Carrera was meant to pick up her children from family members on May 12, but she never showed up. Her family members then reported her missing to police. Her body was found inside her apartment on the afternoon of May 13. Police confirmed there was no sign of a forced entry. Jimenez had also disappeared, and his car was nowhere to be found.

Three days later, on May 15, Jimenez was charged with first-degree murder, and a state warrant was issued for his arrest. A federal warrant followed after he was charged with unlawful flight to avoid prosecution on May 17.

== Investigation ==
Investigators began tracking Jimenez and found that on May 12 he had used his cellphone in Chicago, then Southern Illinois. It was later used in Memphis, Tennessee, and then in Arkansas. On May 13 he had made calls from Houston and then in Hidalgo, Mexico. After this, the FBI states that Jimenez became a "ghost" and went completely off-the-grid.

In September 2012, police made a drug arrest on Arnoldo Jimenez's brother, Humberto. While searching his property, police discovered Arnoldo's black Maserati in the garage. Blood was found inside the car, leading police to the conclusion that Arnoldo had killed Carrera in his car and dragged her body into the bathtub inside her apartment. Police believe Humberto drove Arnoldo to Mexico in his car and left him there before returning alone back to the United States.

The FBI believed Arnoldo was hiding in Durango, specifically in the area of Santiago Papasquiaro. They also believed he may have been hiding in Reynosa, Tamaulipas.

== Capture ==
On January 30, 2025, Arnoldo Jimenez was captured in Monterrey, Mexico. He was extradited back to the United States in June 2026.
