= Greg Alyn Carlson =

American fugitive

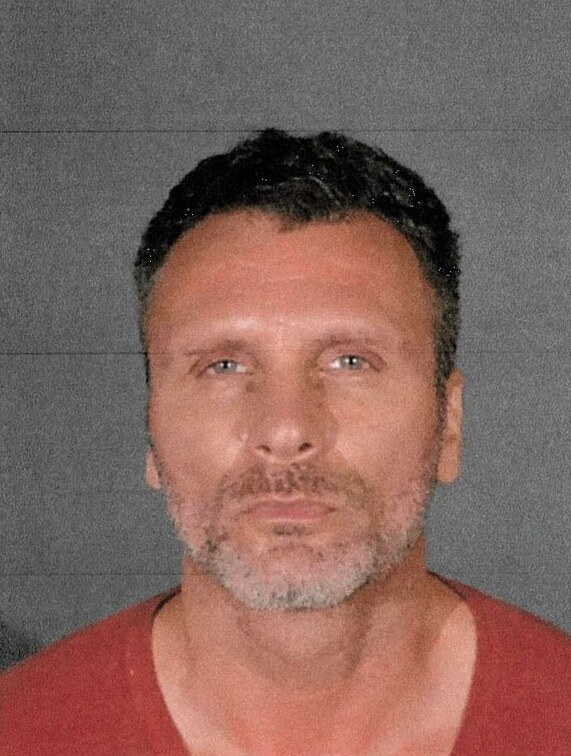
- Mugshot of Carlson

FBI Ten Most Wanted Fugitive
- Charges: Unlawful Flight to Avoid Prosecution; One count of assault with intent to commit rape
- Reward: $100,000
- Alias: Greg Carlson; Greg A. Carlson; Greg Alym Carlson

Description
- Born: November 2, 1971; Washington, D.C., U.S.
- Died: February 13, 2019 (aged 47); Apex, North Carolina, U.S.
- Nationality: American
- Gender: Male
- Height: 5 ft 11 in (180 cm)
- Weight: 170 lb (77 kg)

Status
- Added: September 27, 2018
- Number: 520
- Killed during capture attempt

Greg Alyn Carlson (November 2, 1971 – February 13, 2019) was an American criminal on the FBI Ten Most Wanted Fugitives list from September 27, 2018, to February 13, 2019.

== Background ==
Carlson was an alleged sexual predator involved in multiple armed sexual assaults in Los Angeles, California, and was wanted by the Los Angeles Police Department for assault with intent to commit rape as well as wanted by the FBI on charges of unlawful flight to avoid prosecution.

Carlson was the 520th fugitive to be placed on the FBI's Ten Most Wanted Fugitives list.

== Death ==
Carlson was shot dead by FBI agents in Apex, North Carolina, after being located on February 13, 2019. Authorities found him hiding at a hotel and attempted to take him into custody. Upon entering his room a violent altercation occurred, resulting in Carlson's death.
