= Alejandro Castillo =

Alejandro Castillo is the name of:

- Alejandro Castillo (actor), Chilean actor
- Alejandro Castillo (criminal), American former fugitive
- Alejandro Castillo (footballer), Mexican footballer
