= Jesus Roberto Munguia =

American fugitive (1976–2021)

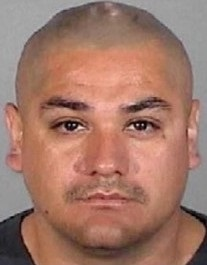

FBI Ten Most Wanted Fugitive
- Charges: First degree murder; Unlawful Flight to Avoid Prosecution
- Reward: $100,000

Description
- Born: August 13, 1976; United States
- Died: June 2021
- Spouse: Cinthia Munguia
- Children: 4

Status
- Status: Deceased
- Added: November 13, 2017
- Caught: February 15, 2018
- Number: 517
- Captured

Jesus Roberto Munguia (August 13, 1976 – June 2021) was an American fugitive who was added to the FBI Ten Most Wanted Fugitives list on November 13, 2017. In connection with the 2008 killing of his estranged wife, Cinthia Munguia, in Las Vegas, Nevada. According to authorities, the victim was restrained using seat belts and jumper cables before being fatally assaulted with a blunt object. At the time, Munguia was believed to have associations with the TEPA 13 gang.

Following the incident, he fled to Mexico, where he remained for nearly a decade. Munguia was apprehended on February 15, 2018. He died in custody in June 2021, prior to standing trial.

== Early life ==
Jesus Roberto Munguia was born in the Los Angeles, United States, He became involved with gang activity at a young age, affiliating with the TEPA 13 gang, which has ties to criminal operations in California and Nevada.

== Murder of Cinthia Munguia ==
On July 2, 2008, Munguia was involved in the premeditated killing of his estranged wife, Cinthia Munguia, in Las Vegas, Nevada. The incident occurred following the couple’s separation, which was reportedly due to allegations of infidelity.

According to investigators, prior to the incident, Munguia confined their four children, who were between the ages of 6 and 12, inside their residence. He then abducted Cinthia and restrained her in a vehicle using seat belts and jumper cables. She was fatally assaulted with a blunt object, and her body was later recovered. The case led to a nationwide search for Munguia.

== FBI Ten Most Wanted Fugitive ==
Munguia evaded authorities for nearly a decade, fleeing to Mexico shortly after the murder. On November 13, 2017, he was added to the FBI’s Ten Most Wanted Fugitives list. Law enforcement described him as armed and dangerous, and the FBI offered a reward of up to $100,000 for information leading to his capture.

== Capture and death ==
On February 15, 2018, Munguia was captured in Mexico following an international manhunt coordinated by U.S. and Mexican authorities.

In June 2021, Munguia died due to COVID-19 while in custody. Details surrounding his death were not widely released. His death occurred before he could be tried in court, concluding the legal proceedings related to the case.
