= Murder of Kendra Hatcher =

2015 murder-for-hire in Texas, United States

Dr. Kendra Hatcher was the victim of a murder-for-hire scheme perpetrated by Brenda Delgado on September 2, 2015. The motive was determined to be jealousy, as Hatcher had been dating Delgado's former boyfriend, Dr. Ricardo "Ricky" Paniagua. After an intense spying operation by Delgado, she hired two people to shoot and kill Hatcher, posing as a robbery gone bad.

== Dr. Kendra Hatcher ==
Kendra Hatcher grew up in Pleasant Plains, Illinois, alongside her brother and sister, where they were raised with strong Christian values. She went on mission trips abroad to help build churches, and she led Bible studies for low-income children. She attended DePauw University, in Indiana, where she majored in Spanish and minored in biochemistry. After graduation she enrolled at the University of Kentucky College of Dentistry. In 2015, she accepted a position at Smile Zone, a dental practice that provided high-end dentistry to children from disadvantaged backgrounds. She eventually met Dr. Ricardo "Ricky" Paniagua through Tinder. After only a short time, the relationship was considered very serious with talks of marriage. They were planning a trip to Cancún before she was murdered on September 2, 2015.

== Dr. Ricardo "Ricky" Paniagua ==
Dr. Ricardo "Ricky" Paniagua was born in northern California and later attended Stanford Medical School before moving to Dallas in 2011 to complete his residency in dermatology at the University of Texas Southwestern Medical Center. He had moved from California to Texas after going through a divorce. He then met Delgado and started a relationship with her that lasted for nearly three years. He then broke up with Delgado and pursued a platonic friendship with her afterwards. In 2015, he worked as an assistant professor at the University of Texas. That same year he would meet Hatcher and started a relationship with her where it progressed quickly.

== Brenda Delgado ==
Brenda Delgado
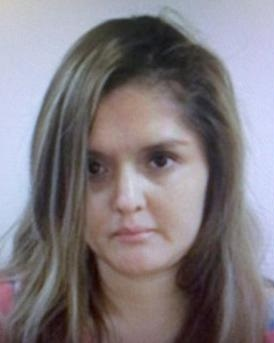

FBI Ten Most Wanted Fugitive
- Reward: $100,000

Description
- Born: Brenda Berenice Delgado Reynaga; June 18, 1982 (age 44); Mexico
- Race: Hispanic
- Gender: Female
- Height: 5 ft 5 in (165 cm)
- Weight: 145 lb (66 kg)
- Occupation: Dental Assistant

Status
- Convictions: Capital murder
- Penalty: Life in prison without the possibility of parole
- Added: April 6, 2016
- Caught: April 8, 2016
- Number: 506
- Captured

Brenda Berenice Delgado Reynaga was born in Central Mexico on June 18, 1982. Her father, Luis, wanting a better life for his family, brought his wife, Maria, and their five children to Dallas, Texas, in 1982. Brenda was the second of five children and the only girl. After graduating from Skyline High School, she got a job as a dental assistant, and took on a second job whitening teeth at a day spa while also attending church as a devout Christian. She was described as someone who always wanted to make something of her life, working multiple jobs to attain her goals. She eventually moved out of her parents' house and met Dr. Ricardo "Ricky" Paniagua on a dating app while he was in his residency in Texas. After dating for nearly three years, Brenda learned she was pregnant, and after talking with Paniagua, she decided to have an abortion. In 2015 she pursued a degree to become a Dental Hygienist at Sanford-Brown university. However, she dropped out a few months later to pursue stalking Paniagua. On April 6, 2016, she was named by the FBI as the 506th fugitive, and ninth woman overall, to be placed on its Ten Most Wanted list due to her fleeing to Mexico in response to her accomplices being arrested in the plot to murder Kendra Hatcher. On April 8, 2016, Delgado was captured in Torreón, Coahuila, Mexico. She was later extradited from Mexico to the United States to face charges of capital murder and sentenced to life in prison.

== Murder-for-hire plot of Kendra Hatcher ==
Brenda Delgado and Dr. Ricardo "Ricky" Paniagua had been in a relationship for over two years. However, their relationship ended in February 2015 when Paniagua decided to break things off. Despite the breakup, they remained in contact, with Delgado believing there was still a chance for reconciliation. By June 2015, he was in a new relationship with Kendra Hatcher and had informed Delgado via email that his new relationship was going very well. On September 2, 2015, the day before Hatcher was set to fly to Cancún with Paniagua for a long weekend, she was shot and killed in the parking garage of her apartment complex in an apparent robbery gone wrong.

Unbeknownst to Paniagua, Delgado had been monitoring his activities since their breakup. She had access to his email and iCloud passwords, a key to his apartment, and even used an app to track his cellphone location. Delgado meticulously documented Paniagua's new relationships, taking screenshots of text messages and airline reservations. The police investigation quickly revealed that the supposed robbery was actually an execution. Within a week, Dallas Police detectives uncovered evidence suggesting that Delgado had orchestrated a murder-for-hire scheme. Unable to accept Paniagua's new relationship with Hatcher, Delgado recruited two individuals, a single mother named Crystal Cortes and a small-time marijuana dealer named Kristopher Love, to carry out the killing. Evidence later showed that Delgado had convinced Love to join the murder-for-hire scheme by promising him money and drugs totaling around $3,000 using her supposed cartel connections. An accomplice, Crystal Cortes, was offered $500 to drive the getaway car. Both were subsequently arrested. Delgado, in fear of her own arrest, fled to Mexico. Because she fled out of state, the FBI offered $100,000 for information leading to her arrest or conviction.

On April 8, 2016, Delgado was arrested in Torreón, Coahuila, Mexico by agents of the Mexican Attorney General's Office and Criminal Investigations Agency with support from the FBI Attaché in Mexico City. On October 6, 2016, she was extradited to the United States to stand trial.

Cortes pleaded guilty in October 2018 and was sentenced to 35 years in prison in exchange for her cooperation as the star witness against Delgado and the shooter, Kristopher Love. On October 31, 2018, Love was convicted of capital murder and sentenced to death for his role. He is now on death row in Texas' Allan B. Polunsky Unit, according to the Texas Department of Criminal Justice.

Due to Mexico's stance on the death penalty, as part of the agreement for extradition, prosecutors could not pursue the death penalty and instead pursued life in prison. On June 7, 2019, it took the jury only 20 minutes to return a guilty verdict for Delgado. She is serving her sentence at the William P. Hobby Unit, "Hobby," a women's prison near Marlin, Texas.

== See also ==
- FBI Ten Most Wanted Fugitives, 2010s
- List of death row inmates in the United States § Texas
