= 2012 Bain murder-kidnappings =

In Whiteville, Tennessee, United States

Adam Christopher Mayes

FBI Ten Most Wanted Fugitive

Description
- Born: Adam Christopher Mayes; September 2, 1976
- Died: May 10, 2012 (aged 35); New Albany, Mississippi, U.S.
- Cause of death: Suicide (by gunshot)
- Nationality: American
- Race: White
- Gender: Male
- Height: 6 ft 3 in (191 cm)
- Weight: 175 lb (79 kg)
- Parents: Johnny Mayes Sr. Mary Frances Mayes (charged as accomplice)
- Spouse: Teresa Mayes (charged as accomplice)

Status
- Added: May 9, 2012
- Number: 496
- Deceased prior to capture

On April 27, 2012, Jo Ann Bain and her eldest daughter were murdered in Whiteville, Tennessee and the woman's two younger daughters were kidnapped by Adam Christopher Mayes, an Alpine, Mississippi man who had known the family for many years. On May 9, 2012, Mayes was added to the FBI Ten Most Wanted Fugitives. The following day, he and the two girls were spotted in a heavily wooded area; during the capture attempt, Mayes reportedly shot himself in the head and later died from his wounds. The two girls were rescued unharmed.

On August 9, 2013, in a plea bargain agreement, Mayes' wife, Teresa, pleaded guilty to two counts of second-degree murder and two counts of especially aggravated kidnapping and was sentenced to 35 years, minus the 460 days she had already spent in prison. His mother, Mary Mayes, pleaded guilty to two counts of especially aggravated kidnapping and was sentenced to 13 1/2 years.

== Murders and kidnapping ==
Jo Ann Bain was the mother of three daughters, Adrienne (b. 1997), Alexandria (b. 1999) and Kyliyah (b. 2004). Her first husband, Mark Johnson, the biological father of Adrienne and Alexandria, signed over his legal rights to the girls to Jo Ann's second husband, Gary Bain, in 2011. Gary Bain had previously been married for 20 years to Adam Mayes' eldest sister, Pamela; they divorced in 2002. Mayes had stayed friendly with Bain and was a frequent visitor to the home.

On April 27, 2012, a day before Adam Christopher Mayes was supposed to help the Bain family move to Arizona, Mayes allegedly killed Jo Ann Bain and her oldest daughter Adrienne and kidnapped the two younger girls, Alexandria and Kyliyah. Gary Bain came home late that night and assumed his family members were sleeping. Only when he could not reach his wife by cell phone and his daughters did not return from school the next day did he report them missing.

Mayes was interviewed by police officers about the Bains' disappearance on April 29. He told police he was the last to see the mother and daughters, but police found no evidence of a crime. On April 30, Jo Ann Bain's SUV was found abandoned on a country road in Tennessee.

Mayes was last seen in Guntown, Mississippi, on May 1; on May 2 he was declared a person of interest in the case, though police still did not suspect a crime.

On or around May 4, Teresa Mayes reportedly told police that her husband had killed Jo Ann and Adrienne in the Bains' garage and that the bodies were buried behind his mobile home. On May 5, investigators uncovered two "badly decomposed" bodies from a shallow grave behind the mobile home; they were identified as the bodies of Jo Ann and Adrienne on May 7.

On May 8, both Mayes' wife Teresa and mother, Mary Frances Mayes, were charged as accomplices and taken into custody.

Mayes was added to the FBI's Most Wanted List on May 9. He was charged with unlawful flight to avoid prosecution, especially aggravated kidnapping and first-degree murder.

== Recovery of Bain girls ==
Mayes and the two girls were missing for over a week when on May 10, acting on a tip, Mississippi highway patrolmen and state fish and wildlife officers searched a heavily wooded area behind the Zion Hill Baptist Church, one and a half miles from Mayes' home in Alpine.

Officers saw one of the children peeking over a ridge, then spotted the second child, then saw Mayes. The officers told him to put his hands up; he raised only one hand and officers saw a gun in the other. Mayes then shot himself in the head with a 9mm pistol. The Union County sheriff said emergency medical technicians transported Mayes via ambulance to Baptist Memorial Hospital, New Albany, Mississippi, in critical condition. The county coroner pronounced Mayes dead at 8:20 p.m.

When police found the trio on May 10, the girls said that they had been in the forest for three days without food or water. They were dehydrated and had rashes from poison ivy and insect bites. After Mayes' death, the girls were sent to a Memphis hospital, treated, and released.

Mayes' body, after being left unclaimed and refused by family members, was donated to the University of Tennessee in Knoxville's Body Farm in June 2012.

On July 30, 2012, the FBI announced that it had paid out reward money to several individuals for information leading to the capture of Mayes.

== Background of perpetrators ==
Adam Christopher Mayes (September 2, 1976 – May 10, 2012) was the youngest of six children of Johnny and Mary Frances Mayes. His mother described him as violent and controlling from an early age. He and his wife Teresa lived with his parents in a mobile home in Alpine, Mississippi. Mayes' mother-in-law, Josie Tate, stated that she had repeatedly called police to complain about domestic violence committed by Mayes against his wife, Teresa. Mayes' sister described him as aggressive and untrustworthy, but never thought he would commit such a serious crime.

Both Mayes' mother and wife later wrote that they were afraid of him and that he frequently carried a gun.

Mayes was friendly with the Bain family of Whiteville, Tennessee, and was a frequent visitor to the house. During the manhunt for Mayes, his mother-in-law gave extensive interviews to media outlets and claimed Mayes believed that he was the father of the two younger girls, a claim for which investigators found no evidence. Later interviews with his wife suggest Mayes was instead motivated by an obsession with one of the kidnapped girls. Mayes had been under investigation for domestic abuse and was accused of molesting a seven-year-old girl he babysat in 2010.

== Charges against Teresa Mayes and Mary Mayes ==
Mayes' wife Teresa was charged with murder and kidnapping and faced the death penalty. Her mother claimed that Adam had coerced and brainwashed the intellectually challenged Teresa into abetting his crimes. On May 21, the charges against Mayes' mother, Mary, were changed from four counts of conspiracy to commit especially aggravated kidnapping to two counts of especially aggravated kidnapping. Investigators believe that she "confined" the two girls after her son and his wife drove them from their Tennessee home to the Mayes' Mississippi home. The court ordered a psychological evaluation of both Mary and Teresa Mayes and rescheduled their first hearing for June 19.

On October 1, 2012, Teresa Mayes appeared in a Hardeman County General Sessions Court hearing while a statement that she had given to the Tennessee Bureau of Investigation during her husband's disappearance in May was read to the court. In the statement, Teresa claimed that Adam had planned the kidnappings and murders a year in advance due to his romantic interest in Alexandria Bain, then age 12. Adam sold his motorcycle to pay for the kidnapping and forced Teresa to remain hidden in their car during two aborted attempts to kidnap Alexandria and her younger sister, Kylilah, on April 25 and 26, 2012. On the night of April 26, she told officials that Adam attempted to kill the girls' father, Gary Bain, by giving him two Tequila Sunrise cocktails laced with Visine and other prescription drugs.

On the night of the murders, Teresa told investigators that Mayes told her to drive around with the two younger girls, Alexandra and Kylilah. She said that when she returned, her husband was outside the Bain house with two bodies wrapped in a tarp. He later told Teresa that he had entered the Bain house, woke Jo Ann, and told her to come out to the shop by the house because Kylilah was sleepwalking. Once in the shop, Mayes said that he hit Jo Ann with a board and strangled her with a rope. Afterward, he smothered Adrienne, age 14. Teresa and her husband drove the two younger girls and the two corpses to Guntown, where Adam buried the bodies in his mother's backyard.

Following Teresa Mayes' and Mary Mayes' court appearances on October 1, the judge sent their cases to a grand jury scheduled to convene on January 10, 2013.

On August 9, the two women were sentenced in conjunction with a plea bargain. Teresa Mayes was sentenced to 35 years and her mother-in-law, Mary Mayes, to 13 1/2 years for their parts in the kidnappings and murders.

In 2016, both Mary and Teresa Mayes were moved to the Women's Therapeutic Residential Center within West Tennessee State Penitentiary due to good behavior.
