= Lamont Stephenson =

American former fugitive (born 1975)

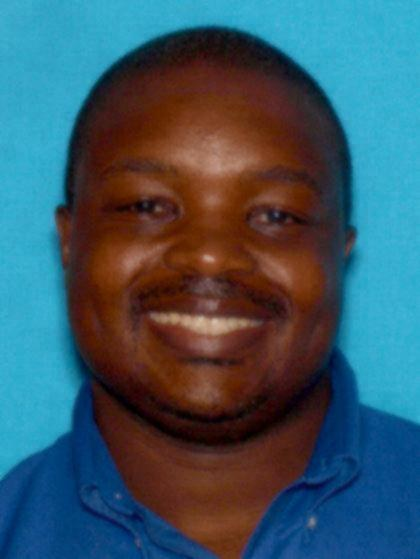

FBI Ten Most Wanted Fugitive
- Charges: First-Degree Murder (a felony); Unlawful Flight to Avoid Prosecution
- Reward: $100,000

Description
- Born: April 3, 1975 (age 51); New Jersey, U.S.
- Nationality: American
- Gender: Male
- Height: 5 ft 6-7 in (168-170 cm)
- Weight: 220 lb (100 kg)

Status
- Convictions: Murder; Cruelty to animals
- Penalty: 31.5 years in prison
- Status: Incarcerated
- Added: October 11, 2018
- Caught: March 7, 2019
- Number: 521
- Captured

Lamont Stephenson (born April 3, 1975) is an American former fugitive who was added to the FBI Ten Most Wanted Fugitives list on October 11, 2018. He was wanted for the murder of his fiancée, Olga Ivette DeJesus, on October 17, 2014, in Newark, New Jersey. He also killed her dog in the attack. Stephenson was the 521st fugitive to be placed on the FBI's Ten Most Wanted Fugitives list. He was captured in Maryland on March 7, 2019, as authorities were investigating a suspicious vehicle. Police say that he was also wanted in a second homicide committed on March 6, 2019.

== Background ==
Lamont Stephenson was born on April 3, 1975, in New Jersey. He attended the same high school as Olga DeJesus, and reunited with her at their 20th Bloomfield Tech high school reunion. The two eventually got engaged. DeJesus had two children, while Stephenson had four children from two previous marriages. According to DeJesus' family, the couple was very happy together and were due to marry in 2016. Stephenson had no criminal history on record.

== Murder ==
The body of 40-year-old Olga Ivette DeJesus was found on October 17, 2014, in her apartment at the Stephen Crane housing complex in Newark. After not receiving contact from her mother, DeJesus' daughter went to check on her. Upon arrival, she spotted DeJesus' dog lying dead near the front door. DeJesus' cousin found Olga dead in her bedroom. Both DeJesus and her dog had died from asphyxiation. DeJesus was pronounced dead at the scene and was transported to University Hospital.

According to authorities, Stephenson murdered DeJesus and killed her dog. Then he left the apartment complex and called a cab. Stephenson took the cab to Penn Station in Newark where he was seen on surveillance video. Authorities believe he left the station via bus or train. On November 3, 2014, Stephenson was charged with homicide. A federal arrest warrant was issued for him on September 8, 2017. Authorities believed he was hiding in North Carolina, Virginia, or South Carolina.

== Capture ==
On March 7, 2019, the Prince George's County Police Department in Maryland announced that Stephenson had been arrested. Stephenson was reportedly arrested just hours after having killed another woman, Natina Kiah, who was his new girlfriend. Kiah had been stabbed to death in her apartment along with her cat. On July 29, 2021, in a plea agreement, Stephenson was sentenced 31.5 years in prison without the possibility of parole, 30 years for killing Olga DeJesus and 18 months for killing her dog.
