= Fidel Urbina =

Mexican national former fugitive (born 1975)

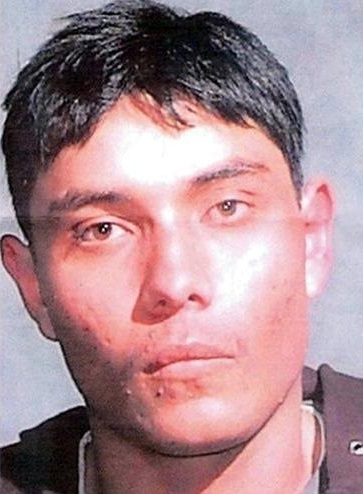

FBI Ten Most Wanted Fugitive
- Charges: First degree murder, kidnapping, Unlawful Flight to Avoid Prosecution, sexual assault, failure to appear
- Reward: US$100,000
- Alias: Lorenzo Maes, Fernando Ramos, Fidel Bahena, Fidel Urbina Aguirre, Lorenzo Fidel, Lorenzo M. Maes, Marcos Antonio, Victor Urbina, "Tonorio"

Description
- Born: April 24, 1975 (age 51); Mexico
- Race: Hispanic
- Gender: Male
- Height: 5 ft 11 in (1.80 m) – 6 ft 1 in (1.85 m)
- Weight: 165 lb (75 kg) – 175 lb (79 kg)
- Occupation: Auto mechanic

Status
- Added: June 5, 2012
- Caught: September 22, 2016
- Number: 497
- Captured

Fidel Urbina (born April 24, 1975) is a Mexican national former fugitive who was added to the FBI Ten Most Wanted Fugitives list in June 2012.

== Background ==
Urbina is a Mexican national who was working in Chicago as a car mechanic. In March 1998, he allegedly raped a Chicago waitress in her car and home. Seven months later—while free on bond—he sexually assaulted and murdered 22-year-old Gabriella Torres, whose body was found in the trunk of a burned-out car in a Chicago alley.

== Disappearance ==
Urbina had been the subject of a manhunt since 1999 despite reported sightings in Mexico. A $100,000 reward was offered for information leading to Urbina's arrest.

Urbina was captured on September 22, 2016, in Chihuahua, Mexico, after 17 years on the run.

In 2017, Urbina was extradited to Chicago and charged with first-degree murder, kidnapping, aggravated kidnapping, unlawful restraint, criminal sexual assault and aggravated criminal sexual assault.
