= Bhadreshkumar Chetanbhai Patel =

Indian fugitive (born 1990)

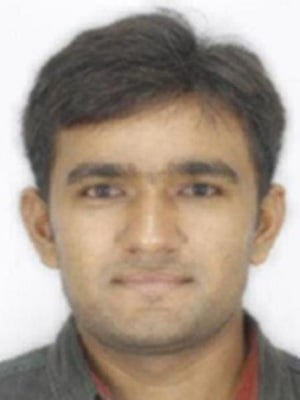
- Undated photograph of Patel

FBI Ten Most Wanted Fugitive
- Charges: First-degree murder; Second-degree Murder; First-degree assault; Second-degree assault; Use of a dangerous weapon with intent to injure; Unlawful flight to avoid prosecution
- Reward: $1,000,000

Description
- Born: May 15, 1990 (age 35); Viramgam, Gujarat, India
- Nationality: Indian
- Gender: Male
- Height: 5 ft 9 in (1.75 m)
- Weight: 165–170 lb (75–77 kg)
- Spouse: Palak Patel (m. 2013; died 2015)

Status
- Added: April 18, 2017
- Number: 514
- Currently a Top Ten Fugitive

Bhadreshkumar Chetanbhai Patel (born May 15, 1990) is an Indian fugitive wanted under suspicion of murdering his wife Palak Patel at a Dunkin' Donuts store in Hanover, Maryland, in the United States on April 13, 2015. He was last seen at Newark Penn Station in Newark, New Jersey, the day after the killing. He was added to the FBI Ten Most Wanted Fugitives list on April 18, 2017. Bhadreshkumar was the 514th fugitive to be placed on the FBI's Ten Most Wanted Fugitives list.

== Background ==
Bhadreshkumar Chetanbhai Patel was born on May 15, 1990 in Viramgam, Gujarat, India. In November 2013, he married Palak Patel, and the couple came together to visit relatives in the United States in September 2014. Bhadreshkumar was 24 at the time, while Palak was 21.

== Killing ==
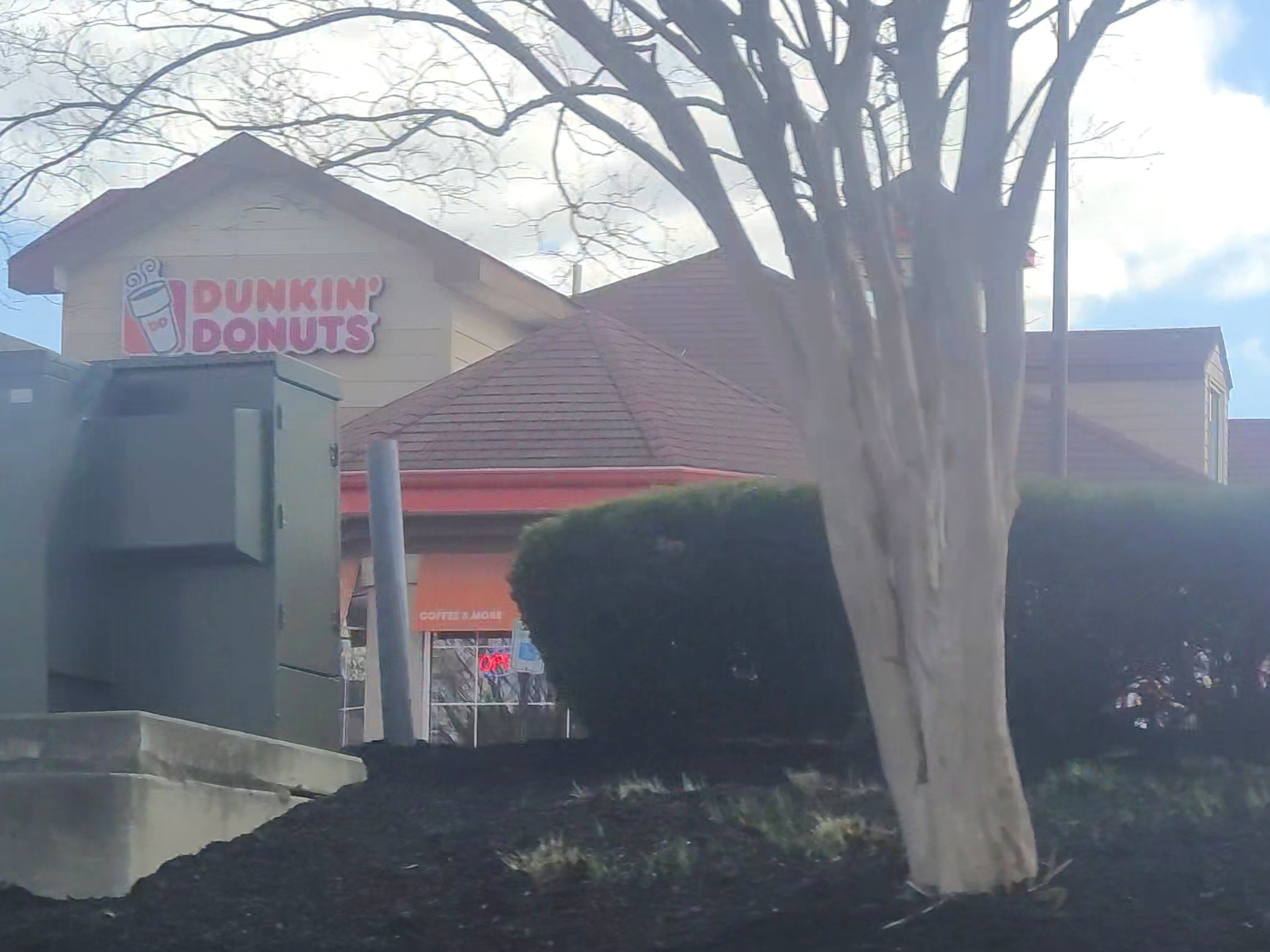
The Dunkin' Donuts in Hanover, Maryland, where the killing took place

On the night of April 12, 2015, Bhadreshkumar and Palak were working a night shift at a Dunkin' Donuts located on Arundel Mills Boulevard in Hanover, Maryland. The store was owned by a relative of Bhadreshkumar whom the couple were visiting. Surveillance footage showed Bhadreshkumar and Palak walking together in the kitchen at around 9:30 p.m. before disappearing out of view behind some racks. Moments later, Bhadreshkumar re-emerged without his wife, turned off an oven, and left the store.

The body of 21-year-old Palak Patel was found later that night. She had been beaten to death and stabbed multiple times with a large kitchen knife. Investigators believe the couple had an argument, with Palak wanting to return to India and Bhadreshkumar wishing to remain in the U.S. instead.

== Aftermath ==
Customers arriving at the Dunkin' Donuts store grew concerned when no employees came to serve them. A police officer who happened to be near the store was approached by concerned customers and checked out the scene. Upon searching the store, the officer found Palak's body. Police then checked the surveillance video and realized the killer was likely Bhadreshkumar, who had vanished. Bhadreshkumar was not identified as the suspect until over an hour after the killing, giving him time to escape.

After the killing of Palak, Bhadreshkumar fled the store and returned to his nearby apartment on foot. He took some personal items and then got a cab to a hotel near Newark Liberty International Airport. The taxi driver reported that Bhadreshkumar was very calm during the journey. He checked into a hotel in Newark and was seen on surveillance video at the counter paying in cash for a room. He checked out the following morning.

Bhadreshkumar was last seen on the morning of April 13, 2015, around 10 a.m. at Newark Penn Station in New Jersey. He took a hotel shuttle to the station and has not been seen since.

== Investigation ==
Authorities believe Bhadreshkumar could have fled the country or could be hiding with relatives. He had a visa to be in the U.S., but it had expired by the time he carried out the killing. A report stated that because of this, there was no indication he was able to legally leave the country.

An investigation with Palak's family into the killing revealed that the last conversation she had with them was about wishing to return home to India. This call was made moments before Palak was killed and had been overheard by Bhadreshkumar. Police believe that Bhadreshkumar then argued with his wife and killed her for this reason.

Bhadreshkumar has connections in Canada and India and the U.S. states of New Jersey, Kentucky, Georgia, and Illinois. He is considered armed and extremely dangerous. A reward of up to $1,000,000 is available for information that leads to his whereabouts.

== See also ==
- List of fugitives from justice who disappeared
