= Robert William Fisher =

American fugitive (born 1961)

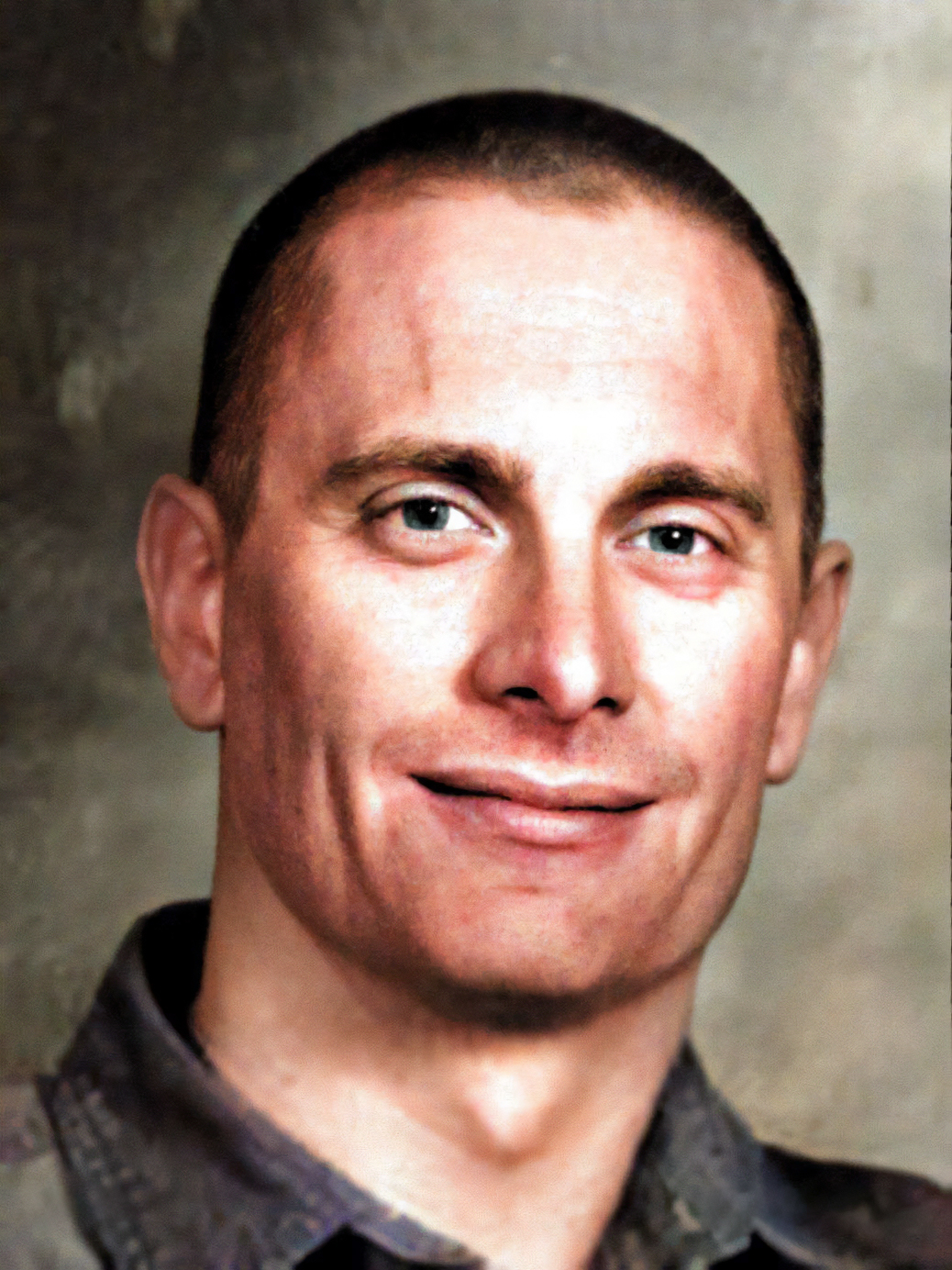
- Photograph taken in 1999

FBI Ten Most Wanted Fugitive
- Charges: First-degree murder (3 counts) (a felony); Unlawful flight to avoid prosecution; First-degree arson (a felony)
- Alias: Bobby Fisher

Description
- Born: Robert William Fisher; April 13, 1961 (age 65); New York City, U.S.
- Height: 6 ft 1 in (185 cm)
- Weight: 200 lb (91 kg)
- Occupation: Surgical technician, respiratory therapist and firefighter
- Parents: William Fisher; Jan Howell
- Siblings: 2
- Spouse: Mary Cooper (m. 1987; died 2001)
- Children: Brittney Fisher; Robert William Fisher Jr.

Status
- Added: June 29, 2002
- Removed: November 3, 2021
- Number: 475
- Removed from Top Ten Fugitive List

Robert William Fisher (born April 13, 1961) is an American fugitive who is wanted for the murder of his wife and their two children on the night of April 9–10, 2001, in Scottsdale, Arizona.

Fisher served in the United States Navy and later worked as a firefighter and in the medical field. He married Mary Cooper in 1987, and they had two children, Bobby and Brittney. The Fishers had a difficult family life. Fisher was described as displaying cruel and controlling conduct towards his family and on many occasions was reported to have exhibited disturbing and violent behavior. He was unfaithful to his wife at least once. His own parents had divorced when Fisher was 15, and this was believed to have played a role in the difficulties that he later experienced.

On April 10, 2001, the family's home was destroyed in a gas explosion. Inside, Fisher's wife and two children were found dead. Their throats had been slit, and Mary had been shot in the back of her head. Fisher was absent, along with Mary's car. Police named him as their only suspect in the killings. On April 20, Mary's car was discovered in a forest near Young, Arizona. Fisher's ultimate fate is unknown. On June 29, 2002, he was named by the FBI as the 475th fugitive to be placed on its Ten Most Wanted list. On November 3, 2021, Fisher was removed from the FBI's Most Wanted Fugitives List. As of 2026, Fisher remains a wanted fugitive.

== Early life ==
Robert William Fisher was born on April 13, 1961, in Brooklyn, New York City. His father was William Fisher, a banker, and his mother was Jan Howell. They had three children: Robert and two daughters. The parents divorced in 1976, when Robert was 15; after this, he and his sisters went to live with their father in Arizona. All three attended Sahuaro High School in Tucson, Arizona. According to friends and relatives, the divorce was turbulent and had long-lasting effects on him. A friend from high school stated Robert was "very bitter" about it. Fisher reportedly spoke of his parents' separation with co-workers at Mayo Clinic Hospital close to the time of the murders, and once confided to an associate that his life would have been different had Jan not left the family.

== Adult life ==
Fisher enlisted in the United States Navy and attempted to become part of the SEALs, but was not successful. Fisher worked as a firefighter in California but was forced to retire after a back injury. He then moved his family to Arizona and began a career in the medical field. He worked as a surgical catheter technician, and respiratory therapist. Fisher worked as a weed sprayer for a time in the late 1980s. A man who employed him recalled that he was a quiet man and suffered from serious back pain but was a good employee. Fisher was a surgical technician at a Mayo Clinic in Scottsdale at the time of the murders.

Fisher married Mary Cooper in 1987. The couple had two children: a daughter Brittney and a son Bobby. He was described as a cruel and distant control freak toward his family. He and his wife fought about sex and money, with Mary taking a job that she told friends was a "security fund." Fisher once turned a garden hose on Mary after he perceived her to have spoken out of turn. Fisher was embarrassed that Bobby did not like to hunt or fish, and once tried to teach him and Brittney how to swim by throwing them off a boat. Hunting partner Sandy Gillespie said, "They were crying, and Brittney was screaming, and he pulled them back in the boat and he said, 'Now there, how's that?'" Fisher would not allow the walls in the house to be painted anything other than white, and only a small number of pictures were allowed on the wall. "Several times her mother had made special things, like quilts," Mary's friend, Kimberly Sue Davidson, told police. "She was not allowed to hang them up. She had to store them in the closet. And then he would continually tell her, isn't it time you got rid of this stuff?" Fisher nonetheless tried to hold on to an image as a devoted family man.

Mary's mother, Ginny Cooper, told investigators, "Fisher didn't socialize often with family because of a fear of getting too close to people and losing them." Fisher's mother Jan told investigators that she had been a "yes-sir" wife who did not stand up to Fisher's father. She added that she saw similar dynamics early in Fisher's marriage to Mary and that she had spoken to her about her concerns. A close friend of his stated that his family bore a striking resemblance to that of his childhood.

Fisher had been an outdoorsman and a hunter since he was a young adult. Friends noticed him exhibiting disturbing behavior on hunting trips and other outdoor activities. In one case, after killing an elk, he began smearing its blood on his face. On at least one occasion, he sneaked up behind a family that was picnicking and emptied his gun into the air. Several years before his wife and children were murdered, Fisher shot a stray pit bull. He claimed that he shot it because it attacked his Labrador Retriever, but police maintained that he orchestrated the encounter because he wanted to shoot the dog. Fisher had been an active participant in the Scottsdale Baptist Church's men's ministry, but (in contrast to Mary) had begun to withdraw from church activities a few months prior to the murders. According to some of Fisher's friends, Fisher spoke of committing suicide around 1998 when he despaired over the condition of his marriage. In 1998, the Fishers went to the senior pastor for marital counseling. Fisher told coworkers about a one-night affair with a prostitute he met in a massage parlor. He fretted that Mary would find out that it was the cause of a urinary tract infection that left him ill for several days in December 2000. "They did not have a happy marriage," said Wade Rencsok, a former neighbor. "They screamed constantly. Everybody heard it. You could hear it in the house next door, and you never really heard him scream, which is kind of weird. I mean he had a way about him, but you never heard him scream. You always heard his wife screaming. Things like, 'You're worthless. I could have done better than you. We should get a divorce.'"

Fisher told a hunting companion that he was renewing his commitment to his faith and marriage because he "could not live without his family", possibly hinting that he would consider suicide over divorce. According to psychologists, an intense fear of loss is not unusual among individuals who were traumatized by a divorce in adolescence. Mary told several friends that she was going to divorce Fisher in the weeks before her murder.

== Triple homicide and arson ==
A neighbor reported hearing a loud argument coming from inside the Fisher home at 10 pm on April 9, 2001, approximately ten hours before it exploded into flames. Police theorized that the murders took place between 9:30 pm and 10:15 pm. At 10:43 pm, Fisher was spotted on an ATM camera, where he withdrew $280. Mary's Toyota 4Runner was in the background. It is possible that Fisher later returned to the house to commit the murders, but police believe that they had already taken place by then because he was using Mary's car, in which he is alleged to have fled. A 2025 media inquiry claimed to have consulted two previously uncontacted witnesses, one of whom said that they saw Mary's car parked outside the Fisher residence at 3:30 in the morning, and another at 5:30, which would confirm that he went home after withdrawing funds from the ATM, and giving him a head start of no more than about three hours prior to the explosion.

Mary Fisher was shot in the back of the head and had her throat cut. Brittney and Bobby's throats were cut, but they did not display signs of having been shot. At 8:42 am, the house exploded. Firefighters were immediately alerted to the explosion, which was strong enough to collapse the front brick wall and rattle the frames of neighboring houses for one-half mile (800 m) in all directions. Before firefighters arrived, neighbors used garden hoses to try to keep the flames under control. Firefighters kept the 20-foot-high (6 m) blaze from spreading to other houses. A series of smaller secondary explosions, believed to be caused by either rifle ammunition or paint cans, forced them to keep their distance. One firefighter suffered minor injuries to his leg when he lost his balance and fell near the blaze.

The gas line from the back of the house's furnace had been pulled. The accumulating gas was later ignited by a candle that Fisher had allegedly lit, waiting for the gas to accumulate and descend to the flame hours after being lit. This delayed fuse would have given him an approximate ten-hour head start in his attempt to evade law enforcement. The decision to have the house explode is believed to have been an attempt by Fisher to conceal evidence of his crimes and possibly to cause police to believe that he had died. The burned bodies of a woman and two children were found lying in bed in the burned-out remains. They were identified as Mary (age 38), Brittney (age 12), and Bobby (age 10). Investigators theorized that Fisher murdered his family because he felt threatened by Mary's intention to divorce him, and did not want Brittney and Bobby to go through what he did as a child.

== Investigation ==
=== Developments in investigation ===
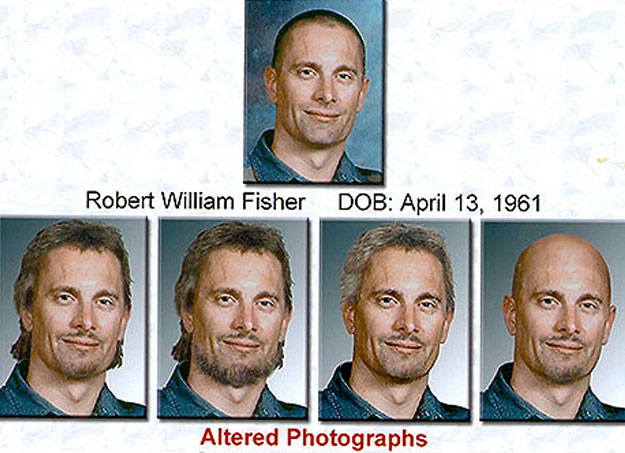
Initial FBI wanted poster, along with composite images created by the FBI to show how Fisher may try to disguise himself.

Fisher, who disappeared at the time of the murders, was named as an official (and to date, the only) person of interest in the case on April 14, 2001, when Arizona Department of Public Safety officers were instructed in a statewide bulletin to arrest him. On April 20, the last physical evidence of his whereabouts surfaced when police found Mary's Toyota 4Runner in Tonto National Forest near Young and Payson, one hundred miles north of Scottsdale. The family dog Blue was found outside the car. It had taken shelter beneath the car and was in a hungry and agitated state. An Oakland Raiders hat identical to the one that Fisher was seen wearing in the ATM footage was inside the vehicle. A pile of human excrement was found near the passenger door. Although police searched the area immediately around where the vehicle was discovered, they searched only one out of dozens of nearby caves. Some of these caves form a complex underground network, extending for miles beneath the surface. Several professional cavers have suggested that Fisher used them as a hiding place before either escaping, killing himself, or dying from low oxygen levels. Professional cavers have visited these caves many times in the years since the murders, but no sign of Fisher has ever been found.

The Toyota was discovered less than a mile from the Fort Apache Indian Reservation, an area which police never searched. Police followed a set of footprints that led onto the reservation, but uncovered no sign of Fisher. A couple reported seeing a man resembling Fisher walking along the nearby Young Road several days before the discovery of the car. According to them, when the woman saw him, she said to her husband, "That looks like Robert Fisher." However, they waited until after the vehicle was found to report the tip. Lori Greenbeck, an acquaintance of the Fisher family, said that her husband had gone camping with Fisher in the area where the truck was found shortly before April 10. She said that her husband believed that Fisher was scouting the area. According to her, he was very familiar with the region.

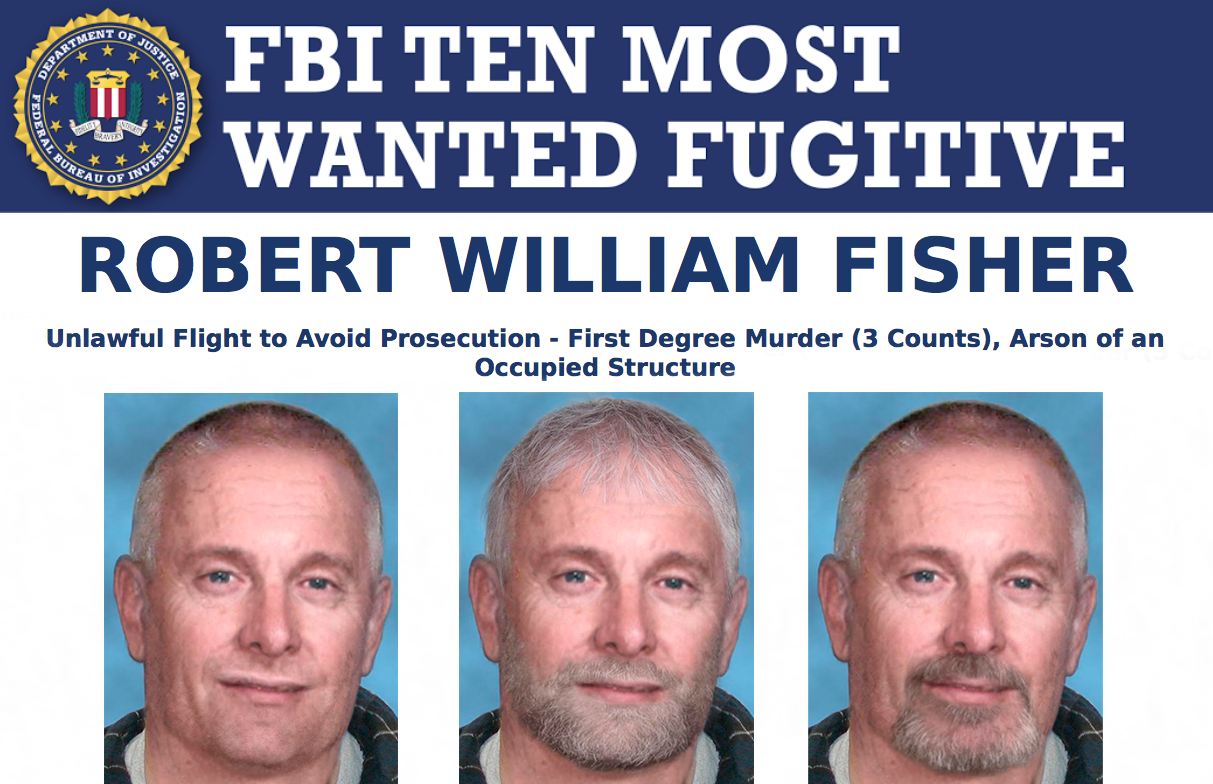
Age-altered images of what Fisher may look like years after his disappearance

On July 19, a state arrest warrant was issued in Phoenix, charging Fisher with three counts of first-degree murder and one count of arson. Subsequently, he was declared a fugitive and a federal arrest warrant was issued by the United States District Court for the District of Arizona, charging him with unlawful flight to avoid prosecution. On June 29, 2002, Fisher was named by the Federal Bureau of Investigation (FBI) as the 475th fugitive to be placed on its Ten Most Wanted list. He was also on America's Most Wanted's "Dirty Dozen", the list of its most notorious fugitives, and was profiled on The Hunt with John Walsh. The FBI offers a reward of up to $100,000 for information leading to Fisher's capture. By April 2003, the FBI had received "hundreds and hundreds of leads." However, all reported sightings of Fisher have been either inconclusive or false.

In the years immediately following Fisher's disappearance, some people living in his old neighborhood reported seeing a man resembling him driving in the area. In February 2004, an individual with a striking physical resemblance to Fisher was arrested in Vancouver, Canada, by the Royal Canadian Mounted Police. The man had a missing tooth where Fisher had a gold bicuspid, as well as a surgical scar on his back, as Fisher had. However, his fingerprints did not match. He was held by Canadian police for approximately one week until a relative correctly identified him. Responding to speculation that his fingerprints had been altered, Scottsdale Detective John Kirkham said that there was no scarring on them to suggest this. The man's identity was not released. The FBI alerted local law enforcement in 2012 that Fisher may have been living in the area near where Mary's car was discovered. In October 2014, police raided a house in Commerce City, Colorado, after receiving a tip that he was hiding there. Police arrested two occupants for unrelated reasons but found no sign of Fisher.

In April 2016, FBI officials and Scottsdale police displayed new age-enhanced photos of Fisher during a news conference on the fifteenth anniversary of the murders.

On November 3, 2021, Fisher was removed from the FBI Top 10 Most Wanted List. He was replaced by Yulan Adonay Archaga Carias, the alleged leader of MS-13 in Honduras, and the 526th addition to the Top Ten List. "Because the extensive publicity Fisher's case received during its nearly 20 years on the list has not resulted in his successful location and/or capture, the case no longer fulfills that requirement," the FBI said. Despite his removal from the Top Ten List, Fisher remains a wanted fugitive.

=== Theories and speculation ===
The murders allegedly committed by Fisher and his subsequent disappearance have attracted significant attention, and numerous theories have spawned about what ultimately happened to him. Due in part to factors such as the length of time that has gone by since his disappearance, the small amount of money that Fisher is believed to have had with him, and the fact that he had spoken of ending his life before, there has been speculation that he committed suicide or died, probably somewhere in the wilderness where Mary's car was discovered, and that the body was never found. Others disagree and maintain that he most likely survived. It is thought that he may have started a new life under an assumed identity. In that case, he may have died after years as a fugitive without his remains being identified.

If Fisher did survive, it is thought that he may have hitchhiked out of the area or had aid from an accomplice. There is a theory that Fisher may have used his survival skills to continue living in the wilderness near Payson where his wife's car was discovered, although police and survival experts are skeptical due to the difficulty of finding food and shelter in that environment as well as the fact that no evidence has ever emerged of someone living in the woods in that area. "He could be living in a small town, where he gets paid cash and he works as a handyman," said Detective John Heinzelman. "Or he could be in a big city and blend in." It was postulated that Fisher may have crossed the southern United States border. Fisher's disappearance took place before the September 11 attacks. With border security being more lax at that time than it would later become, police have considered this a reasonable possibility. A hostile encounter occurred in Guatemala in 2009 between tourists and a man said to resemble Fisher. Police have speculated that Fisher may have started a new family, and have cited the fear that he might eventually decide to leave and annihilate that family like he did his original family as one of their chief reasons for continuing to search for him. Some police have however conceded that they may never learn what happened to Fisher. "Maybe this is the best we have, knowing he did it, and never finding him again," said Heintzelman.

FBI agent Bob Caldwell's sense of his personality and habits is that he is "arrogant. He's cocky. He's a know-it-all...and a loner." Fisher has been known to chew tobacco and favors the Copenhagen brand. His look has been described as average, but he sometimes walks in an odd, erect manner with his chest out due to a back problem stemming from the injury that he suffered as a firefighter, and is an avid hunter and fisherman. Fisher is considered armed and extremely dangerous and has ties to Florida and New Mexico.

== In popular culture ==
Fisher is the subject of a documentary, Where Is Robert Fisher?, released in 2011. It relies heavily on interviews with journalists and detectives, and it features interviews with one of his sisters and a neighbor. The documentary includes home footage of Fisher taken by Mary.

== See also ==
- List of fugitives from justice who disappeared
- Bradford Bishop
- John List (murderer)
