= Alejandro Castillo (criminal) =

American former fugitive (born 1998)

FBI Ten Most Wanted Fugitive
- Charges: First degree murder; Unlawful Flight to Avoid Prosecution
- Reward: $250,000
- Alias: Alexandro Castillo; Alex Castillo; Alejandro Rosales; Alejandro Castillo; Alejandro Rosales-Castillo; Alejandro Rosalescastillo

Description
- Born: November 26, 1998 (age 27); Arizona, U.S.
- Race: Hispanic
- Gender: Male
- Height: 167 cm (5 ft 6 in)
- Weight: 81 to 86 kg
- Occupation: Restaurant worker

Status
- Added: October 24, 2017
- Caught: January 16, 2026
- Number: 516
- Captured

Alejandro Rosales Castillo (born November 26, 1998) is an American former fugitive who was added to the FBI Ten Most Wanted Fugitives list on October 24, 2017. He was wanted for the August 2016 murder of Truc Quan "Sandy" Ly Le in Charlotte, North Carolina. Castillo was the 516th fugitive to be placed on the FBI's Ten Most Wanted Fugitives list. The FBI offered a reward of up to $250,000 for information leading to his capture. He was captured in Pachuca, Mexico, on January 16, 2026, after spending nearly ten years on the run.

== Background ==
Castillo was born on November 26, 1998, in Arizona. He speaks fluent English and Spanish. In 2016, a then-17-year-old Castillo worked at a Showmars restaurant in Charlotte, North Carolina, and was co-workers with 23-year-old Truc Quan Ly "Sandy" Le. The two reportedly briefly dated and at some point Le had lent Castillo some money which he never paid back to her. Another co-worker of theirs was 19-year-old Ahmia Feaster, who was Castillo's new girlfriend after his split from Le.

== Disappearance and murder ==
On August 9, 2016, Castillo texted Le saying that he would like to repay her the money she had previously loaned him. Le agreed to meet Castillo at a QuikTrip located on Eastway Drive in Charlotte. Castillo was picked up that afternoon by Feaster, who collected him in her red Dodge Caliber and took him to the meeting. Le was last seen alive at the QuikTrip where she agreed to meet Castillo. It is believed that instead of repaying her, Castillo forced Le to withdraw all the money from her bank account, possibly with a gun. According to Le's uncle, her bank statements showed that she withdrew $1,000 from an ATM. After this withdrawal, there was no money left in her bank account. Investigators believe that Castillo then drove Le to a wooded area in Cabarrus County where he shot her once in the head, killing her. Her body was then dumped in a ravine. Castillo and Feaster then fled in Le's black 4-door 2003 Toyota Corolla.

== Aftermath ==
After the murder, Castillo and Feaster drove from North Carolina to Phoenix, Arizona. They parked Le's car at a bus shelter in Phoenix, where it was later found abandoned on August 15. Castillo and Feaster then traveled to Nogales, Arizona, where they crossed the border into Mexico. Surveillance footage captured Castillo crossing the border into Mexico.

== Investigation ==
Le was reported missing the day after she was murdered, and Castillo and Feaster were reported missing on August 11 and 12. Feaster's Dodge Caliber was found abandoned on August 13 in the 11000 block of Dulin Creek Boulevard in Charlotte. Later that day, Feaster and Castillo reportedly called their families saying they were safe but did not know where they were. After receiving the phone calls, both families believed that the pair were being held captive and were forced to make the phone calls.

On August 17, 2016, the body of Le was found in a wooded area in Cabarrus County. She had been shot once in the head. Investigators say they believe the motive for the murder was simply robbery. On November 2, 2016, Castillo was charged with first degree murder. He was later charged with unlawful flight to avoid prosecution on February 10, 2017. Investigators believed that Castillo was hiding somewhere in Mexico. They presumed he was either in the cities of San Francisco de los Romo or Pabellón de Arteaga in the state of Aguascalientes, or in the states of Guanajuato or Veracruz.

On October 20, 2016, Feaster turned herself in to authorities in Aguascalientes, Mexico. She got in touch with her mother, who cooperated with U.S. authorities and arranged for her to be collected at an airport. On October 22, Feaster was extradited back to the U.S. and was arrested by the Harris County Sheriff's Office near Houston, Texas. She was charged with accessory after the fact of felony murder and larceny of a motor vehicle. Her bond was set at $25,000 for a larceny of a motor vehicle and $100,000 for accessory after the fact. She was eventually transferred to Mecklenburg County Jail where she posted bond and was released on January 18, 2017. According to Feaster, both she and Castillo had been staying with Castillo's cousins in Aguascalientes. At some point during the two months they spent there, Castillo disappeared. Castillo was featured on the February 26, 2024, episode of America's Most Wanted.

== Capture ==
Castillo was captured on January 16, 2026, in Pachuca, Mexico. On January 23, he was brought back to Charlotte and was held in the Mecklenburg County jail. He appeared in court on January 26, where a judge ordered that he be held without bond.
