= Terry A. D. Strickland =

American convicted murderer

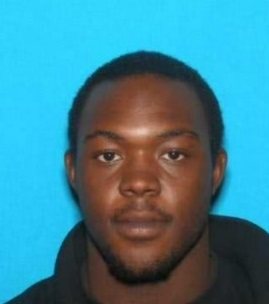

FBI Ten Most Wanted Fugitive
- Charges: Homicide, unlawful flight to avoid prosecution
- Alias: Teery A. Strickland, Terry A. Strickland, Terry Antonio Strickland

Description
- Born: February 15, 1992 (age 34); Illinois
- Nationality: American
- Gender: Male
- Occupation: Laborer

Status
- Convictions: Guilty
- Penalty: 60 years
- Added: December 15, 2016
- Caught: January 15, 2017
- Number: 512
- Captured

Terry A. D. Strickland (born February 15, 1992) is an American convicted murderer who was arrested for the murder of two men in July 2016. On December 15, 2016, Strickland was added to the FBI's Top Ten Most Wanted list. Strickland was arrested in El Paso, Texas, on January 15, 2017.

== Capture ==
Strickland was arrested in El Paso, Texas, on January 15, 2017, by city FBI agents and policemen. He was apprehended without incident during a traffic stop at 5:10 a.m. MT and booked into the El Paso county jail. The FBI's public tip line was contacted earlier in the month suggesting that Strickland was living in the city.

Strickland was extradited back to Wisconsin following his arrest in Texas. In June 2017, Strickland was found guilty of two counts of first-degree reckless homicide. He was sentenced the following month to 60 years in prison.
