= Walter Yovany Gomez =

American former fugitive

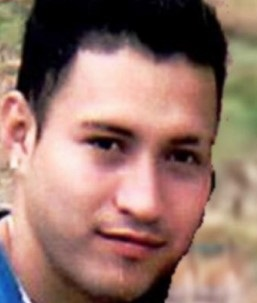

FBI Ten Most Wanted Fugitive
- Charges: Murder; Racketeering
- Reward: $100,000
- Alias: "Cholo"; Walter Rios Gomez; Walter Yovany Rios Gomez "Geovany"; Jesus Lopez Centoreo

Description
- Born: 1980s Honduras
- Occupation: MS-13 gang member

Status
- Convictions: 25 years in prison
- Added: April 12, 2017
- Caught: August 11, 2017
- Number: 513
- Captured

Walter Yovany Gomez is a Honduran American criminal and member of the MS-13 gang who was added to the FBI Ten Most Wanted Fugitives List on April 12, 2017, for murdering Julio Matute in Plainfield, New Jersey on May 8, 2011. He was captured in August 2017 in Woodbridge, Virginia, and was sentenced to 25 years in prison.

== Early years ==
Gomez was born in Honduras in the 1980s. At some point, he illegally immigrated to the United States and lived in New Jersey. Sometime before 2008, Gomez joined the Plainfield Locos Salvatrucha (PLS) crew under the MS-13 gang, and soon befriended Julio Matute. Beginning in December 2008, Gomez got involved in racketeering.

== Murder ==
On May 8, 2011, Gomez and Cruz "Bruja" Flores met Julio Matute, a fellow MS-13 member who was suspected of being an informant for a rival gang. The Gomez and Flores several alcoholic drinks at the Matute's home in Plainfield, New Jersey. While they were talking, Gomez and Flores struck Matute with a bat, sliced his throat, and stabbed him 17 times with a screwdriver. The men then fled the scene. Matute's body was found on the afternoon of May 15, and was identified three days later. Following the murder, Gomez went on the run. He initially drove to Maryland, and hid variously between Maryland and Virginia. He was almost caught by officers but fled by jumping out of a window.

== Arrest ==
On August 11, 2017, FBI and ICE agents arrested Gomez in Woodbridge, Virginia. The FBI was able to track Gomez down using facial recognition technology and via a tip from an unknown individual. Gomez was placed on trial for the racketeering and murder charges and was found guilty. He was sentenced to 25 years in prison.
