= Edwin Ernesto Rivera Gracias =

Salvadoran criminal (born 1984 or 1988)

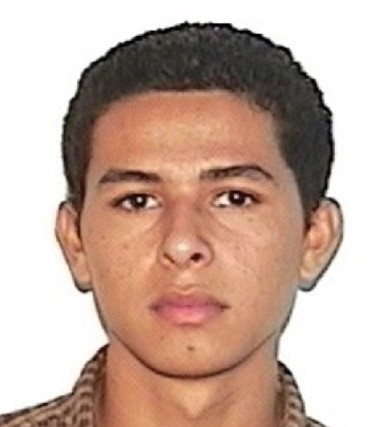

FBI Ten Most Wanted Fugitive
- Reward: US$100,000
- Alias: Edwin Ernesto Rivera-Gracias, Ernest Rivera

Description
- Born: July 4, 1984 or July 4, 1988; El Salvador
- Race: Hispanic
- Gender: Male
- Height: 5 ft 10 in (1.78 m)

Status
- Added: March 14, 2013
- Surrendered: March 27, 2013
- Number: 498
- Surrendered

Edwin Ernesto Rivera Gracias (born July 4, 1984, or July 4, 1988) is a Salvadoran criminal who was a former FBI Ten Most Wanted Fugitive. He surrendered to the police in El Salvador on March 27, 2013.

== Background ==
Rivera Gracias was wanted for first-degree murder in the stabbing death of a 63-year-old Denver resident on August 17, 2011, after which he became sought by the police. He was later added to the FBI's 'Ten Most Wanted' list on March 14, 2013, and was apprehended when he was spotted and arrested in San Salvador, El Salvador on March 27, 2013, after surrendering to avoid an altercation.
