= Bradford Bishop =

American fugitive (born 1936)

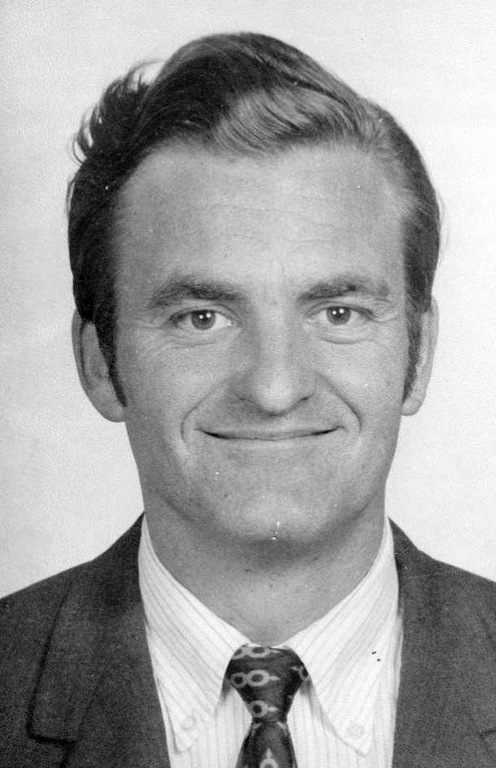
- Bradford Bishop in the mid-1970s

FBI Ten Most Wanted Fugitive
- Charges: Five counts of first-degree murder
- Alias: Bradford Bishop; Brad Bishop; Bradford Bishop Jr.

Description
- Born: William Bradford Bishop Jr. August 1, 1936 (age 90); Pasadena, California, U.S.
- Spouse: Annette Kathryn Weis (m. 1959; died 1976)
- Children: 4

Status
- Added: April 10, 2014
- Removed: June 27, 2018
- Number: 502
- Removed from Top Ten Fugitive List

William Bradford Bishop Jr. (born August 1, 1936) is a former United States Foreign Service officer who has been a fugitive from justice since murdering his wife, mother, and three sons in Bethesda, Maryland, in 1976. On April 10, 2014, the Federal Bureau of Investigation (FBI) placed him on the list of its Ten Most Wanted Fugitives. On June 27, 2018, Bishop, who at the time would have been 81 years old, was removed from the list, making room, the FBI said, for another "dangerous fugitive". However, he is still being actively pursued by the FBI, and an INTERPOL Red Notice is still in effect.

== Biography ==
William Bradford Bishop Jr. was born August 1, 1936, in Pasadena, California, to Lobelia Amaryllis St. Germain and William Bradford Bishop Sr. He attended South Pasadena High School and received a bachelor of science degree in history from Yale University and a master of arts degree in international studies from Middlebury College. Alternatively, Bishop has been reported to have a bachelor's degree in American Studies from Yale and a master's degree in Italian from Middlebury. He also holds a master's degree in African Studies from the University of California, Los Angeles.

After graduating from Yale in 1959, Bishop married his high school sweetheart, Annette Weis, with whom he had three sons. He joined the United States Army and spent four years working in counterintelligence. Bishop spoke five languages fluently: English, Italian, French, Spanish and Serbo-Croatian. After leaving the army, Bishop joined the U.S. Department of State and served in the Foreign Service in many postings overseas. This included postings in the Italian cities of Verona, Milan and Florence (where he did post-graduate work at the University of Florence) from 1968 to 1972. He also served in Africa, including posts in Addis Ababa in Ethiopia and Gaborone in Botswana, from 1972 to 1974. Bishop's last posting, which began in 1974, was at State Department headquarters in Washington, D.C., as an assistant chief in the Division of Special Activities and Commercial Treaties. He was living in Bethesda, Maryland, with his wife and three sons as well as his mother, Lobelia.

== Killings ==
On March 1, 1976, after learning he would not receive a promotion he had sought, Bishop told his secretary that he was feeling unwell and left his office in Foggy Bottom. His last confirmed sighting was outside the State Department by colleague Roy A. Harrell Jr., who noted that Bishop was agitated. Police believe he drove to his bank, where he withdrew several hundred dollars, then to Montgomery Mall, where he bought a ball-peen hammer and gas can; he filled the gas can and the tank of his 1974 Chevrolet station wagon at an adjacent gas station. From there he drove to a hardware store, where he purchased a shovel and pitchfork.

Bishop returned to his home in Bethesda between 7:30 and 8:00 p.m. Police believe he likely killed his wife Annette (37) first, then his mother Lobelia (68) as she returned from walking the family dog. Finally, he killed his three sons — William (14), Brenton (10) and Geoff (5) — while they slept in an upstairs bedroom. Bishop allegedly drove the bodies 275 miles (443 km) in the station wagon to a densely wooded swamp about 5 miles (8.0 km) south of Columbia, North Carolina. On March 2, he dug a shallow hole where he piled the bodies and set them ablaze with gasoline. Forest rangers attracted by smoke found the bodies along with a gas can, a pitchfork and a shovel with a partially legible label bearing the letters OCH HDW (later determined to refer to Poch's Hardware).

Bishop is known to have purchased tennis shoes at a sporting goods store in Jacksonville, North Carolina, later that same day. According to witnesses, he had the family dog with him and was possibly accompanied by a woman described as "dark skinned". On March 10, a neighbor of Bishop's contacted police after having not seen the family for some time. A detective found blood on the front porch of the Bishop residence, on the floor and on the walls of the front hall and in the bedrooms. Dental records were used to confirm that the bodies found in North Carolina belonged to Bishop's family.

On March 18, Bishop's station wagon was found abandoned at an isolated campground in Elkmont, Tennessee, at the Great Smoky Mountains National Park, a few miles from the Appalachian Trail and about 400 miles (640 km) from the site where Bishop's family was buried. The car contained dog biscuits, a bloody blanket, a shotgun, an ax and a shaving kit with Bishop's medication; the trunk's spare-tire well was full of blood. A witness believed the car had been there since anywhere between March 5 to March 7. Police theorized that Bishop joined the flow of hikers on the Appalachian Trail; they attempted to follow his scent with bloodhounds but without success. The following day, a grand jury indicted Bishop on five counts of first degree murder and other charges.

== Psychology ==
=== Motives and stressors ===
Bishop's motives have never been fully explained. A 1977 article in The Washington Post reported that there was "no evidence of infidelity, or financial or job problems." Although Bishop had been passed over for the promotion, there was no history of work-related issues; his being passed over has been described as "the first glitch in the storybook tale". It has been reported that Bishop's career had caused some family tension. According to Harrell, Bishop was frequently criticized by both his wife and his mother over his lack of upward career advancement. He was unhappy at his desk job and interested in another foreign posting, but Annette was reluctant. She had begun to study art at the University of Maryland despite his desire for her to remain a stay-at-home mother.

Most sources agree that the Bishops were experiencing some financial issues, but there has been disagreement as to their severity. The Post reported in 1986 that the issues were "mild" and "familiar to most upwardly mobile families." FBI criminal profiler John E. Douglas described them as "nothing terribly unusual for people in their thirties living in that kind of neighborhood." In 2013, Bethesda Magazine reported that the Internal Revenue Service (IRS) had been auditing the family's taxes due to financial troubles. The existence of an audit has not been confirmed by the IRS or the Federal Bureau of Investigation (FBI).

=== Profile ===
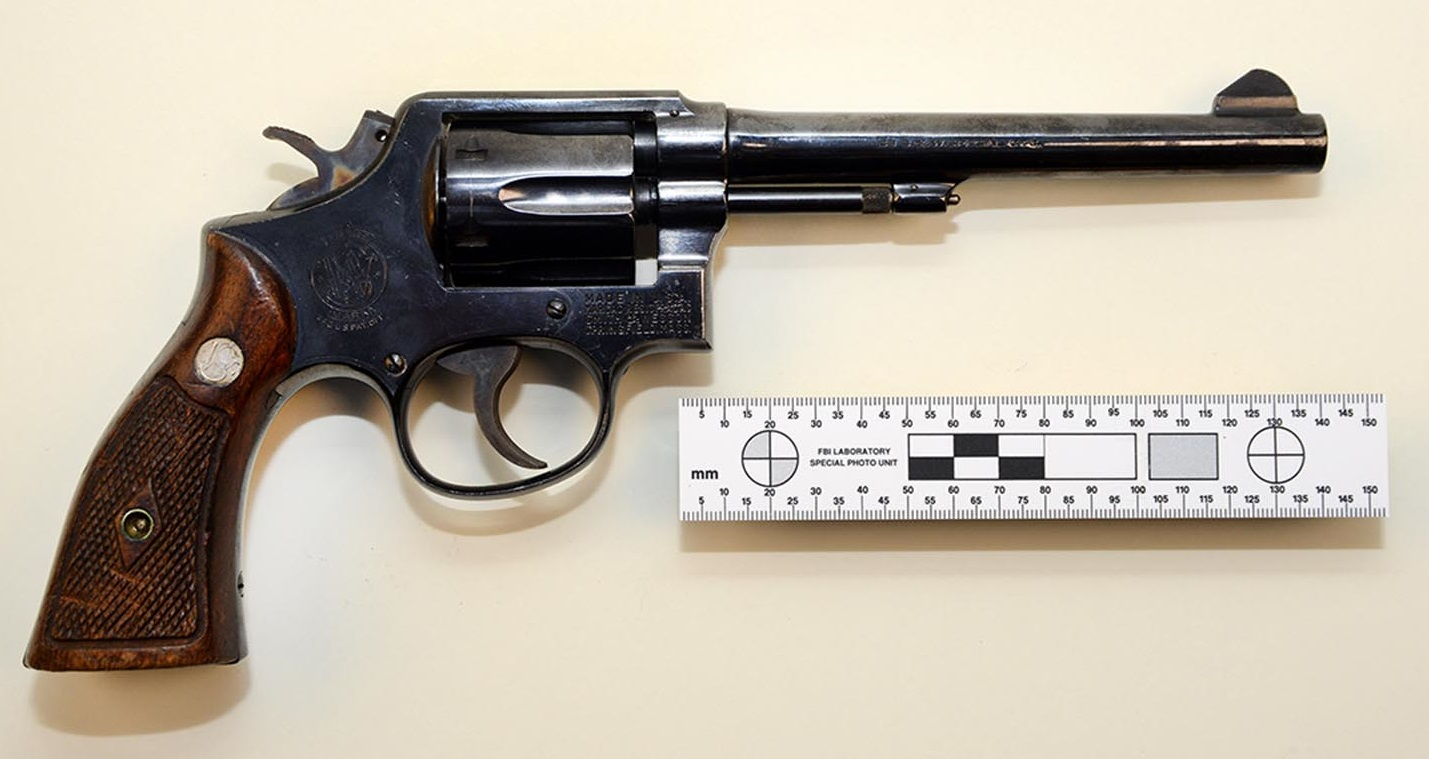
Smith & Wesson .38 caliber revolver in Bishop's case

The FBI states that Bishop is an avid outdoorsman who enjoys camping and hiking, and reports that he has a pilot's license from when he was stationed in Africa. He also enjoys riding motorcycles and working out on a weekly basis. Bishop has a history of depression and insomnia, having been afflicted with both conditions and taking Serax (oxazepam) during the time leading up to the murders. He is fond of dogs. He also enjoys scotch whisky, peanuts and spicy foods. Bishop has a six-inch vertical scar on his lower back from surgery, a cleft chin and a facial mole on his left cheek. He may have had his father's Smith & Wesson M&P .38 Special revolver with the serial number C981967 and his Yale class ring with him when he vanished. He is also believed to have taken his diplomatic passport with him, as his was the only one among the family's diplomatic passports that was missing.

== Possible sightings ==
Bishop had approximately one week of advance time before the authorities began looking for him. It has been suggested that he could have traveled on his diplomatic passport. FBI Special Agent Steve Vogt stated in 2014 that neither Bishop's wallet nor passport have ever been found. It has also been speculated that Bishop may have had intelligence training in the 1960s which could have helped him evade detection in 1976.

Since 1976, there have been numerous claimed sightings of Bishop in various European countries, including Italy, Belgium, United Kingdom, Finland, the Netherlands, Germany, Greece, Spain, Sweden and Switzerland. The three most credible sightings noted by the United States Marshals Service are:

- In July 1978, a Swedish woman, who said she had collaborated with Bishop while on a business trip in Ethiopia, reported she had spotted him twice in a public park in Stockholm during a span of one week. She stated she was "absolutely certain" that the man was Bishop. She did not contact police at the time because she had not yet realized he was wanted for murder in the U.S.
- In January 1979, Bishop was reportedly seen by Roy Harrell, the State Department colleague who had last seen him before the murders, in a restroom in Sorrento, Italy. When Harrell greeted a bearded man eye-to-eye, asking him, "Hey, you're Brad Bishop, aren't you?", the man responded in a distinctly American accent, "Oh no" and fled.
- On September 19, 1994, on a Basel train platform, a neighbor who had known Bishop and his family in Bethesda was on vacation and reported that she had seen Bishop from a few feet away. The neighbor described Bishop as "well-groomed" and said that he was getting into a car.

== Possible current whereabouts and new information ==
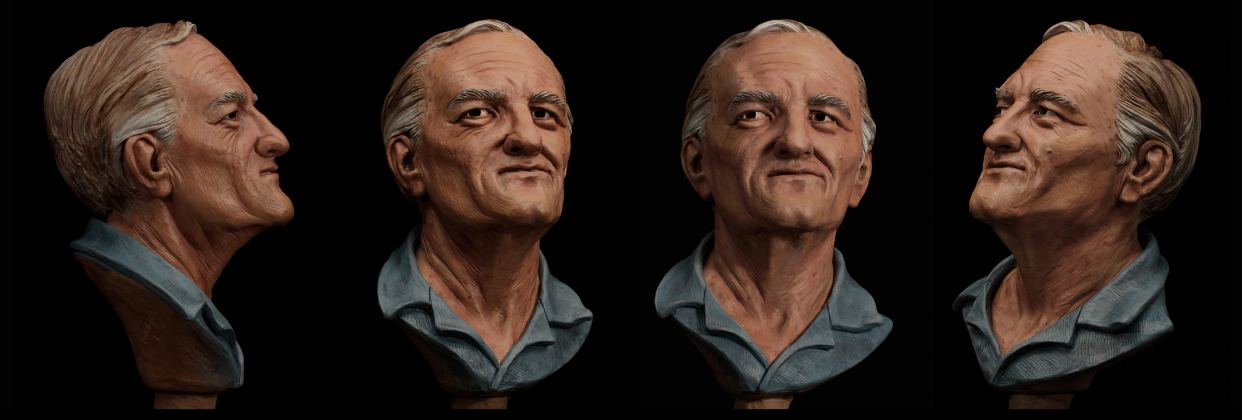
Different angles of age progression sculpture

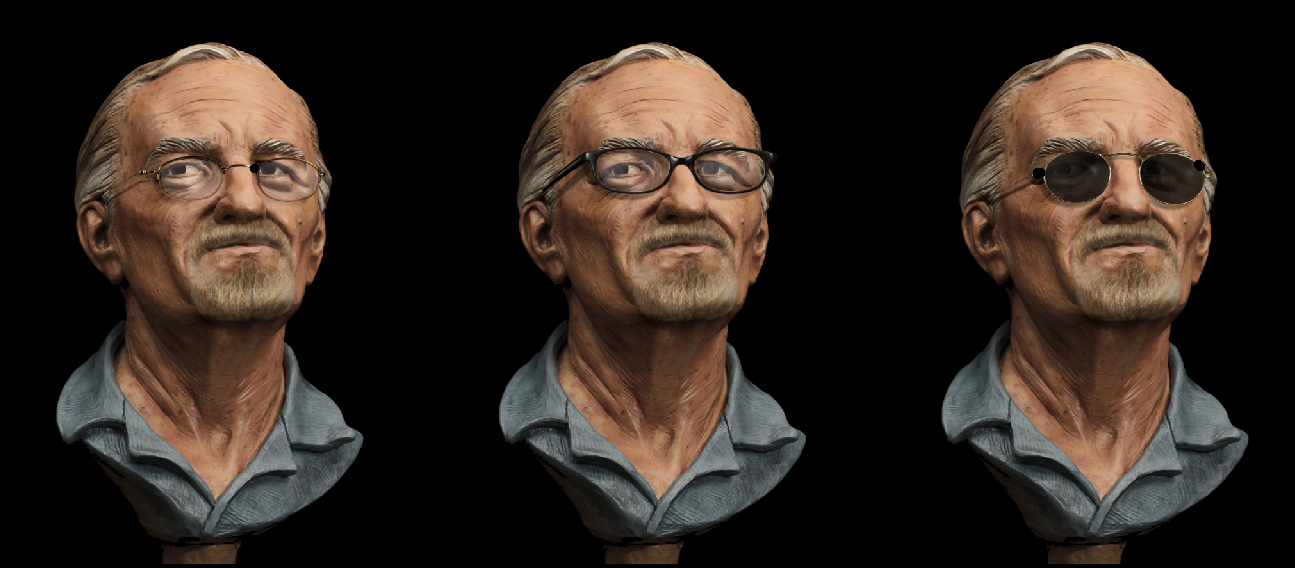
What Bishop might look like with facial hair and glasses

After the initial investigation, the Bishop case became the subject of articles in national publications like Reader's Digest and Time magazine at milestone anniversaries. It was followed on an ad hoc basis by The Washington Post, the Washington Star and The Washington Times as well as local television stations in the District of Columbia. The case was featured on television shows such as NBC's Unsolved Mysteries, ABC's Vanished and Fox's America's Most Wanted (AMW). Bishop was profiled on the AMW website thirty-three years to the day since his family's bodies were discovered, with a new age-enhanced bust of him with facial hair. A German TV show, Aktenzeichen XY… ungelöst, also featured the case in its 250th episode on November 6, 1992, to find possible evidence of Bishop living abroad.

In 2010, authorities believed Bishop was living in Switzerland, Italy or elsewhere in Europe, or possibly in California; he may have worked as a teacher or become involved in criminal activities. Authorities revealed in 2010 that before the murders, Bishop had been corresponding with federal prison inmate Albert Kenneth Bankston in the United States Penitentiary in Marion, Illinois, though it is unknown why or how. Bishop evidently had instructed Bankston to send letters to his State Department office address. AMW posted on its website the last letter from Bankston, which he had mailed to Bishop sixteen days after the murders unaware that Bishop was a fugitive and unable to receive mail at his office. Bankston died in 1983, ten years before law enforcement discovered his connection to Bishop.

In 2014, the FBI exhumed the body of an unidentified man resembling Bishop who had been killed by a car in 1981 while walking along an Alabama highway. A DNA test indicated the man was not Bishop. The FBI also used fingerprints to determine in 2011 that reports that Bishop had died in Hong Kong or France were false.

Authorities stated in 2014 that Bishop was probably living in plain sight in the U.S. and avoiding discovery by avoiding arrest. An arrest on any charge would enable law enforcement to fingerprint him, which in turn would link him with the murders. That same year, at the request of the FBI, forensic artist Karen Taylor created an age progression sculpture to suggest Bishop's projected appearance at about age 77. Using Taylor's sculpture, several alternative images were created by Lisa Sheppard to show the addition of facial hair and glasses.

In early April 2014, Washington, D.C., station WRC-TV launched a webpage to display multiple investigative reports and extensive information on the Bishop case. This included samples of Bishop's handwriting, fingerprints, dental records and previously unseen Bishop family home movies. On July 27, 2014, the search for Bishop was a featured story on The Hunt with John Walsh on CNN.

In March 2021, a woman who had been adopted came forward claiming she found out through a DNA testing service that Bishop was her biological father. The FBI confirmed that she was indeed his biological daughter.

== See also ==
- Crime in Maryland
- List of fugitives from justice who disappeared
- Watts family murders, murders committed by Christopher Watts in Colorado in 2018. He killed his wife (and unborn son) and two daughters via asphyxiation, confessed to the crimes days later, and was sentenced to life in prison.
- Robert William Fisher, Arizona man who killed his family in 2001 and was also on the FBI's Most Wanted list
- John List, New Jersey man who killed his family at home in 1971 and remained at large under a new identity for eighteen years
