= Juan Elias Garcia =

FBI Ten Most Wanted Fugitive
- Charges: Conspiracy to Commit Murder in Aid of Racketeering; Murder in Aid of Racketeering; Discharge of a Firearm During a Crime of Violence; Causing the Death of Another Through the Use of a Firearm
- Reward: $100,000

Description
- Born: January 12, 1993 (age 33); Santa Rosa de Lima, El Salvador
- Weight: 125 lb (57 kg)

Status
- Added: March 26, 2014
- Surrendered: March 27, 2014
- Number: 501
- Surrendered

Juan Elias Garcia (born January 12, 1993) is a Salvadoran-American man who was on the FBI Ten Most Wanted Fugitives list for killing his 19-year-old ex-girlfriend and letting fellow MS-13 gang members shoot her two-year-old son as he grabbed Garcia's leg for help. The murder occurred on February 4, 2010, while Garcia was added to the list on March 26, 2014. He surrendered a day after being on the list.

Garcia was convicted in March 2013 of the murders of Vanessa Argueta and Diego Torres and sentenced to life in prison.
