= Myloh Jaqory Mason =

American man (born 1990)

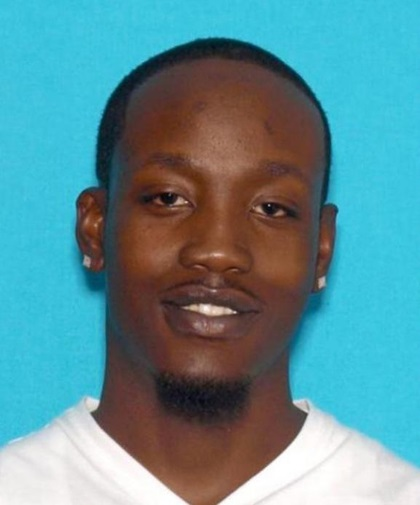

FBI Ten Most Wanted Fugitive
- Charges: Violent Robbery
- Alias: Myloh Mason; Myloh J. Mason; Myloh Jagorge Mason; Myloh Jagory Mason; Milo J. Mason; Milo Jagore Mason

Description
- Born: June 28, 1990 (age 35); Colorado
- Nationality: American
- Race: Black
- Gender: Male
- Height: 6 ft 2 in (1.88 m)
- Weight: 155 lb (70 kg; 11.1 st)

Status
- Added: December 17, 2015
- Caught: January 15, 2016
- Number: 505
- Captured

Myloh Jaqory Mason (born June 28, 1990) is an American man who was listed by the Federal Bureau of Investigation (FBI) of the United States within the FBI list of the ten most wanted persons for crimes alleged committed. Mason is described by the FBI as a violent felon.

== Crimes ==
Mason is listed as involved in the following crimes: two attempts of murder in the first degree, aggravated robbery; and attempted second degree kidnapping.

He is accused of multiple bank robberies in which he allegedly used violence, and two occasions criminally fired a gun, which happened during November 2015, within the state of Colorado.

Mason was arrested at a motel in Thornton, Colorado, on January 15, 2016.

In November 2016, Mason, along with Miguel David Sanders and Tyrone Javonne Richardson, was found guilty of attempted murder, assault, kidnapping, aggravated robbery, burglary, eluding, and aggravated motor vehicle theft. In December 2016, co-defendant Sanders was sentenced to 371 years in prison.

== Sources ==
- "Myloh Jaqory Mason". FBI. FBI Ten Most Wanted Fugitive. December 2015. Archived from the original on March 25, 2016.
- "FBI Task Force Arrests Top Ten Fugitive Myloh Mason". FBI. Press Release. Denver. January 15, 2016. "... less than one month after he was placed on the FBI's Top Ten Most Wanted list"
