= Shanika Minor =

American criminal (born 1991)

Shanika S. Minor
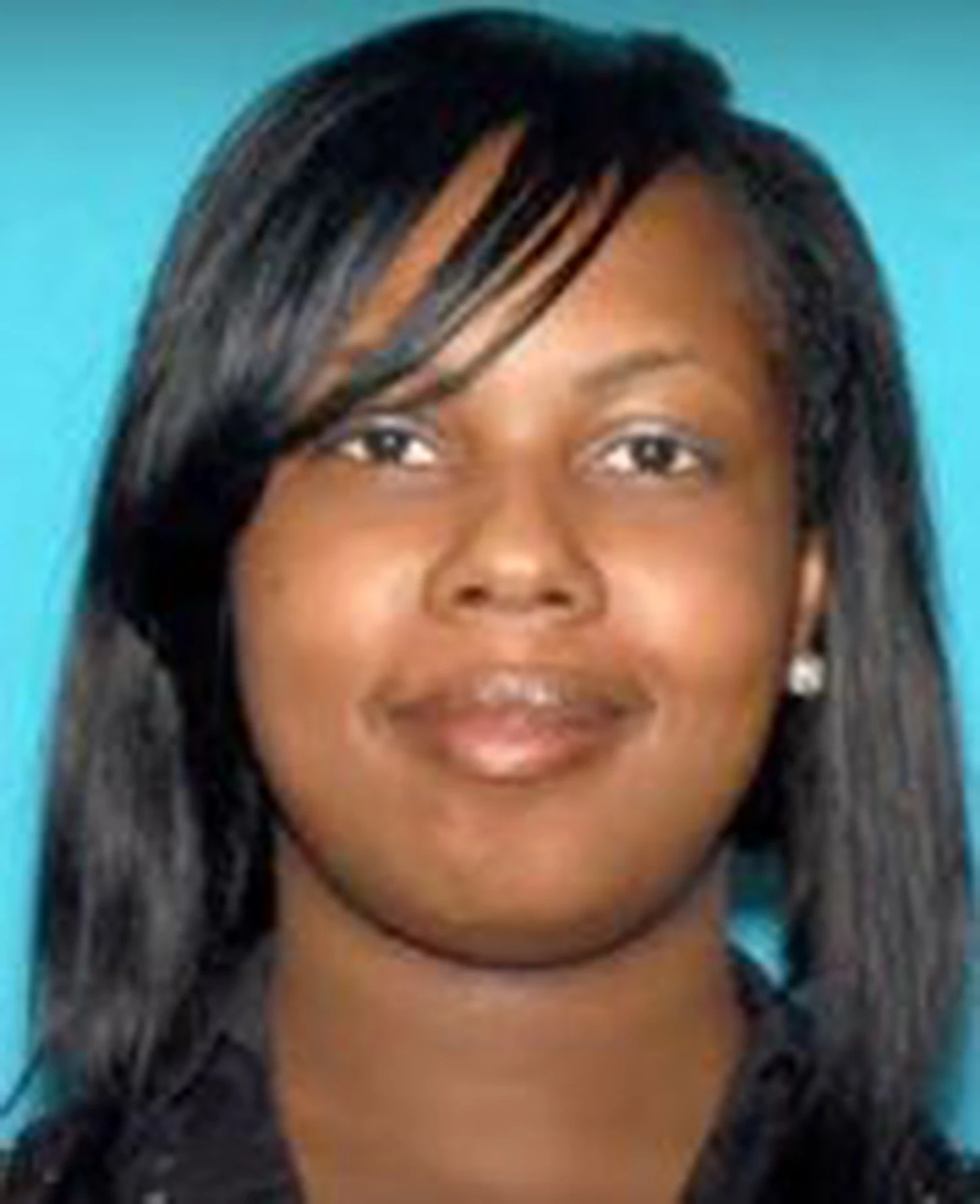

FBI Ten Most Wanted Fugitive
- Reward: $100,000

Description
- Born: November 29, 1991; Mississippi
- Nationality: American
- Race: African American
- Gender: Female
- Height: 5'6
- Weight: 165
- Occupation: Newspaper delivery

Status
- Convictions: First degree reckless homicide, and one count of first degree reckless homicide of an unborn child
- Penalty: 30 years in prison
- Added: June 28th, 2016
- Caught: July 1st, 2016
- Number: 509
- Captured

Shanika S. Minor (born November 29, 1991) is an American criminal who spent time on the FBI Ten Most Wanted Fugitives list after the shooting and killing of a pregnant woman. Minor was added to the FBI’s Ten Most Wanted Fugitives list on Tuesday, June 28, 2016, for her alleged involvement in first-degree intentional homicide, first-degree intentional homicide of an unborn child, and unlawful flight to avoid prosecution. Minor was the 10th female to be placed on the FBI’s Ten Most Wanted Fugitives list.

Minor was arrested in Fayetteville, North Carolina, on July 1, 2016. On August 24, 2017, she was sentenced to 30 years in prison.
