= Marlon Jones (gangster) =

Jamaican criminal, listed on the FBI's Ten Most Wanted Fugitives list

FBI Ten Most Wanted Fugitive

Description
- Born: 1970–1980; Jamaica
- Race: Black
- Gender: Male
- Height: 5 ft 10 in (1.78 m)
- Weight: 160–170 lb (73–77 kg)

Status
- Added: December 1, 2016
- Caught: December 2, 2016
- Number: 510
- Captured

Marlon Jones (born c. 1970–1980) is a Jamaican criminal who was added to the FBI's Ten Most Wanted Fugitives list in December 2016. He was captured within one day of being on the list.

He is allegedly connected to an October 15, 2016 shooting at a Los Angeles, California, house being used as a restaurant, that left four people dead and ten others wounded.

== Background and murders ==
Jones is part of a Jamaican gang with drug-related operations along the east coast, and had residence in New York at the time of the murders, though he was in the country illegally. It is unknown if Marlon Jones is his real identity, as he has a history of using fake names and birth dates.

Jones was added to the FBI's Top Ten Most Wanted list on December 1, 2016, following the murder of four people during a shootout at a West Adams, Los Angeles, residence that was being used as a restaurant called Dilly's Kitchen on October 15. Among those killed by Jones was Robert 'Rodigan' Davis, a fellow Jamaican gang leader. The murders are considered to be gang related.

On December 2, after receiving a tip, the Los Angeles police stopped a vehicle Jones was in on the 110 freeway, after which he fled the vehicle and was quickly apprehended.

Jones was charged with four counts of murder and pleaded not guilty.
