= Fugitive Felon Act =

United States federal law

- Long title: An Act making it unlawful for any person to flee from one State to another for the purpose of avoiding prosecution or the giving of testimony in certain cases
- Acronyms (colloquial): FFA
- Enacted by: the 73rd United States Congress
- Effective: May 18, 1934

Citations
- Public law: 73-234
- Statutes at Large: 48 Stat. 782

Codification
- Titles amended: 18 U.S.C.: Crimes and Criminal Procedure
- U.S.C. sections created: 18 U.S.C. § 1073

Legislative history
- Introduced in the Senate as S. 2253 by Royal S. Copeland (D–NY) on January 11, 1934; Passed the Senate on March 29, 1934; Passed the House on May 17, 1934; Signed into law by President Franklin D. Roosevelt on May 18, 1934

The Fugitive Felon Act, abbreviated FFA, is a United States federal law that criminalizes interstate flight in order to avoid prosecution or giving testimony in state felony proceedings, a crime termed unlawful flight.

The FFA was introduced to the Senate by Committee on Commerce chairman Royal S. Copeland in January 1934, and was signed into law in May of that year. The law was intended to hasten the process of apprehending and prosecuting members of armed gangs who could easily move across state lines; pre-existing procedures for interstate rendition were cumbersome and expensive and the lack of federal jurisdiction meant that state law enforcement could not cross interstate boundaries in pursuit of a criminal. Although the latter was addressed by the Act by virtue of empowering federal law enforcement to arrest fugitives charged with state crimes, the FFA's other intended goal of circumventing interstate rendition procedures has not been carried out and extradition of captured fugitives to the prosecuting state remains a state affair.

Although the FFA lists a punishment for unlawful flight, actual prosecutions under it are rare because the Act is intended as an instrument allowing federal authorities to arrest fugitives fleeing state charges.

== History ==
=== Background ===
The interwar period in the United States saw both an increase in crime and improvements in transportation that made apprehension of criminals more difficult. Interstate fugitives could only be returned to the prosecuting state through rendition, a lengthy and costly process rife with bureaucratic difficulties and subject to state discretion. On the other hand, a fugitive arrested for a federal crime could be quickly and easily returned to the relevant federal district via federal removal, as arresting officers had national jurisdiction. The lack of a right of law enforcement to cross state lines to pursue a criminal also presented crime-fighting difficulties that could be solved by allowing federal authorities to apprehend fugitives. The crimes the Fugitive Felon Act was meant to address were primarily those perpetuated by armed groups like the Dillinger Gang.

=== In Congress ===
The bill that would become the Fugitive Felon Act was introduced to the Senate by Royal S. Copeland, chair of the Committee on Commerce, on January 11, 1934, as part of a series of thirteen bills to strengthen crime-fighting. The bill, then known as S. 2253, was passed by the Senate on March 29, 1934.

S. 2253 was passed by the House on May 17, 1934. The bill was signed into law by Franklin D. Roosevelt a day later. In its 1934 formulation, the Act read as follows:

Be it enacted, etc., That it shall be unlawful for any person to move or travel in interstate commerce from any state, territory or possession of the United States, or the District of Columbia, with intent either (1) to avoid prosecution for murder, kidnaping, burglary, robbery, mayhem, rape, assault with a dangerous weapon, or extortion accompanied by threats of violence, or attempt to commit any of the foregoing, under the laws of the place from which he flees, or (2) to avoid giving testimony in any criminal proceedings in which a felony is charged. Any person who violates the provisions of this act shall, upon conviction thereof, be punished by a fine of not more than $5,000 or by imprisonment for not longer than 5 years, or by both such fine and imprisonment. Violations of this act may be prosecuted only in the Federal judicial district in which the original crime to have been committed.

On October 4, 1961, President John F. Kennedy approved an amendment of the bill that expanded its coverage to include fugitives fleeing prosecution for any crime designated as a felony in the original jurisdiction. The amendment faced little opposition within the House compared to other crime-related legislation passed around the same time. The amendment resulted in what FBI Director J. Edgar Hoover called an "appreciable increase" in apprehended fugitives: in the two years following the amendment the number of located fugitives increased from 1,418 to 2,514.

Although the Fugitive Felon Act de jure applies to all state felonies, including parental kidnapping, the United States Department of Justice de facto set an exception for such cases until the Parental Kidnapping Prevention Act was passed in 1980. The PKPA explicitly stated that the Fugitive Felon Act applied to parental kidnapping cases.

=== In the courts ===
In 1957, the power of the Act was severely restrained when the eastern division of the Northern District of Illinois ruled in United States v. Rappaport that the law only applied to fugitives fleeing a pending prosecution. However, concerns about the Act's power being curtailed were alleviated by two later rulings: both the Second Circuit in United States v. Bando (1957) and the District of Minnesota in United States v. Lupino (1958) ruled that the Act also applied to people fleeing potential prosecution.

The FFA's constitutionality has been challenged several times since its passage, with violations of the Eighth Amendment (claiming that the maximum penalty set out by the Act constituted cruel and unusual punishment), Tenth Amendment (claiming that the law interfered with law enforcement and extradition powers reserved to the states), and Due Process Clause (claiming that the FFA was too ambiguous for an accused to understand) being alleged before federal courts. All such arguments have been dismissed.

== Application and enforcement ==
Under its current wording, the Fugitive Felon Act punishes unlawful flight with a fine and/or a prison sentence of no more than five years. However, sentences under the Act are extremely rare and charges under it are usually dismissed. Attorney General Robert F. Kennedy in 1962 reported that less than 0.005 percent of fugitives arrested under the statute were also prosecuted under it. This is because the main purpose of the law is to facilitate the apprehension of state fugitives and to avoid the need for interstate extradition. The rare cases where prosecution for unlawful flight is sought usually involve multiple federal charges or unusual circumstances, and require written approval from the Attorney General, Deputy Attorney General, Associate Attorney General, or Assistant Attorney General to be pursued.

State or local authorities seeking federal assistance in apprehending a fugitive who has fled the state can file charges alleging unlawful flight on the fugitive's part. If the charges are approved a warrant is issued, allowing for federal assistance. Although the Act was intended to allow national authorities to use federal removal to quickly send arrested fugitives to the prosecuting state, rendition remains mostly in the hands of the states, with the FFA being a mechanism for federal authorities to conduct arrests.

In 1995, the Federal Rules of Criminal Procedure were amended to facilitate extradition by forgoing the requirement to present a defendant arrested on a warrant under the act to a judge as long as they were presented to a state or local officer and the US attorney moves promptly to dismiss the complaint.

== See also ==
- FBI Ten Most Wanted Fugitives, the majority of whom have been charged with unlawful flight to avoid prosecution.
- Federal Kidnapping Act, similar law allowing for federal assistance in pursuing interstate criminals.

== References and sources ==
=== General sources ===
- "The Fugitive Felon Act: Its Function and Purpose". Washington University Law Quarterly. 1964 (3): 355–367. January 1964.
- Bare, Samuel L. III (Spring 1960). "Federal Assistance In The Enforcement Of State Criminal Law". Washington and Lee Law Review. 17 (1): 161–166.
