= Neuvonen =

Neuvonen is a Finnish and Estonian surname. It may refer to:

- Aarni Neuvonen, Estonian perpetrator of employment fraud
- Anssi Neuvonen, Finnish songwriter, musician and producer, frontman of indie rock band NEØV
- Kiti Neuvonen, member of Finnish band Agit-Prop
