= List of fugitives from justice who disappeared =

This is a list of fugitives from justice, notable people who disappeared or evaded capture while being sought by law enforcement agencies in connection with a crime, and who are currently sought or were sought for the duration of their presumed natural lifetime. For espionage cases, only persons motivated by pecuniary gain are included.

Listing here does not imply guilt and may include persons who are or were wanted only for questioning.

== Pre-19th century ==
Date of disappearance	Person(s)	Image	Age (at disappearance)	Country	Circumstances
834	Muhammad ibn al-Qasim (Sahib al-Talaqan)		unknown	Abbasids	Ibn Qasim was an Alid Imam who led a rebellion that took place in the city of Taloqan. Ibn Qasim was arrested by the authorities and imprisoned in Baghdad, but later escaped, and was never heard from again.
1077	Afshin Bey		60–61	Seljuk Empire	Afshin Bey was a Khorasani Turkmen commander of the Seljuk Empire who, after fleeing to Anatolia in 1067 after being on the run for committing a murder, disappeared again in 1077 after going to Aleppo on a mission to crush rebellions, and was never seen again.
3 November 1324	Alice Kyteler		60–61	Lordship of Ireland	Kyteler was awaiting trial for charges of heresy, witchcraft, sorcery, etc. stemming from the 1324 death of her fourth husband, John Poer, when she fled, allegedly to England. A maidservant who did not escape, Petronilla de Meath, was convicted, tortured and burned at the stake.
June 1696	Henry Every (sometimes spelled 'Avery')		37	England	Every, an English pirate, vanished after perpetrating one of the most profitable pirate raids in history. Despite a worldwide manhunt and an enormous bounty on his head, Every was never heard from again. A manhunt for Every lasted for at least a decade. There were several unconfirmed sightings of him and contradictory reports of his death during the 18th century. Most of them are considered unreliable, moreover, and his fate is unknown.

== 19th century ==
Date of disappearance	Person(s)	Image	Age (at disappearance)	Country	Circumstances
September 1800	Jack York		unknown	(United Kingdom) Canada	York was a Canadian slave from Ontario who was charged with raping a woman named Ruth Tufflemier and was arrested in August 1800. The charge was later changed to burglary, and the trial took place on 12 September 1800. York was convicted and sentenced to death, but later escaped and was never seen again.
1857	Nana Saheb Peshwa II		34	British India	Leader of the Indian Rebellion of 1857, who was allegedly responsible for both the Satichaura Ghat massacre and the Bibighar massacre. Nana Saheb escaped after the British retook the city of Kanpur. Multiple conflicting accounts exist of his further life and death, with some stating that he died of malaria in September 1857 and others claiming that he fled to Nepal and may have died in 1859. Still other accounts record that Nana Saheb escaped and place his date of death as late as 1906.
1862	Jean Baptiste		49	United States	Jean Baptiste, a grave robber in Utah in the 1860s, was arrested in 1862 for stealing items from graves. He was exiled to Fremont Island in the Great Salt Lake, but disappeared shortly after his arrival. His fate remains unknown.
15 July 1864	Rufus Henry Ingram		30	United States	Bushwhacker led Captain Ingram's Partisan Rangers, a gang of Confederate raiders who robbed banks and stagecoaches across California. On 15 July 1864, Ingram and his followers attempted to rob a mine, but were intercepted by police. Ingram managed to escape, fleeing into Missouri, never to be seen again.
22 November 1873	William J. Sharkey		26–27	United States	Sharkey was a convicted murderer and minor New York City Democratic politician who earned national notoriety for escaping from The Tombs disguised as a woman in 1873. Sharkey reportedly fled to Cuba, which had no extradition treaty with the United States. His ultimate fate is unknown.
1873	Bloody Benders		Various	United States	Family of serial killers who killed at least 11 people in Labette County, Kansas from 1871 to 1873. Shortly before the discovery of their crimes, they fled south and were never captured. Over the years, several people were arrested because police thought they might be a member of the Bender family, but none were definitely confirmed.
1875	Moses Ehrich		unknown	United States	Ehrich was an American businessman and underworld figure known as "'Old Unger" who served as a fence to burglars, thieves and shoplifters from his Eldridge Street store throughout the mid-to-late 19th century. He was indicted four or five times on charges of receiving stolen goods during the administration of A. Oakey Hall, but always escaped conviction. Ehrich disappeared from New York City in 1875, escaped to Canada, and was never seen again.
1876	Agustus "Gus" Heffron		unknown	United States	Heffron was an American fugitive and a sidekick of fellow American fugitive Davy Crockett (a younger relative of famed American frontiersman Davy Crockett). Heffron was shot and sent to jail in New Mexico, but later escaped on October 31, 1876, and fled for the Colorado mountains and was never seen again.
1878	Procopio		37	United States	Mexican desperado alleged to have committed about a dozen murders in California, but was convicted only of cattle theft and banditry. He escaped prison in 1877, but differing accounts exist of his fate.
Summer of 1880	Hoodoo Brown		unknown	United States	Leader of the Dodge City Gang, a group of gamblers and gunfighters who ruled over the city of Las Vegas, New Mexico between 1879 and 1880, in which they committed a variety of crimes including robberies, murders and thefts. In the summer of 1880, local citizens formed a vigilante group and drove Brown out of the state, with his ultimate fate left unclear.
1881	Michael O'Rourke		19–20	United States	O'Rourke, an American fugitive and gambler from Arizona who was imprisoned, later escaped from jail on 18 April 1881.
1885	Mysterious Dave Mather		34	United States	"Mysterious" Dave Mather was a lawman who served in Kansas and the New Mexico Territory who was indicted for the murder of a man in Dodge City, which he committed with his brother. The pair posted bail before they could be tried, and Mather never resurfaced afterwards.
19 December 1885	E. J. Dawne		41	United States	Dawne was an American preacher and judge for United States territorial court of Alaska who fled the country amidst charges of forgery and embezzlement. His last confirmed whereabouts were at a boarding house in Victoria, Canada, but he managed to flee and his definitive fate is unknown.
1887	Dan Bogan		27	United States	Gunfighter and outlaw responsible for several murders in the Texas Panhandle, who was convicted and sentenced to death for murdering a Texas Ranger in Wyoming in 1887. He escaped from jail and headed south, but authorities lost track of him, leaving his ultimate fate unclear.
1888	Jack The Ripper		unknown	United Kingdom of Great Britain and Ireland	Jack the Ripper was an unidentified serial killer who was active in and around the impoverished Whitechapel district of London, England, in 1888. He is thought to have murdered at least 5 victims and was never caught despite extensive police investigations.
26 May 1888	Boston Corbett		56	United States	Boston Corbett, a former military sergeant who killed John Wilkes Booth (who assassinated President Abraham Lincoln), was committed to a mental asylum after he was caught chasing people while armed with a gun, with a judge ruling he was legally insane. Corbett escaped from the asylum on 26 May 1888, and was never found.
2 November 1889	Apache Kid		unknown	United States	Haskay-bay-nay-ntayl, better known as the Apache Kid, was an army scout and later a renegade active in the U.S. states of Arizona and New Mexico who escaped from jail on 2 November 1889, and was said to have killed many people during that time. He was eventually caught and sent to jail. He was later released and became a wanted fugitive again and was never recaptured.
after 1896	Francis Hermans		39–40	United States	Hermans, who was from England and later moved to the United States' Salt Lake City, Utah, was a pastor who was a known murderer and was also accused of murdering multiple people which included his own family members. Hermann had fled town in 1896 and was never seen again.

== 1900–1924 ==
Date of disappearance	Person(s)	Image	Age (at disappearance)	Country	Circumstances
1903	Sam Carey		unknown	United States	Carey was a member of the Hole-in-the-Wall Gang, a group of loosely-knit outlaws who operated in Johnson County, Wyoming, during the 1880s and 1890s. He was the singular member of the gang not known to have been apprehended, disappearing from history circa 1903.
28 April 1908	Belle Gunness		48	United States	Gunness, who was a Norwegian-American serial killer, vanished on 28 April 1908 after a house fire (suspected arson) and withdrawing huge amounts of money from her bank accounts. Although the remains of a headless woman found after the fire were suspected to be those of Belle Gunness, this remains unverified and debated.
7 November 1908	Robert Leroy Parker (alias Butch Cassidy)		42	United States	After the two Hole-in-the-Wall Gang outlaws escaped from jail, "Wanted dead or alive" posters were posted throughout the country, with rewards of as much as $30,000 for information leading to their capture or deaths. They were supposedly killed in a shootout with Bolivian police around 7–8 November, although authorities were unable to positively identify the bodies.
7 November 1908	Harry Alonzo Longabaugh (alias The Sundance Kid)		40–41	United States	After the two Hole-in-the-Wall Gang outlaws escaped from jail, "Wanted dead or alive" posters were posted throughout the country, with rewards of as much as $30,000 for information leading to their capture or deaths. They were supposedly killed in a shootout with Bolivian police around 7–8 November, although authorities were unable to positively identify the bodies.
31 July 1909	Etta Place		30–31	United States	Etta Place was a companion of the American outlaws Robert LeRoy Parker, alias Butch Cassidy, and Harry Alonzo Longabaugh, alias Sundance Kid. The three were members of the outlaw gang known as Butch Cassidy's Wild Bunch. Both her origin and her fate remain unknown.
October 1910	Sylvestro "Pedro" Morales		unknown	United States	Mexican bandit who was imprisoned for the 1889 murder of a rancher. He was later released for good behavior in 1909, whereupon he murdered a gang member who had betrayed him. Despite extensive searches by authorities, he was never recaptured.
1912	Andrés O'Donnell		26–28	Peru	Between 1903 and 1911, O'Donnell was an agent of the Peruvian Amazon Company who managed the Entre Ríos station near the upper Cahuinari River. Multiple witness testimonies collected by Benjamin Saldaña Rocca, Roger Casement and judge Carlos A. Valcárcel implicate O'Donnell in the Putumayo genocide. Roger Casement attempted to have O'Donnell arrested in Barbados when he was discovered living free at Bridgetown, but he was released on a legal technicality. Shortly after he escaped and disappeared.
April 1914	Victor Macedo		unknown	Peru	Macedo was the general manager of the Peruvian Amazon Company's agency at La Chorrera during the Putumayo genocide. There were 215 arrest warrants issued against employees of La Chorrera in June 1911, and an arrest warrant was issued for Macedo in July of that same year. A Prefect of Lima reported that Macedo was arrested, however according to judge Rómulo Paredes, this same Prefect was responsible for releasing Macedo. He evaded authorities and was never recaptured.
1914	Peter Madden		unknown	United States	Madden was an American thief, gang leader, and labor racketeer who in June 1914 was arrested for his suspected involvement, with his partner John Ryan, in a street mugging. On 25 June they were sent to The Tombs, charged with stealing the wallet of William Beard in Madison Square. On 10 September, he and Ryan were handcuffed together and sent to the nearby Criminal Courts Building. Two deputy sheriffs then noticed that Madden was missing. Madden was never seen again, and what became of him is unknown.
May 1915	Armando Normand		34–35	Bolivia	Normand was a Peruvian-Bolivian accountant, enslaver, and killer known for his role in the Putumayo genocide. Between 1904 and 1910 Normand was employed by the Peruvian Amazon Company at the Matanzas rubber station, committing some of the most infamous crimes that were reported during the genocide, including multiple instances of immolations, flagellations, rapes, and killings. He was later arrested around the end of 1912, after he was dismissed from the company. He later escaped from prison and apparently escaped to Brazil without a trace.
May 1915	Aurelio Rodríguez		unknown	Peru	Aurelio and his brother Arístides Rodríguez were managers of the Peruvian Amazon Company during its perpetration of the Putumayo genocide. Arístides drowned shortly after his retirement in 1909, Aurelio was arrested in 1911 for his connection to the atrocities that occurred during his management. Roger Casement wrote that "wholesale murder and torture endured up to the end of Aurelio Rodriguez's service." The judge that investigated the Putumayo atrocities emphasized that some of the rubber stations, notably that of the Rodríguez brothers, had so many human remains on site that the areas resembled battlefields. Depositions collected by the judge implicated Aurelio and his brother with several massacres of indigenous people in the Putumayo River basin, as well as innumerable flagellations and instances of murder, which were personally carried out by Aurelio or his brother. The general manager of the Peruvian Amazon Company paid a £2,000 bond for Aurelio's release from prison in 1911. Prior to a verdict in his trial, Aurelio escaped from prison at Iquitos with Armando Normand in May 1915.
4 October 1916	Béla Kiss		39	Austria-Hungary	Kiss was a Hungarian serial killer and murderer of 24 people before he was drafted in the Austro-Hungarian Army in the First World War. Upon the discovery of his crimes, he was traced to a Serbian hospital but escaped a few days before investigators arrived. Although there were several reported sightings of the killer (notably in New York City in 1932), his true fate remains a mystery.
3 September 1919	William Kunnecke		68–69	United States	Kunnecke, a German-American murderer convicted of murdering farmhand Andrew Demler in South Dakota and suspected of two previous killings in Idaho, was sentenced to life imprisonment at the South Dakota State Penitentiary for Demler's murder, though he escaped in 1919 and was never seen again.
27 October 1919	Axeman of New Orleans		unknown	United States	The Axeman of New Orleans was an unidentified American serial killer who was active in and around New Orleans, Louisiana, between May 1918 and October 1919. As the killer's epithet implies, the victims usually were attacked with an axe, which often belonged to the victims themselves. The attacker was never identified, and the murders remain unsolved.
2 February 1922	Edward F. Sands		27	United States	Sands was a suspect in the murder of Hollywood director William Desmond Taylor on 1 February 1922. He disappeared shortly after that, and was never seen again.

== 1925–1949 ==
Date of disappearance	Person(s)	Image	Age (at disappearance)	Country	Circumstances
after April 1925	David Brown		29–30	United States	Brown, a left-handed pitcher in Negro league baseball, disappeared in 1925 before he could be questioned about a man's murder.
April 1931	Raymond "Craneneck" Nugent		35–36	United States	Egan's Rats Gang member Raymond "Craneneck" Nugent who was a killer, bank robber, and associate of Fred "Killer" Burke, disappeared in April 1931. No trace of him was ever found.
16 December 1937	Theodore Cole		24	United States	Cole and Roe, both convicted bank robbers in Oklahoma, were judged to be escape risks, and were both eventually transferred to Alcatraz in 1936. They escaped from Alcatraz on 16 December 1937, and although officials were quick to conclude they died in the attempt, their remains were never found and their fate remains unclear.
16 December 1937	Ralph Roe		31	United States	Cole and Roe, both convicted bank robbers in Oklahoma, were judged to be escape risks, and were both eventually transferred to Alcatraz in 1936. They escaped from Alcatraz on 16 December 1937, and although officials were quick to conclude they died in the attempt, their remains were never found and their fate remains unclear.
8 August 1940	Eleanor Jarman		39	United States	In 1933, Jarman and two men murdered the owner of a Chicago clothing store during a robbery. Jarman was jailed and served seven years of her 199-year sentence, but escaped in 1940. She eluded police while making intermittent contact with her family and son. She is believed to be buried under an alias.
1944	Mieczysław Kosmowski		30–31	Poland	Kosmowski, a Polish Nazi collaborator, Gestapo agent and war criminal was last seen in 1944 in Bydgoszcz, when he evacuated with the German Army. In 1955, he was accused of denouncing several Poles to the Germans and a wanted poster was issued for him in 1957, and at the request of the court a warrant was issued, which was valid from 1957 until 2009.
1945	Szilveszter Matuska		52–53	Hungary	Matuska was a convicted Hungarian mass murderer. He had made two successful and at least two unsuccessful attempts to derail passenger trains in three European countries. His death sentence was commuted to life imprisonment under an extradition agreement. Matuska escaped from jail in Vác in 1945 and his ultimate fate is unknown.
1945	Petar Brzica		28	Independent State of Croatia	An Ustaše guard at the Jasenovac Concentration Camp, Petar Brzica was involved in a "contest" to kill the most Serbian prisoners in one night. Brzica won the "contest", bragging of murdering up to 1,360 people. Brzica's post-war fate remains unknown, though reports of him living as an elderly man in Croatia surfaced in 2009.
April 1945	Karl Künstler		44	Germany	SS-Obersturmbannführer and commandant of the Flossenbürg concentration camp, under whose leadership executions of Polish and Soviet citizens skyrocketed. He was later demoted because of his alcohol abuse, and was presumably killed during the Battle of Nuremberg in April 1945.
1 May 1945	Heinrich Müller		45	Germany	Müller, a prominent Nazi and Commanding Officer of the entire Gestapo apparatus, was last seen in the Führerbunker on the evening of 1 May 1945. While there he had stated that his intention was to avoid being taken into custody by the Soviet forces advancing on Berlin. Müller is the most senior Nazi official whose fate is unknown.
May 1945	Richard Kunze		73	Germany	Politician of the German Social Party, a precursor to the Nazi Party, known for his anti-Semitic rhetoric and policies, who served in the Reichstag until its dissolution in 1945. Kunze was himself arrested following the Battle of Berlin, but later went missing in May 1945, never to be seen again.
Spring of 1945	Ivan the Terrible		unknown	Germany	A notorious guard at the Treblinka extermination camp, known as "Ivan the Terrible," was accused of extreme cruelty to prisoners at the camp. His true identity and fate remain unknown.
late 1945	Lorenz Hackenholt		31	Germany	Schutzstaffel member who built and operated the gas chambers at the Belzec extermination camp in Poland, personally carrying out the executions of numerous people. Hackenholt disappeared in late 1945, and was initially thought to have been killed by partisans in Italy. However, this was not conclusively proven, and Hackenholt has not been seen since.
1945	Stepan Fedak		44	Ukraine	Fedak was a Ukrainian fascist who had previously attempted to assassinate Poland's Chief of State, Marshal Józef Piłsudski. Fedak later served as a lieutenant in the Nazi SS Galicia division between 1943 and 1945. He disappeared without a trace in Berlin toward the end of World War II.
10 February 1947	Frederick J. Tenuto		32	United States	Tenuto, also known as "Angel of Death," was a New York City mobster and criminal who escaped from the Philadelphia County Prison in a jailbreak on 10 February 1947. He was on the FBI Ten Most Wanted Fugitives list as number 14 for over a decade, the longest on record at the time. His ultimate fate is unknown.

== 1950s ==
Date of disappearance	Person(s)	Age (at disappearance)	Country	Circumstances
1955	John Patrick Hannan	21–22	Ireland	John Patrick Hannan was an Irish prisoner who escaped from HM Prison The Verne and has not been seen since. He holds the record for the longest escape from custody without being caught.

== 1960s ==
Date of disappearance	Person(s)	Image	Age (at disappearance)	Country	Circumstances
23 September 1960	James Squillante		41	United States	Squillante, a caporegime in the Gambino crime family, disappeared after being indicted on extortion charges. He is believed to have been murdered in a car crusher and his body disposed of in a crushed automobile that was subsequently melted down in an open hearth furnace. No physical evidence has ever been found to substantiate this claim and no one was ever charged in connection with the disappearance.
11/12 June 1962	Frank Morris		35	United States	Morris and brothers Clarence and John Anglin escaped from Alcatraz prison and disappeared. After extensive investigation, authorities presumed that they drowned in attempting to escape from the island prison, but no bodies were ever recovered. The U.S. Marshal Service has stated that the investigation will remain open on each individual man until proof of death has been established or the date of the fugitive's 100th birthday, whichever comes first.
11/12 June 1962	Clarence Anglin		31	United States	Morris and brothers Clarence and John Anglin escaped from Alcatraz prison and disappeared. After extensive investigation, authorities presumed that they drowned in attempting to escape from the island prison, but no bodies were ever recovered. The U.S. Marshal Service has stated that the investigation will remain open on each individual man until proof of death has been established or the date of the fugitive's 100th birthday, whichever comes first.
11/12 June 1962	John Anglin		32	United States	Morris and brothers Clarence and John Anglin escaped from Alcatraz prison and disappeared. After extensive investigation, authorities presumed that they drowned in attempting to escape from the island prison, but no bodies were ever recovered. The U.S. Marshal Service has stated that the investigation will remain open on each individual man until proof of death has been established or the date of the fugitive's 100th birthday, whichever comes first.
23 June 1965	Charles Rogers		43	United States	Rogers, a reclusive unemployed seismologist in Houston, Texas, has remained at large since the "Icebox Murders" of his parents on 23 June leading to a warrant for his detention as a material witness. He was declared legally dead in 1975.
27 November 1968	Siegfried Rautenberg		26	West Germany	Rautenberg was indicted for the October 1968 murder of prostitute Monika Schwiegerhausen in Hamburg, and was also sought as a suspect in the murders of two other prostitutes dating back to May of that year. He fled Germany and joined the Spanish Legion, which refused to extradite him until his supposed death in 1975 during a failed attempt to escape from the Spanish Sahara. His body was never recovered, and he officially remains a fugitive.
31 October 1969	Bible John		unknown	United Kingdom	Bible John is an unidentified serial killer who is believed to have murdered three young women in Glasgow, Scotland, between 1968 and 1969. The perpetrator has never been identified and the case remains unsolved and one of the most extensive manhunts in Scottish criminal history.
December 1969	Sharon Kinne		30	Mexico	Kinne (known as 'La Pistolera') was an American woman convicted of homicide in Mexico and was awaiting trial for the murder of her husband James Kinne when she escaped from Iztapalapa prison on 7 December 1969. Despite extensive manhunts in Mexico and the United States, her whereabouts were unknown until 2025, when it was announced that she had moved to Taber, Alberta, Canada in 1973 and worked as a motel owner and real estate agent under the name of Diedra Glabus (later Ell). She died in 2022.

== 1970s ==
Date of disappearance	Person(s)	Image	Age (at disappearance)	Country	Circumstances
2 July 1970	Elmer Crawford		40–41	Australia	The Crawford family murder was the 1970 killing of pregnant mother Therese and her three children: Kathryn, James and Karen. The family car was located at the bottom of a cliff at Loch Ard Gorge in Port Campbell, Victoria, Australia on 2 July 1970. The bodies of Therese and her children were still inside. A July 1971 coroner's inquest found that Elmer Crawford murdered his wife and three children in their Cardinal Road, Glenroy home. Crawford had constructed an electrocution device, using a 15-metre (49 ft) length of electrical lead and alligator clips. He attached the alligator clips to his wife's ears while she slept and electrocuted her. He then beat his children to death, presumably using a hammer, then loaded their bodies into the family's FE Holden vehicle. He then drove them 200 kilometres (120 mi) to Port Campbell where he connected a hose from the exhaust to the driver's side window, before pushing the car containing the bodies over the cliff edge in an effort to make the crime look like murder-suicide. Crawford disappeared after and has not been seen since.
24 August 1970	Thomas Brooks III		22	United States	Brooks, who was serving a 20-year sentence for his role in a 1968 murder, walked away from a prison work crew in Isle of Wight County, Virginia and was never recaptured.
30 August 1970	Leo Burt		22	United States	Burt allegedly participated in the Sterling Hall bombing on the University of Wisconsin–Madison campus on 24 August 1970, and on 2 September was indicted federally in Madison, Wisconsin. He disappeared in 1970 and has not been seen since.
1971	Anthony Cox		35–36	United States	Cox, an American film producer and second husband of Yoko Ono, kidnapped their daughter Kyoko after losing a custody battle, hiding out with the help of The Living Word Fellowship. He later left the cult and has allowed their daughter to be in close contact with her mother, but their exact whereabouts remain unknown.
24 November 1971	D. B. Cooper		unknown	United States	D.B. Cooper is the media's name for an unknown man who hijacked Northwest Orient Airline Flight 305 on Thanksgiving Eve 1971. Cooper hijacked the plane while it was en route to Seattle and made demands of $200,000 and parachutes. After landing in Seattle and releasing the passengers the plane took off again for Mexico City, and somewhere between Seattle and Reno Cooper jumped out of the plane with the money and parachutes. He has never been found. In 2016, the FBI redirected the resources allocated to the Cooper case towards other investigative priorities and requested anyone with a substantial lead to contact their local FBI Field Office.
1972	Henri Young		60–61	United States	Young was a convicted bank robber and murderer, who while serving one of a series of prison terms, attempted a 1939 escape from Alcatraz Federal Penitentiary with four other inmates. During the escape attempt two inmates were shot, and one died of his wounds. All surviving were quickly recaptured. Two, Young and Rufus McCain, received sentences of solitary confinement and served them at Alcatraz for a period of three years (until autumn of 1942). He was released from Washington State Penitentiary in 1972, and then jumped parole and, according to Washington State authorities, his whereabouts are unknown.
26 June 1973	Frank Matthews		29	United States	Matthews was a major heroin and cocaine trafficker who operated throughout the eastern seaboard during the late 1960s and early 1970s. In 1973, the Drug Enforcement Administration arrested Matthews in Las Vegas, but he paid bail then disappeared. Matthews allegedly took $15–20 million with him and fled the country, leaving behind his common-law wife, their three sons, and their Staten Island mansion. He was never known to be seen again.
7 December 1973	Lester Eubanks		30	United States	Eubanks was convicted of rape and murder. His death sentence was commuted to life imprisonment. He escaped while on a temporary furlough at a shopping mall.
8 November 1974	Lord Lucan		39	United Kingdom	Lucan went missing after the murder in London of his children's nanny, Sandra Rivett, for which he was the prime suspect. It was speculated that the murder in the family home in Belgravia was a case of mistaken identity, and that Lucan had intended to kill his wife. He was declared legally deceased in October 1999, and a death certificate was issued in 2016, thereby making his son George the 8th Earl of Lucan.
1976	Frank Blackhorse		28–29	United States	Blackhorse (believed to be born Francis or Frank DeLuca, and also known under several aliases besides Blackhorse) was a member of the American Indian Movement and was charged with shooting an FBI agent during the Wounded Knee incident in 1973, although no conclusive evidence was presented. Blackhorse is believed to have disappeared in 1976.
16 February 1976	Bum Farto		56	United States	Bum Farto was the fire chief of Key West, Florida, who was arrested during a sting operation called Operation Conch after selling cocaine and marijuana to an undercover police officer. He was convicted in February 1976 but, prior to sentencing, rented a car and drove north before disappearing. Where he fled to became the subject of much speculation in Key West, and shirts with the slogan "Where is Bum Farto?" became popular in local shops. In 1980, reports emerged that Farto was seen renewing his passport at the US embassy in Costa Rica, and he was recognized by six residents of Golfito. Farto's attorney, Manny James, reportedly wore a shirt with the slogan "Bum is Alive and Well in Spain". Farto was legally declared dead in absentia in 1986 so that his wife could pursue insurance claims.
18 March 1976	Bradford Bishop		39	United States	Bishop disappeared 2 March from Bethesda, Maryland, shortly after allegedly murdering his wife, mother, and children. On 18 March, the Bishop family car was found abandoned at an isolated campground in Elkmont, Tennessee. On 10 April 2014, the FBI named him the 502nd fugitive to be placed on its List of 10 Most Wanted Fugitives.
21 May 1979	William Morales		29	United States	Morales was an American bomb maker for Fuerzas Armadas de Liberación Nacional Puertorriqueña who was convicted in February 1979 for possession of explosives, and possession and transportation of explosives and a shotgun. He escaped from Bellevue Hospital in May 1979 and subsequently fled to Mexico, where he was held by the authorities before he emigrated to Cuba in 1988. He is currently on the FBI Most Wanted domestic terrorists list with a reward of $100,000 for information leading to his arrest.

== 1980s ==
Date of disappearance	Person(s)	Image	Age (at disappearance)	Country	Circumstances
30 June 1980	Luiz Baú		41	Brazil	Baú, a schizophrenic pedophile imprisoned for the 1975 murder of his underage victim, escaped from prison in January 1980. Between 12 and 16 February, he killed an additional three boys and a farm worker. He was arrested again several days later, but managed to escape. His ultimate fate is unclear.
2 November 1980	Chng Meng Joo		unknown	Singapore	Chng Meng Joo and his two childhood friends killed two people during a robbery in November 1980. The killers immediately fled to Malaysia. The two accomplices were arrested and charged for the double murder; one was sentenced to death for murder while the other was given a life sentence for manslaughter and armed robbery. Chng remains on the run as of today.
12 September 1983	Víctor Manuel Gerena		25	United States	Gerena is wanted by the Federal Bureau of Investigation for the September 1983 White Eagle armed robbery. The $7 million in cash that was stolen was the largest cash robbery in U.S. history at that time.
January 1984	Sukumara Kurup		38	India	Sukumara Kurup is one of the most wanted criminals in Kerala, India, sought in connection to the infamous Chacko murder case. On 21 January 1984, Kurup, under the pretense of offering a lift to Chacko, spiked his drink and subsequently strangled him and burnt his body. Kurup allegedly committed the crime with his two accomplices to fake his own death and claim the insurance proceeds. Upon realizing that the police were on to him, he fled and has been on the run since January 1984. Kurup remains untraced.
1984	Edward L. Montoro		52	United States	Motion picture producer/distributor Edward L. Montoro disappeared in 1984 after taking more than $1 million from his own company, Film Ventures International. It was speculated that he fled to Mexico.
24 October 1984	Buakkan Vajjarin		unknown	Singapore	Better known as "Ah Poo", the Thai national, who was then working in Singapore, was hired alongside two other Thais (Wan Pathong and Phan Khenapim) to help Phan's supervisor Vasavan Sathiadew and Tan's wife Lee Chee Poh to murder Vasavan's foster brother Frankie Tan, who had an affair with Vasavan's wife. After killing Tan, Ah Poo had fled Singapore and he remained missing since then, while the other conspirators (except for Lee) were executed for murder.
9 May 1985	Christopher Dale Flannery		46–47	Australia	Flannery, nicknamed "Mr. Rent-a-Kill", is alleged to have been an Australian contract killer. On 23 April 1985, Flannery was allegedly sent to murder Tony "Spaghetti" Eustace. Eustace was found, shot six times in the back outside the Airport Hilton in North Arncliffe. After this, Flannery disappeared and police stated that they believed Flannery to have been responsible for up to a dozen murders. He is presumed to be dead.
14 June 1985	Hassan Izz-Al-Din		22–23	Lebanon	Izz-Al-Din is a fugitive from Lebanon who is currently wanted by the U.S. government for his alleged involvement in the hijacking of TWA Flight 847 that took place on 14 June 1985. A reward of $5 million is being offered for information leading to his capture.
17 July 1985	Richard Lynn Bare		20	United States	Richard Lynn Bare was arrested for the death of Sherry Lyall Hart. Police suspect Bare tossed Hart off the cliff area on the night of 15 January 1984, when she refused and condemned his sexual advances. Bare then chased Hart down to his 1977 Ford Mustang and pistol-whipped her. Bare's accomplice, Jeffrey Burgess was taken to Ashe County jail, and Bare was taken to Wilkes County jail. Early on 17 July 1985 (18 months following the murder), Bare escaped and has not been seen since.
October 1985	Elizabeth Ann Duke		44	United States	Duke is an American fugitive and former teacher best known for her involvement with radical left-wing political organizations and subsequent flight from prosecution. She remains wanted by the Federal Bureau of Investigation on charges related to the bombings carried out by the May 19th Communist Organization in the early 1980s. Duke disappeared in October 1985 and her fate remains unknown. The FBI is offering a reward of up to $50,000 for information leading directly to the arrest and conviction of Duke.
1988	Alejandro Máynez		unknown	Mexico	Mexican drug trafficker responsible for the murders of at least two women in Ciudad Juárez between 1988 and 1990. The murders were committed with his cousin and a female accomplice, allegedly as part of a devil-worshipping cult. None of the trio have ever been arrested, and they remain fugitives from authorities.
12 April 1989	Arthur Lee Washington Jr.		39	United States	Washington, an American fugitive and member of the Black Liberation Army, disappeared after being involved in a shootout with a New Jersey state trooper on 12 April 1989. He was on the FBI Ten Most Wanted Fugitives list from 1989 to 2000 and has never been caught.

== 1990s ==
Date of disappearance	Person(s)	Image	Age (at disappearance)	Country	Circumstances
1990	Byron McLaughlin		35	United States	McLaughlin, a former Major League Baseball player, pleaded guilty in a California court to money laundering charges stemming from his production and sale of counterfeit footwear in Mexico but did not appear for his sentencing and is believed to have fled the country.
27 February 1991	Toh Laie		34	Singapore	A Singaporean citizen, Toh is suspected of the murder of Ng Keng Hua. He is alleged to have been one of the two burglars who invaded the home of Ng Keng Hua in February 1991. During a struggle, Ng was stabbed and eventually died. Toh was never seen again, although the police managed to identify him as a suspect and placed him on the wanted list for the murder. Police did arrest Toh's accomplice, Tan Bee Hock, who was ultimately brought to trial, found guilty, and sentenced to death for murdering Ng. Toh remains one of Singapore's 10 most wanted.
September 1991	Glen Stewart Godwin		33	United States	Godwin was sentenced to 26 years to life in prison for a 1980 murder and robbery in Palm Springs, California. Godwin escaped from Folsom State Prison in 1987. He fled to Mexico, where he was arrested and convicted for drug trafficking in 1991. While American authorities were working on Godwin's extradition proceedings, one of his fellow inmates at Puente Grande prison died. Godwin's extradition was delayed as it was suspected that he killed the inmate. Godwin was last seen in September 1991 before he escaped from Puente Grande prison.
9 February 1993	Aarni Neuvonen		unknown	Estonia	Neuvonen, real name Vadim Rozenberg, is alleged to be the largest-ever perpetrator of employment fraud in Estonia. He is accused of collecting money with promise of overseas jobs from thousands of people and disappearing after having caused more than an estimated 10 million EEK of damages in 1993.
12 March 1993	Chhota Shakeel		unknown	India	Shakeel, whose birth name is Mohammed Shakeel Babu Miyan Shaikh, is an Indian crime boss and high-ranking leader of the D-Company (Dawood Company), a criminal group based in South Asia. He became one of the most wanted men in India and the United States after his alleged participation in the 1993 Bombay bombings. It is unknown whether he is dead or alive
18 March 1993	Antonio Anglés		27	Spain	Anglés is a Spanish criminal sought in connection with the Alcàsser Girls crime that took place in Valencia during the night of 13 November 1992. Anglés friend Miquel Ricart was convicted of raping and killing the three girls that night, and it was alleged that Anglés was also present and participated. In 1993, Anglés fled, and his whereabouts remain a mystery.
October 1993	Roberto Solis		unknown	United States	Solis is an armored car robber and murderer who was imprisoned 17 years for the murder of a security guard during a robbery in 1969. Solis was given parole in 1992, but was involved with an armored car theft in October 1993 after which he disappeared.
10 November 1993	Adam Emery		31	United States	Emery disappeared from the Claiborne Pell Newport Bridge with his wife after being convicted of second-degree murder in Rhode Island on 10 November. He was released on bail, and the couple's car was found abandoned on the bridge. His wife's remains were found in 1994 in Narragansett Bay, and Emery was declared dead in absentia in 2004.
5 January 1994	Protais Mpiranya		33–34	Rwanda	A Rwandan soldier, who is alleged to have participated in the 1994 Rwandan genocide. Mpiranya fled Rwanda following the genocide. The UN war crimes tribunal offered a $5 million reward for Mpiranya's capture. It was later discovered that he had died in 2006 and had been living under an assumed name in Zimbabwe.
1994	Dawood Ibrahim Kaskar		38–39	India	Dawood Ibrahim is a Mumbai underworld criminal mobster, wanted on charges of murder, extortion, targeted killing, drug trafficking, and terrorism. He was designated as a global terrorist in 2003 by India and the United States with a reward of US$25 million for his capture for his believed role in the 1993 Bombay bombings. In 2011, he was named number three on The World's 10 Most Wanted Fugitives by the FBI and Forbes. He is currently believed to be residing in Pakistan, according to the Indian government, and heads the Indian organised crime syndicate D-Company which he founded in Mumbai in the 1970s.
11/12 August 1996	Vernon Henry		44	United States	Henry was a suspected familicide criminal who murdered his daughter, Heather Jenee, and his wife, Connie Marie with a gun not long after Heather came back following a night with her boyfriend. Several children of the Henry family witnessed the crime when it happened. As of 2022 Henry has not been arrested, although he is wanted for two counts of first-degree murder, for unlawful flight to avoid prosecution and using a firearm when committing a felony.
June 1997	Attilio Cubeddu		52	Italy	Cubeddu is a criminal from Sardinia who was a member of Anonima sarda, a term used for bandits engaged in various kinds of crime in the island, in particular kidnapping, from the 1960s onward. Since 1997, he is on the "List of most wanted fugitives in Italy" of the ministry of the Interior, since he disappeared after he left the prison of Badu 'e Carros in Nuoro, where he was detained for murder, serious injury and kidnapping. In 1998 investigations were extended internationally for his extradition.
1997	Shafi Muhammad Burfat		31–32	Pakistan	Shafi Muhammad Burfat is the founder and current chairman of Jeay Sindh Muttahida Mahaz, a party in Sindh, Pakistan which believes in the freedom of Sindhudesh from Pakistan. On 1 April 2013 the party was declared a terrorist organization and banned by the home ministry of Pakistan. Burfat has been added by the Federal Investigation Agency to its Red Book and his whereabouts remain unknown.
9 March 1998	Gilbert Wynter		37	United Kingdom	Wynter, a jeweler and enforcer for the Adams crime family, disappeared in London on 9 March 1998. His disappearance is believed to be related to the murder of Saul Nahome in December that year; both men were involved in a drug deal where £800,000 went missing.
21 April 1998	Chan Kai-kit		48	Macau	A member of the Legislative Assembly of Macau and of the Chinese People's Political Consultative Conference, Chan was accused of conspiracy to defraud Guangnan Holding in 1999. Chan disappeared sometime after 21 April 1998 when he attended a formal Legislative Assembly meeting. His whereabouts remain unknown.
1 May 1998	Michel Barrera		18	United States	Bank robber and possible MS-13 gang member active in the Miami metropolitan area wanted on charges of bank robbery and attempted murder of police officers. He is additionally suspected of a murder in 2007.
1998	Mahmut Yıldırım		47	Turkey	A Turkish rogue agent of Zaza origins, Yıldırım is wanted for the murders of eight individuals. He disappeared in 1998.
9 November 1998	John Ruffo		43	United States	Ruffo is an American former business executive, white-collar criminal and confidence man, who in 1998 was convicted in a scheme to defraud many US and foreign banking institutions of over US$350 million: one of the most significant cases of bank fraud in US history. He disappeared on 9 November 1998 and has been a fugitive from justice ever since. He is on the U.S. Marshals 15 Most Wanted Fugitives list.
1998	Giovanni Motisi		48	Italy	Giovanni Motisi is a member of the Mafia in Sicily from the Altarello neighborhood in Palermo. He has been on the most wanted list of the Italian ministry of the Interior since 1998. In March 2001, he escaped an attempt to arrest him. In 2002 he was replaced as the capo mandamento of the Pagliarelli neighborhood because as a fugitive he did not manage the Mafia family sufficiently, and is currently wanted by the government.
1999	"Mani"		unknown	Singapore	Only known as "Mani", an Indian national was hired as the driver of a getaway vehicle for Loganatha Venkatesan, an Indian worker who had an affair with a retired police inspector's wife. Loganatha and his girlfriend Julaiha Begum plotted with two more male acquaintances to commit the murder of Julaiha's husband T. Maniam, and Mani was in charge of helping to drive the hired killers and Venkatesan to Maniam's bungalow, where Venkatesan and his accomplices killed Maniam on 21 April 1999. Venkatesan, Julaiha and the remaining others were convicted and hanged for murder on 16 February 2001, while Mani was never found
5 May 1999	Chew Tse Meng		38	Singapore	Aw Teck Boon, a notorious ganglord in Singapore, was found murdered on 5 May 1999. Through police investigations, a 38-year-old man named Chew Tse Meng was identified as the prime suspect, after he was the last person seen arguing with the victim over unresolved disputes shortly before Aw's death. Chew was listed on the wanted list but his current whereabouts are unknown. A coroner's court recorded a verdict of murder by person or persons unknown, although Chew is still sought after for his alleged involvement in the crime.
September 1999	Pedro Alonso López		53	Colombia	Pedro Alonso López is a serial killer who was active in the nations of Colombia, Ecuador and Peru. López claimed to have raped and murdered over 300 young girls starting in 1969. He mainly targeted girls who were 12 years old and came from impoverished families. In 1980, Pedro López was arrested by Ecuadorian police after an attempted abduction, where he proceeded to confess to the murders of 103 girls. He was sentenced to 16 years' imprisonment. After serving 14 years of his sentence, Pedro López was declared "insane" and committed to a mental hospital in Colombia, where he spent the next year. In 1998, López was found by officials to be "legally sane", so he was released from custody. His whereabouts are currently a mystery, but López is still wanted in connection to a 2002 cold case in Peru.

== 2000s ==
Date of disappearance	Person(s)	Image	Age (at disappearance)	Country	Circumstances
17 March 2000	Credonia Mwerinde		47	Uganda	Credonia Mwerinde was a co-founder of the Movement for the Restoration of the Ten Commandments of God; a sect that splintered from the Roman Catholic Church in Uganda. Members believed the world was going to end upon the millennium. When it did not, many members of the sect expressed discontent. Police believe Mwerinde set fire to the Kanungu Church which killed more than 900 followers on 17 March, and authorities discovered two mass graves containing additional mutilated human remains.
2000	Lim Hin Teck		34	Singapore	Both Singaporean citizens. Lim and Ong were part of a gang of four people who are alleged to have attacked and killed moneylender Leong Fook Weng in May 2000, punishing him for betraying his original gang and joining another. After allegedly stabbing Leong to death, the gang fled Singapore to other countries. Two of them, Robson Tay Teik Chai and See Chee Keong, were caught in 2002 and 2013 respectively. After their repatriation to Singapore, Tay was given a jail term of nine years with 12 strokes of the cane for manslaughter while See was similarly convicted of manslaughter and sentenced to ten years in prison. Ong and Lim remain at large.
2000	Ong Chin Huat		38	Singapore	
September 2000	Peter Tham		52	Singapore	Stockbroker and former director of Pan-Electric Industries who fled the country circa September 2000, amidst an investigation that he was concealing personal assets. He was last traced to the Indonesian island of Batam, but disappeared completely after that.
28 March 2001	David Carroll		48	Canada	A Canadian outlaw biker and a reputed gangster who disappeared on 28 March 2001 after being indicted on 13 counts of first-degree murder. At the time the warrant was issued, Carroll was in Ixtapa, Mexico.
2001	Tahir Jalil Habbush		51	Iraq	Former government official who served as the head of intelligence under Saddam Hussein, known for informing MI6 that the country had no WMDs. A reward of up to $1 million is available for any information leading to his capture. Habbush died at an Erbil hospital in 2026, though the circumstances of his escape and disappearance are still unknown.
2001	John Paul		62	United States	Paul, an American racecar driver who was last seen in Thailand, disappeared on his boat in 2001 while being sought for questioning by officials regarding the disappearance of his ex-girlfriend, and has not been seen since.
10 April 2001	Robert William Fisher		40	United States	Fisher disappeared after 10 April 2001, after his house in Scottsdale, Arizona blew up and caught fire. His family was found dead in the home and he is believed to be the person who murdered them and rigged the natural gas explosion.
May 2001	Muhammad Syamsul Ariffin bin Brahim		18	Singapore	Both Singaporean citizens. The two youths were among the group of eight Salakau gang members accused of murdering a 17-year-old national footballer, Sulaiman bin Hashim, whom they mistook as a rival gang member, in May 2001. While Syamsul Ariffin and Sharulhawzi both fled to Malaysia and remain at large, their six accomplices (including the gang leader Norhisham Mohamed Dahlan) were jailed and caned for various offences ranging from rioting to manslaughter.
May 2001	Sharulhawzi bin Ramly		Unknown	Singapore	Both Singaporean citizens. The two youths were among the group of eight Salakau gang members accused of murdering a 17-year-old national footballer, Sulaiman bin Hashim, whom they mistook as a rival gang member, in May 2001. While Syamsul Ariffin and Sharulhawzi both fled to Malaysia and remain at large, their six accomplices (including the gang leader Norhisham Mohamed Dahlan) were jailed and caned for various offences ranging from rioting to manslaughter.
Early 2002	Alyan Muhammad Ali al-Wa'eli		unknown	Yemen	Ali al-Wa'eli is an Arab fugitive from Yemen who was formerly on the "Seeking Information" lists, and been wanted since 11 February 2002 by the United States Department of Justice's FBI. Ali al-Wa'eli was identified as a known associate of the Yemen cell leader and al-Qaeda terrorist, Fawaz Yahya al-Rabeei. Ali al-Wa'eli's current whereabouts are unknown.
2002	Renato Cinquegranella		52–53	Italy	Cinquegranella is an Italian criminal and a member of the Camorra. Cinquegranella is on the "list of most wanted fugitives in Italy" of the ministry of the Interior. Since 2002 Cinquegranella is wanted for mafia-type criminal association, murder, illegal possession of weapons and extortion.
March 2002	Achemez Gochiyayev		31–32	Russia	Gochiyayev, a Russian from Karachayevsk, is believed to be behind the Russian apartment bombings, terrorist actions that took place in 1999 that killed 293 people and led Russia into the Second Chechen War. He is a wanted fugitive in Russia. After 5 March 2002, according to news reports, he is said to have fled to Georgia and later probably to Turkey, after he was last seen in 2002. His current whereabouts are unknown.
2003	Sajida Talfah		66	Iraq	Talfah is the cousin and widow of former Iraq President Saddam Hussein, who is believed to have fled Iraq and went to Qatar on 19 March 2003 hours before the bombing of Baghdad. Talfah has not been seen since 2006, when she left Iraq having been placed on the most wanted list for allegedly supporting insurgents.
2003	Carlos Meneses Lambis		38–39	Panama	Convicted rapist and extortionist who has been implicated in the murders of a prostitute and a domestic worker, committed in 2003 and 2004, respectively. He is also believed to be involved in the disappearance of a girlfriend, but charges were dropped in that case. Consistently ranked among Panama's Top Ten Most Wanted Fugitives.
2003	John Barton		51	United Kingdom	Barton is wanted for conspiring to import a commercial amount of heroin worth £10m into the UK between 1999 and 2000. Convicted and sentenced in his absence to 20 years imprisonment in 2003, Barton failed to return for his trial after being granted permission to travel to Amsterdam to prepare his defence with his solicitor. He is currently on the National Crime Agency's (NCA) most wanted list with 18 other fugitives and is believed to be in Spain, possibly in Fuengirola.
12 May 2003	Saif al-Adel		unknown	Egypt	Saif al-Adel is the Egyptian de facto leader of al-Qaeda and a former military colonel. Adel was placed on the FBI's list of most wanted terrorists since it was started in 2001. The State Department's Rewards for Justice Program is currently offering up to US$10 million for information on his location. Both Al-Adel and Saad bin Laden were implicated in the suicide bombing that took place on 12 May 2003 in Riyadh, Saudi Arabia.
2003	Jorge López Pérez		unknown	Mexico	López, who is nicknamed "El Chuta", is a Mexican suspected drug lord and high-ranking member of Los Zetas, a criminal group based in Tamaulipas, Mexico. López had an unspecified bounty placed on him on 18 June 2003, and has not been seen since then.
2 April 2004	Ng Kim Soon		43	Singapore	Ng is alleged to have been responsible for the murder of Bock Tuan Thong, initially a kidnapping and attempted robbery of the scrap car dealer. When Ng and his two alleged accomplices, Tony Koh Zhan Quan and Lim Poh Lye, restrained Bock, Bock was stabbed in his femoral artery. He bled to death. Ng and Koh escaped to Malaysia while Lim remained behind in Singapore, where he was arrested. Koh later surrendered himself. Eventually, the two men were found guilty of murder, sentenced to death, and were hanged on 28 April 2006. Ng, who was last known to have escaped to Malaysia, remains missing and is still wanted for Bock's murder.
2004	Masood Azhar		45	Pakistan	Azhar is the founder and leader of the Pakistan-based terrorist organisation Jaish-e-Mohammed, active mainly in the Pakistani-administered portion of the state of Jammu and Kashmir. He was arrested in December 2001, detained for one year and reappeared on 26 January 2014 after being in seclusion. He was not seen after that, but was said to be behind several attacks. On 1 May 2019, Masood Azhar was listed as an international terrorist by the United Nations Security Council, and is currently wanted by the government.
August 2004	Vicente Castaño		47	Colombia	Former leader of the United Self-Defense Forces of Colombia, a right-wing paramilitary organization responsible for the murders of opposing leftist guerillas and narcotrafficking. Aside from these charges, Castaño is wanted for allegedly murdering his brother Carlos Castaño Gil.
August 2005	Heloísa Gonçalves Duque Soares Ribeiro		55	Brazil	Known as "The Black Widow"; bigamist who was convicted in absentia for orchestrating the murder of ex-husband Jorge Ribeiro in Copacabana, Rio de Janeiro in 1992 and sentenced to 18 years imprisonment. She has also been accused, but thus far not charged, in at least three other murders, two attempted murders and numerous financial crimes.
November 2005	Ye Zheyun		40	China	Ye, a Chinese businessman who was accused of being involved in a Belgian football corruption and betting scandals, was last seen in early November 2005 and has not been seen since. He was convicted in absentia in Belgium in 2014.
January 2006	Iqlaque Fakir Mohammed Shaikh		29	India	Iqlaque Fakir Mohammed Shaikh from New Mangalwar Peth, India, was sentenced to life imprisonment for the murder of Gudrun Corvinus, a German archaeologist of the Nepal Research Center in Kathmandu. She was a member of the Afar expedition in Ethiopia which discovered the famous skeleton called "Lucy". The public prosecutor of the case, Neelima Vartak, stated that Corvinus was murdered for her property. Shaikh was given 14 days' parole to look after his sick wife, but on the last day of parole was suspected to have run off with his wife and mother. Despite numerous sightings, he is still at large and has not been taken into custody.
3 February 2006	Abdullah Al-Rimi		unknown	Yemen	Al-Rimi, or Abdullah Ahmed Al-Remi, has been described as an "important al-Qaeda recruiter", and became wanted by the FBI, and sought in connection with possible terrorist threats against the United States. On 3 February 2006, together with 22 others, 12 of them al-Qaeda members, Al-Rimi escaped from a Yemeni jail in Sanaa, according to a BBC report. They reportedly escaped by digging a 140-metre tunnel to a nearby mosque.
Early 2006	Abd Al Aziz Awda		55	Palestine	Abd Al Aziz Awda is one of the founders of the Islamic Jihad Movement in Palestine or Palestinian Islamic Jihad (PIJ). Awda was listed as a "Specially Designated Terrorist" under United States law on 23 January 1995, and has been wanted since 24 February 2006.
2006	Fawzi Mutlaq al-Rawi		unknown	Iraq	Mutlaq al-Rawi, the leader of the Syrian led Ba'athist movement in Iraq, was added to the Iraq Most Wanted List in 2006 and has not been seen since.
2006	Ali Sayyid Muhamed Mustafa al-Bakri		39	Egypt	Member of Al-Qaeda's Shura council and former member of Egyptian Islamic Jihad known for financing and training militants. On the list since 2006, he is believed to be hiding in Iran.
2006	Mohammed Younis al-Ahmed		unknown	Iraq	Younis al-Ahmed is a former senior member of the Ba'ath Party in Iraq. He disappeared in 2006, potentially went into hiding, and a large bounty has been placed on him.
2007	Abdulreza Shahlai		50	Iran	Iranian brigadier general serving in the Quds Force who was designated as a terrorist by the United States government, alleging that he has funded terrorist groups responsible for the murder of American troops in Iraq and for a failed assassination attempt against a former Saudi Arabian ambassador.
November 2007	Omid Tahvili		37	Canada	Tahvili, an Iranian Canadian gangster who is the kingpin of an organized crime family in Canada which is connected to various international crime organizations, escaped from jail in November 2007 disguised as a janitor. In April 2008, Forbes.com, after consulting law enforcement agencies around the world, listed him as one of the world's ten most wanted fugitives.
14 March 2008	Farouk Abdulhak		21	Yemen	Abdulhak is suspected of the 2008 rape and murder of Norwegian student Martine Vik Magnussen in London. The son of the late Yemeni billionaire Shaher Abdulhak, he fled to Yemen hours after the crime and has not been seen since.
August 2008	Jason Derek Brown		38	United States	Brown is an American fugitive wanted for first-degree murder and armed robbery in Phoenix, Arizona on 29 November 2004, and on 8 December 2007 was named by the FBI as the 489th fugitive to be placed on the Ten Most Wanted list. His last confirmed sighting was in Salt Lake City in August 2008.
12 January 2009	Shaileshkumar Jain		39	India	Indian internet entrepreneur indicted in California for several counts of wire fraud and trafficking of stolen goods dating back to 2001, but fled the country after failing to appear at trial. He is currently sought after by the FBI, who are offering a reward for any information leading to his arrest.
22 February 2009	Vassilis Palaiokostas		42	Greece	Palaiokostas is a Greek fugitive who escaped by helicopter twice from the Greek high-security Korydallos Prison while serving a 25-year sentence for kidnapping and robbery. He is believed to have been the mastermind of the kidnapping of Giorgos Mylonas, a Greek industrialist, as well as being convicted for the 1995 kidnapping of Alexander Haitoglou, the CEO of Haitoglou Bros, a food company in Northern Greece and sentenced to 25 years in prison. On the afternoon of 22 February, Palaiokostas again escaped from Korydallos Prison by helicopter, and has not been seen since.
2009	Edgardo Leyva Escandón		40	Mexico	Leyva is a Mexican suspected criminal and high-ranking member of the Tijuana Cartel, a criminal group based in Baja California. On 22 October 2009, the United States Department of the Treasury sanctioned Leyva Escandón under the Foreign Narcotics Kingpin Designation Act, for his involvement in drug trafficking. He is currently wanted in Mexico.

== 2010s ==
Date of disappearance	Person(s)	Image	Age at disappearance	Country	Circumstances
23 January 2011	David Durham		43	United States	Durham was pulled over in a routine traffic stop by a Lincoln City, Oregon policeman on the night of 23 January and is alleged to have shot the officer. He has not been seen since. Law enforcement investigators have theorized that Durham attempted to swim across Alsea Bay and drowned.
4 March 2011	Prakashanand Saraswati		82	India	Religious leader and writer who founded the Radha Madhav Dham, a non-profit organization that promotes Hinduist values. In 2008, Saraswati was denounced by three former members who said he had sexually molested them as children, and subsequently convicted of 20 counts of child molestation in 2011. However, before he could be imprisoned, his bail was paid and he promptly disappeared, possibly escorted by followers to Mexico from there to India using a fake ID.
15 April 2011	Xavier Dupont de Ligonnès		50	France	Suspected of murdering his family, Dupont de Ligonnès disappeared from Nantes, France. His wife, four children and two dogs had been shot and buried in the back garden of the family home. He was seen leaving a hotel in south-eastern France a few days after his family was murdered. He was the prime suspect in the killings and the subject of an international arrest warrant. His whereabouts remain unknown.
August 2011	Pharmacy Maniac		unknown	Russia	Unidentified individual who murdered two men at pharmacies in Chelyabinsk, Russia, in two separate attacks in 2011. The motive for the attacks remains unknown, and a reward of 1,000,000 rubles was assigned for his capture.
October 2011	Mohammed Ali Ege		40 - 45	United Kingdom	Ege is alleged to have been behind the murder of Aamir Siddiqi, a botched contract killing of a man with whom he had been in a property dispute, for £1,000. The men he is alleged to have paid, Jason Richards and Ben Hope, were supposed to carry out the murder on 11 April 2010, but inadvertently went to the wrong house, instead murdering 17-year-old Aamir Siddiqi, who opened the door expecting a visit from his imam for a Koran lesson. Richards and Hope were found guilty of murder at Swansea Crown Court and sentenced to life imprisonment with a minimum of 40 years, and Ege was arrested on suspicion of conspiracy to commit murder in India in October 2011. He escaped custody whilst using a toilet at a Delhi railway station as Indian authorities were in the process of extraditing him to the UK and has not been seen since.
2011	Ezedin Abdel Aziz Khalil		28–39	Iran	Khalil who is also known as Yasin al-Suri, is allegedly a senior al-Qaeda facilitator and financier based in Iran, according to the U.S. government. As of 22 December 2011, a $10 million reward was being offered from the U.S. Rewards for Justice Program for his capture.
January 2012	Samantha Lewthwaite		28	United Kingdom	Lewthwaite, who is also known as Sherafiyah Lewthwaite and The White Widow, is a British Muslim woman who is a fugitive from Kenya and one of the most wanted terrorism suspects in the world, and is also believed to be a member of the radical Islamic militant group Al-Shabaab which is Somalia-based. Lewthwaite has been wanted since 4 January 2012 and there is currently a warrant for her arrest.
24 September 2012	Eugene Palmer		73	United States	Palmer is an American fugitive who was added to the FBI Ten Most Wanted Fugitives list on 29 May 2019. He is wanted for allegedly shooting and killing his daughter-in-law, Tammy Palmer, on 24 September 2012 in Stony Point, New York. Palmer is the 523rd fugitive to be placed on the FBI's Ten Most Wanted Fugitives list. The FBI is offering a reward of up to $100,000 for information leading to his capture.
19 January 2013	Fausto Isidro Meza Flores		30	Mexico	Meza Flores is a Mexican drug lord and high-ranking leader of the Beltrán Leyva Cartel. The FBI offered a US$5 million bounty for information regarding his whereabouts. His last known residence was in the state of Nuevo León, where he was reportedly seen with some of his family members at a youth basketball game in San Pedro Garza García on 19 January 2013.
April 2013	Lo Fu-chu		69	Taiwan	Lo, a Taiwanese politician, was at one time the leader of the Celestial Alliance criminal organization. On 28 March 2013, Lo was convicted of stock manipulation, money laundering, and insider trading and was sentenced to four years in jail and fined NT$6 million (US$200,000). Later he was released on a NT$10 million (US$330,000) bond, but then failed to report to police on 24 April 2013 when he was to start his sentence. He is believed to have fled to either the United States, Australia, or China, where he has many relatives and friends, but this is unknown for sure.
28 December 2013	Febri Irwansyah Djatmiko		31	Singapore	Indonesian fish farm worker who is alleged to have been recruited by his Singaporean employer Chia Kee Chen to come to Singapore and murder 37-year-old Dexmon Chua Yizhi, the lover of Chia's wife. After allegedly abducting and murdering Chua on 28 December 2013, Febri fled to Malaysia before heading to Indonesia. Singaporean authorities sought the assistance of Interpol, which issued a red notice for Febri's arrest. Febri was eventually located by the Indonesian police and he gave statements relating to the murder, but he was not extradited back to Singapore for trial due to the absence of an extradition treaty between Indonesia and Singapore. As for Chia, he was charged with murder and sentenced to death in 2018 while a third accomplice served a five-year sentence for abetting the abduction. As of 2024, Febri remains at large in Indonesia and his current status is unknown, and he remains on Interpol's "Red Notice" list.
19 February 2014	Oleksandr Yakymenko		50	Ukraine	Russian-Ukrainian military pilot and former Head of the Security Service indicted on terrorism charges following the Euromaidan protests in February 2014. Along with other top officials, he fled to Russia, where he presumably resides to this day.
February 2014	Andriy Klyuyev		50	Russia	Politician and businessman indicted on 7 March 2014, on charges of mass murder relating to the war in Donbas. Klyuyev supposedly fled to and currently lives in Donetsk, which is controlled by the separatist Donetsk People's Republic.
29 June 2014	Bastian Vasquez		24	Norway	Vasquez who is also known as Abu Safiyyah is a Norwegian jihadist who became wanted after failing to appear in court in 2013 for being in propaganda videos for the Islamic State of Iraq and the Levant (ISIL). As of 29 June 2014 Vasquez was known to have appeared as the presenter in an ISIL propaganda video that was released by Al Hayat Media Center. Vasquez, who has not been heard from after that, is believed to have been murdered in early 2015, but this is not known for certain to be true.
July 2014	Anders Cameroon Østensvig Dale		35	Norway	Dale, also known as Muslim Abu Abdurrahman and Abu Abdurrahman the Norwegian, is a Norwegian Yemen-based terrorist who since 2022, and as of February 2026, has been in detention by the Houthis in Yemen. The Norwegian authorities have dropped their investigation. In September 2014 he was blacklisted by the United Nations Security Council as one of 11 wanted terrorists since the United States had requested his blacklisting.
15 September 2014	Tiger Memon		54	India	Memon, also known as Ibrahim Mushtaq Abdul Razzaq Memon, is an Indian terrorist and one of the prime suspects for the 1993 Bombay bombings, which resulted in the deaths of 257 people. He was indicted for the crime on 15 September 2014, together with three of his brothers, but he remains at large.
2014	Ibrahim al-Banna		48–49	Egypt	Al-Banna who is also known as Abu Ayman al-Masri is an Egyptian fugitive who on 14 October 2014 was added to the U.S. State Department's Rewards for Justice wanted list. After al-Banna had fled to Yemen he was thought to have been killed on 15 February 2018 by gunmen from the Nour al-Din al-Zenki Movement in Syria. This was later proven to be false and al-Banna is currently being sought.
January 2015	Mykola Azarov		67	Ukraine	Politician and former Prime Minister of Ukraine from 2010 to 2014, wanted on charges of abuse of power and embezzlement. He has set up a government in exile outside the country, which is seen as a pro-Russian puppet.
10 January 2015	Hayat Boumeddiene		26	France	Boumeddiene is a French woman currently being sought by French police as a suspected accomplice of her common law husband Amedy Coulibaly, who killed one police officer in the Montrouge shooting of 8 January 2015, and four people he had taken hostage in the Porte de Vincennes siege of 9 January, in which he was killed by police. Boumeddiene had moved to ISIS-held areas in Iraq and Syria shortly before the attacks. Although she was reported dead in March 2019, a witness claimed she had escaped from Al-Hawl in November 2019. She was convicted in absentia to a 30-year prison sentence on 16 December 2020.
April 2015	Tareq Kamleh		29–30	Australia	Kamleh is an Australian fugitive and medical doctor who had joined the Islamic extremist group ISIL in 2015 to work as a paediatric doctor after traveling to Syria and has tried to get other doctors to join as well. In June 2018 several Islamic State fighters tweeted that Kamleh had been killed during the battle of Raqqa in either September or October 2017, but this has not been verified.
April 2015	Ahmad Umar		43	Somalia	High-ranking Somali militant and current leader of Al-Shabaab, appointed after the death of his predecessor in April 2015.
10 April 2015	Zakiur Rehman Lakhvi		48–49	Pakistan	Zaki-ur-Rehman Lakhavi, a Pakistani Islamic militant and Islamist who is known as the top leader of the militant group Lashkar-e-Taiba and currently serves as Supreme Commander of operations in Kashmir and as a member of LeT's General Council. Although Lakhvi was released from jail on bail on 10 April 2015, he is currently listed on India's NIA Most Wanted list.
2015	Nemesio Oseguera Cervantes		48	Mexico	Oseguera, also known as "El Mencho", was a Mexican drug lord and leader of the Jalisco New Generation Cartel (CJNG), a criminal group based in Jalisco. He was wanted for drug trafficking, organized crime involvement, and illegal possession of firearms. Oseguera was reportedly responsible for coordinating drug trafficking operations in the Americas, Europe, Asia, Africa, and Oceania. Under his command, the CJNG became one of Mexico's leading criminal organizations. He was the most-wanted criminal in Mexico and one of the most-wanted in the U.S.; both governments offered up to MXN$30 million and US$10 million, respectively, for information leading to his arrest. On 22 February 2026, Oseguera was killed during a military operation in Jalisco.
12 April 2015	Bhadreshkumar Chetanbhai Patel		24	India	Patel is an Indian fugitive suspected of murdering his wife at a Dunkin' Donuts store in Hanover, Maryland on 12 April 2015. He was last seen at Newark Penn Station. He was added to the FBI Ten Most Wanted Fugitives list on 18 April 2017.
2016	Jho Low		35	Malaysia	Malaysian businessman accused of masterminding the fraud scheme of the 1MDB scandal, from which he funnelled US$4.5 billion into his personal bank accounts. An international fugitive, he is believed to be hiding in Macau, China.
2016	Jorge Luis Mendoza Cárdenas		unknown	Mexico	Mendoza Cárdenas is a Mexican suspected drug lord known as La Garra and high-ranking leader of the Jalisco New Generation Cartel (CJNG). In August 2008, he was arrested for his alleged participation in the murder of a family of six in Jalisco, but he was later released from prison without a public explanation and his name was not mentioned in the legal proceedings. He has been wanted by the Drug Enforcement Administration since November 2016.
13 September 2017	Syed Salahuddin		73	Pakistan	Syed Mohammed Yusuf Shah, commonly known as Syed Salahudeen, is the head of Hizb-ul-Mujahideen, a pro-Pakistan Kashmiri separatist militant organisation operating in Kashmir. He also heads the United Jihad Council, a Pakistan-based conglomeration of jihadist militant groups, with the goal of annexing Jammu and Kashmir to Pakistan. Salahuddin vowed to block any peaceful resolution to the Kashmir conflict, threatened to train more Kashmiri suicide bombers, and vowed to turn the Kashmir Valley "into a graveyard for Indian forces". He is currently listed on the Most Wanted List of India's National Investigation Agency. He is named as a Specially Designated Global Terrorist by the U.S. Department of State.
25 October 2017	Ruja Ignatova		37	Bulgaria	Bulgarian convicted fraudster who founded a cryptocurrency Ponzi scheme known as OneCoin, which has been described by The Times as "one of the biggest scams in history" and duped billions of dollars from investors. Ignatova has not been seen since 2017; she was charged in absentia by U.S. authorities in early 2019 on charges of wire fraud, securities fraud and money laundering and faces up to 90 years in prison for her role in the OneCoin scheme.
February 2018	Sami al-Oraydi		45	Jordan	Jordanian militant who served as a former religious authority for the Al-Nusra Front, before being appointed as the senior sharia official for the Guardians of Religion Organization in February 2018. al-Oraydi allegedly died during a US-led Coalition strike in June 2026, however this has not been confirmed by any governmental or western outlets.
January 2019	Dmytro Salamatin		54	Ukraine	Former politician and government official indicted on charges of abuse of power in favor of Russia, allegedly costing the country $560 million. He is believed to have fled into Russia, and to be currently living there.
September 2019	Abu Humam al-Shami		41–42	Syria	Former military chief of the al-Qaeda affiliated Al-Nusra Front and leader of the Guardians of Religion Organization. He was falsely reported as deceased in 2015, but this was disproven when the U.S. Department of Justice announced a reward for his apprehension on 12 September 2019.
November 2019	Ibrahim al Qosi		59	Sudan	Sudanese paymaster for Al-Qaeda who was previously interned at Guantanamo Bay. He was repatriated to his native country in 2012, but has since moved to Yemen and resumed activities for the militant group, for which he was designated a Wanted Terrorist in November 2019.

== 2020s ==
Date of disappearance	Person(s)	Image	Age (at disappearance)	Country	Circumstances
June 2020	Jan Marsalek		40	Austria	The Austrian former manager and COO of the (defunct) German payment-processing firm Wirecard is considered a prime culprit in what became known as the Wirecard scandal. He disappeared in June 2020, shortly before the fraud emerged. He is also suspected to have been involved in multiple other crimes, including espionage and the theft of at least €500 million. Marsalek was believed to have fled to Russia, Belarus or another country. In March 2024, Der Spiegel's English-language website published a detailed investigation into Marsalek's alleged involvement with Russian state agencies.
November 2020	Abu Ubaidah Youssef al-Annabi		52	Algeria	Jihadist militant and current emir (leader) of al-Qaeda in the Islamic Maghreb, designated as a wanted terrorist by the U.S. since November 2020.
Early 2021	Taras Kozak		49	Ukraine	Kozak is a politician, media proprietor and businessman wanted on charges of treason and attempted looting of national funds from occupied Crimea. He is believed to be residing in Belarus.
2021	Yulan Adonay Archaga Carias		39	Honduras	Archaga Carias is a Honduran fugitive who was added to the FBI Ten Most Wanted Fugitives list on 3 November 2021, the 526th fugitive to be placed on that list. He is wanted for racketeering, narcotics trafficking, and firearms offenses. The FBI is offering a reward of up to $5 million for information leading to his capture.
June 2021	Tomás Antonio Gimeno Casañas		37	Spain	Gimeno is accused of the murders of his daughters, six-year-old Olivia and one-year-old Anna Zimmerman, in April 2021 after a heated argument with the girls' mother, Beatriz Zimmerman. On June 10, Olivia's body was found on a seabed of the Canary Islands. Gimeno and Anna have been missing ever since.
17 December 2021	Gillmore Hoefdraad		58	Suriname	Hoefdraad was a former governor of the Central Bank and Minister of Finance of Suriname. He disappeared in July when the Prosecutor General filed a request to the National Assembly to prosecute him for dubious transactions. He was sentenced in absentia to 12 years imprisonment in December 2021. Last seen in Skeldon, Guyana.
December 26, 2021	Abel Acosta		14	United States	Acosta is alleged to have killed three people and injured one in the 2021 Garland shooting at a Texaco station in Garland, Texas on December 26, 2021. His father was arrested and convicted for aiding him in the murders, but Acosta himself disappeared following the shooting and is believed to be in Mexico.
September 2022	Poh Yuan Nie		56	Singapore	Poh Yuan Nie was a principal of a private tuition centre in Singapore. Poh was charged in October 2016 with masterminding a sophisticated scheme of abetting six students from China to cheat in the Singapore-Cambridge GCE O-level examinations. Poh was given a jail term of four years while her co-conspirators were jailed between two and three years. Poh was allowed to remain out of prison on bail while pending her appeal, which was dismissed in November 2022. In September 2022, despite a court order informing her to begin her jail term during that same month, Poh did not surrender herself and failed to appear in court. Authorities suspected that Poh had fled Singapore and she was therefore placed on top of Singapore's most wanted list. Interpol also issued a red notice for Poh's arrest in January 2023. As of 2026, Poh remains on the run.
31 March 2023	Caleb Awe		20	United Kingdom	All UK citizens. The three fugitives were alleged to be part of a gang who killed 18-year-old Jamie Meah with a three- to four-foot sword after dragging him out of a taxi in Armley, Leeds. Enquiries showed they had initially travelled to Liverpool before travelling on a ferry from Fishguard in Wales to Rosslare under false names. The three were also later arrested for a petty theft on May 4, 2023, but were released as Gardaí had no knowledge that all three were wanted for murder. As of 2026, all three are still on the run.
31 March 2023	Aquade Jeffers		20	United Kingdom	
31 March 2023	Enham Nishat		20	United Kingdom	

== See also ==
- Lists of people who disappeared
