= John Barton (fugitive) =

- Born: 1956; Mansfield, Nottinghamshire
- Disappeared: 2003; Amsterdam, Netherlands
- Status: Missing
- Occupations: Businessman; Fugitive
- Criminal charges: Drug Trafficking
- Penalty: 20 years imprisonment (Sentenced in absentia)

John Barton is a British fugitive and businessman who is wanted for conspiring to import a commercial amount of heroin worth £10m into the UK between 1999 and 2000. Convicted and sentenced in his absence to 20 years imprisonment in 2003, Barton failed to return for his trial after being granted permission to travel. He is currently on the National Crime Agency's (NCA) most wanted list with 18 other fugitives and is believed to be in Spain, possibly in Fuengirola.

== Background ==
John Barton was born in 1956 in Mansfield, Nottinghamshire. At the time of the conspiracy, Barton had been living in the village of Caunton, on Main Road, and he was a businessman, specifically a carpet importer.

== Criminal Activity ==
In March 1999, undercover HM Revenue & Customs officers witnessed Barton take out a bag from the boot of his car in Mansfield. He then proceeded to hand it over to a known Dutch supplier of heroin with connections to Turkey and Sweden. At the time the officers, along with the Dutch police, were certain the bag contained money. However, the dealer was arrested just two days later and Barton never received his drugs which he had invested in. In September 1999, Barton was seen attempting to set up another deal with other members of the drugs syndicate upon visiting the dealer in prison, this time £10 million of heroin which was planned to be smuggled from Holland.

However, Barton was arrested in June 2000 after a huge police and Customs surveillance operation, before the heroin transportation could be carried out. He was supposed to be brought to trial in 2003 at Nottingham Crown Court.

== Disappearance ==
Before his trial Barton was granted permission by the Judge, Judge Michael Stokes, to travel to Amsterdam to discuss his defence with his solicitor. In a hearing at Nottingham Crown Court Barton's legal team told Judge Stokes that the court would be in breach of the Human Rights Act if Barton was not allowed to travel abroad to prepare his defence. Barton had been required to surrender his passport as a condition of his bail, so he should not have had his own legitimate passport when he went to the city. However, Judge Stokes feared Barton, if found guilty, would have clear grounds to appeal on the basis of not receiving a fair trial. So he therefore agreed to hand back his passport. Judge Stokes defended his decision to free Barton, telling the Sunday Mirror: "There has to be a reason not to allow somebody bail, and if the prosecution say they have no objections how can the judge do otherwise?"

After arriving in Amsterdam Barton promptly absconded despite attempts to locate him. It is believed by the National Crime Agency that Barton was able to flee to Costa Del Sol in Spain, specifically Fuengirola.

== Investigation and Search Efforts ==
After news of Barton's disappearance broke authorities immediately issued a warrant for his arrest. British authorities liaised with Dutch police and other international authorities through established networks, as it was known he was last seen in Amsterdam and had international links. However, nothing was found and Barton remained at large.

In 2006, Operation Captura was launched in an attempt to detain fugitives wanted by UK law enforcement who are hiding in Spain. At the time 50 named fugitives were placed onto the list and 38 of them were arrested after information was given by the public that led to their arrest, none of whom were Barton.

In 2015, as part of Operation Captura, 18 more fugitives' faces, including Barton's, were displayed on a 13 foot high digital screen attached to the back of a van that was driven around Benidorm, Malaga and Puerto Banus. By the end of September 2015, the total number of fugitives apprehended since the operation's launch in 2006 had reached 72 out of 86 featured on the most-wanted list, but Barton was not one of them.

In 2019, a new appeal was released by the National Crime Agency and Crimestoppers, by which point only 11 fugitives still on the original wanted list had not been found.

Since 2019, there has not been another dedicated large-scale media campaign. Barton remains a fugitive as of 2025, the longest wanted fugitive on the National Crime Agency's Most Wanted list.

== See also ==
- List of fugitives from justice who disappeared
