= Killing of Sherry Hart =

1984 murder in Ashe County, North Carolina

- Location of Ashe County within the U.S. state of North Carolina
- Location: Ashe County, North Carolina
- Date: January 15, 1984 (EST)
- Victim: 1
- Perpetrators: Richard Lynn Bare; Jeffrey Scott Burgess
- No. of participants: 2
- Bare escaped custody in 1985 and has not been located since. Burgess was never tried for his role and later died in 2012.

Sherry Elaine Lyall (February 10, 1959 – January 15, 1984; later Sherry Hart) was an American woman who was murdered on January 15, 1984, in Ashe County, North Carolina, United States. Hart was first reported missing by local police as a disappearance.

== Background ==
Sherry Elaine Hart (née Lyall) was a divorcee and the mother of a daughter, April (later April Billings; born 1976 or 1977 depending on information sources).

Sherry was expecting a date on the night of January 15. After being stood up, she joined friends Richard Lynn Bare (b. July 6, 1964) and Jeffrey Scott "Jeff" Burgess (born 1964 or 1965) that Sunday.

After riding along North Carolina Highway 16 that night with Bare and Burgess in Bare's white 1977 Ford Mustang, Hart stated she needed a rest stop. They stopped in a wooded area about a quarter mile from a 2000-foot cliff known informally as "Jumpingoff Place" so that Hart could go to the bathroom. As she returned from the woods, however, Bare caught up with her and started making sexual advances. After Hart continually rebuffed him, Bare became infuriated and slammed Hart with his pistol. Right before getting back into the car, Bare began giving orders for Burgess to drive them to an area on NC 16 near a bar place, almost one quarter-mile from the Blue Ridge Parkway.

Upon reaching this destination, Bare bolted from the Mustang with Hart, the latter bleeding heavily. Bare then told Burgess to drive down the road, come back, and retrieve him later. Later, Burgess told law enforcement that Bare had threatened to kill Burgess and his family if he (Burgess) ever told police what happened. Burgess cooperated with police and law enforcement officials regarding what happened the night of Sunday, January 15, 1984, near the West Jefferson area.

== Discovery of Hart's body and arrest ==
On December 10, 1984, her remains were located at Jumpingoff Place.

Burgess and Bare were arrested three months after the discovery of Hart's body. However, on July 17, 1985, prior to his trial, Bare escaped the jail in Wilkes County. Burgess was taken to the Ashe County Jail. The then-jailer was terminated two days following this incident.

== Later years ==
Richard Lynn Bare was wanted by police and later Federal Bureau of Investigation (FBI) officials. He was shown on the programs America's Most Wanted and Unsolved Mysteries. Bare did not smoke and disliked when anyone next to him did so.

As of June 2026, Bare has not been found or put into custody. Police say he sometimes dresses like a female. In 1993, Bare was almost arrested in Delaware at the home of a relative where he was staying. However, several hours before FBI agents arrived, Bare had left the area.

Burgess was never tried for Hart's killing; he died at age 47 in 2012. Burgess had been in and out of jail on separate drug-related charges and breaking and entering.

April Billings (Lyall Hart's daughter) later married and had three children. As of 2022, she still had optimism that Bare was still alive and being pursued by authorities.

== See also ==
- List of fugitives from justice who disappeared
