= Sylvestro "Pedro" Morales =

Serial Mexican bandit

'Sylvestro "Pedro" Morales'
- Born: Mexico
- Status: never apprehended, now deceased
- Occupation: Outlaw
- Known for: his crimes in California

Sylvestro "Pedro" Morales was a serial Mexican bandit well known for his crimes in California in the 1880s. His "deliberate coolness" when robbing or shooting someone "is probably without a parallel in the whole range of criminal annals" (Daily Alta California).

== Early career ==
Morales was one of the most famous outlaws in Southern California in 1889. In 1881, he shot a Jewish merchant and was sentenced to seven years in the San Quentin Prison. He was released in February 1889. He shot a man at the Almaden quicksilver mine and stole horses. On July 23, he robbed and shot a man and stole his horse, money and watch. On July 24, Marshall Keno Wilson went looking for Sylvestro in order to arrest him. On August 20, Morales had a fight with George Bunch, whom he had previously shot three times in the gut on July 24. This fight happened in the Juan Castro Saloon on the outskirts north of what is now Rancho Santa Fe. The saloon was nearby the ranch of San Dieguito, where there lived an unrelated man named Jose Morales. That afternoon, Sylvestro kidnapped Jose's stepdaughter Nymphia Brown. Jose formed a search party to look for him. On August 24, near San Juan Capistrano, two men from the search party found Sylvestro and Nymphia having a meal at a friend's house. All they got from Morales was a cigarette lighter and his black horse. They were unable to rescue Nymphia and the men left without having any gunshots inflicted on themselves. When the two men later returned, Sylvestro and Nymphia had escaped out the back of the house and hidden themselves in a hill filled with brush. The search party was unsuccessful in finding him.

== Murder of Henry Charles ==
On August 25, 1889, Sylvestro Morales murdered San Juan Capistrano rancher Henry Charles when he went to check the corral. Sylvestro and Nymphia then escaped to the mountains. The killing of Henry Charles brought an increase in the manhunt and reward for Sylvestro. The rewards offered for Sylvestro's arrest were $600 by the estate of Henry Charles, $300 by Robert Waterman and $400 by Jose Morales. Keno Wilson, initially a one-man search effort, increased his party to three when he added Ignacio Castillo, a former member of Sylvestro's gang who Wilson offered immunity from prosecution, and Johnny McGarvin, whose son's discovery of footprints led him to find Morales on a ranch in Los Alamitos Bay.

== Arrest, imprisonment and escape ==
By the time Castillo joined Keno Wilson there were 20 warrants for Morales' arrest and a reward of $1300 total. In early September 1889, Wilson, Castillo and McGarvin carefully spied from a nearby barn for three days until September 6, when they successfully arrested Sylvestro Morales. During her time with Morales, Nymphia had eventually developed a feeling of Stockholm syndrome towards him. She stayed with him due to "constant threats and fear." During his trial, Sylvestro vowed he would get his revenge against Wilson and Castillo. Sylvestro was sentenced to life in San Quentin Prison. However, he was released in 1909 for appearing to have good behavior, which he used as a trick to get out and get his revenge on Wilson and Castillo. He killed Castillo at his ranch house in San Diego on October 14, 1910. Keno Wilson led a large search for Morales in both California and Mexico, but he was never found.

== See also ==
- List of fugitives from justice who disappeared
