= Vernon Henry =

American murder suspect

Vernon Henry (born March 12/13, 1952) is an American murder suspect in the familicide killings in August 1996 of his wife and daughter in the Athol, Idaho residence they shared. Though he hasn't been arrested as of 2025, he is still wanted by local and Idaho State Police and the Federal Bureau of Investigation. According to police, Henry was an anti-government type survivalist who somehow generated money for funding his escape.

== Family background and domestic violence ==
Vernon Henry's wife Connie Marie Henry (1953 or 1954–August 11 or 12, 1996) was under a strong domestic violence situation. Vernon often attacked and verbally abused Connie and her children during their marriage. Among the oldest was Heather Jenee Henry (1978 or 1979–August 11 or 12, 1996). The couple often had major arguments according to the other children at their residence at the time. Police believe that he may have planned the murders ahead of time.

Henry had an intense obsession with fishing and once worked at an upholstery shop in the area.

== Shooting ==
On August 11 or 12, 1996, a heated and violent argument erupted: Connie Marie Henry said she'd had enough of Vernon being controlling and acting violent toward her and the children; she threatened leaving Vernon at that point. This was right after Heather Jenee (age 17 or 18) arrived home from a night with her boyfriend. After around five to eight minutes, Vernon Henry walked angrily to the closet of the residence, grabbed a pistol (or revolver) and fatally shot Connie Marie and Heather to death near the other children. According to the 12 year old son, Henry fled the scene in his red or maroon 1986 Toyota Camry four-door passenger vehicle. The Henry family's then 12-year-old son dialed the 9-1-1 emergency number; a daughter, age seven or eight, woke up after hearing the gunfire. Another daughter, age five, was not awakened by the shots.

== In popular culture ==
Vernon Ray Henry was portrayed starting in 1996 on Fox's criminal catching show America's Most Wanted (then hosted by John Walsh) Season 11 Episode 12 and on Unsolved Mysteries.

== See also ==
- List of fugitives from justice who disappeared
