= Francis Hermans =

English-born American murderer and serial killer

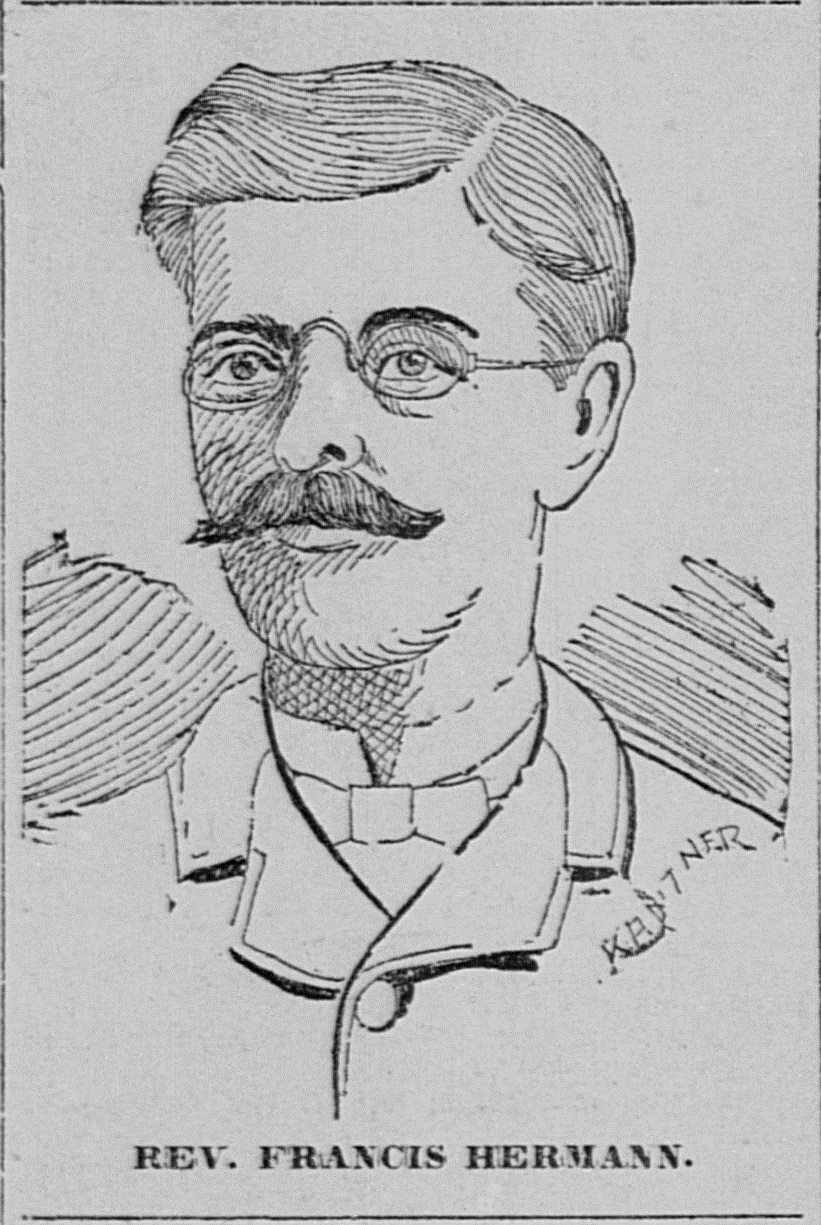
- Contemporary sketch of Francis Hermans
- Born: c. 1851; England
- Died: Unknown
- Other name: "The Priestly Butcher"
- Penalty: Never captured

Details
- Victims: 2–8
- Span of crimes: 1890–1896
- Country: United States, possibly England
- States: Minnesota, Utah
- Date apprehended: Never apprehended
- Imprisoned at: Never captured

Francis Hermans (c. 1851 – after 1896) was an English-born American pastor, murderer and suspected serial killer. After being connected to the murder of two female churchgoers in Salt Lake City, Utah, Hermans fled the city and was never seen again. He is also suspected of murdering ex-wives and two of his children.

== Life in Europe and the American Midwest ==
Francis Hermans was born in England to immigrant parents of either Norwegian or Danish origin. He was well-educated. In London, he worked as a city missionary and married a Ms. Smith, who later died under mysterious circumstances.

Hermans moved to the United States in 1891, first settling in Minneapolis, Minnesota and marrying Bertha Wangen. They were soon living in West Superior, Wisconsin, where Hermans worked as the pastor of the First Norwegian-Danish Methodist Episcopal Church. Bertha's younger sister Caroline lived with the couple. A child was born to Bertha around late December 1891. Around early January, Bertha began exhibiting "spells" of severe mental instability. She was set to be moved into an asylum. Curiously, on January 11, she died under questionable circumstances just hours before her planned departure. Ammonia was found around her mouth; her husband said she had smelled it to calm herself. Her death was thought to be odd, but no investigation was launched at that time. Around the date of Bertha's death, her infant also died. Caroline Wangen continued to live with Hermans after these deaths. She found Hermans "utterly repugnant" and refused his proposal of marriage, but he nevertheless maintained a great deal of control over her. In a choice so controversial it threatened the future of his congregation, Hermans began to date Caroline openly. Some locals claimed this romantic relationship had begun before Bertha's death and had resulted in marital strife.

One year after Bertha's death, Hermans married Miss Martha Lommen of Iowa, with their wedding ceremony being performed in Minneapolis. Despite this marriage, Caroline Wangen remained a part of his life. Eventually an announcement was made that Caroline was moving back to her previous city of St. James, Minnesota. She did not arrive in St. James, and she was never seen again.

Hermans was a respected figure in Scandinavian social circles, and was even a central figure in the Ministers' Association. He and Martha lived in West Superior until the fall of 1893, when they relocated to Salt Lake City, Utah in order to accept a position transfer he had been offered there.

== Life in Utah ==
In Salt Lake City, Hermans served as pastor of the Scandinavian Methodist Episcopal Church. A daughter was born to Martha and Francis on March 25, 1895. The baby died suddenly on April 15, followed by Martha's sudden death three days later. Hermans had taken out a $500 life insurance policy against Martha's life, and he received payment accordingly. Subsequently, he was known to take young ladies driving in his horse-drawn buggy nearly every evening until 11 pm or later, often going with a different young lady each night. Hermans was also known to sometimes drink heavily, and he kept various liquors in his study.

=== Disappearance of Henrietta Clawson ===
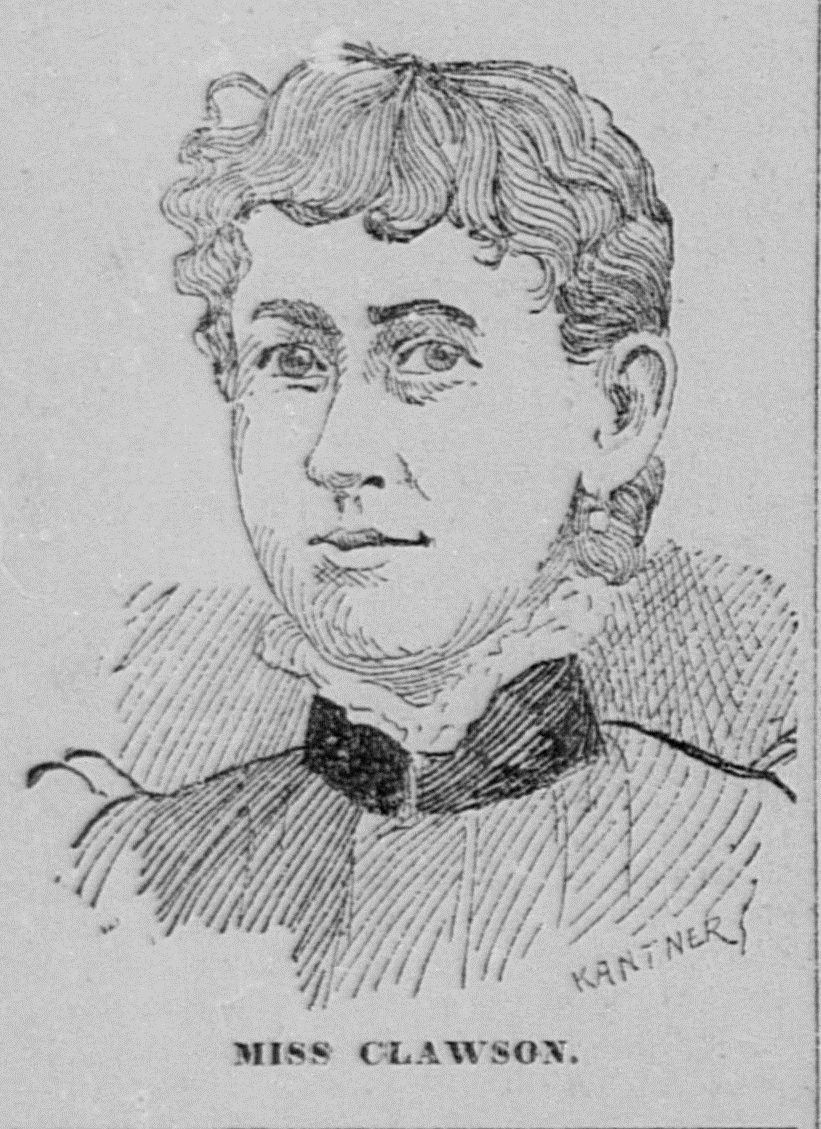
Contemporary sketch of Clawson

A native of Sweden, Henrietta Clawson (or Clauson/Clausen) first arrived to the United States via Denmark in 1887. Having no relatives in the U.S., she settled in with a family named Johnson in Omaha, Nebraska. However, due to an illness, Clawson was brought over to Salt Lake City by Tillie Anderson. Anderson later returned to Omaha, but Clawson decided to remain, maintaining contact with her friends in Omaha through letters. Soon after Hermans arrived in Salt Lake City, her letters frequently contained allusions of their great friendship. Later, it was known in her Salt Lake City social circles that she and Rev. Hermans were engaged to be married.

In September 1895, while Hermans was attending a church conference in the east, the 25-year-old Clawson was hired to look after his parsonage in the church. When he returned in late September, business went on as usual, as did their relationship. During this time, Clawson gave him $300 for safekeeping or investment. A few days after Hermans' return, Clawson had a conversation with Mrs. H. H. Peterson, a woman who lived in an apartment affixed to the north side of the church building. Clawson remarked that she was going to visit a Mrs. Hanson on Center Street before returning to the church in the evening to attend services, and that she would visit a female acquaintance in the country the following day. This conversation with Mrs. Peterson would be the last time Henrietta Clawson was seen alive.

The next morning, Hermans asked the church's janitor, Mr. Johnson, to clean out the basement furnace and prepare it for a fire. The weather was warm, and the furnace hadn't been used since it had caused a blaze several years previously, but the pastor said he wanted to check the flues before cold weather arrived. Johnson took six buckets of coal to the basement and cleaned out the furnace. When he was about to start the fire, he was stopped by Hermans, who took over the project himself. This was just before noon. Hermans was soon running the furnace "full blast." An extremely foul odor emanated along with the fire's heat. During the afternoon, a young man living with his family in one of the apartments attached to the church was overcome by the heat and smell. He fell unconscious and had to be splashed with water in order to come back to his senses. His parents went to the basement to complain, but Hermans declined to shut off the furnace at that time. No one else entered the basement during the test of the furnace, but Mrs. Peterson saw Hermans carrying a large sack into the basement during that time, and others saw him carrying multiple sacks to the basement. Hermans eventually shut off the furnace around 6 pm. During the following months the furnace test would be largely forgotten.

Henrietta Clawson's friends made several inquiries of her whereabouts to the church, and some to Hermans himself, to no avail. The case was highly unusual, as she often contacted them through letters.

Hermans, it would later be discovered, secretly sold Clawson's trunk and personal belongings to a pawnshop on December 11.

=== Disappearance of Annie Samuelson ===
Annie K. Samuelson was employed as a nursery governess in a good family, and had an aunt and other relatives in Salt Lake City. A member of Hermans' church, she left her position in order to work as Hermans' new live-in housekeeper, under the promise of marrying the pastor. During her time as his housekeeper she gave him several sums of money. The pair were sexually intimate, and Samuelson fell pregnant. In November or December 1895, Hermans performed an abortion to eliminate the evidence of their affair.

Samuelson, who was then about 22 years old, was last seen by someone other than Hermans on January 29, 1896. That day, she told her friends that she was going to Ogden, where she was to marry Hermans the following day. She conversed at the church that afternoon with John M. Hansen, telling him that she would be moving away from the Salt Lake City area the next day. She intended to take the train. Hansen offered to set up a place for her to sleep that night in the second story of the church building, which offer she accepted.

Shortly after 9 am on January 30, Hansen saw Hermans at the church. Hermans' hair was uncombed and he appeared sleepy, but he explained his appearance by saying he had gotten up at 4 am in order to take Samuelson to the train station. He told the elderly man that he did not know when she would return. Samuelson, in fact, never did return.

Samuelson's aunt soon received a letter sent from Ogden, dated February 7, and signed with Samuelson's name, explaining that the young lady felt she was not good enough for Hermans and was ending their relationship so he could find a better woman to become his wife. As for her, she was planning to travel to the Chicago home of Fritz Hiddeen. The letter further explained "Hermans has been very good to me. Don't blame him for anything." The handwriting, however, seemed to be that of a man trying to imitate a woman's handwriting.

At some point in late January, the pastor had a large box made at a nearby lumber yard. Later, he sold a watch and ring belonging to Samuelson to a Salt Lake City pawn shop.

Hiddeen, who had previously proposed marriage to Samuelson and had told her that she could come at any time, searched Chicago for her. He was unable to find any evidence to suggest she had ever arrived there.

=== Winter and Spring 1896 ===
Hermans traveled to Butte, Montana on February 18, 1896. To the surprise of Clawson's friends, Hermans wrote them a letter claiming that he had solved the mystery and had seen Ms. Clawson working in a brothel there. While in Montana, Hermans sold another trunk and a quantity of women's clothing. After returning home, he claimed that now that he knew Clawson's whereabouts, he would ship her trunk and belongings to her.

In the spring of 1896, Hermans made a fundraising trip to raise money for the Utah mission. During his absence, the Salt Lake City church's finance records were checked and a "large discrepancy" was discovered. The presiding elder, Rev. Mork of Brigham City, ordered Hermans to return immediately. When confronted about the matter, Hermans confessed to embezzlement, and he was temporarily suspended from his position pending a final decision by the upcoming church conference. Shortly afterward, in early May, Hermans visited his colleague Rev. Ellefson in Ephraim, Utah, making a gift of women's clothing to Mrs. Ellefson. Hermans claimed the clothing had belonged to his wife Martha. He made a similar gift of women's handkerchiefs to the wife of Rev. Mork around the same time. On May 6, Hermans left Utah for Kansas City, Missouri; intending to travel from there to Decorah, Iowa.

=== Discovery of Remains and Evidence ===
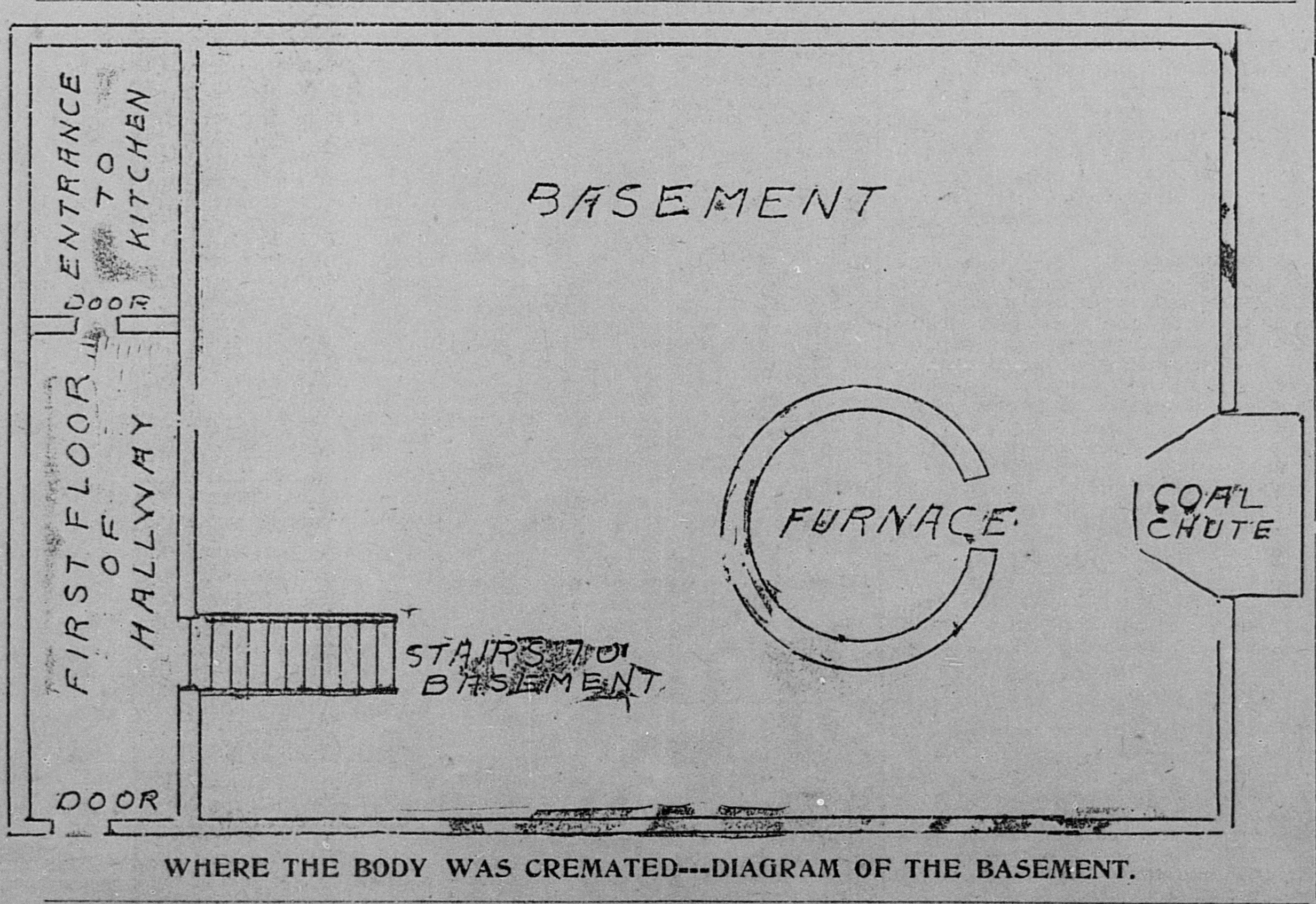
Sketch of the murder scene

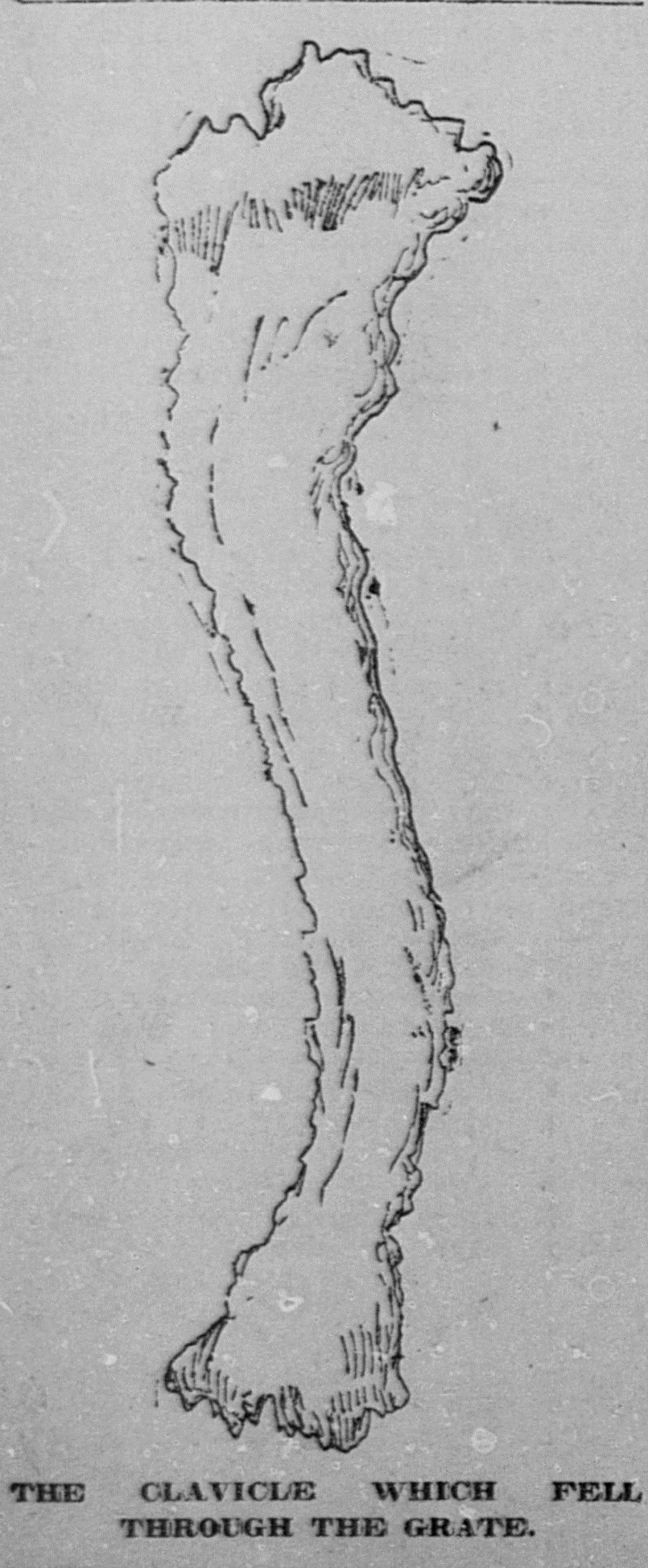
Clavicle bone from the furnace grate

Hermans had asked his friend John Hanson, a Methodist-minister-turned-journalist, to be acting pastor during his absence. Hanson had heard of Clawson's disappearance and harbored a suspicion that "something unusual had befallen the girl." While at the church, Hansen decided to examine the basement. To his surprise, in the furnace he found several items under the grate in the ash receiver: two razors, an English-made butcher knife which Hermans kept in his kitchen, a garter buckle, a belt buckle and, most shockingly, human bones. Upon further examination, he noticed that there was blood on the furnace door, and the buckles were from Clawson's clothing. Authorities were summoned and the bones sent for examination. A box of poisonous drugs was found in Hermans' room.

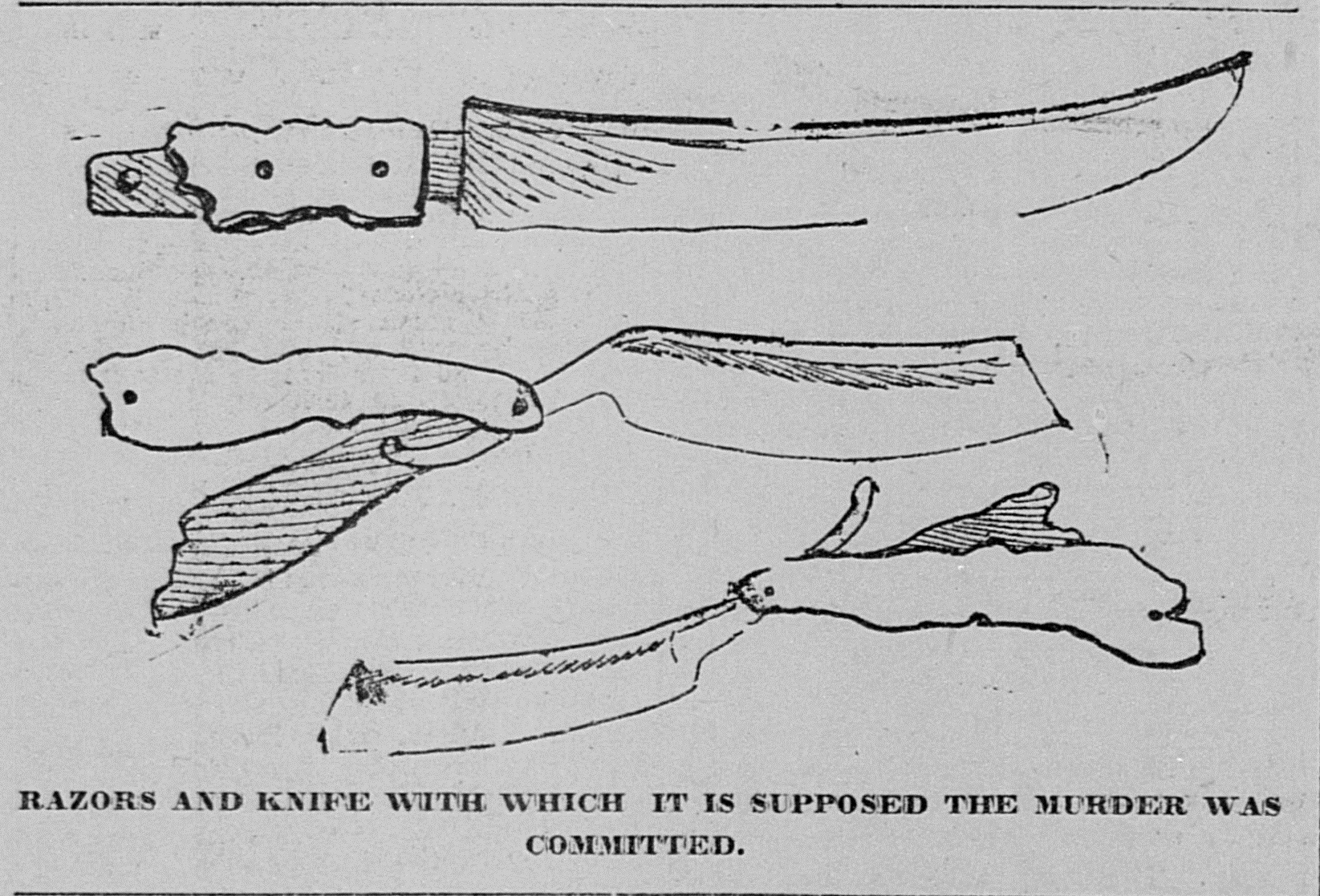
The supposed murder weapons

Local newspapers soon learned of the investigation. Mrs. Peterson, when asked by a newspaper reporter about Hermans' relationship with Clawson, said Clawson "cared a great deal for him." Mrs. Peterson also alleged that Hermans had told her of an indecent proposal Clawson had made toward him. Mrs. Peterson had felt at the time that it was unkind for Hermans to say such a thing about a "good girl" like Clawson.

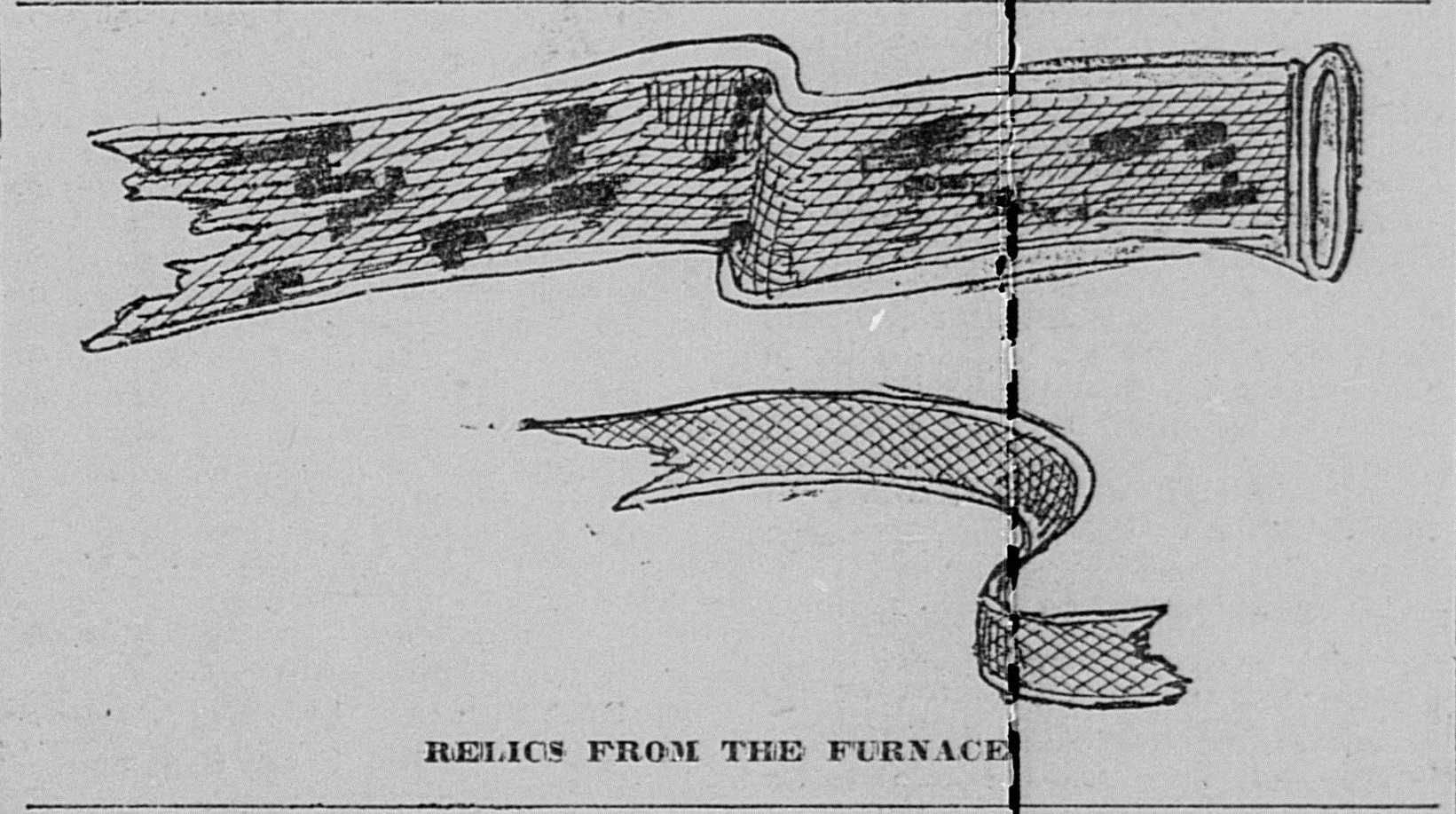
Other pieces of clothing from Clawson

Further inquiries revealed two artificial teeth with metallic rivets among the ashes, identical to the six artificial teeth Dr. Keyser, Clawson's dentist, had previously made for her. Perhaps even more curiously, Clawson's trunk and clothing were found in the pawnshop to which Hermans had sold them, demonstrating that Hermans had never shipped them to her. Not only that, it was learned that Hermans had sold the trunk to the pawnshop himself.

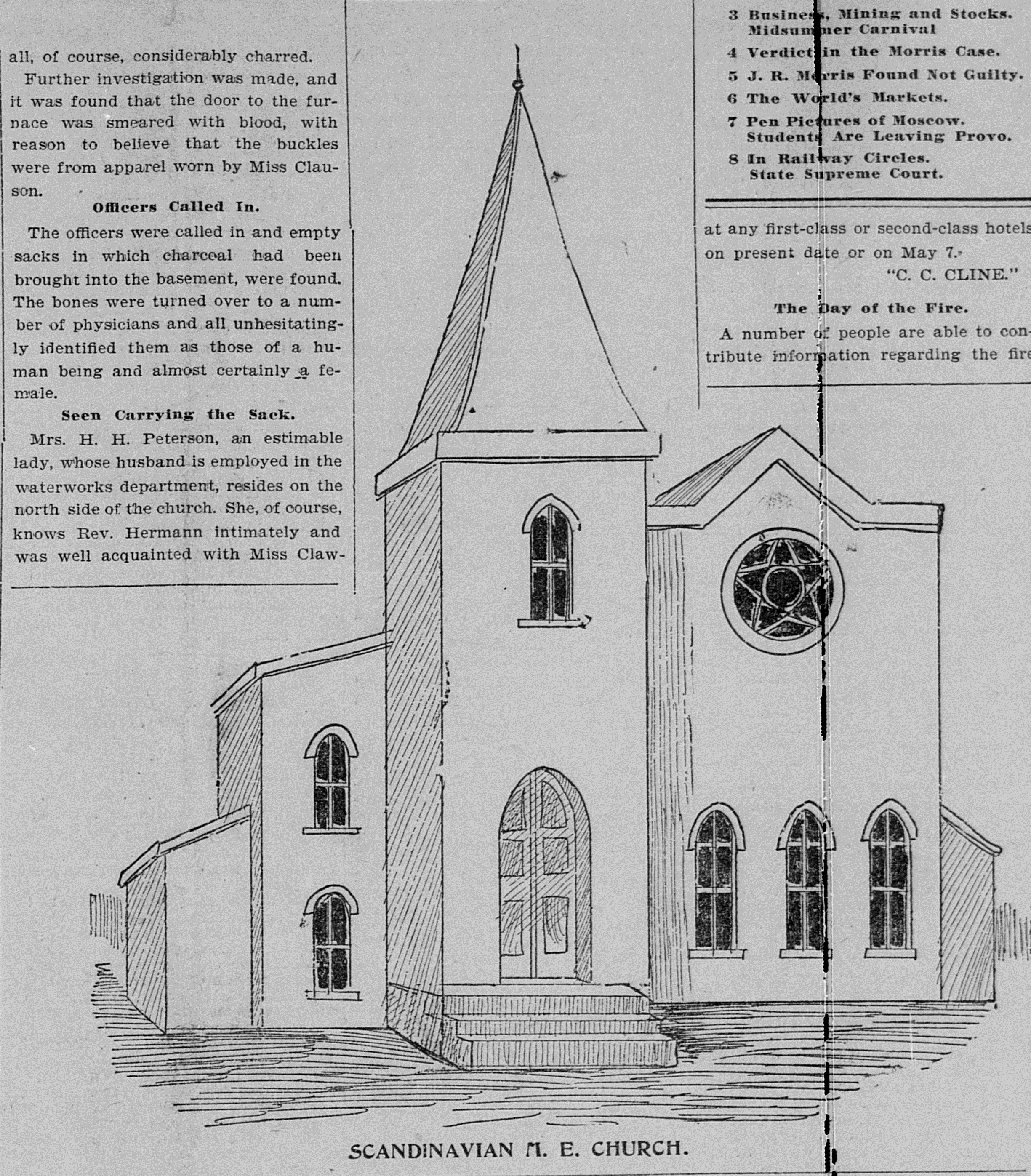
Sketch of the church

A few days after the discovery of Clawson's charred remains, Hermann was also implicated in the disappearance and likely death of Annie Samuelson when a gold ring and watch belonging to Samuelson were found in a pawnbroker's shop, placed by Hermann shortly before his departure to Kansas City. Although it is not entirely clear how Samuelson was killed, taking into account the drugs found in his room as well as his heavy interest in human anatomy and dissection, it is very likely that he poisoned, butchered, and subsequently dismembered Samuelson's body in the church basement before disposing of the remains. Authorities held to the theory that he stored her remains in the box he commissioned a few days before her disappearance, and shipped the box with him to Kansas City.

Despite police searching the church grounds and digging out numerous bones, some of them human, none of the remains were positively identified as those of Samuelson. Hermann's guilt was definitely proven in her murder by two separate letters, written on behalf of Rev. Ellefson and Presiding Elder Mork. According to the letters, the gifts Hermans gave to their wives in early May bore the initials "A. K. S." - those of Annie K. Samuelson, not Martha Lommen Hermans. In addition, Rev. Melby of Butte sent a letter noting Hermans' sale of a trunk and ladies' clothing.

== Escape and sightings ==
Authorities from Decorah, Iowa and Kansas City were unable to locate Hermans, and a reward was announced for his immediate arrest. He was positively traced to a metro in St. Louis, and it was suggested that he was hiding out either in Cincinnati, Ohio or a small town near Indianapolis, Indiana, disguised as a florist.

Over the following year, several people were arrested on suspicion of being Hermans, but were later released when it was proven false. Reports concerning Hermans eventually ceased, and presumably he escaped capture. Those falsely accused of being Hermans included:

- D. M. Elmenberg - On June 1, 1896, George M. Nolan, reported to be either the employee of a Salt Lake City liquor house, or a California wine company, claimed to have travelled along with Hermann two days prior off the Oregon short line, and that the murderer was hiding out in Idaho. Nolan was absolutely positive the man was the pastor, but refused to give any particulars, as he wanted the $500 prize for himself. He was accompanied by Capt. Donovan and Det. Jenney to St. Anthony, where they found the man. He was actually found to be D. M. Elmenberg, a San Francisco native who bore a striking resemblance to Hermans.
- Rev. J. Orris Brown - On June 5, the Rev. J. Orris Brown was arrested in Tennessee on suspicion of being Hermann. He was first detained in Chattanooga and extradited to Cleveland, where it is last reported that he was waiting for a picture of Hermann to arrive in order for identification procedures to continue. No other reports for him exist, suggesting he was released.
- Rev. G. Wynne Richmond - In Topeka, Kansas, Richmond was arrested and was awaiting trial for sending obscene material through the mail. He was accused of being Hermans, which he denied vehemently, and was proven that they are not the same person.
- Unnamed man - In July 1897, a man was arrested in Pembroke, Ontario, Canada on suspicion of being Hermans. A detective from Salt Lake City was sent out to confirm his identity, but ended up exonerating the man, saying that a mistake had been made.

== List of suspected victims ==
- Ms. Smith, his first wife - died under suspicious circumstances prior to his 1891 arrival in America.
- Bertha Wangen, his second wife - died mysteriously on January 11, 1892.
- Bertha Wangen's infant - died around the same time as Bertha.
- Caroline Wangen, his sister-in-law - mysteriously disappeared in the spring of 1892.
- Hermans' newborn daughter by Martha Lommen - died suddenly on April 15, 1895.
- Martha Lommen, his third wife - died under suspicious circumstances on April 18, 1895.
- Henrietta Clawson, his housekeeper - disappeared in September 1895.
- Annie Samuelson, his housekeeper - disappeared in January 1896.

== See also ==
- H. H. Holmes
- List of fugitives from justice who disappeared
- Theodore Durrant

General:

- List of serial killers in the United States
