= Adam Emery =

American fugitive

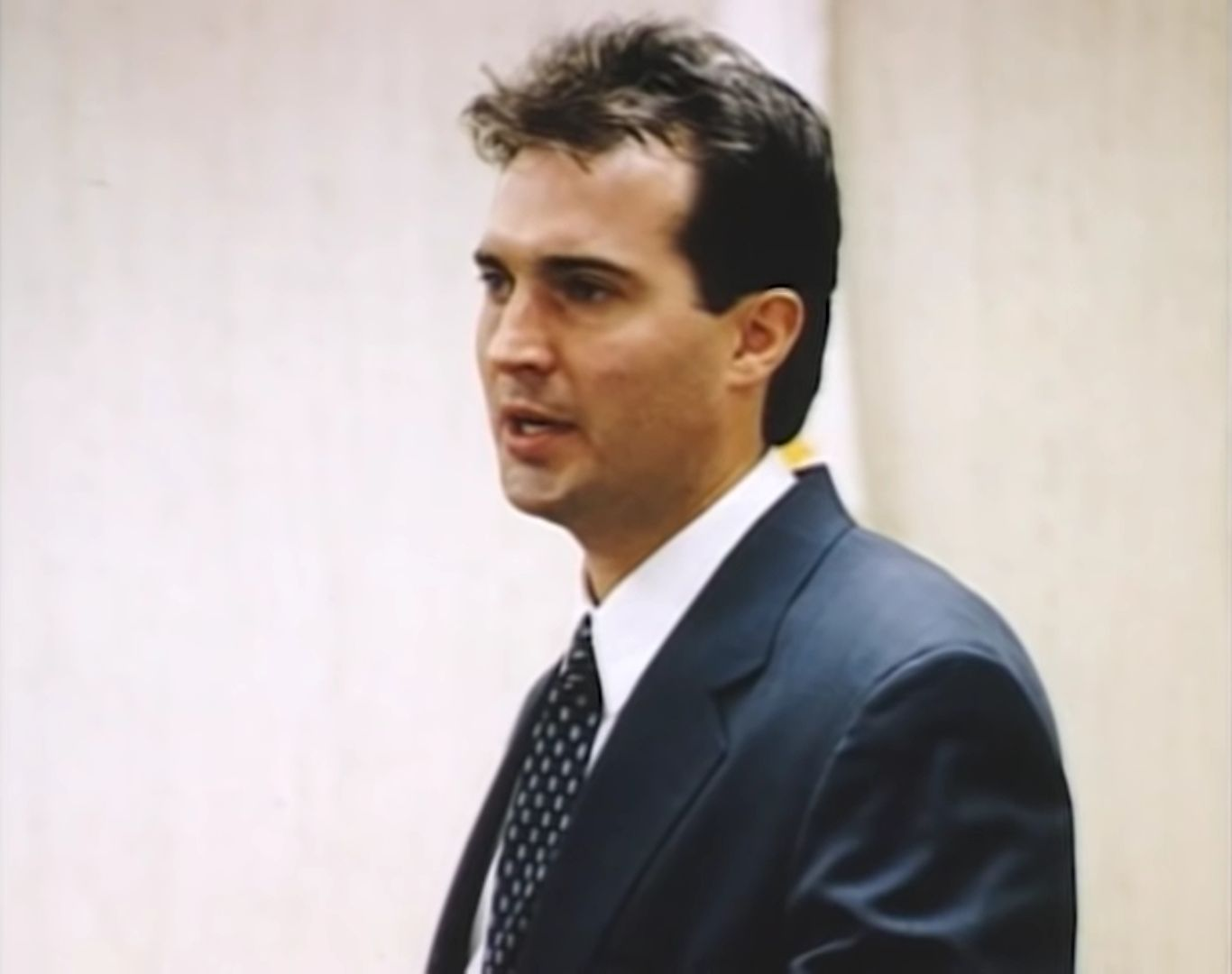
- Emery c. 1991
- Born: Adam C. Emery; November 10, 1962; Warwick, Rhode Island
- Disappeared: November 10, 1993; Narragansett Bay, Rhode Island
- Status: Missing for 32 years, 10 months and 25 days
- Occupations: Purchasing agent and worker in a plastics company
- Spouse: Elena L. DiRocco Emery
- Conviction: Second-degree murder
- Criminal charges: Murder; Unlawful flight to avoid prosecution

Adam C. Emery (born November 10, 1962, disappeared November 10, 1993, declared dead 2004) was an American fugitive. On November 10, 1993, he was convicted of second-degree murder in the death of a twenty-year-old man in a road rage incident in Rhode Island. Before formal sentencing, Emery disappeared from the Claiborne Pell Newport Bridge just hours after being released on bail. He was declared legally dead in 2004.

== Murder of Jason Bass and disappearance ==
On the evening of August 31, 1990, Adam Emery's 1985 Ford Thunderbird was sideswiped by a passing vehicle while he and his wife, Elena, were at a Rocky Point restaurant with another couple. Enraged, Emery mistakenly chased down the wrong car, and stabbed the driver to death with a military knife. The murdered driver was twenty-year-old Jason Bass. Bass’ passenger was his cousin, 20-year-old Joshua Post, who owned the 1977 Ford LTD II they were driving in. Emery was subsequently released on bail after spending 8 months in jail while his lawyer negotiated putting up money and property as bail. Emery was offered a plea deal in exchange for lesser charges of Voluntary Manslaughter and a prison term of five to seven years, but he refused to accept the deal, insisting that the killing was in self defense. Analysis conducted using paint chips from both vehicles determined that someone else had hit Emery.

On November 10, 1993, Emery was convicted of second-degree murder, and was to await formal sentencing. Emery was facing up to 25 years in prison for the murder, but hadn't been formally sentenced. Emery was released on bail once again, and subsequently disappeared hours later, along with his wife; they both mailed suicide notes, and their car was found abandoned on the Claiborne Pell Newport Bridge. Prior to their disappearance, the couple were last seen at a Burger King and purchasing wearable exercise weights at the Kelly's Sporting Goods store in Cranston, Rhode Island. In 1994, a skull later identified as Elena's was found in the Narragansett Bay below the Newport Bridge the same day, coincidentally, the houses put up as Adam Emery's bail were being repossessed.

In 2004, Emery was declared legally dead; however, there have been multiple sightings of him and in 2010, the FBI placed him on their most wanted list. They believe Emery may have travelled to Florida or Italy and have stated they have "no reason" to believe Emery is dead.

== Sightings ==
Numerous sightings of Emery were reported in Connecticut in the month following his disappearance, but Emery was still legally free, and thus could not be considered a fugitive. The day before Emery's scheduled formal sentencing, the FBI received a tip that Emery may have fled to Florida. The sightings after this followed geographic patterns, starting in Florida, and then later France and Italy. The FBI believes Emery is most likely in Italy, as he has family there. The FBI has worked with Italian authorities regarding these sightings, but none have led to any conclusions. In 2019, the FBI said that there was a "significant chance" that Emery would be tracked down within the next five years.

== In the media ==
Emery was profiled on television programs Unsolved Mysteries and America's Most Wanted.

== See also ==
- List of fugitives from justice who disappeared
