= Fawzi Mutlaq al-Rawi =

Iraqi politician (1940–2021)

- فوزي مطلق الراوي

Alleged Leader of the Iraqi Regional Command of the Arab Socialist Ba'ath Party
- In office 2003–2021
- National Secretary: Abdullah al-Ahmar
- Preceded by: ?
- Succeeded by: Mouteb Shenan

Personal details
- Born: 1940 Falluja, Dulaim, Kingdom of Iraq
- Died: 28 June 2021 (aged 80–81) Damascus, Syria
- Citizenship: Iraqi
- Party: Arab Socialist Ba'ath Party
- Nickname(s): Fawzi Isma'il al-Husayni al-Rawi; Abu Akram; Abu Firas

Fawzi Mutlaq al-Rawi (Arabic: فوزي مطلق الراوي, 1940 – 28 June 2021), also known by his aliases as Abu Akram or Abu Firas, was an Iraqi politician who was allegedly, according to the US, the leader of the Syrian-led Ba'athist movement in Iraq.

== Early life ==
Fawzi Mutlaq al-Rawi was born in 1940 in Falluja in the governorate of Dulaim, Iraq.

== Iraq War ==
According to the US Treasury, Rawi was appointed to his position as Chairman of the Iraqi branch of the Syrian led Ba'ath movement by Syrian President Bashar al-Assad in 2003. In 2006 Rawi was number 13 of the Iraqi government's 41 most wanted, accused of funding and leading terrorist operations in Anbar province.

In late 2007 the US Treasury designated Rawi on the accusation of providing financial and material support to al-Qaeda in Iraq. The US Treasury Department also accused Rawi of being supported by the Syrian government and having close ties to Syrian intelligence agencies. Rawi was accused of having twice met with a former commander of the Ba'athist militant group Jaysh Muhammad in 2004, and having told the commander that the group would receive material support from the Syrian government. According to the US Treasury Rawi in 2005 helped transfer $300,000 to members of al-Qaeda in Iraq, alongside vehicle borne IED's, rifles, and suicide bombers. Rawi also allegedly discussed operational issues with representatives of the al-Qaeda leadership in Iraq, such as attacks against the US Embassy and within the Green Zone. However, these allegations were never confirmed and Rawi hasn't been heard from since the Iraq War.

In a meeting with Iraqi Prime Minister Nour al-Maliki in January 2009, David Petraeus, Commander of United States Central Command, called Rawi one of the more dangerous members of the insurgency linked with the former Ba'athist government, although also downplayed the risk posed by such groups when compared to that posed by al-Qaeda in Iraq.

Despite claims by the US Treasury that Rawi was the leader of the Syrian led Ba'athist movement in Iraq, the UN as well as Al-Sabah reported that Mohammed Younis al-Ahmed was elected to lead the party in Syria. Rawi is never mentioned in either report.

According to the U.S. as of 2010, Rawi was allegedly believed to be living in a Syrian government-owned apartment in the Mezzeh neighborhood of Damascus, and working out of the Syrian Ba'ath Party Command Building in the al-Halbuni District of the city.

Rawi died in Damascus on 28 June 2021.

== See also ==
- List of fugitives from justice who disappeared
