= Michel Barrera =

American criminal (born 1980)

Michel Barrera (born March 1980) is an American fugitive wanted for bank robbery, attempted murder of law enforcement officers, and shooting at the police during a high speed chase. He is also wanted for questioning by police in the murder of Randi Gorenberg in 2007. The crimes for which Barrera is wanted took place in the Miami metropolitan area of South Florida.

== Crimes ==
In February 1998, Michel Barrera robbed a bank with an accomplice. They robbed the bank of just over $20,000 (equivalent to $38,583 in 2024).

Three months later, on May 1, 1998, Barrera and his accomplice drove to the National Republic Bank in Miami. The two men exited the stolen car and entered the bank. After the robbery was over, the two men got into the stolen vehicle. A police officer then started following them. Barrera fired a shotgun multiple times at the officer. Later that day, Barrera and his accomplice ditched the stolen car; they then stole another vehicle from a man.

The accomplice in the bank robbery was arrested by Miami-Dade police. Barrera, though, managed to evade police. He later disappeared.

Almost nine years later in March 2007, a 52-year-old woman, Randi Gorenberg, was kidnapped not long after leaving the Town Center Mall in Boca Raton, Florida on the afternoon of Friday, March 23. The abductor drove Gorenberg to the South County Civic Center, shot her and tossed her body from the passenger side of her Mercedes SUV. At the time of the Gorenberg murder, Barrera owned a four door Chrysler 300. An informant told the PBSO that gang members might have assisted in the Gorenberg killing.

== Later years ==
Barrera became a person of interest after Randi Gorenberg was killed. He was featured on the show America's Most Wanted multiple times. Barrera was also associated with the MS-13 street gang.

== See also ==
- List of fugitives from justice who disappeared
