= Moses Ehrich =

American businessman and fugitive

Old Unger
- Born: Moses Ehrich; United States
- Disappeared: 1875 (aged 24–25); New York City, New York
- Status: Disappeared prior to capture, never apprehended, now deceased
- Occupation: Shopkeeper
- Known for: Bowery fence and underworld figure.

Moses Ehrich (fl. 1850–1875) was an American businessman and underworld figure known as Old Unger who served as a fence to burglars, thieves and shoplifters from his Eldridge Street store. He was indicted four or five times on charges of receiving stolen goods during the administration of New York City Mayor A. Oakey Hall, but never convicted. He was represented by Hall in later years.

== Disappearance ==
In 1875, Ehrich was indicted for his involvement in the Adams Express safe robbery and accused of receiving stolen bonds and an uncut diamond valued at $800. Released on a $5,000 bond, he disappeared from the city shortly after the conviction of ringleader Daniel Haurey. In spite of efforts by District Attorney Horace Russell and the New York Police Department, he left for Canada.

== See also ==
- List of fugitives from justice who disappeared
