= Jack York =

Canadian slave

- Born: Western District
- Disappeared: September 1800; Quebec
- Status: Never caught; now deceased

Jack York (fl. 1800) was a Canadian slave in the Western District who was alleged to have raped a white woman named Ruth Tufflemier after breaking into her cabin. York was arrested in August 1800. He was then tried for burglary, not rape; the trial took place on 12 September 1800, before Justice William Dummer Powell. York was found guilty and sentenced to death, but the sentence was never carried out. York eventually escaped and disappeared. York was never captured or seen again.

== See also ==
- List of fugitives from justice who disappeared

== Books ==
- Fraser, Robert Lochiel III (1979). "York, Jack". In Halpenny, Francess G. (ed.). Dictionary of Canadian Biography. Vol. IV (1771–1800) (online ed.). University of Toronto Press.
