= Pharmacy Maniac =

Russian murderer

Details
- Victims: 2
- Span of crimes: May – August 2011
- Country: Russia
- State: Chelyabinsk
- Date apprehended: N/A

The Pharmacy Maniac is an unidentified Russian murderer who killed two men in Chelyabinsk in 2011, both of them in pharmacies. He remains uncaptured, and his motives have not been fully established.

== Murders ==
Second murder

=== First murder ===
The offender committed his first murder on 26 May 2011. Wearing a medical mask, glasses, and a hat, the perpetrator walked into a Klassika pharmacy at 34 Lenina Prospekt in the Chelyabinsk city center. In his hands, he carried a sawed-off shotgun and a black cellophane bag. At the time the perpetrator entered the pharmacy, there were a total of eight people present – four employees and four customers. He proceeded to demand valuables from those in the pharmacy, stating "I need 60 thousand rubles. Put the money in, whoever doesn't want to, can move away, [but] I will shoot [them] in the stomach." Later, two more women went into the pharmacy, and the robber ordered them to give him their jewelry and step aside. The women gave the perpetrator gold chains, a bracelet, a ring, a cross, and a church pendant. While this was happening, some people were able to escape the pharmacy from an exit in another room. Then, Vladamir Shin, a 49-year-old man, entered the pharmacy to buy medicine. Seeing the robbery in progress, Shin attempted to run out the front door. The offender yelled "Stop" and fatally shot Shin in the chest. The assailant then fled the scene.

=== Second murder ===
On 10 August 2011, the offender walked into another Klassika pharmacy – 500 meters away from the first attack – at 5:30 pm. Upon entering, he shot Igor Ustinov, 30. Visitors of the pharmacy ran into another room and huddled in a corner. Without stealing anything, the perpetrator then went outside to reload his gun. After his gun was reloaded, the perpetrator once again entered the pharmacy. Walking past the wounded Ustinov, the attacker asked "Where is he?" The offender then walked back to Ustinov and shot him in the head several times. According to witnesses, the perpetrator then said "It's your fault," or "It's all your fault, white coats." Satisfied that the victim was dead, he put his gun into his cellophane bag and left.

== Investigation ==
Both victims were shot with the same weapon. The offender committed attacks only in shops belonging to the Klassika chain. According to witnesses, the perpetrator looked ridiculous, behaved uncertainly, and often expressed himself in phrases used by stereotypical American soldiers. His appearance did not make a positive impression on anyone.

After panic ensued after the second murder, the Chelyabinsk police began working even more diligently. The network of Klassika pharmacies was taken under special jurisdiction, and the facial composite of the alleged killer was posted on public transport, shops, and large office buildings. For any information leading to his capture, a reward of 1,000,000 rubles was assigned. The inability of the police to catch the maniac has caused widespread criticism of the Chelyabinsk law enforcement system in the mass media.

There is an assumption by some that the killer has bipolar disorder, but conclusions from experts at the regional psychoneurological hospital, who created his offender profile, claim the opposite. Psychiatrists believe he had a mercenary motive, but due to a lack of experience, the killer left the crime scene before taking much money or valuables. The Pharmacy Maniac did, however, prepare for his crimes in advance. The offender remains unapprehended, his motives remain unclear, and suspects are lacking. Cases of "imitators" have also been recorded. Attempts to mathematically calculate the maniac's actions have led to nothing. In 2016, the investigation intensified, with an active search for suspects again being conducted.

== In the media ==
In the first season of the television series "Karpov" (2013), the 29th episode titled Others is based on the Pharmacy Maniac.

== See also ==
- List of fugitives from justice who disappeared
