= John Ruffo =

Former business executive, white-collar criminal and con man (born 1954)

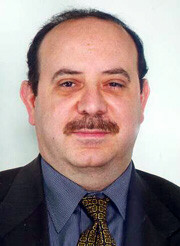
- Photograph taken in 1997
- Born: November 26, 1954 (age 71); Brooklyn, New York City, U.S.
- Disappeared: November 9, 1998 (aged 43); JFK Airport, New York City, U.S.
- Status: Missing for 27 years, 10 months and 26 days
- Other names: Jack Nitz; Bruce Gregory; John Peters; Charles Sanders
- Occupation: Former business executive
- Employer: Consolidated Computer Services (CCS)
- Known for: Wanted by the United States Marshals Service for bank fraud
- Height: 5 ft 6 in (1.68 m)
- Status: at-large
- Allegiance: "Project Star"; Edward J. Reiners
- Criminal charges: Bank fraud; Money laundering; Wire fraud; Conspiracy
- Penalty: 17 years in prison
- Reward amount: $25,000
- Capture status: Fugitive
- Wanted by: United States Marshals Service
- Wanted since: November 1998
- Time at large: 27 years, 10 months and 26 days
- Comments: currently on the U.S. Marshals 15 Most Wanted Fugitives list

John Ruffo (born November 26, 1954) is an American former business executive, white-collar criminal and con man, who in 1998 was convicted in a scheme to defraud many US and foreign banking institutions of over 350 million US dollars. The swindle is considered one of the most significant cases of bank fraud in US history. He has been a fugitive from justice ever since, and is on the U.S. Marshals 15 Most Wanted Fugitives list as of 29 August 2024.

Ruffo was the President of CCS, an IBM equipment reseller in New York City, in 1996.

== Early life ==
Ruffo was born to a close-knit Italian American family in a working class neighborhood in Brooklyn. He attended New York University on a scholarship, earning a degree in computer science. In May 1980, he married his childhood sweetheart, Linda. Ruffo initially worked for United Computer Systems LLC in New York, before eventually branching out to form his own firm, Consolidated Computer Services (CCS).

== Criminal case ==
Ruffo became acquainted with and befriended another prominent New York businessman, Edward J. Reiners, formerly an executive with Philip Morris USA. After Reiners was laid off, he approached Ruffo with an idea in 1992. The scheme involved soliciting various banks in an attempt to secure financing for a fictitious "Project Star". They pitched the project to bank executives as a top secret operation for Phillip Morris to develop smokeless cigarettes. Ruffo's company, CCS, was to provide the computer hardware and consulting for five offices set up to work on the project. They leveraged Reiners' prior credentials as a Phillip Morris executive to forge documents and add authenticity to the scheme. They also included stringent confidentiality agreements stipulating that because of the sensitivity of the project, banks were to deal only with Reiners and to never contact Phillip Morris directly.

Ruffo tried to avoid suspicion by making timely interest payments on the loans. However, in 1996 a bank executive at the Long-Term Credit Bank of Japan noticed an irregularity on one of the forged documents. After he contacted Phillip Morris and then the FBI, the scheme began to unravel. Reiners was arrested by FBI agents who set up a sting operation on March 19, 1996, and an arrest warrant was issued for Ruffo two weeks later. All told the scheme generated over US $350 million in secured loans (equivalent to $718 million in 2025), although much of it was squandered on poor stock market speculation and exorbitant spending by the conspirators. US$21 million (equivalent to $43 million in 2025) was, however, never accounted for by federal authorities.

Ruffo faced a 150-count indictment charging him with bank fraud, money laundering, wire fraud, and conspiracy. His bail was set at an unusually high $10 million as he was considered a flight risk. As nearly all of Ruffo's known assets and accounts were frozen by the FBI, most of his immediate family put up their homes as collateral to secure his pre-trial release. Ruffo was found guilty on all counts and was sentenced to 17 years in prison.

== Fugitive ==
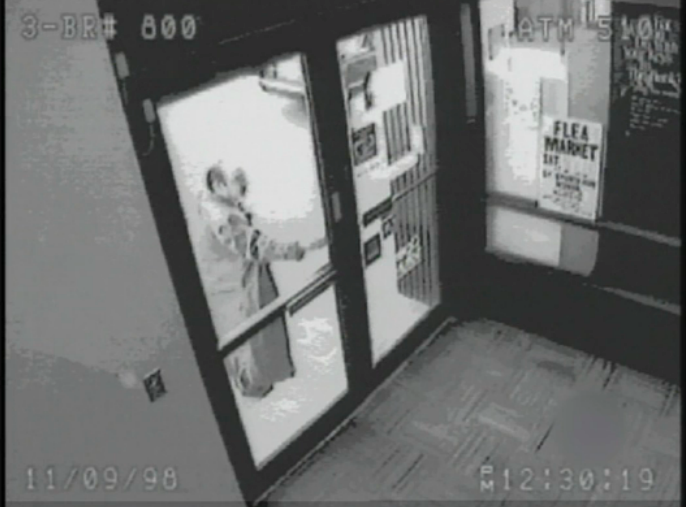
November 1998 surveillance image of Ruffo

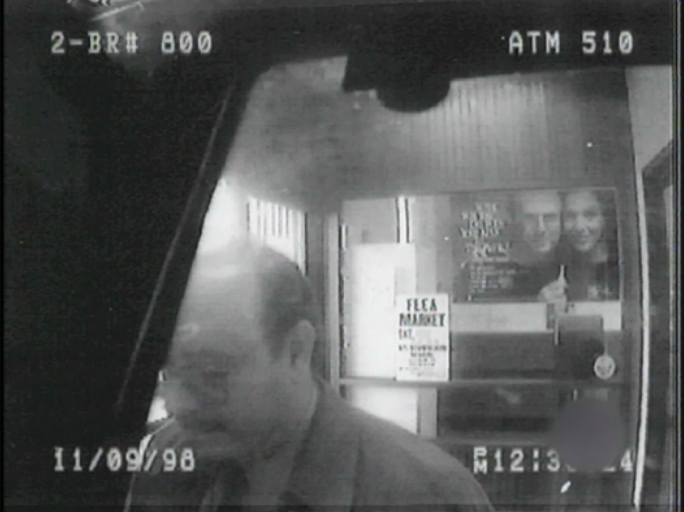
November 1998 surveillance image of Ruffo

On November 9, 1998, Ruffo failed to turn himself over to the U.S. Marshals Service to begin serving his sentence. His image was captured on CCTV cameras taking money out of an ATM (pictured) on the afternoon he was to report, but he has not been seen nor heard from since. In his wife's last communication with him on the morning of his disappearance, he told her he was meeting with a parole officer but never returned. His car was later recovered by the FBI abandoned at JFK Airport. Three months after Ruffo's disappearance, the homes of his wife, mother, mother-in-law, and others were seized by the government as a forfeiture of bond collateral, effectively making them all homeless.

In April 2001, Ruffo was sighted in Duncan, Oklahoma, apparently visiting several community banks in an attempt to open an account so he could receive US$250 million of wire transfers from Nigeria. Police were called to a motel in Duncan where Ruffo was staying, but when authorities went to capture him, Ruffo had already left town. Later that year, his wife Linda filed for divorce, citing spousal abandonment, which was granted by the court.

Authorities believe Ruffo still has access to substantial overseas financial resources, which could be aiding him in his ability to stay off-the-grid and assume a new identity. Chief Deputy US Marshal John Bolen commented in 2013, "Having been sentenced to 220 months of incarceration and not serving a single day of that kind of sticks in the craw of those of us in this profession. His actions are a mockery to our justice system. We are the best in the world at this. He just has to make one mistake. We can make many but he just has to make one. We'll catch him". Ruffo's last attorney, Jeffery Lichtman, offered the following when asked if he thought authorities would ever capture his former client: "I think if I had to be a betting man, I'd put my money on John Ruffo. Because from what I can see so far, he is smarter than the people looking for him."

Ruffo's cousin, Carmine Pascale, believed that he spotted Ruffo in the stands in Dodger Stadium while watching a Los Angeles Dodgers game on television on August 5, 2016. He froze his screen and contacted police. With the help of the Dodgers, police found the seat number and tracked down the ticket holder. However, the holder had given the ticket away. It had changed hands many times and the man who attended the game could not be found. After months of no new leads, police made the information publicly available in October 2021. An image of the man suspected of being Ruffo was released shortly afterwards. Investigator Danielle Shimchick said that the person in the image closely resembles Ruffo, and Pascale remained convinced that it was him. After the image was released, law enforcement received a tip and were able to track down the man seen in the images. Through fingerprints and a swift background check, they confirmed the man seen at the game was not Ruffo.

Ruffo remains at large. The U.S. Marshals Service is offering a $25,000 reward for information that leads to his capture.

== See also ==
- Financial crimes
- List of fugitives from justice who disappeared
- Taylor, Bean & Whitaker, former top tier mortgage firm who ceased all operations in 2009 due to bank fraud and financial crimes.
