= Killing of Jamie Meah =

2023 crime in Leeds, England

- Location: Armley, Leeds
- Date: March 31, 2023
- Target: Jamie Meah
- Attack type: Stabbing
- Weapon: Sword
- Perpetrators: 4
- Motive: Gang-related conflict
- Charges: 15 years imprisonment
- Verdict: Not Guilty (Attempted Murder, Murder) Guilty (Manslaughter, GBH, Possession of a bladed article)

On 31 March 2023, Jamie Meah, 18, was dragged out of a taxi and stabbed in Armley, Leeds, England, and a 16-year-old boy was also seriously injured in the attack. Three suspects – Caleb Awe, Aquade Jeffers and Enham Nishat, all 20 – are believed to have fled the UK shortly after the incident. A fourth suspect, Ranei Wilks, 23, was jailed for 15 years after being convicted of manslaughter.

== Background ==
Jamie Meah was born in 2004 in Leeds, West Yorkshire. According to evidence later heard in court, Meah had become involved in low-level drug activity in the months leading up to the incident. He was in a relationship at the time of his death, and his partner was pregnant with their son who was born later that year.

== Attack ==
On the evening of March 31, 2023, Meah had taken a taxi to various locations in Leeds to allegedly deal drugs with a 16-year-old (who was not named) before arriving at Hall Lane in Armley, at its junction with Brooklyn Terrace. Meah was then dragged from the taxi by a drugs gang who had been waiting in a parked Mercedes with a three-to-four-foot sword, with which Meah was then stabbed multiple times. During this attack a stab wound to his leg had severed the femoral artery. The four suspects then fled the scene. Meah was able to get to a property on Brentwood Street where he told the occupier that he needed an ambulance, after which he collapsed unconscious. He died only a few minutes later despite attempts to resuscitate him.

A post-mortem examination carried out after his death found Jamie had suffered a wound to his right hip, one to his right thigh, which had severed an artery and caused a "catastrophic haemorrhage" that led to his death, a stab wound to his calf, a cut to his lower leg and a small abrasion to his neck.

The 16-year-old victim was able to flee to a nearby fish and chip shop, as despite multiple lacerations, his injuries were not life-threatening.

== Investigation and trial ==
All four suspects initially fled the country directly after the attack. Enquiries showed they had initially travelled to Liverpool before travelling on a ferry from Fishguard in Wales to Rosslare under false names. They were also later arrested for a petty theft on 4 May 2023, but were released as Gardai had no knowledge that all four were wanted for murder. However, Wilks gave himself up to authorities and returned to the UK one year and one month after the attack. He was arrested at Leeds Bradford Airport after flying back from Turkey in April 2024. He was tried on January 6 2025 after which he was acquitted of murder and attempted murder after jurors deliberated for 13 hours and 30 minutes. Wilks was however found guilty of manslaughter, GBH with intent and two counts of possession of a bladed article and was sentenced to 15 years in prison. This sentence was seen as overly lenient and the sentence was referred to the Attorney General under the Unduly Lenient Sentence scheme.

The three other suspects were named as Caleb Awe, Aquade Jeffers and Enham Nishat, all 20. They were last definitively seen on CCTV in Liverpool shortly after March 31, 2023, the day Meah was murdered in Leeds. As of 2026, all three are still on the run.

== Aftermath ==
After news of the attack broke the local community was extremely shocked and angered. The incident had been the second fatal stabbing in the Armley area within weeks. Senior Investigating Officer, Detective Chief Inspector Lee Townley of West Yorkshire Police's Homicide and Major Enquiry Team said: "Extensive enquiries are being carried out in relation to this murder investigation, our thoughts remain with the victim who has lost his life as a result of a violent attack on the streets of Leeds. We are working to establish the full circumstances surrounding this incident." Many took to Facebook to express shock and anger.

On the 31st March 2025 a fresh appeal was made to mark the two year anniversary of the attack. In a statement released to mark two years since Jamie’s death, his family said: “It is now the second anniversary of Jamie’s murder and there are still three people who are wanted. Our pain and distress will continue until all those responsible face justice."
