= Aarni Neuvonen =

Estonian criminal

- Born: Vadim Rozenberg
- Disappeared: 9 February 1993
- Status: Declared dead in absentia
- Other names: Aarni Rozenberg, Vadim Petrov, Daniil Rosenberg
- Known for: Alleged to be the largest ever perpetrator of employment fraud in Estonia and having caused over an estimated 10 million of EEK of damages in 1993.

Aarni Neuvonen (born 1953/4), a pseudonym of Vadim Rozenberg, also known under the aliases Aarni Rozenberg and Vadim Petrov, is alleged to be the largest ever perpetrator of employment fraud in Estonia. He is alleged to have collected money with the promise of overseas jobs from thousands of people, before disappearing in 1993 after having caused more than an estimated 10 million EEK of damages.

== Scheme ==
Neuvonen published large and eye-catching adverts in mostly Russian-language newspapers on behalf of Inter Work Corporation, supposedly established in the 1930s and headquartered in Jerusalem and Bangkok, offering jobs in hotels, pubs, and factories in South America, Arabia, and Europe. Job-seekers were charged 2335 EEK in advance fees; the fee was supposed to cover costs of a "foreign passport" (a Soviet-era practice long since gone from Estonia), a visa, airline tickets, and Estonian income tax. At that time, the average salary in Estonia was about 1070 EEK, and due to the aftermath of the crash of the GOSPLAN-governed Soviet economy, joblessness was around 17%. (GOSPLAN's focus was in the military-industrial plants in Northern Estonia, staffed primarily by Russophone migrants.)

Neuvonen is also alleged to have spread rumours that the first batch of jobs, supposedly scheduled to start working in Germany at Kodak plants, had already been fulfilled — thus implying that the number of jobs was limited, and enticing victims to bribe Neuvonen with US$100 (about 1200 EEK at the time) fee to increase their positions in the queue.

Neuvonen announced that the visas, air tickets, and job permits would be handed over on 23 March 1993 in the banquet hall of the Viru Hotel. However, Neuvonen's office, opened on 10 January 1993, was closed already on 9 February 1993, and documents presented by the jobseekers were found in a bin next to the office's door.

== Investigation ==
One of the company's supposed office addresses was on wasteland, and the other only held an electricity transmission substation — both places unsuitable for offices. Furthermore, three of the people supposedly investing in the company through its incorporation agreement did not exist.

Police estimated that at least 3,000 people paid Neuvonen the 2,335 EEK of advance fees; some analysts have speculated there were up to 5,000 victims. After closure of the office, only 32,000 EEK was recovered from one of the company's bank accounts.

He had previously been imprisoned for fraud in Russia and Latvia.

=== Sightings ===
In 1993, Neuvonen, then using the alias Daniil Rosenberg, was reported to be advertising little-used American and Japanese cars for 1000 USD on Ukrainian TV, defrauding hundreds of people out of an estimated million USD.

In 1994, Neuvonen, then presenting himself as a citizen of Norway, was reported to be offering jobs in Europe to poor people in Bulgaria, defrauding about 400 people out of an estimated million USD.

=== Status ===
Neuvonen was never arrested, and was declared dead due to disappearance by an Estonian court at the request of his wife of hurried marriage, to whom he had fraudulently sold an apartment on Lasnamäe.

== See also ==
- List of fugitives from justice who disappeared
