= FBI Ten Most Wanted Fugitives, 2020s =

FBI Ten Most Wanted List

The seal of the FBI

The FBI's Ten Most Wanted Fugitives during the 2020s is a list, maintained for an eighth decade, of the Ten Most Wanted Fugitives of the United States Federal Bureau of Investigation. At any given time, the FBI is actively searching for 12,000 fugitives. As of October 20, 2026, twenty-one new fugitives have been added to the list.

== FBI Ten Most Wanted Fugitives to begin the 2020s ==
The modern header with blue border used by the FBI on top Ten Fugitive wanted posters since at least 2002, on both the FBI internet web site and in public presentations of the wanted posters.

The FBI in the past has identified individuals by the sequence number in which each individual has appeared on the list. Some individuals have even appeared twice, and often a sequence number was permanently assigned to an individual suspect who was soon caught, captured, or simply removed, before his or her appearance could be published on the publicly released list. In those cases, the public would see only gaps in the number sequence reported by the FBI. For convenient reference, the wanted suspect's sequence number and date of entry on the FBI list appear below, whenever possible.

The following fugitives made up the top Ten list to begin the 2020s:

Name	Sequence Number	Date of Entry	Notes
Robert William Fisher	#475	2002	• Still at large but removed from the list. • Wanted for the murder of his wife and their two children in Scottsdale, Arizona, on April 10, 2001. • He was removed from the list on November 3, 2021, for no longer meeting the list criteria.
Alexis Flores	#487	2007	• Removed from the list but later captured. • Wanted for kidnapping and killing a 5-year-old girl in Philadelphia, Pennsylvania. • He was removed from the list on March 6, 2025, for no longer meeting the list criteria. • Arrested on February 11, 2026, in Honduras.
Jason Derek Brown	#489	2007	• Still at large but removed from the list. • Allegedly killed an armored car guard in Phoenix, Arizona, during a bank robbery. • He was removed from the list on September 7, 2022, for no longer meeting the list criteria.
Yaser Abdel Said	#504	2014	• Captured. • Wanted for the murders of his two teenage daughters. The girls died of multiple gunshot wounds on January 1, 2008, in Irving, Texas. • Arrested on August 26, 2020, in Justin, Texas.
Bhadreshkumar Chetanbhai Patel	#514	2017	• Still at large. • Wanted for the April 2015 murder of his wife at a Dunkin' Donuts shop in Hanover, Maryland.
Santiago Villalba Mederos	#515	2017	• Captured. • Wanted for his involvement in several crimes committed in Tacoma, Washington. He allegedly fired multiple shots into a random car, killing a 20-year-old woman and seriously wounding her brother. In a separate incident he allegedly fired a single gunshot towards bystanders, striking and killing an innocent male victim. • Arrested on June 5, 2020, in Tenancingo, Mexico.
Alejandro Castillo	#516	2017	• Captured. • Wanted for his alleged involvement in the murder of a co-worker in Charlotte, North Carolina. The victim's body was located in a wooded area with a gunshot wound to the head. • Arrested on January 16, 2026, in Pachuca, Mexico.
Rafael Caro Quintero	#518	2018	• Captured. • Wanted for his involvement in the kidnapping and murder of Drug Enforcement Administration Special Agent Kiki Camarena in 1985. Additionally, he allegedly held an active key leadership position directing the activities of the Sinaloa Cartel and the Caro-Quintero Drug Trafficking Organization, one of the former's subsidiaries. • Arrested on July 15, 2022, in Choix Municipality, Sinaloa, Mexico.
Arnoldo Jimenez	#522	2019	• Captured. • Wanted for allegedly murdering his wife less than 24 hours after marrying her. • Arrested on January 30, 2025, in Monterrey, Mexico.
Eugene Palmer	#523	2019	• Still at large but removed from the list. • Wanted for allegedly killing his daughter-in-law outside her home in Stony Point, New York. • He was removed from the list on July 20, 2022, for no longer meeting the list criteria.

== FBI Ten Most Wanted Fugitives added during the 2020s ==
It was not until June 2020 before any of the previous fugitives were captured. A second fugitive was caught in August 2020, and the first replacement was named in October 2020. Despite being captured in August 2020, the second fugitive was not replaced until September 2021. No fugitive was captured in 2024. The minimum reward for information leading to a Ten Most Wanted Fugitive's arrest was increased from $100,000 to $250,000 on May 25, 2023.

The list includes (in FBI list appearance sequence order):

=== 2020–present ===
Name	Sequence Number	Date of Entry	Time Listed
Jose Rodolfo Villarreal-Hernandez	#524	October 13, 2020	Two years
Jose Rodolfo Villarreal-Hernandez was wanted for the stalking and conspiracy to commit murder-for-hire of a 43-year-old male victim on May 22, 2013, in Southlake, Texas. He is also believed to be responsible for a number of murders in Mexico. He was captured in Atizapán de Zaragoza on January 7, 2023.
Octaviano Juarez-Corro	#525	September 8, 2021	Five months
Octaviano Juarez-Corro was wanted for the murder of two people in Milwaukee's South Shore Park on Memorial Day, 2006. His wife suffered two gunshot wounds to the chest, but survived. Two others were injured, with one being hurt gravely. He was captured in Zapopan, Jalisco, Mexico, on February 3, 2022.
Yulan Adonay Archaga Carias	#526	November 3, 2021	Still at large
Yulan Adonay Archaga Carias is wanted for his activities as the alleged leader of MS-13 in Honduras. He is allegedly responsible for supplying MS-13 groups in Central America and the United States with cash, narcotics, and guns, as well as ordering and participating in murders committed by the gang. He was charged in the Southern District of New York with racketeering conspiracy, cocaine importation conspiracy, and possession and conspiracy to possess machine guns. The reward for information leading to his capture was increased to $5 million on February 8, 2023.
Ruja Ignatova	#527	June 30, 2022	Still at large
Ruja Ignatova is wanted for her alleged leadership of OneCoin, a massive cryptocurrency fraud scheme.
Omar Alexander Cardenas	#528	July 20, 2022	Still at large
Omar Alexander Cardenas is wanted for his alleged involvement in the murder of a man outside a barbershop in Los Angeles, California, in the summer of 2019.
Michael James Pratt	#529	September 7, 2022	Three months
Michael James Pratt was wanted for his alleged involvement in sex trafficking and the production of child pornography as owner of pornography website GirlsDoPorn. He was captured in Madrid, Spain, on December 21, 2022.
Wilver Villegas-Palomino	#530	April 14, 2023	Still at large
Wilver Villegas-Palomino is wanted for drug-trafficking activities for the National Liberation Army (ELN) Northeastern War Front in the Catatumbo region of Colombia and Venezuela.
Donald Eugene Fields II	#531	May 25, 2023	Twenty months
Donald Eugene Fields II was wanted for his alleged involvement in child sex trafficking in Missouri between 2013 and 2017. He was captured in Lady Lake, Florida, on January 25, 2025.
Vitel'Homme Innocent	#532	November 15, 2023	Still at large but removed from the list
Vitel'Homme Innocent, a Haitian national and leader of the Kraze Barye gang, is wanted for his role in the kidnappings of U.S. citizens and the murder of a U.S. citizen who was killed in a botched kidnapping for ransom scheme. The crimes occurred in Port-au-Prince, Haiti. He was removed from the list on July 1, 2025, for no longer meeting the list criteria.
Fausto Isidro Meza Flores	#533	February 4, 2025	One year, nine months
Fausto Isidro Meza Flores was wanted for drug trafficking violations and for allegedly conspiring to manufacture and distribute cocaine, heroin, methamphetamine, and marijuana in the United States from 2005 to 2019. He was captured in a joint U.S.-Mexican operation in Guasave, Sinaloa, Mexico on November 20, 2026.
Francisco Javier Roman-Bardales	#534	February 21, 2025	24 days
Francisco Javier Roman-Bardales was wanted for his alleged contributions to MS-13 in the United States, Mexico, and El Salvador and being an alleged leader of the gang. Also, he ordered many violent acts against civilians and rival gang members, drug selling, and extortion in El Salvador and the United States. On March 17, 2025, he was captured in Teocelo, Veracruz, Mexico.
Ryan James Wedding	#535	March 6, 2025	Ten months
Ryan James Wedding was wanted for allegedly running a drug trafficking network that shipped hundreds of kilograms of cocaine from Colombia to Canada and the United States. He also has allegedly orchestrated multiple murders in furtherance of these drug crimes. He was captured in Mexico City, Mexico, on January 22, 2026.
Giovanni Vicente Mosquera Serrano	#536	June 24, 2025	Still at large
Giovanni Vicente Mosquera Serrano, an alleged senior leader of Tren de Aragua—a violent transnational gang and designated foreign terrorist organization that originated in Venezuela—is wanted for providing material support to a foreign terrorist organization, as well as for conspiracy and cocaine distribution in Colombia intended for distribution in the United States.
Cindy Rodriguez Singh	#537	July 1, 2025	50 days
Cindy Rodriguez Singh was wanted for the alleged murder of her five-year-old son Noel, who disappeared in Tarrant County, Texas, in October 2022. On August 20, 2025, she was captured in New Delhi, India.
Samuel Ramirez Jr.	#538	March 10, 2026	1 hour, 13 minutes
Samuel Ramirez Jr. was wanted for his alleged involvement in the murders of two female victims on May 21, 2023, at the Stars Bar and Grill in Federal Way, Washington. He fled to Arizona and was later driven into Mexico after the killings. Ramirez was captured in Culiacán, Mexico just over an hour after being added to the Most Wanted list.
Trung Duc Lu	#539	March 11, 2026	Still at large
Trung Duc Lu is wanted in connection with the August 2014 torture, kidnapping, and murder of two Vietnamese brothers who had been engaged in drug dealing in Philadelphia, Pennsylvania. A third male was also tortured and kidnapped, but managed to survive the attack.
Anibal Alexander Canelon Aguirre	#540	March 12, 2026	Seven months
Anibal Alexander Canelon Aguirre is wanted for allegedly leading a large international conspiracy that deploys numerous crews to the United States to steal millions of dollars from financial institutions in support of Tren de Aragua. Canelon Aguirre and other members of the conspiracy are alleged to have unlawfully enriched themselves by committing ATM jackpotting, a scheme where malware is installed on ATMs to force the unauthorized withdrawal of cash, after which the stolen cash flows through a complex money laundering network. He was captured at sea and transferred to the United States on October 2, 2026.
KaShawn Nicola Roper	#541	April 14, 2026	1 day
KaShawn Nicola Roper was wanted for her alleged involvement in a shooting on August 23, 2020, in Kansas City, Missouri. During an altercation, it is alleged that Roper fired multiple shots at a car which struck two female victims, resulting in the death of one of them. She was captured in High Springs, Florida, on April 15, 2026.
Gregory Henderson Jr.	#542	August 11, 2026	1 day
Photograph of Henderson taken in 2023 Gregory Henderson Jr. was wanted for international drug trafficking and dog fighting in Central Indiana. Henderson's drug-trafficking network was believed to be distributing methamphetamine, cocaine, and fentanyl throughout the Midwest. Henderson was the alleged leader of a violent gang operating in Indianapolis, Indiana, which had also allegedly engaged in a dog-fighting criminal enterprise that resulted in the severe abuse and deaths of numerous dogs. He was captured on August 12, 2026, in Louin, Mississippi.
Satinderjeet Singh	#543	September 28, 2026	Still at large
Satinderjeet Singh is wanted for his alleged involvement in the Lawrence Bishnoi Organized Crime Group which is allegedly engaged in a variety of violent acts in Southern California, and across the United States and Canada. These acts include assassinations of political and religious figures, shootings, murders, kidnappings, extortions, assaults, and the trafficking of narcotics and weapons. Singh is based in the United States and is the alleged leader of the Group in North America.
Joseph Matos	#544	October 20, 2026	Still at large
Joseph Matos is wanted for his alleged involvement in the murder of a National Guard member in the Belmont Cragin neighborhood of Chicago, Illinois, on July 3, 2021. Matos is believed to be a member of the Milwaukee Kings street gang, a criminal organization whose members and associates have engaged in narcotics trafficking and committed acts of violence, including murder and assault, to acquire and preserve the gang’s perceived territory on the North Side of Chicago, Illinois.

== FBI directors in the 2020s ==
- Christopher A. Wray (2017–2025)
- Paul Abbate (2025)
- Brian Driscoll (2025)
- Kash Patel (2025–present)
