= Fausto Isidro Meza Flores =

Mexican drug trafficker

- Undated photograph

FBI Ten Most Wanted Fugitive
- Charges: Conspiracy to Manufacture and Distribute Five Hundred Grams or More of Methamphetamine, Distribute Five Kilograms or More of Cocaine, Distribute One Kilogram or More of Heroin, and Distribute One Thousand Kilograms or More of Marijuana for Importation into the United States; Use and Possession of a Firearm
- Reward: $5,000,000
- Alias: El Chapo Isidro

Description
- Born: June 19, 1982 (age 44); Navojoa, Sonora, Mexico
- Race: White|Mestizo (Hispanic)
- Gender: Male
- Height: 5 ft 6 in (168 cm)
- Weight: 160 lb (73 kg)

Status
- Added: February 4, 2025
- Caught: November 20, 2026
- Number: 533
- Captured

Fausto Isidro Meza Flores (born June 19, 1982), also known as "El Chapo Isidro", is a Mexican drug lord and leader of Los Mazatlecos. He held a high rank in the Beltrán Leyva Cartel and was the right-hand man of Alfredo Beltrán Leyva before Beltrán Leyva was incarcerated in the United States. On February 4, 2025, he was added to the FBI Ten Most Wanted Fugitives list. He was captured during a Mexican military operation in Guasave on November 20, 2026, sparking retaliatory cartel violence in the area.

== Criminal career ==
=== Early life and ascension ===
Meza Flores (known in the criminal world as El Chapo Isidro) was born on June 19, 1982, in Navojoa, Sonora, Mexico. He began his criminal career in the 1990s, at first working for the Juárez Cartel under the tutelage of the then-leader Amado Carrillo Fuentes. After the drug lord died of plastic surgery complications in 1997, Meza Flores deserted the organization along with several other drug traffickers and decided to join the forces of the Sinaloa Cartel, under the Beltrán Leyva brothers, who also left the Juarez Cartel after the death of Carrillo Fuentes. As a member of the Beltrán Leyva faction, he proved to be a "skilled hitman, capable of daring, cunning and bravado." When the leader Arturo Beltrán Leyva was gunned down and killed by the Mexican military in December 2009, many within the cartel deserted and left to form an independent criminal organization with Edgar Valdez Villarreal, known as La Barbie. Meza Flores, however, remained loyal to the Beltrán Leyva brothers and possibly forged an alliance with Vicente Carrillo Fuentes.

=== Tubutama, Sonora shooting ===
A fierce gunfight between members of the Sinaloa Cartel (with the backing of Gente Nueva) and the Beltrán Leyva Cartel (with the support of Los Zetas and Los Mazatlecos Meza Flores' men) left about 30 dead in the town of Tubutama, Sonora, in northern Mexico, on July 1, 2010. The drug gangs clashed just a few miles across the international border from the U.S. state of Arizona – an area notorious for being a smuggling route for narcotics and human trafficking. Reportedly, Meza Flores and a drug trafficker called Arnoldo del Cid Buelna (known in the criminal world as El Gilo) were the ones that carried out the surprise ambush attack on the gunmen of the Sinaloa Cartel. Eleven late-model, bullet-ridden vehicles were found at the scene, along with dozens of assault rifles. Some of the vehicles had "X" painted on their windows, a method often used by the Mexican drug trafficking organizations to distinguish their vehicles from those of rival drug cartels during armed confrontations.

=== Los Mazatlecos era ===
His gang, Los Mazatlecos, is based in the region of Guasave, Los Mochis, Mazatlán, in Sinaloa, and Nayarit and is responsible for smuggling large quantities of methamphetamine, heroin, marijuana, and cocaine since 2000. He is one of the principal leaders of the Beltrán Leyva Cartel in the city of Mazatlán and in the mountainous areas of Sinaloa state. Since 2010, he has been one of the leading rivals of the Sinaloa Cartel; the fight between the two drug trafficking groups has generated a wave of kidnappings and executions in Sinaloa. Meza Flores was the right-hand man of Héctor Beltrán Leyva (now deceased), the top leader of the Beltrán Leyva Cartel; his area of operations is in Mazatlán, Guamúchil, Los Mochis, Choix and Los Cabos. On April 28, 2010, Meza Flores was nearly captured by Mexican law enforcement in the mountains of Choix, Sinaloa. However, the operation left two soldiers dead and twelve of his gunmen killed, including his right-hand man Omar Alfonso Rubio (alias "El Chonte"). On December 12, 2013, one of Meza Flores's top lieutenants, Ignacio "Nacho" González, was arrested in Guasave, Sinaloa, by the Mexican Army.

== Capture ==
Meza Flores was wanted by the United States government on drug trafficking charges. The U.S. Department of State's Narcotics Rewards Program offered a reward of up to $5,000,000 for information leading to his capture. His last known residence was in the state of Nuevo León, where he was reportedly seen with some of his family members at a youth basketball game in San Pedro Garza García on January 19, 2013. On February 4, 2025, he was added to the FBI Ten Most Wanted Fugitives list. He was the 533rd fugitive to be placed on the list, replacing Donald Eugene Fields II, who was wanted for child sex trafficking charges.

On November 20, 2026, Meza Flores was arrested alongside seven others, including his alleged second-in-command and a financial operator from the Beltrán-Leyva Organization, during a Mexican special forces operation in Guasave with intelligence support from the Joint Interagency Task Force-Counter Cartel. During the operation, Mexican soldiers were attacked by armed civilians with explosives and firearms, but still managed to enter the house where Meza Flores and his aides were located. At least four soldiers and seven cartel members were killed during the shootout.

In response, cartel members set up at least 10 roadblocks in nearby towns and attacked security personnel in Guasave, while gunfire forced the evacuation of Kuroda Park during a baseball game. Several businesses and vehicles were set afire. The military deployed helicopters and drones to the area, some of which opened fire. Due to the violence, Meza Flores was not extracted until 4 a.m. the following day, when he was taken to Mexico City aboard a Mexican Air Force aircraft. Upon arrival, he was transferred to the Specialized Prosecutor's Office for Organized Crime (SEIDO).

== Kingpin Act sanction ==
The Office of Foreign Assets Control (OFAC) of the United States Department of the Treasury announced on January 17, 2013, that they froze the assets of Meza Flores, seven of his family members, and three companies that had connections with his criminal organization through the Foreign Narcotics Kingpin Designation Act (sometimes referred to simply as the "Kingpin Act").

Businesses included in the sanction

Name	Registration #	Type	Location	Citations
Autotransportes Terrestres S.A. de C.V.	N/A	Automobile	Guasave, Sinaloa	
Auto Servicio Jatziry S.A. de C.V.	12577	Gas station	Guasave, Sinaloa	
Constructora Jatziry de Guasave S.A. de CV.	13554	Construction	Guasave, Sinaloa	

Family members of Meza Flores

Name	Alias	Birth	Status	Relationship	Citations
Fausto Isidro Meza Angulo	N/A	March 27, 1962	Fugitive	Father	
Angelina Flores Apodaca	N/A	July 21, 1958	Fugitive	Mother	
Araceli Chan Inzuna	N/A	February 8, 1985	Fugitive	Wife	
Flor Angely Meza	N/A	September 20, 1989	Fugitive	Sister	
Pánfilo Flores Apodaca	El Charmin	June 1, 1969	Arrested	Uncle	
Samuel Flores Apodaca	El Pelón	October 23, 1962	Fugitive	Uncle	
Agustín Flores Apodaca	El Niño	June 6, 1964	Arrested	Uncle	

== See also ==
- List of fugitives from justice who disappeared
- Mexican drug war
