= Vitel'Homme Innocent =

Haitian gang leader (born 1986)

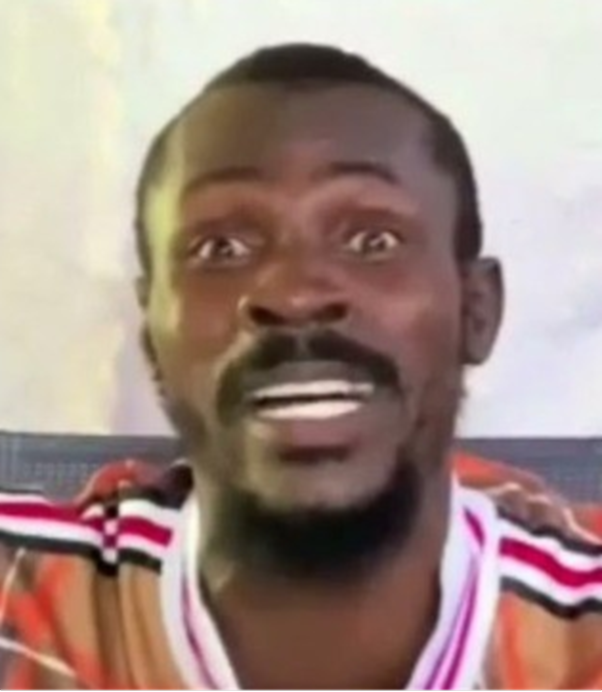
- Undated photograph of Innocent

FBI Ten Most Wanted Fugitive
- Charges: Conspiracy to commit hostage taking; Hostage taking; Conspiracy to commit hostage taking resulting in death; Attempted hostage taking resulting in death
- Reward: US$2,000,000

Description
- Born: March 27, 1986 (age 40); Haiti
- Nationality: Haitian
- Race: Black
- Gender: Male
- Height: 5 ft 7 in (170 cm) – 10 in (178 cm)
- Weight: 150 lb (68 kg)

Status
- Added: November 15, 2023
- Removed: July 1, 2025
- Number: 532
- Removed from Top Ten Fugitive List

FBI photo of Vitel'Homme Innocent

Vitel'Homme Innocent (French pronunciation: [vitɛlɔm inɔsɑ̃]; born March 27, 1986) is a Haitian gang leader who was added to the FBI Ten Most Wanted Fugitives list on November 15, 2023, for his role in the 2021 Haitian missionary kidnappings. A reward of up to 2 million US dollars was offered for information leading to his capture. On July 1, 2025, Innocent was removed from the FBI Ten Most Wanted Fugitives list after it was determined that he no longer fit the list criteria.

== Biography ==
Innocent was born on March 27, 1986, in Haiti. Originally a political activist, he still maintains ties to grassroots political movements in Haiti. In a 2024 interview with CNN, he described himself as a former small business owner and stated that his "dream is to get rid of the oligarchs who prevent [Haiti] from progressing".

Innocent is the leader of the Kraze Baryé gang, which as of May 2024, participated in the Viv Ansanm alliance of Haitian gangs. The alliance also includes the Revolutionary Forces of the G9 Family and Allies and 400 Mawozo. Since at least July 2021, Innocent has had an agreement with Joly "Yonyon" Germine, senior leader of the 400 Mawozo gang, to work cooperatively in the Croix-des-Bouquets area.

On October 24, 2023, Innocent was charged with ordering the October 2022 kidnapping of an American couple which left the woman, Marie Odette Franklin, dead. In January 2023, he killed four police officers in Pétion-Ville. He is accused of the 2021 Haitian missionary kidnappings.

On November 15, 2023, Innocent was added to the FBI's Ten Most Wanted Fugitives list, replacing Jose Rodolfo Villarreal-Hernandez, a cartel lord wanted for orchestrating the murder of a Texas lawyer. Innocent was the 532nd fugitive to be placed on the FBI's Ten Most Wanted Fugitives list. In a 2024 interview, he expressed willingness to defend himself in a US court.

On December 8, both the United States and the United Nations Security Council placed Innocent on their respective economic sanctions lists. On January 20, 2024, the European Union also placed sanctions on Innocent.

On July 1, 2025, Innocent was removed from the FBI Ten Most Wanted Fugitives list after it was determined that he no longer fit the list criteria. He was replaced by Cindy Rodriguez Singh.

On May 16, 2025, Joly Germine was convicted of the Christian kidnapping case. He was sentenced to life in prison for the crime on December 3.

== See also ==
- Gang war in Haiti
- Haitian crisis
- Jimmy Chérizier
