= Los Mazatlecos =

Criminal organization in northwestern Mexico

- Founded by: Alfredo Beltran Leyva (Incarcerated)
- Founding location: Mazatlán, Sinaloa, Mexico
- Years active: 2000–present
- Territory: Sinaloa, Sonora, Durango, Nayarit
- Ethnicity: Mexican
- Activities: Drug trafficking, murder, kidnapping, extortion
- Allies: Cártel del Noreste; La Mayiza (Sinaloa Cartel splinter)
- Rivals: Los Chapitos; Cártel de Jalisco Nueva Generación; Los Ántrax; Gulf Cartel; Juarez Cartel

Los Mazatlecos (English: “The Mazatlan people”), also known as the Guasave Cartel, is a Mexican criminal organization, based in Guasave, Sinaloa. The cartel is primarily involved in drug trafficking, particularly methamphetamine and fentanyl.

The cartel was formerly an enforcer gang of the Beltrán Leyva Cartel, but has operated as an independent entity, led by Fausto Isidro Meza Flores (“El Chapo Isidro”), since 2013.

== History ==
=== Founding and alliance to the Beltrán-Leyva Organization ===
Los Mazatlecos was formed in 2000 by Beltrán-Leyva Organization (BLO) leader Alfredo Beltrán Leyva ("El Mochomo") in the coastal city of Mazatlán, Sinaloa, from where they take their name. Initially, the gang was under the command of Fausto Isidro Meza Flores (“El Chapo Isidro”), and pledged its loyal to Alfredo until he was arrested by Mexican authorities on January 20, 2008. The arrest, blamed on Sinaloa Cartel leader Joaquin Guzman Loera ("El Chapo"), would result in the BLO and Sinaloa Cartel breaking up their previous alliance and engaging in a turf war; Los Mazatlecos would continue their allegiance with the BLO.

After Alfredo’s arrest, as well as the death of his brother and incumbent BLO leader Arturo Beltrán Leyva in a shootout with the Mexican Marines on December 19, 2009, Los Mazatlecos shifted their alliance to Alfredo's other brother Héctor Beltrán Leyva, who assumed control of the Beltrán Leyva Cartel.

=== Autonomous operation under Beltrán-Leyva Organization ===
As the BLO continued to decline throughout the late 2000s and 2010s due to the arrests or deaths of many of its leaders, Los Mazatlecos began to increasingly operate in their own right under the leadership of Meza Flores, while continuing to engage in the turf war against the Sinaloa Cartel. This war, beginning with battles in the Choix municipality of Sinaloa in April and May of 2012, continuing with battles in El Fuerte in July, and further fueled by the alleged defection of a Mesa Flores associate to the Sinaloa Cartel, was considered by Mexican authorities to be responsible for a four-times increase in deaths and kidnappings in the states of Sinaloa and Durango during this period.

=== Formation as an independent cartel ===
By January 2013, the United States Department of the Treasury recognized Meza Flores’ organization as an independent Drug-Trafficking Organization (DTO), referring to it as the “Mesa Flores DTO”. The Mesa Flores DTO was alleged to be based in the city of Guasave, Sinaloa, from where they take their subsequent name.

The Guasave Cartel is known to be based in the cities of Guasave and Ahome, Sinaloa, with connections to other cities in northwestern Mexico. It primarily smuggles fentanyl, methamphetamines, heroin, and marijuana into the United States, and is believe to also smuggle drugs into Asia. The Guasave Cartel maintains a lower profile than most other Mexican cartels by preferring to make agreements with other cartels in the region.

Between July 10 and 11, 2014, multiple elements of the Mexican Armed Forces killed a total of 12 gunmen in the cities of Guasava and Sinaloa de Leyva; Sinaloa state officials claimed that all gunmen were members of Los Mazatlecos.

In December 2024, Mexican security forces seized over one ton of fentanyl pills in Ahome, Sinaloa, one of the largest seizures of this kind to date. In 2025, Meza Flores was placed on the FBI Ten Most Wanted Fugitives list, currently the only criminal from Mexico on the list. During the infighting in the Sinaloa Cartel, Los Mazatlecos began to ally itself with the La Mayiza faction led by Ismael Zambada Sicairos (El Mayito Flaco) in 2025, becoming one of their main allies in the region. This has also led to the cartel making advances into Sonora, territory they have previously not held.

On June 15, 2026, Mexican authorities arrested Iván Raymundo Olivas (“El 24”) in Sinaloa, accusing him of being a financial operator and plaza boss for the Guasave Cartel. Ten other alleged members, as well as meth labs, weapons, and vehicles were arrested or seized in concurrent operations in Culiacan, El Rosario, and Mazatlan.
