= Yulan Adonay Archaga Carias =

Honduran fugitive (born 1982)

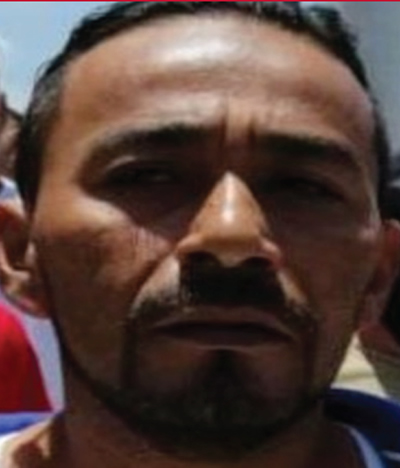

FBI Ten Most Wanted Fugitive
- Charges: Racketeering Conspiracy (RICO); Cocaine Importation Conspiracy; Possession of Machine Guns; Conspiracy to Possess Machine Guns
- Reward: $10,000,000
- Alias: Alexander Mendoza; Yulan Andony Archaga Carias "Porky"

Description
- Born: February 13, 1982 (age 44) or January 21, 1982 (age 44); San Pedro Sula, Honduras
- Gender: Male
- Height: 5 ft 5 in (165 cm)
- Weight: 160 lb (73 kg)

Status
- Added: November 3, 2021
- Number: 526
- Currently a Top Ten Fugitive

Yulan Adonay Archaga Carias (born February 13, 1982) is a Honduran fugitive, drug lord, and a suspected leader of the MS-13 gang in Honduras who was added to the FBI Ten Most Wanted Fugitives list on November 3, 2021. He is wanted for racketeering, narcotics trafficking, and firearms offenses. Archaga Carias is allegedly in charge of MS-13 for all of Honduras and is believed to be providing firearms, narcotics, and cash to gang members who are operating within the United States. He is also believed to be responsible for ordering the murders of rival gang members. Authorities believe he is still in Honduras.

In 2021, Archaga Carias became the 526th fugitive to be placed on the FBI's Ten Most Wanted Fugitives list. He replaced American fugitive Robert William Fisher, who was removed from the list for no longer meeting the list criteria. The FBI offered a reward of up to $100,000 for information leading to his capture. Additionally, he is also on the ICE Most Wanted list.

On February 8, 2023, the United States federal government ramped up pressure on Archaga Carias. The United States Department of State Bureau of International Narcotics and Law Enforcement Affairs offered a reward offer of $5 million USD through its Narcotics Rewards Program. The same day, the United States Department of the Treasury Office of Foreign Assets Control announced his sanctioning through placement on the Specially Designated Nationals and Blocked Persons List pursuant to Executive Order 13581.

== Conviction in Honduras and escape ==
Arrested in 2015, Archaga Carías was imprisoned in Honduras after being convicted of money laundering and illicit association.

On February 13, 2020, Archaga Carías left prison to attend a court hearing in the city of El Progreso, some 28 kilometers from San Pedro Sula. He was transported by van, not by helicopter, as was the norm. Barely any security guards accompanied him, and the military police were not given prior notice, as protocol dictates when such a high-profile inmate is in on the move. Upon arriving at the courthouse in the city of El Progreso, northern Honduras, an MS-13 squad barged in and helped him escape in a hail of bullets.

Security footage shows two groups of men dressed in military police uniforms arriving on the scene. The first group was escorting a man in handcuffs, a false prisoner used as a decoy. The second was escorting a man dressed in a black tunic that is generally used to protect the identity of a witness or victim. This time, it was used to hide weapons and ammunition.

== Indictment in New York ==
An episode of the Inside the FBI podcast about MS-13 and the FBI's hunt for Yulan Adonay Archaga Carias

In 2021 the United States Attorney for the Southern District of New York indicted Archaga Carias for charges related to racketeering, narcotics smuggling, and the use of firearms.

Following his indictment, Archaga Carias became the 526th fugitive to be placed on the FBI's Ten Most Wanted Fugitives list. He replaced American fugitive Robert William Fisher, who was removed from the list for no longer meeting the list criteria. The FBI offered a reward of up to $100,000 for information leading to his capture.

In 2022, the FBI devoted an episode of its podcast and YouTube series Inside the FBI to Archaga Carias and MS-13.

== Treasury sanctions ==
The United States Department of the Treasury Office of Foreign Assets Control announced his sanctioning through placement on the Specially Designated Nationals and Blocked Persons List pursuant to Executive Order 13581. The sanctions block Archaga Carias's property, and U.S. persons conducting business with him face prosecution under the International Emergency Economic Powers Act.

== State Department reward ==
Todd D. Robinson, Assistant Secretary of State for International Narcotics and Law Enforcement Affairs, announces a reward offer of up to $5 million for information leading to the arrest and/or conviction of Yulan Adonay Archaga Carías, also known as “Porky” or Alex Mendoza.

On February 8, 2023, the Bureau of International Narcotics and Law Enforcement Affairs announced a $5 million USD reward for information leading to the arrest and conviction of Archaga Carias. The bureau made the announcement a video recorded in both English and Spanish and distributed on its YouTube account.

== See also ==
- List of fugitives from justice who disappeared
- Honduran gang crackdown
