= MS-13 =

Transnational criminal gang

Mara Salvatrucha
- MS-13 logo
- Founded: 1980s
- Founding location: Pico-Union, Los Angeles, California, United States
- Years active: 1980s–present
- Territory: El Salvador, Guatemala, Honduras, Mexico, United States, Canada and Spain
- Ethnicity: Primarily Salvadoran, but also Honduran, Guatemalan and Mexican
- Membership (est.): 30,000–50,000 (global); 8,000–10,000 (United States)
- Activities: Drug trafficking, human trafficking, weapons trafficking, murder, rape, assault, kidnapping, identification theft, prostitution, robbery, auto theft, extortion, vandalism
- Allies: Gulf Cartel; Jalisco New Generation Cartel; Mexican Mafia; Sinaloa Cartel; Sureños and affiliated gangs; Los Zetas
- Rivals: 18th Street gang; Bloods; Latin Kings; Norteños and affiliated gangs; Tiny Rascal Gang

Mara Salvatrucha (Spanish: [ˈmaɾa salβaˈtɾut͡ʃa]; lit. 'Cunning Salvadoran gang' (Note: Mara Salvatrucha is a combination of many slang terms. Mara is used in El Salvador for "gang." Salvatrucha is a combination of Salva, short for Salvadoran, and trucha, which is slang for "look out," "alert," or "cunning." The 13 represents the letter M, a show of their loyalty to the Mexican Mafia. (See MS-13 § Etymology))), commonly known as MS-13, is an international criminal gang that originated in Los Angeles, California, in the 1980s. Originally, the gang was set up to protect Salvadoran immigrants from other gangs in the Los Angeles area. Over time, the gang grew into a more traditional criminal organization. MS-13 has a longtime rivalry with the 18th Street gang.

Many MS-13 members were deported to El Salvador after the end of the Salvadoran Civil War in 1992, or upon being arrested, facilitating the spread of the gang to Central America. The gang is active in many parts of the continental United States, Canada, Mexico, and Central America. Most members are Central American—Salvadorans in particular.

As an international gang, its history is closely tied to United States–El Salvador relations. In 2018, the gang's US membership of up to 10,000 accounted for less than 1% of the 1.4 million gang members in the United States, and a similar share of gang murders. On January 20, 2025, President Donald Trump signed an executive order initiating the process to designate various drug cartels and transnational gangs, including MS-13, as Foreign Terrorist Organizations (FTOs). The order was officially enacted on February 20, 2025, making such groups officially terrorist organizations.

== Description ==
=== Etymology ===
There is some dispute about the etymology of the name. Some sources state the gang is named for La Mara, a street in San Salvador, and the Salvatrucha guerrillas who fought in the Salvadoran Civil War. Additionally, the word mara means "swarm" in Caliche slang and is taken from marabunta, the name of a fierce type of ant. "Salvatrucha" may be a combination of the words Salvadoran and trucha, a Caliche word for being alert. The term "Salvatruchas" has been explained as a reference to Salvadoran peasants trained to become guerrilla fighters, referred to as the "Farabundo Martí National Liberation Front." "13" is believed to stand for the letter M, the thirteenth letter of the alphabet, but it is also rumored to pay homage to the Mexican Mafia prison gang.

=== Characteristics ===
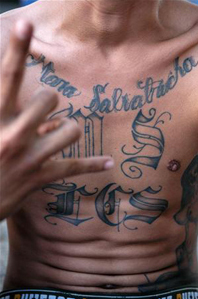
An MS gang sign and tattoos

Membership in Mara Salvatrucha consists primarily of Salvadorans and Salvadoran Americans, but also Hondurans, Guatemalans, Mexicans, and other Central and South Americans. Central Americans are the primary targets of violence and threats of violence by MS-13. Many of the victims are minors. Minors also make up the majority of suspects arrested for killings attributed to MS-13. MS-13 gang members typically arrive in the United States from Central America as unaccompanied minors. Many school districts receiving Central American migrants were reluctant to admit unaccompanied teenagers when they arrived from Central America, which left them at home and vulnerable to gang recruitment. Recruitment is often forced. In El Salvador, children are recruited while traveling to school, church, or work. Incarcerated youth are usually impressed into a gang during their incarceration. MS-13 are notorious for their violence and a subcultural moral code based on merciless retribution. Aspirants are beaten for 13 seconds as an initiation to join the gang, a ritual known as "jumping-in". At least one faction of MS-13 – the Fulton clique in Los Angeles – has required prospective members to commit a murder in order to be considered for full-fledged membership.

Mara Salvatrucha gang members are typically impoverished young men and teenagers, who are often homeless and estranged from family, and who subsist on minor drug dealing, theft and extortion of street vendors and other small-time criminals. MS-13 members use abandoned buildings in urban areas, known as "destroyers", as places of residence and to host clandestine meetings, parties and drug deals. Gang members who are employed usually work in the construction, restaurant, delivery service, and landscaping industries, presenting false documentation to employers. The gang is often public in its violence. Infanticide and femicide are common, with El Salvador hosting the third-highest femicide rate in the world. In 2016, one in 5,000 Salvadoran women were killed. Legal impunity is a key factor. In femicide cases, only 5% result in convictions. Violent retributions target enemy gangs as well as rival gang members' entire families, friends, and neighbors. Occupied passenger buses are sometimes burned. Police officers, government officials, and community organizations are frequent targets. Attacks like these have led the Supreme Court of El Salvador to authorize the classification of gangs as terrorist organizations.

The cruelty of the distinguished members of the Maras or Mareros resulted in some being recruited by the Sinaloa Cartel battling against Los Zetas in the Mexican drug war. Their wide-ranging activities have drawn the attention of the Federal Bureau of Investigation (FBI) and U.S. Immigration and Customs Enforcement (ICE), who have initiated wide-scale raids against known and suspected gang members, arresting hundreds across the United States. In an interview with Bill Ritter in late 2017, Nassau County, New York District Attorney Madeline Singas, referring to crimes committed by MS-13 gang members, stated: "The crimes that we're talking about are brutal. Their weapon of choice is a machete. We end up seeing people with injuries that I've never seen before. You know, limbs hacked off. And that's what the bodies look like that we're recovering. So they're brutal. They're ruthless, and we're gonna be relentless in our attacks against them." The choice of a machete is in contrast to other gangs, which prefer to use guns. Officials state the gang has ambitions to become a 'national brand' with an organization to match the Mafia or Mexican drug cartels and estimate its membership has grown by several thousand in the last decade, with a presence in forty states.

Many Mara Salvatrucha members have tattoos, including facial tattoos. Common markings include "MS", "Salvatrucha", the "Devil Horns", and the name of their clique. By 2007, the gang was moving away from face tattoos to make it easier to commit crimes without being noticed. Members of Mara Salvatrucha, like those of most modern American gangs, utilize a system of hand signs for purposes of identification and communication. Among the gang's most common hand signs is a gesture in which the extended index fingers of both hands are held in front (or on the sides) of the face, mimicking "Devil horns". Another common gesture is similar to the sign of the horns frequently used in rock music, wherein both the index and pinkie fingers are extended and the middle and ring fingers are curled against the palm—the MS-13 version of this gesture is typically characterized by splayed-apart fingers, often with the sign held close to the face (again mimicking "Devil horns").

Mara Salvatrucha has traditionally consisted of loosely affiliated clandestine cells known as cliques. MS-13 gangs in the United States are loosely affiliated with one another and their specific activities are primarily determined by local circumstances. Law enforcement officials have reported an increased coordination of criminal activity among the gang's cliques in the Atlanta, Dallas, Los Angeles, Washington, D.C., and New York metropolitan areas. In El Salvador, the gang is more centralized and cohesive. In 2002, several high-ranking MS-13 members began establishing the Ranfla Nacional, the gang's "command and control structure", which has directed acts of violence and murders in El Salvador and the United States.

=== Presence ===
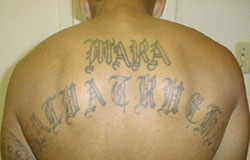
Members frequently have identifiable tattoos

According to the 2009 National Gang Threat Assessment, Mara Salvatrucha was "estimated to have 30,000 to 50,000 members and associate members worldwide, 8,000 to 10,000 of whom reside in the United States." Other estimates assessed the total membership at around 30,000 members internationally. Several thousand MS-13 gang members are believed to be in El Salvador's Terrorism Confinement Center.

MS-13 is one of the largest Hispanic street gangs operating in the United States. The gang has cliques in approximately ten U.S. states, with activity in at least 42 states and the District of Columbia. Mara Salvatrucha has around 15 to 20 cliques active in Los Angeles, with the gang claiming parts of Westlake, MacArthur Park, Pico-Union, Koreatown, East Hollywood, North Hollywood, Panorama City and Van Nuys as its territory. In New York, MS-13 is based primarily in the Woodhaven, Jamaica, Flushing and Rockaway areas of Queens, as well as on Long Island, according to one 2008 report. The Federal Bureau of Investigation (FBI) reported in 2008 that the highest threat from Mara Salvatrucha was in the Western and Northeastern U.S., coinciding with elevated Salvadoran immigrant populations in those areas. MS-13 activity in the Southeast was increasing at the time due to an influx of gang members. In early 2018, the district attorney for Nassau County, New York, stated that an investigation had "uncovered a structured network of MS-13 operations in New Jersey, Maryland, Virginia, Texas, from within a Mississippi prison cell, and in countries around the globe including Mexico, Colombia, Korea, France, Australia, Peru, Egypt, Ecuador and Cuba."

Mara Salvatrucha also operates in Central America and Mexico. The gang is strongest in Central America's Northern Triangle countries of El Salvador, Honduras, and Guatemala. By 2020, in El Salvador, it was estimated that MS-13 and the 18th Street gang employed some 60,000 between them, making them the largest employers in the country. Mara Salvatrucha expanded significantly in Mexico at the direction of Ranfla Nacional, the gang's "board of directors". By 2023, following Salvadoran president Nayib Bukele's "State of Exception" crackdown and updates to the data collection system, the national police database recorded more than 120,000 gang members, aspiring members and collaborators.

Robert Morales, a prosecutor for Guatemala, indicated in 2008 to The Globe and Mail that some Central American gang members were seeking refugee status in Canada. "We know that there are members of Mara 18 and MS-13 who are in Canada and are seeking to stay there," and added, "I came across a gang member who was working in a call centre here. He'd just returned from a long stint in Ontario. We're hearing about Canada more and more often in connection with gang members here." Superintendent of the Royal Canadian Mounted Police (RCMP) integrated gang task force, John Robin, was quoted in the same article as saying "I think [gang members] have a feeling that police here won't treat them in the harsh manner they get down there." Robin noted that Canadian authorities "want to avoid ending up like the U.S., which is dealing with the problem of Central American gangsters on a much bigger scale". In May 2018, Canadian federal authorities warned Canadian police services of gangs members attempting to flee the United States into Canada.

Prior to a 2014 crackdown on the gang by the Spanish National Police Corps, MS-13 operated five cliques in Spain, located in Madrid, Girona, Barcelona, and Ibi. Mara Salvatrucha's operations in Spain were provided with financial and logistical support by the gang's El Salvador-based leadership as part of MS-13's expansionist agenda known as Programa 34 ("Program 34").

== History ==
The Mara Salvatrucha gang originated in Los Angeles, set up in the 1980s by Salvadoran immigrants in the city's Pico-Union, Westlake and Rampart neighborhoods who immigrated to the United States after the Central American civil wars of the 1980s. Throughout the 1970s and 1980s, Salvadoran asylum seekers were refused asylum in the U.S. and instead classified as undocumented immigrants. As such, Salvadorans began to immigrate without documents in increasing numbers. They mostly settled in cities with large undocumented populations, like Los Angeles. Salvadoran asylum claims were neglected until the 1991 case American Baptist Churches v. Thornburgh. The case's settlement agreement required Guatemalan and Salvadoran asylum claims to be reevaluated, as long as they had entered the U.S. by 1990. By this point, the civil war was already drawing to a close after more than a decade of fighting. Before American Baptist Churches v. Thornburg and even after, Salvadoran immigrants were left highly vulnerable to exploitation.

In the very beginning, MS-13 was a group of young, delinquent, heavy metal fans who lived in Los Angeles. However, the undocumented community in Los Angeles was subject to severe racial prejudices and persecution. Under these conditions, MS-13 began to mutate into a gang. Originally, the gang's main purpose was to protect Salvadoran immigrants from the other, more established gangs of Los Angeles, who were predominantly composed of Mexicans, Asians, and African-Americans. Some of the original members of the MS-13 adhered to Satanism, and while the majority of contemporary MS-13 members do not identify as Satanists, the Satanist influence is still seen in some of their symbolism. The gang became a more traditional criminal organization under the auspices of Ernesto Deras. Deras was a former member of Salvadoran special forces, trained in Panama by United States Green Berets. On gaining leadership of an MS-13 clique in 1990, he used his military training to discipline the gang and improve its logistical operations. It was after this point that the gang began to grow in power. MS-13's rivalry with the 18th Street Gang also began in this period. MS-13 and 18th Street were initially friendly, since they were some of the only gangs to allow Salvadorans to join. What exactly caused their alliance to fall apart is uncertain. Most versions point to a fight over a girl in 1989. In the incident, an MS-13 gangster was killed, which led to a cycle of vengeance that has escalated into an intense and generalized animosity between the two gangs.

Many MS-13 gang members from the Los Angeles area have been deported after being arrested. For example, Jose Abrego, a high-ranking member, was deported four times. Large-scale deportations of ex-convicts began shortly after the close of the Salvadoran Civil War in 1992. As a result of these deportations, members of MS-13 have recruited more members in their home countries, and MS-13 took root in El Salvador, where there wasn't significant gang activity before. The Los Angeles Times contends that deportation policies have contributed to the size and influence of the gang both in the United States and in Central America.

The war had lasted for more than 12 years and included the deliberate terrorizing and targeting of civilians by US-trained government death squads including the targeting of prominent clergy from the Catholic Church. The war saw the recruitment of child soldiers and other human rights violations, mostly by the military, which left the country susceptible to gang infiltration.

As a part of the Chapultepec Peace Accords, the post-war Salvadoran government was required to stop using the standing army as a police force and form a new national police service. However, the ruling political party, ARENA, was a descendant of the wartime military government. To favor military allies, it delayed the formation of the National Civil Police of El Salvador (PNC). When the PNC was finally organized 1993, parts of the police force were created by integrating the armed forces. Some of the members of the nascent police force were known war criminals. The lack of a proper police force meant that deported gangsters faced little opposition when establishing MS-13 in El Salvador. To compound the issue, the post-war period was marked by the existence of a large number of uncontrolled arms left over from the conflict, which allowed MS-13 to become a significant arms trafficker. This remains one of its primary revenue sources today, alongside extortion and assassination. In addition, the economic struggles of the post-war period, alongside neoliberal trade reforms, likely contributed to the growth of MS-13.

=== Attempts at suppression ===
Gang violence in El Salvador peaked in the 1990s. Though it declined somewhat in the early 2000s, it became a key part of political discourse. ARENA presidencies implemented the Mano Dura and Super Mano Dura policies to combat gangs. External observers and gangsters themselves believe these policies increased the power of gangs in El Salvador.

In 2004, the Federal Bureau of Investigation (FBI) created the MS-13 National Gang Task Force, which facilitates cooperation among local and state law enforcement agencies in order to dismantle MS-13. The strategies of the Task Force include the deportation of Mara Salvatrucha members to their home countries, an effort which has instead exacerbated the gang problem by excelling its proliferation internationally.

The Mano Dura policies were followed by a truce between MS-13 and their perpetual rivals, the 18th Street Gang. Under the direction of the president Mauricio Funes, the first Salvadoran President representing the FMLN party, government and gang representatives negotiated unofficially. The terms required gangs to lower the homicide rate in exchange for transfers to lower security prisons. In addition, gangs would receive benefits from the government for every firearm they surrendered. While homicides fell during the truce, gangs no longer had to worry as much about turf wars. Instead, they focused on recruitment, organization, and extortion. The truce did not protect most Salvadorans from extortion. This, along with reports of government leniency towards imprisoned gangsters, led to the truce being highly unpopular and controversial.

Funes's successor as the FMLN presidential candidate, Salvador Sánchez Cerén, campaigned on returning to a tough approach on gangs. After Sánchez Cerén took the Presidency in 2014, the truce was understood to be over. Since the gang truce ended, the number of extrajudicial killings by police forces has grown dramatically. Throughout the truce, Salvadoran gangs were able to focus on expansion and internal regulation instead of inter-gang conflict. When the truce ended, the gangs had built up their forces significantly. As such, the truce breakdown saw a return to record levels of violence, with the gangs being much stronger and better organized than before. In 2015, El Salvador had the highest national homicide rate per capita in the world, largely due to escalating violence between MS-13 and the 18th Street Gang. Participants in the original truce negotiations have since been prosecuted. The trials revealed significant corruption, such as government negotiators encouraging gangs to increase the homicide rate to keep everyone at the negotiating table.

Opposition to MS-13 in the U.S. has taken varied forms. In 2004, the FBI created the MS-13 National Gang Task Force. The FBI also began cooperating with law enforcement in El Salvador, Honduras, Guatemala, and Mexico, and set up its own office in San Salvador in February 2005. The following year, the FBI helped create a National Gang Information Center (NGIC), and outlined a National Gang Strategy for Congress. In addition, the Office of U.S. Immigration and Customs Enforcement initiated Operation Community Shield. In 2008, the MS-13 Task Force coordinated a series of arrests and crackdowns in the U.S. and Central America that involved more than 6,000 police officers in five countries. Seventy-three suspects were arrested in the U.S.; in all, more than 650 were taken into custody. By 2011, this operation had made over 20,000 arrests, including more than 3,000 arrests of alleged MS-13 members. In October 2012, the U.S. Treasury Department announced a freeze on American-owned assets controlled by the organization and listed MS-13 as a transnational criminal organization. While the three leaders (José Luís Mendoza Figueroa, Eduardo Erazo Nolasco, and Élmer Canales Rivera) were imprisoned in El Salvador, they continued to give orders. Elmer, being the founder of the " Twelve Apostles of the Devil" leadership board. As a result, the U.S. Treasury Department imposed further sanctions in 2015, allowing the government to seize all assets controlled by these men; any business with these leaders would be closed down. In January 2016, over 400 Boston police officers were involved in the arrests of 37 MS-13 members; 56 were charged altogether. Weapons and funds were also seized at the homes of the gang members. Massachusetts State Police Lt. Col. Frank Hughes commented in a public conference, "In my 30 years of law enforcement, I've never seen a more violent gang out there. These are very very violent individuals. The violence is unspeakable." The charges included immigration violations, racketeering, and firearm and drug trafficking. On November 16, 2017, the U.S. Department of Homeland Security (DHS), U.S. Department of Justice (DOJ), and Immigration and Customs Enforcement (ICE) officials announced that they arrested a total of 267 alleged MS-13 gang members and associates in Operation Raging Bull, which was carried out in two phases. The first phase was in September 2017, and resulted in 53 arrests in El Salvador. The second phase was between October 8 and November 11, 2017, and resulted in 214 arrests in the U.S. Charges included drug trafficking, child prostitution, human smuggling, racketing, and conspiracy to commit murder.

On June 4, 2008, in Toronto, Ontario, police executed search warrants, made 21 arrests, and laid dozens of charges following a five-month investigation.

On July 27, 2017, 113 suspected MS-13 gang members were arrested by Salvadoran authorities.

In January 2021, Acting United States Attorney General Jeffrey Rosen announced terrorism charges against fourteen MS-13 leaders known as "Ranfla Nacional" and imprisoned in El Salvador.

In June 2022, during the 2022 Salvadoran gang crackdown, one of the gang's leaders, César Alfredo Romero Chávez, was sentenced to 1,090 years imprisonment in El Salvador after being convicted of twenty-four counts of aggravated homicide between 2017 and 2018.

By January 2025, over 80,000 Salvadorans had been detained during the "State of Exception" crackdown, with 8,000 of those found innocent and released, and 15,000 gang members incarcerated in a newly built Terrorism Confinement Center.

In June 2025, ProPublica reported that U.S. extradition requests of MS-13 leaders whom investigators considered to be potential witnesses had been blocked by Nayib Bukele's government. The outlet also reported that a U.S. multiagency law enforcement team, Joint Task Force Vulcan, had previously suspected that United States Agency for International Development (USAID) funds to El Salvador had been diverted and laundered in order to benefit MS-13 leaders, and submitted a request to review U.S.-based financial records for possible evidence of corruption.

==== U.S. pursuit of Yulan Adonay Archaga Carias ====
On November 3, 2021, the Federal Bureau of Investigation issued a press release stating that Yulan Adonay Archaga Carias was being added to the FBI's list of Top Ten Most Wanted Fugitives with a $100,000 reward for information leading to his capture. Archaga Carias is the alleged leader of MS-13 for all of Honduras. According to the FBI, Archaga Carias is charged federally in the Southern District of New York with racketeering conspiracy, cocaine importation conspiracy, and possession and conspiracy to possess machine guns.

On February 8, 2023, the United States federal government ramped up pressure on Archaga Carias. The United States Department of State Bureau of International Narcotics and Law Enforcement Affairs offered a reward offer of five million dollars through its Narcotics Rewards Program. The same day, the United States Department of the Treasury Office of Foreign Assets Control announced his sanctioning through placement on the Specially Designated Nationals and Blocked Persons List pursuant to Executive Order 13581.

==== 2023 Most Wanted ====
As of 2023, there were MS-13 members and associates besides Carias who are wanted by both the FBI and DHS. Each government agency is offering ten thousand dollars for information leading to their arrest and conviction. They include:

- Freddy Ivan Jandres-Parada (captured in 2024)
- Cesar Humberto Lopez-Larios (captured in 2024) (charges dropped and deported to El Salvador in 2025)
- Jorge Alexander De La Cruz
- Juan Antonio Martinez-Abrego
- Francisco Javier Roman-Bardales (captured in 2025)
- Carlos Tiberio Ramirez-Valladares
- Hugo Armando Quinteros-Mineros
- José Orlando González Medina
- José Raúl Iraheta
- Jesús Guillermo Alvarado Serrano
- Ingrid Estela Hernández

=== Political discourse ===
MS-13 has been a theme in the Republican Party's, in particular President Donald Trump's, discourse during political campaigns and debates on immigration. Republicans have accused Democrats of being responsible for violence by MS-13 gangs and have called for stricter immigration policies to deal with MS-13. Republican politicians have argued that sanctuary cities (jurisdictions which do not prioritize enforcement of immigration law) contribute to MS-13 activity; however, studies on the relationship between sanctuary status and crime have found that sanctuary policies either have no effect or decrease crime rates.

During the Trump administration, MS-13 became a top priority for the Department of Justice. Trump falsely claimed that towns had been "liberated" from MS-13 rule during his presidency. In 2018, Donald Trump's State of the Union Address included Evelyn Rodriguez, the mother of a child who was killed by MS-13 members. Rodriguez died soon after from a non-MS-13 related case. Trump also falsely claimed on multiple occasions that his administration had deported "thousands and thousands" of MS-13 gang members. In justifying the Trump administration's implementation of a family separation policy of migrants accused of crossing the border illegally, Kirstjen Nielsen, Secretary of the Department of Homeland Security, said that child migrants were being used by MS-13 to cross the US-Mexico border; there is no evidence that MS-13 members have falsely claimed custodianship of children crossing the U.S. border.

In the United States, there were an estimated 10,000 MS-13 gang members in 2018, showing stable membership numbers for more than a decade. The gang accounts for less than 1 percent of total gang members in the United States (1.4 million according to FBI data), and a similar share of gang murders. However, an FBI assessment has reported that "Sureño gangs, including Mara Salvatrucha (MS-13), 18th street, and Florencia 13, are expanding faster than other national-level gangs, both in membership and geographically." The Trump administration has stated that there is a "surge in MS-13 gang members" and that weak immigration enforcement contributes to greater MS-13 crime activity; there has been no evidence to corroborate either of those claims.

== Publicized crimes ==
Mara Salvatrucha members are involved in the trafficking of narcotics, primarily cocaine and marijuana, into the United States, as well as the transportation and distribution of illicit drugs throughout the U.S. Conversely, the gang is engaged in the trafficking of stolen vehicles from the U.S. to Central America. MS-13 also utilizes intimidation and violence to extort payment from legal and illegal businesses operating in its territory. Members partake in additional criminal activities including alien smuggling, weapons trafficking, assault, homicide, rape, kidnapping, identification theft, home invasions, carjackings, prostitution, robbery, and vandalism.

MS-13 is affiliated with the Sureño coalition of gangs which pay tribute to the Mexican Mafia. The gang has colluded with the Mexican Mafia in drug trafficking. Mara Salvatrucha leaders in Mexico have brokered deals with the Zetas, Gulf, Jalisco New Generation, and Sinaloa cartels in order to obtain narcotics and firearms. As of 2007, the gang was being violent to migrants on the southern border of Mexico. MS-13's biggest rival internationally is the 18th Street gang. Other rival gangs include the Bloods and the Latin Kings. Infighting among Mara Salvatrucha cliques has also taken place.

=== Cases ===
On July 13, 2003, Brenda Paz, a 17-year-old former MS-13 member turned informant, was found stabbed to death on the banks of the Shenandoah River in Virginia. She was four months pregnant at the time, prior to being killed for informing the FBI about Mara Salvatrucha's criminal activities; two of her former friends were later convicted of the murder.

On December 23, 2004, one of the most widely publicized MS-13 crimes in Central America occurred in Chamelecón, Honduras, when an intercity bus was intercepted and sprayed with automatic gunfire from assault rifles, killing 28 and wounding 21 civilian passengers, most of whom were women and children. MS-13 organized the massacre as a protest against the Honduran government for proposing a restoration of the death penalty in Honduras. Six gunmen raked the bus with gunfire. As passengers screamed and ducked, another gunman climbed aboard and methodically executed passengers. In February 2007, Juan Carlos Miranda Bueso and Darwin Alexis Ramírez were found guilty of several crimes, including murder and attempted murder. Ebert Anibal Rivera was arrested over the attack after fleeing to Texas. Juan Bautista Jimenez, accused of masterminding the massacre, was killed in prison; according to the authorities, fellow MS-13 inmates hanged him. There was insufficient evidence to convict Óscar Fernando Mendoza and Wilson Geovany Gómez.

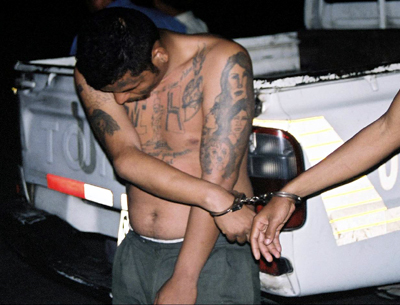
An MS-13 suspect bearing gang tattoos is handcuffed.

On May 13, 2006, Ernesto "Smokey" Miranda, a former high-ranking soldier and one of the founders of Mara Salvatrucha, was murdered at his home in El Salvador a few hours after declining to attend a party for a gang member who had just been released from prison. He had begun studying law and working to keep children out of gangs.

On June 6, 2006, a teenage MS-13 gang member named Gabriel Granillo was stabbed to death at Ervan Chew Park in the Neartown district in Houston, Texas. Chris Vogel of the Houston Press wrote that the trial of the girl who stabbed Granillo, Ashley Paige Benton, gave attention to MS-13.

In 2007, Julio Chavez, a Long Island, New York, MS-13 member, allegedly murdered a man because he was wearing a red sweatshirt and mistaken for a member of the Bloods gang.

In January 2008, the Vietnam Veterans Memorial in New Haven, Connecticut, was vandalized several times with the "MS-13 tag" and "kill whites" in orange spray paint.

On June 22, 2008, in San Francisco, California, a 21-year-old MS-13 gang member, Edwin Ramos, shot and killed a father, Anthony Bologna, 48, and his two sons Michael, 20, and Matthew, 16, as they were returning home from a family barbecue. Their car had briefly blocked Ramos from completing a left turn down a narrow street. Authorities believe the killing was in retaliation for the shooting of an MS-13 member earlier that day, and that the Bolognas were mistaken for gang members.

On November 26, 2008, Jonathan Retana was convicted of the murder of Miguel Angel Deras in Hamilton County, Ohio, which the authorities linked to an MS-13 initiation.

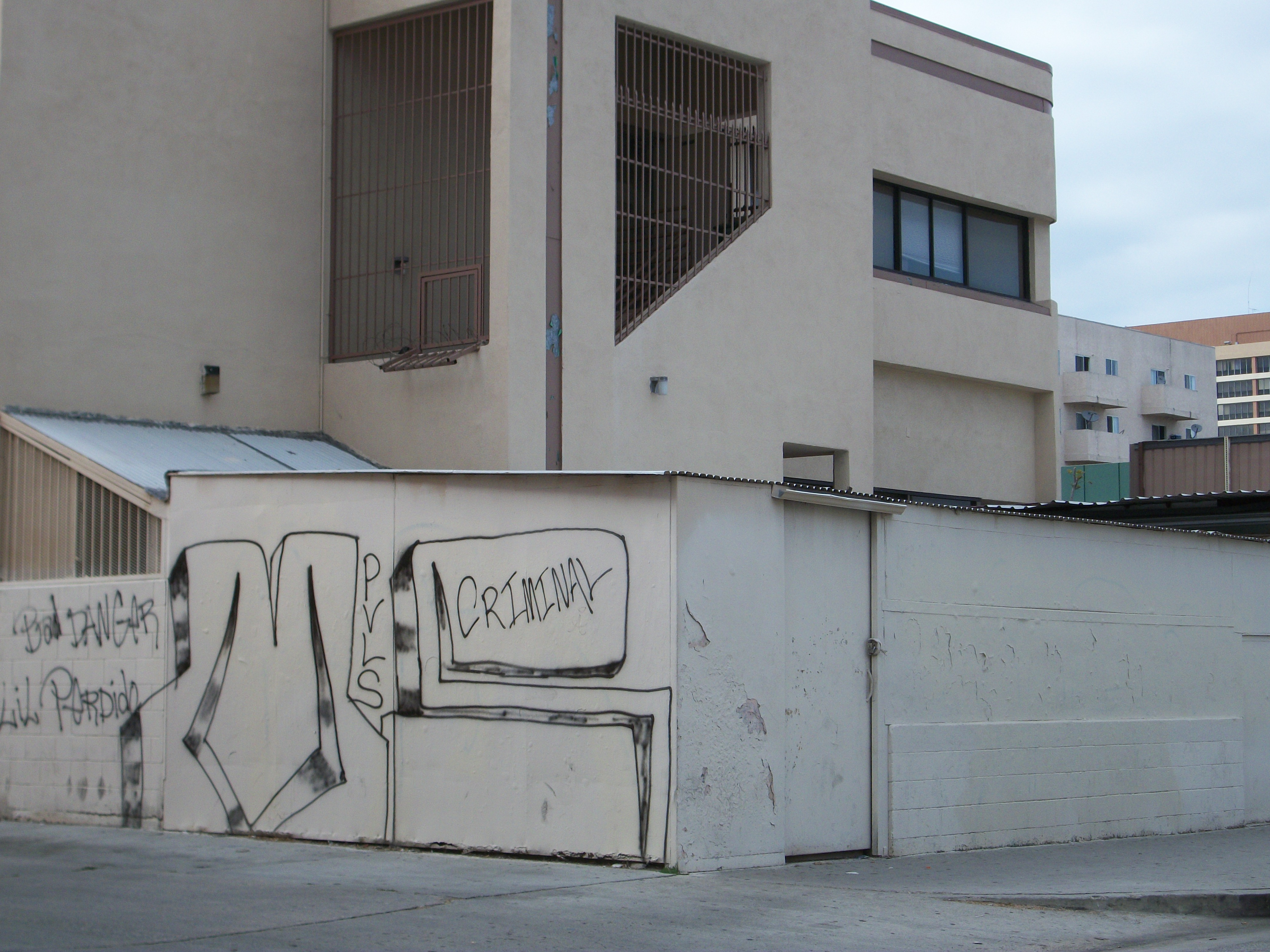

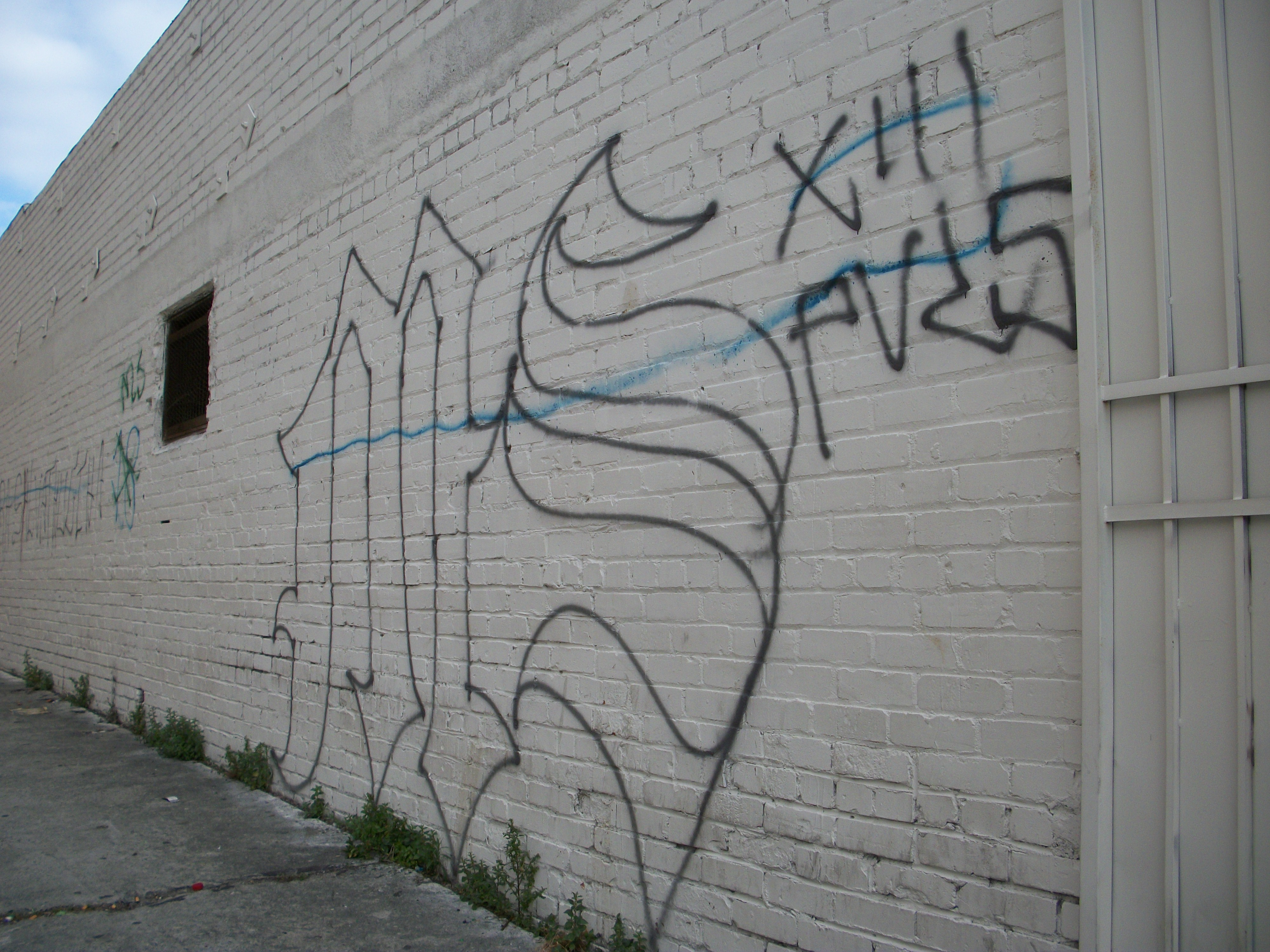
Gang graffiti

In February 2009, authorities in Colorado and California arrested 20 members of MS-13 and seized 10 pounds of methamphetamine, 2.3 kilograms (5 pounds) of cocaine, a small amount of heroin, 12 firearms, and $3,300 in cash.

In June 2009, Edwin Ortiz, Jose Gomez Amaya, and Alexander Aguilar, MS-13 gang members from Long Island who had mistaken bystanders for rival gang members, shot two innocent civilians. Edgar Villalobos, a laborer, was killed.

On November 4, 2009, El Salvadoran leaders of the MS-13 gang allegedly put out a contract on the federal agent responsible for a crackdown on its New York factions, the Daily News learned. The plot to assassinate the unidentified Immigration and Customs Enforcement agent was revealed in an arrest warrant for reputed gang member Walter "Duke" Torres. Torres tipped authorities to the plan after he and four MS-13 members were stopped by NYPD detectives for hassling passersby on Northern Boulevard in Queens, New York. He told police he had information to pass on; he was debriefed on October 22 at Rikers Island, where he was being held on a warrant issued in Virginia, according to court papers. Torres said "the order for the murder came from gang leadership in El Salvador", ICE agent Sean Sweeney wrote in an affidavit for a new warrant charging Torres with conspiracy. Torres, who belonged to an MS-13 "clique" in Virginia, said he was put in charge, and traveled to New York in August "for the specific purpose of participating in the planning and execution of the murder plot", Sweeney wrote. Gang members were trying to obtain a high-powered rifle to penetrate the agent's bulletproof vest. Another MS-13 informant told authorities the agent was marked for death because the gang was "exceedingly angry" at him for arresting many members in the past three years, the affidavit states. The murder was supposed to be carried out by the Flushing clique, according to the informant. Federal prosecutors have indicted numerous MS-13 gang members on racketeering, extortion, prostitution, kidnapping, illegal immigration, money laundering, murder, people smuggling, arms trafficking, human trafficking and drug trafficking charges; the targeted special agent was the lead federal investigator on many of the federal cases.

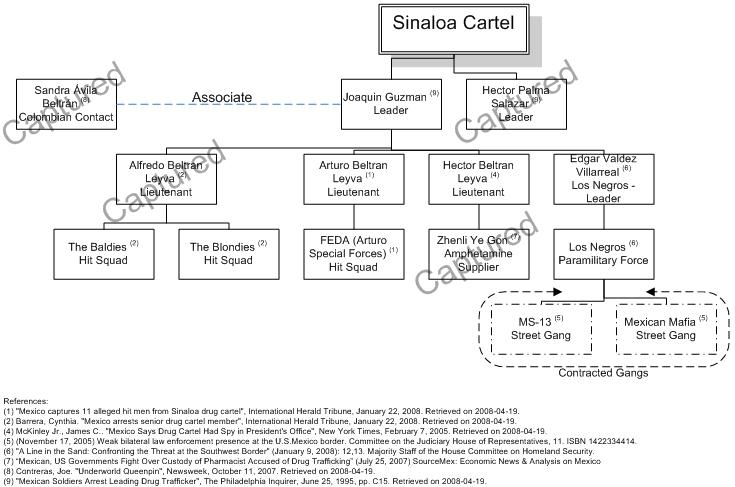
Sinaloa Cartel hierarchy in early 2008

In August 2011, six San Francisco MS-13 members were convicted of racketeering and conspiracy, including three murders, in what was the city's largest-scope gang trial in many years. Another 18 defendants reported to have ties to the gang pleaded guilty before trial. Two of the men murdered had been mistaken for rival gang members because of their red clothing, and another was described by prosecution witnesses as a seller of fake documents who refused to pay 'taxes' to MS-13 in its territory

In February 2012, a federal judge convicted three MS-13 gang members of murder. Their victim, Moises Frias Jr., was killed, and two of his companions severely wounded, after MS-13 members mistook them for members of the rival Norteños gang because of their red clothing. Danilo Velasquez, the former leader of the San Francisco branch of MS-13, was sentenced to life imprisonment plus 10 years, and is incarcerated at USP Hazelton.

In October 2016, Jordy Mejia was kidnapped and murdered in Maryland. On February 1, 2019, 23-year-old Reynaldo "Fuego" Granados-Vasquez, 22-year-old Neris Moreno-Martinez, and 21-year-old Jose "Liar" Melendez-Rivera pleaded guilty to using a fake Facebook account to lure Mejia from New Jersey. The three MS-13 members, natives of El Salvador, were in the United States illegally.

On March 27, 2017, Raymond Wood was discovered dead on the road in Bedford, Virginia. Six individuals have been charged with his robbery, abduction and murder. They are also charged with being members of MS-13.

On August 13–14, 2017, New Jersey MS-13 faction member Walter Yovany Gomez, who was added to the FBI most wanted list in April 2017, was apprehended and charged with the brutal 2011 murder of his friend, Julio Matute, for associating with another gang. After a night of drinking, Gomez and another MS-13 member smacked Matute on the head with a baseball bat, sliced his throat with a knife, and stabbed him in the back with a screwdriver 17 times. Gomez managed to evade arrest but was later captured in Virginia, where he was hiding out with other MS-13 gang members.

In 2017, two MS-13 members, Miguel Alvarez-Flores and Diego Hernandez-Rivera, were arrested for kidnapping, raping, torturing, and drugging a 14-year-old girl for over two weeks in Houston, Texas. According to the 14-year-old, the members also held two other victims hostage in the same apartment.

The East Coast kingpin of the MS-13, Miguel Angel Corea Diaz, of Laurel, Maryland (of Prince George's County), was arraigned April 19, 2018, in Nassau County Court in Mineola, New York, on charges including conspiracy to commit murder. He could be sentenced to life in prison if he is convicted. He was one of seventeen defendants in a 21-count indictment in January that charged him with several counts of conspiracy to commit murder and operating as a high-level trafficker of controlled substances. He was extradited the week of April 23, 2018, from Prince George's County, Maryland, where he was held since October. The earlier jailing was in lieu of $125,000 bail. The gang reportedly issued a call to "take out a cop" in retaliation for Diaz's arrest.

An MS-13 member, René Pacheco, boasted in Canada of being a member. In 2018 he faced a deportation order.

In 2018, Jose Villanueva was lured to his death by several MS-13 members. Karla Jackelin Morales was an MS-13 member and escaped by removing her ankle bracelet. A $5,000 reward was being given for information leading to her capture. In 2023, Morales was captured and agreed to a 30-year deal.

In a January 6, 2020, court filing, the United States Department of Justice sought the death penalty against Elmer Martinez, an MS-13 gang leader in Virginia. Court documents charged Martinez with the 2016 murders of two minors, 17-year-old Edvin Mendez and 14-year-old Sergio Trimino. Martinez, known by the alias "Killer", was accused of luring Mendez and Trimino to a park in Alexandria, Virginia, where they were killed and buried.

In February 2025, Alejandro Gonzales, an alleged senior member of the Fulton Locos Salvatrucha clique of MS-13, escaped custody during a prison transfer near San Miguel, El Salvador. Gonzales, who reportedly harbors ambitions of staging an 'invasion' from the southern border, had been facing charges related to drug trafficking and gang-related homicides. His escape was revealed in April 2025 through U.S. court documents unsealed in an unrelated federal racketeering case in California, where he is now believed to be in hiding.

In May 2025, William Pineda Portillo pleaded guilty in federal court in Boston to racketeering conspiracy as a member of MS-13. After fleeing to El Salvador following a 2010 murder, he illegally reentered the U.S. and planned a second murder.

==== Long Island, New York cases, 2010s ====
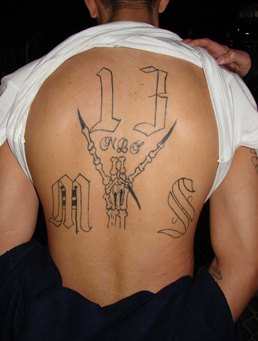
MS-13 gang member with back body tattoo

In 2010, Rene Mejia allegedly murdered a Long Island 2-year-old baby. According to a confession by a fellow gang member, Adalberto Guzman, MS-13 members decided to "drop", or murder in their slang, the baby's mother because she had "disrespected" the gang by trying to have rival gang members beat up her former MS-13 boyfriend. According to Guzman, after the mother was lured into the woods with an invitation to smoke cannabis, he killed her, and the baby then began screaming and crying and was executed with two shots to the head.

On June 30, 2015, Jonathan Cardona-Hernandez was discovered shot dead on a street in Central Islip, New York. MS-13 member William Castellano was accused of murdering him on the suspicion that Cardona-Hernandez was a member of a rival gang. Castellano was sentenced in the Eastern District of New York federal court to 27 years in prison for the crime on January 24, 2019.

The NYPD said that MS-13 were responsible for 17 murders between January 2016 and April 2016 in Long Island.

In August 2017, Kevin Granados-Coreas and Carlos Portillo were charged with the January murder of 19-year-old civilian Julio Cesar Gonzales-Espantzay, who was lured with promises of cannabis and sex to a forest in Long Island, where he was attacked with machetes and stabbed with knives. Nassau County police also said the two members were responsible for 21 murders in New York in just short of two years. Authorities said the motive was to gain reputation.

On August 20, 2018, Josue Portillo, a 17-year old member of MS-13 from Long Island, pleaded guilty to racketeering charges. Portillo participated in the murder of four young Latino men assumed to be in a rival gang. Portillo, along with several other of his fellow gang members, lured the four young men into the woods behind a soccer field in Central Islip on April 11, 2017, then proceeded to kill the victims using machetes, knives, and wooden clubs. Although he was 15 years and 11 months old at the time of the murders, he was prosecuted as an adult and faces life in prison. Portillo's accomplice, Leniz "La Diablita" Escobar, was found guilty and faces life in prison.

On January 9, 2019, three high school students who came to the United States illegally as youths were arrested and charged with the stabbing of another teen after school in Central Islip, New York; they were also charged with being members of MS-13. On January 29, they were arraigned.

On February 2, 2019, an MS-13 member fatally shot a member of the rival 18th Street Gang on the New York City Subway's 90th Street–Elmhurst Avenue station in Queens. On the same day graffiti with the gang's name was scrawled on the wall outside the district office of local city council member Francisco Moya. President Trump mentioned the incident in his 2019 State of the Union Address. Immigration Customs and Enforcement confirmed that the suspected murderer was an undocumented immigrant.

Suffolk County District Attorney Timothy D. Sini announced on December 20, 2019, that nine leaders and 45 members of MS-13, plus 19 drug dealers, have been arrested after a 23-month investigation. Twenty-three others were arrested elsewhere in New York State, and 134 in El Salvador.

==== Child prostitution ====
In 2011, Alonso "Casper" Bruno Cornejo Ormeno, an associate of MS-13 from Fairfax, Virginia, was sentenced to 24 years in prison for child prostitution. Ormeno recruited juvenile females into a prostitution ring by locating runaway children.

Rances Ulices Amaya, a leader of MS-13, of Springfield, Virginia, was convicted in February 2012 for trafficking girls as young as 14 into a prostitution ring. He was sentenced in June 2012 to 50 years in prison for child prostitution. The girls were lured from middle schools, high schools, and public shelters. Once acquired by Amaya, they were required to have sex with as many as ten men per day.

In September 2012, Yimmy Anthony Pineda Penado (also known as "Critico" and "Spike") of Maryland, a former "clique leader" of MS-13, became the eleventh member of the gang to be convicted of child prostitution since 2011.

==== Charlotte, North Carolina ====
In the first decade of the 21st century, U.S. authorities investigated MS-13 in Charlotte, North Carolina. The work eventually led to charges against 26 MS-13 members, including seven trial convictions in January 2010, 18 guilty pleas, and 11 multi-year prison sentences.

==== Alejandro Enrique Ramirez Umaña ====
Alejandro Enrique Ramirez Umaña, also known as "Wizard", was the first MS-13 member to be sentenced to death by the United States federal government. In 2005, in Los Angeles, according to a jury in a later sentencing phase, Umaña murdered Jose Herrera and Gustavo Porras on July 27, and participated in and aided and abetted the killing of Andy Abarca on September 28. He later came to Charlotte, North Carolina, according to witnesses, as a veteran member of MS-13, to reorganize the Charlotte cell of the gang.

According to witnesses at his trial on December 8, 2007, while in the Las Jarochitas, a family-run restaurant in Greensboro, North Carolina, Umaña shot Ruben Garcia Salinas fatally in the chest and Manuel Garcia Salinas in the head. Witnesses testified that the shootings took place after the Garcia Salinas brothers had "disrespected" Umaña's gang signs by calling them "fake". Firing three more shots in the restaurant, according to trial testimony, Umaña injured another person with his gunfire. Trial testimony and evidence showed that Umaña later fled back to Charlotte with MS-13 assistance. Umaña was arrested five days later in possession of the murder weapon. Additional evidence and testimony from the trial revealed that Umaña coordinated attempts to kill witnesses and informants while he was incarcerated awaiting trial.

Umaña was indicted by a federal grand jury on June 23, 2008. During the trial, he attempted to bring a knife with him into the courtroom, which was discovered by U.S. Marshals before he was transported to the courthouse. Thousands of hours were spent on the case over several years. International work was also involved. On April 19, 2010, the jury convicted Umaña of multiple charges of murder, and additionally found him responsible for the 2005 murders during the sentencing phase. On April 28, a 12-person federal jury in Charlotte voted unanimously to impose the death penalty. On July 27, 2010, Chief U.S. District Judge Robert J. Conrad Jr., of Charlotte, North Carolina, formally imposed the federal death penalty sentence. The case was automatically appealed under Federal Rules of Criminal Procedure. The sentence was upheld in April 2014.

On December 23, 2024, President Joe Biden commuted the death sentences of Umaña and 36 other federal death row prisoners to life sentences without the possibility of parole.

==== Terrorism charges ====
On July 15, 2020, during a White House press conference, Attorney General William Barr announced that the Department of Justice had filed terrorism charges against Armando Eliu Melgar Diaz, a Honduran native who moved from the United States back to his home country in 2016. The announcement marked the first time the DOJ had used terrorism charges against MS-13 according to a Washington Post story. At the same press conference, Barr also announced the arrests of 21 other suspected MS-13 gang members in New York and Nevada. During the session, Barr told the press while MS-13 was involved in drug dealing, making money from drugs was neither a substantial source of revenue for MS-13 nor one of their objectives, "MS-13 is somewhat unique in this sense: they have the street savagery that you would see in a gang is not driven by commercial interests the way, for example, the mafia traditionally was. It's about honor of being the most savage, bloodthirsty person you can be and building up a reputation as a killer." President Trump, during the same press conference, stated that "We're using 'terrorism' which gives us extra strength. We've done a great job with MS-13, but now we're stepping it up to an even higher level."

==== Developments in Spain ====
Under the coordination of the gang's leadership in El Salvador, Mara Salvatrucha formed five clicas in Spain as part of the gang's Programa 34 ("Program 34") expansionist program. The cliques – "Providence" in Madrid, "Normandi" in Girona, "Dementes Locos" and "Demonios Locos" in Barcelona, and "Big Crazy" in Ibi – were provided with financial and logistical support by MS-13's leaders and were focused on operating legitimate businesses, such as bars and restaurants, which could be used for money laundering and to provide employment and visas in Spain for formerly incarcerated Salvadoran gang members. The gang's Spanish-based operations were financed primarily by the sale of marijuana and cocaine, as well as with monthly dues paid by members. The National Police Corps began an investigation, known as operation Cruasan ("Croissant"), into MS-13 in late 2012 after a young man was stabbed in a fight involving rival gangs. On March 24, 2014, the investigation culminated with the arrests of 35 Mara Salvatrucha members in the provinces of Alicante, Barcelona, Girona, Madrid and Tarragona in an operation involving approximately 300 officers of the Civil Guard.

The gang members were charged with various offences, including money laundering, attempt and conspiracy to murder, drug trafficking and illegal firearms possession. The most significant charges in the case were brought against Esteban Arnulfo Naviti Mejía, aka "Darkin", and Pablo Antonio Naviti Mejía, aka "Big Man", who led the "Big Crazy" clique and allegedly ordered the murder of a rival gang member in late 2013 as well as the murder of a witness in a case that implicated MS-13 in early 2014. The trial of the 35 accused commenced in Alicante on February 20, 2018.

==== 2021 MacArthur Park attacks ====
In 2021, two transgender women in MacArthur Park, Los Angeles, were assaulted and stabbed at night within the park. The attacks drew condemnation from a multitude of advocacy groups, and, with the two attacks so closely linked, resulted in heavy police presence within MacArthur Park. The women had been forced to pay MS-13 members a weekly "tax" for permission to be in the park, according to police reports and victim interviews, for the right to be left alone by the gang. MS-13 reportedly had been extracting this fee over numerous people to regulate illicit commerce within the area, as MacArthur Park is a significant source of revenue in the center of the gang's territory. Violence against trans women in the area had largely started with the closure of a nearby bar, frequented by Latina transgender immigrants who had turned to sex work to survive, and their relocation of operations to the much more dangerous MacArthur Park after said closure.

The victim, Daniela Hernandez, herself a Salvadorean who had immigrated to the city illegally, had struggled to pay the weekly fee of $20 after losing her job as a janitor, and had believed the gang singled her out due to her status as a transgender woman. This continued for about three months, until she had eventually decided to stop paying the fee for the gang, where afterwards she was assaulted and stabbed near a lake and discovered with numerous wounds near Union Station. Surviving, she resumed paying the weekly fee, until four weeks afterwards she had been in the park with her throat slit and with 15 stab wounds. The resulting publicity of the attacks led to increased police activity in the park, to a point where much of MS-13 operating in the area had relocated to 10th Street.

== In film ==
- La Vida Loca, a 2008 documentary film by Christian Poveda.
- Some of the characters of the feature movie Sin Nombre (2009) are members of MS-13 in Chiapas, Mexico, and many of the traditions and practices of MS-13 are depicted. In particular, the film focuses on four members of MS-13 who live in the city of Tapachula, Chiapas, Mexico (a Mexican border town located near the Mexico-Guatemala border): the film's protagonist Willy, aka "El Casper" (played by Edgar Flores), his pupil Benito, aka "El Smiley" (played by Kristyan Ferrer) and two of the gang's leaders, "Lil Mago" (played by Tenoch Huerta) and "El Sol" (played by Luis Fernando Peña).
- Violence by MS-13 against immigrants on the Guatemala–Mexico border is portrayed in the movie La vida precoz y breve de Sabina Rivas (2012), as one of the film's two main characters, Jovany (played by Fernando Moreno) is a teenage member of MS-13 who is the boyfriend of the film's protagonist, Sabina Rivas (played by Greisy Mena)
- National Geographic created a documentary in 2005 titled World's Most Dangerous Gang, portraying MS-13.
- The 2007 season of the History Channel's television series Gangland included two full episodes covering MS-13: Episode 2, "You Rat, You Die", about former gang member turned informant Brenda Paz, who had been supplying the authorities with firsthand accounts of MS-13's operations and was later found dead; and episode 13, "Root of All Evil", about the drugs and prostitution rackets run by MS-13.
- The 2019 action film We Die Young (starring Jean-Claude Van Damme) focuses on two members of the Washington D.C. branch of MS-13: Lucas (played by Elijah Rodriguez), a teenage member of the gang who, with the help of the film's protagonist, Daniel (played by Van Damme), tries at all costs to prevent his younger brother from becoming a gangster, and the film's antagonist, "Rincon" (played by David Castañeda), the powerful and bloodthirsty leader of MS-13 in Washington.
- Two season 7 episodes of FBI True that premiered on Paramount + on May 20, 2025, chronicled efforts the FBI and Massachusetts State Police to combat MS-13 in the greater Boston area during the early 2000s.

== See also ==
- 18th Street gang
- Gangs in the United States
- List of California street gangs
- List of criminal enterprises, gangs and syndicates
- Organized crime
- Racketeer Influenced and Corrupt Organizations Act (RICO)
- Designated Foreign Terrorist Organization
- Deportation of Kilmar Abrego Garcia
