= Ruja Ignatova =

Bulgarian and German fraudster (born 1980)

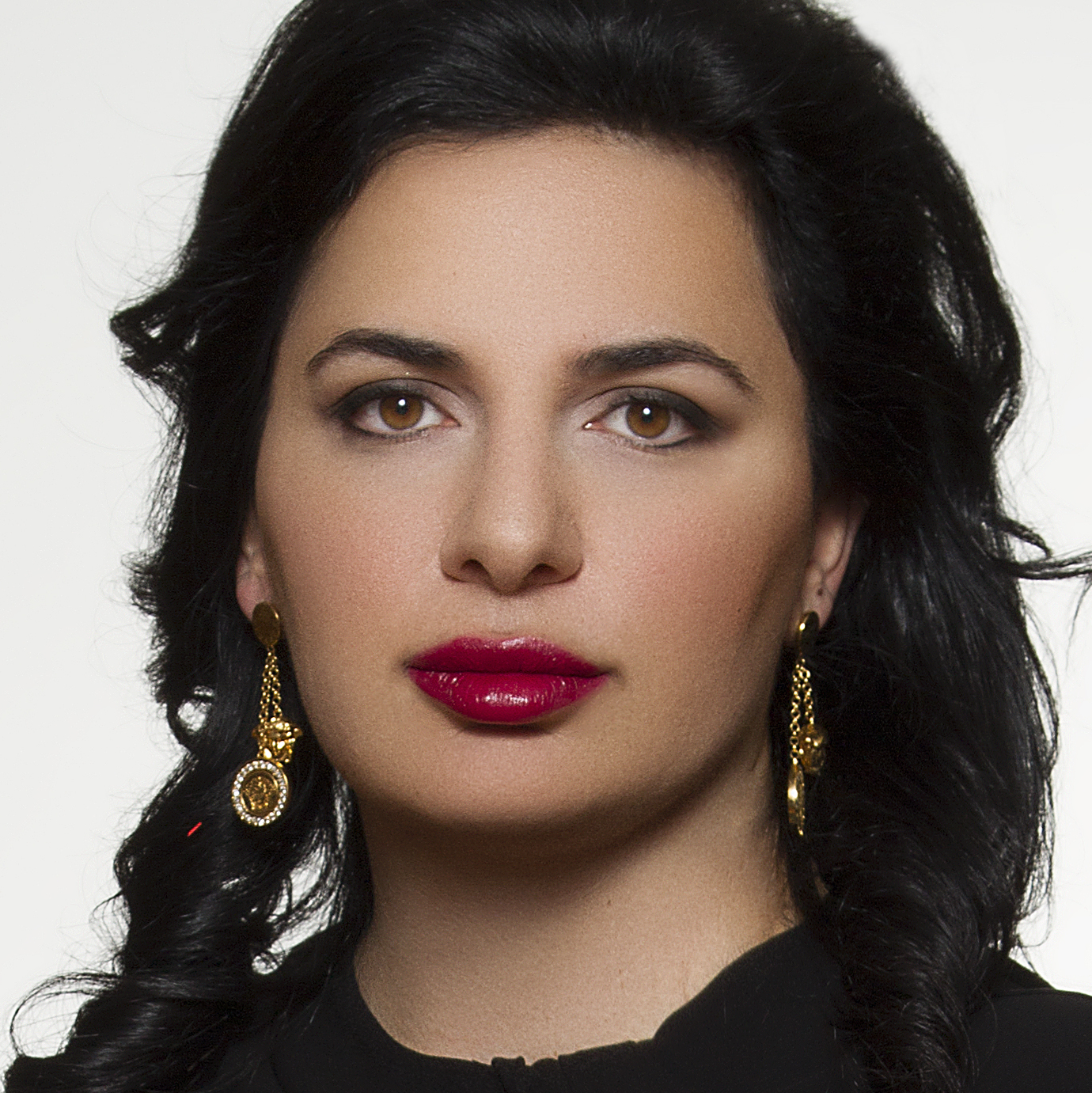
- OneCoin company portrait of Ignatova, 2015

FBI Ten Most Wanted Fugitive
- Reward: $5,000,000
- Alias: Cryptoqueen

Description
- Born: Ruja Plamenova Ignatova; May 30, 1980 (age 46); Ruse, Bulgaria
- Nationality: Bulgarian (formerly); German

Status
- Status: Wanted by the ICPO and FBI
- Added: June 30, 2022
- Number: 527
- Currently a Top Ten Fugitive

Ruja Plamenova Ignatova (Note: Bulgarian: Ружа Пламенова Игнатова, romanized: Ruža Plamenova Ignatova, occasionally transliterated as Ruga Ignatova) (born May 30, 1980 – disappeared October 25, 2017), also known by the nickname "Cryptoqueen", is a Bulgarian-German entrepreneur and con artist. She is one of the FBI Ten Most Wanted Fugitives, and is best known as the founder of the fraudulent cryptocurrency scheme OneCoin, which The Times described as "one of the biggest scams in history." She was the subject of the 2019 BBC podcast series The Missing Cryptoqueen and the 2022 book of the same name. There have been no confirmed sightings of Ignatova since she boarded a Ryanair flight from Sofia to Athens on October 25, 2017.

Since her disappearance, Ignatova has long been presumed to be on the run from various international law enforcement agencies. The FBI has offered up to five million dollars for any information leading to her arrest. On March 7, 2019, an indictment was unsealed in which the United States charged Ignatova with wire fraud, securities fraud and money laundering. The FBI added Ignatova to the Ten Most Wanted Fugitives list in June 2022. Ignatova is the subject of an Interpol warrant issued by German authorities.

Reporting in 2023 and 2024 suggested that Ignatova may have been murdered in 2018 on the orders of Bulgarian organised crime figure "Taki" Hristoforos Nikos Amanatidis, who is suspected of initially sheltering her.

== Early life and education ==
Ignatova was born on May 30, 1980, in Ruse, Bulgaria. Her father, Plamen, was a mechanical engineer; her mother, Veska, was a nursery school teacher. Her family is Romani. She has a younger brother, Konstantin, known as "Konsti". After the fall of the Iron Curtain, Ignatova emigrated to Germany with her family in 1990 and spent the remainder of her childhood in a small apartment in Schramberg.

Ignatova performed well in school, skipping a grade, and was described by a Schramberg teacher as the smartest student he taught. She was considered arrogant by her classmates; in a schoolbook, she described herself:

[...] always well behaved and cheerful [...] faultless [...] Stop! Maybe we should stick to the truth? OK, fine. Maybe I did take pleasure in tormenting some students. I was always looking for the chance to spread new amusing stories about them.

At the age of 18, she received a scholarship to the University of Konstanz. While a student, she was briefly a student representative for the Christian Democratic Union. She graduated in 2005 with a PhD in private international law with the dissertation Art. 5 Nr. 1 EuGVO – Chancen und Perspektiven der Reform des Gerichtsstands am Erfüllungsort, which discusses lex causae in conflict of laws. She later earned a Master's degree in European law at Oxford University. She then returned to Bulgaria and worked as a consultant in the Sofia office of McKinsey & Company. After the Sofia office closed in 2009 amid the Great Recession, Ignatova purchased property near Frankfurt and contemplated returning to Germany, but ultimately stayed in Bulgaria.

== Criminal activities ==
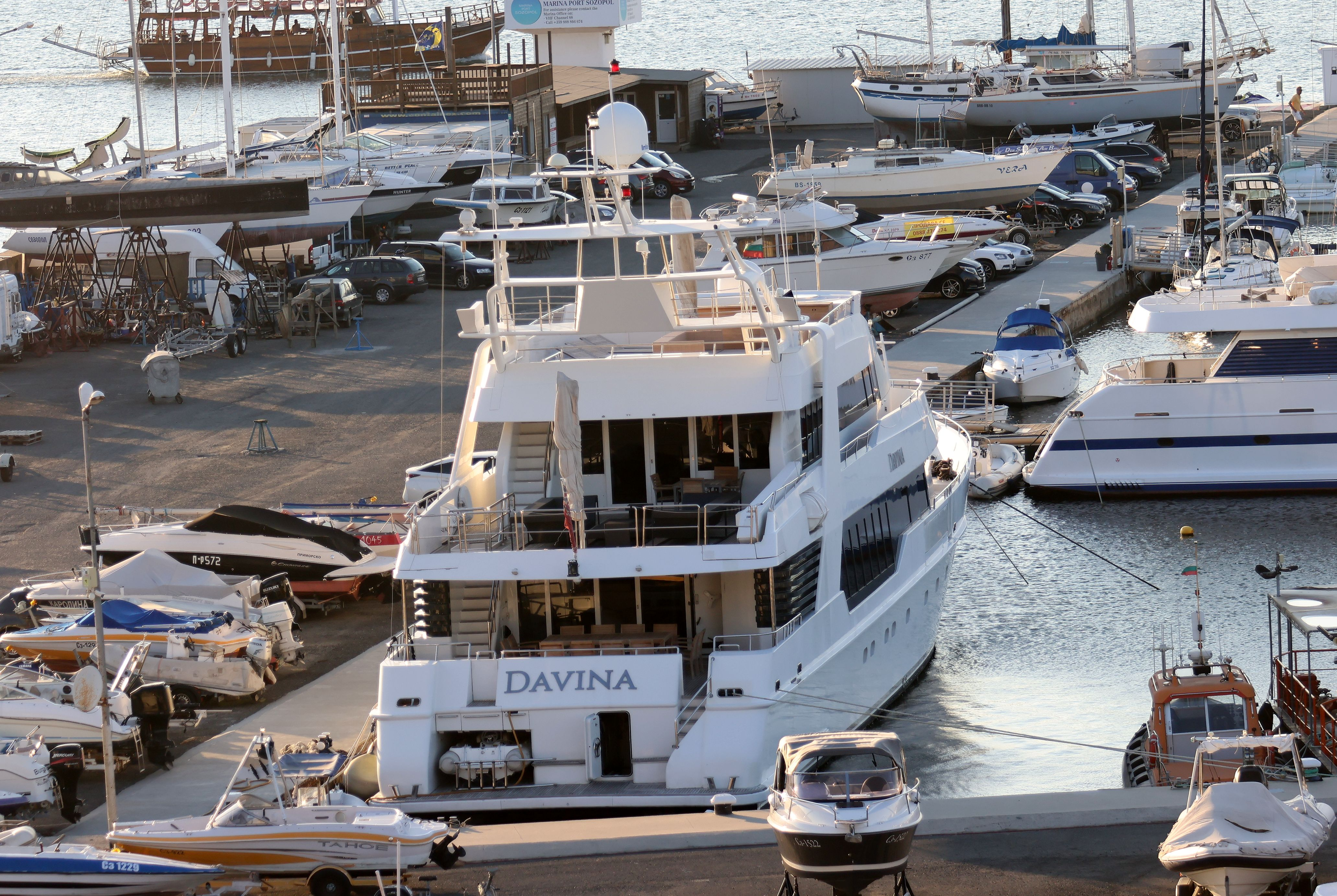
The 44-metre (144 ft 4 in) motor yacht 'Davina' (ex. Lambda Mar) was owned by Ruja Ignatova.

In 2012, she was convicted of fraud in Germany in connection with her father Plamen Ignatov's acquisition of a company that shortly afterwards was declared bankrupt under dubious circumstances; she was given a suspended sentence of 14 months' imprisonment. In 2013, she was involved with a multi-level marketing scam called BigCoin.

In 2014, she founded a pyramid scheme called OneCoin. Inspired by the success of Bitcoin, she claimed that OneCoin was a simpler and safer alternative to the more well-known cryptocurrency. She claimed that investors simply had to send money into a bank account to receive OneCoin. Due to its structure as a pyramid scheme, the scam rapidly grew in popularity across the world. OneCoin was not a real cryptocurrency, and the claims she made about the coin's increasing value were lies. Wealthy investors lost millions of dollars and investors in rural Uganda lost their homes. The vast majority of investment came from mainland China, although investments had also been made from countries such as Brazil, Pakistan, Hong Kong, Norway, Canada, Yemen, and Palestine.

== Investigation and disappearance ==
An episode of the FBI's series "Inside the FBI" about Ruja Ignatova and how she allegedly robbed investors of billions of dollars

On October 25, 2017, Ignatova was scheduled to speak to an audience of OneCoin investors in Lisbon. Instead, she traveled from Sofia, Bulgaria to Athens, on a Ryanair flight, then disappeared; she may have been tipped off about increasing police investigations into OneCoin. In 2019, her brother Konstantin Ignatov pleaded guilty to fraud and money laundering in connection with the scheme. Bulgaria's Bureau of Investigative Reporting and Data (BIRD), an independent journalistic organization, alleged that a Bulgarian organized crime kingpin, Krasmir Kamenov, (Note: Krasmir Kamenov was nicknamed Kuro (Bulgarian: Красимир Каменов – Къро). He allegedly was part of the VIS-2 strike brigade (Bulgarian: ВИС) with Christoforos Amanatidis nicknamed Taki (Bulgarian: Христофорос Аманатидис – Таки). Kuro died with his wife and another Bulgarian man and woman, one of which was his child, at Kuro's home in Constantia, Cape Town, South Africa, on 25 May 2023 before Kuro could assist United States investigators.) wanted to support a United States investigation into Ignatova’s disappearance, but was killed before he could assist American officials. (Note: Allegedly, Frank Schneider (born 1970 or 1971), who formerly was Luxembourg's foreign intelligence chief at Service de Renseignement de l'État (SREL) until his dismissal from SREL in 2008 due to a domestic wiretapping scandal and worked closely with Marco Mille who was the director of SREL in the early 2000s, supports the interests of Ignatova. In 2019, United States prosecutors alleged that Frank Schneider provided Ignatova with confidential police information which could have allowed her to escape police arrest and detention; however, Schneider denies the allegation.)

In 2022, prosecutors in Darmstadt, Germany confirmed an investigation of "a lawyer from Neu-Isenburg" for possible money laundering: the transfer of 7.69 million euros by Ignatova into one of her private accounts in 2016. In January 2022, police searched apartments and offices in Weilburg, Baden-Baden, Frankfurt am Main, Bad Homburg, Neu-Isenburg and Vaihingen.

Afterwards, the North Rhine-Westphalia Police and German Federal Criminal Police Office announced that Ignatova is sought for fraud charges. The Federal Criminal Police Office announced a €5,000 reward for information leading to an arrest. An Interpol Red Notice followed. This was reciprocated by Europol adding Ignatova to its 'most wanted' list; however, Deutsche Welle reported that the Europol listing was removed under unknown circumstances.

The US Federal Bureau of Investigation added Ignatova to its Ten Most Wanted Fugitives list, replacing Octaviano Juarez-Corro, and announced this at a joint press conference with IRS Criminal Investigation and United States Attorney's Office Southern District of New York. The FBI followed up with an episode of its podcast and YouTube series Inside the FBI devoted to Ignatova and the OneCoin case. As of May 2022, there was a reward of up to $250,000 for information leading to Ignatova's arrest; in June 2024, the reward was increased to $5,000,000. In August 2024, a "UK court ordered a global asset freeze for [Ignatova] and her OneCoin associates".

In a 2022 interview with FBI Special Agent Paul Roberts, he said that the agency's investigation into Ignatova was "operating under the assumption that she is still alive" and that the agency had "no information" to counter that belief. In his 2022 book The Missing Cryptoqueen, Jamie Bartlett suggested she may be living in Dubai or on a yacht in the Mediterranean. Bulgarian investigative reporting site Bureau of Investigative Reporting and Data – BIRD published a 2023 report on Bulgarian police documents in which a police informant overheard Georgi Vasilev, brother-in-law of the Bulgarian drug lord "Taki" Hristoforos Amanatidis, saying (in an intoxicated state) that Ignatova was murdered in November 2018 on Taki's orders. The alleged murderer, Hristo Hristov, who is also Bulgarian, is serving a sentence in a Dutch prison for drug trafficking. According to the report, Ignatova was murdered aboard a yacht in the Ionian Sea, and her body was dismembered and thrown overboard. The alleged motive for the murder was to conceal Taki's involvement in the OneCoin scam. The BBC reported that multiple sources linked Ignatova to Taki, who was allegedly the godfather of her daughter.

Ignatova was the subject of a 2022 book titled The Missing Cryptoqueen by journalist Jamie Bartlett. In June 2026, following an investigation into Ignatova's money laundering activities by the Guernsey Economic and Financial Crime Bureau, the Royal Court of Guernsey determined that £8.59 million held in Ignatova's RBS International on Guernsey could be released to compensate victims of her scam. Ignatova was issued a forfeiture order by the Guernsey Royal Court in 2025, which she failed to respond to.

== Personal life ==
Ignatova married Björn Strehl, a German lawyer. Their daughter was born in 2016. According to the BBC, multiple interviewed sources claimed that "Taki" Hristoforos Nikos Amanatidis is the godfather of Ignatova's daughter.

== See also ==
- List of fugitives from justice who disappeared
- FBI Ten Most Wanted Fugitives, 2020s
