= Trung Duc Lu =

Vietnamese fugitive (born 1980)

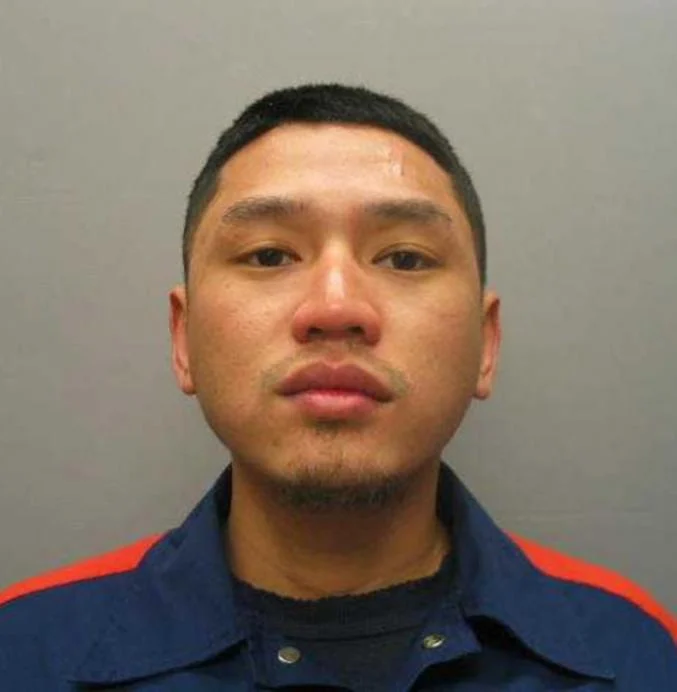

FBI Ten Most Wanted Fugitive
- Charges: Conspiracy to Commit Kidnapping; Kidnapping (3 counts); Interstate Travel in Aid of Racketeering; Conspiracy to Collect an Extension of Credit by Extortionate Means; Collection of Extension of Credit by Extortionate Means; Conspiracy to Distribute Marijuana; Aiding and Abetting
- Reward: $1,000,000
- Alias: Trung D. Lu; Tuan Hoang; Phong Le; Phong Van Le; Brendan Lu; Calvin Lu; Trung Lu; Duc Trung; Duc L. Trung; Lu Trung; "B"

Description
- Born: October 1, 1980 (age 45); Vietnam
- Nationality: Vietnamese
- Gender: Male
- Height: 5 ft 7 in (170 cm)
- Weight: 140 lb (64 kg)
- Occupation: Nail technician

Status
- Added: March 11, 2026
- Number: 539
- Currently a Top Ten Fugitive

Trung Duc Lu (Vietnamese: Lư Đức Trung; born October 1, 1980) is a Vietnamese criminal suspected of involvement in a double homicide in Philadelphia, Pennsylvania, United States, on August 27, 2014.

The murders pertained to a drug debt owed to the Vietnamese "Born to Kill" street gang based in New York. Lu is the last individual suspected of direct involvement in the case who has not been convicted.

On March 11, 2026, Lu was placed on the FBI's Ten Most Wanted Fugitives list and is currently believed by American authorities to be in Vietnam.

== Background ==
Lu was born in Vietnam in 1980, though he also uses birth dates between 1979 and 1982. He moved to the United States as a teenager. Residing in Queens, New York City, Lu is alleged to have been a member of the Vietnamese "Born to Kill" street gang (also known as "BTK" or the "Canal Boys").

== 2014 double homicide ==
According to authorities, two Vietnamese brothers involved in the marijuana trade, Vu and Viet Huynh, and their acquaintance, Thanh Voong, received a large quantity of the drug from the "Born to Kill" gang to sell in Philadelphia on consignment; though after it was sold, they gambled away most of the proceeds.

In August 2014, the gang sent Lu and two other members, Jason Rivera and John Dao, from New York City to Philadelphia to collect the drug debt, which exceeded $100,000. There, the Huynhs and Voong were lured to a home in Southwest Philadelphia owned by local gang contact Tam Le, where they were tied up and beaten in his garage before being brought to a parking lot on the Schuylkill River. After $40,000 was recovered and all three were repeatedly stabbed, they were tossed into the river with buckets of cement tied to their bodies. Voong survived the attack and swam out of the river, after which he notified police and led them to the crime scene.

Authorities believe that Lu left the United States for Vietnam shortly after the incident. In July 2019, he was charged in absentia.

On March 11, 2026, Lu was placed on the FBI's Ten Most Wanted Fugitives list; the FBI believes he is living in Vietnam and is offering up to $1,000,000 for information leading to his capture.

== Other convictions ==
Tam Le was convicted and sentenced to death for his role in the murders and died behind bars in February 2025. Jason Rivera and John Dao were also convicted, as was gang member Minh Nguyen for his involvement and their drug suppliers, Lam Trieu of New York and "Fat Man" of California.

== See also ==
- FBI Ten Most Wanted Fugitives, 2020s
