= Cindy Rodriguez Singh =

American fugitive and murder suspect

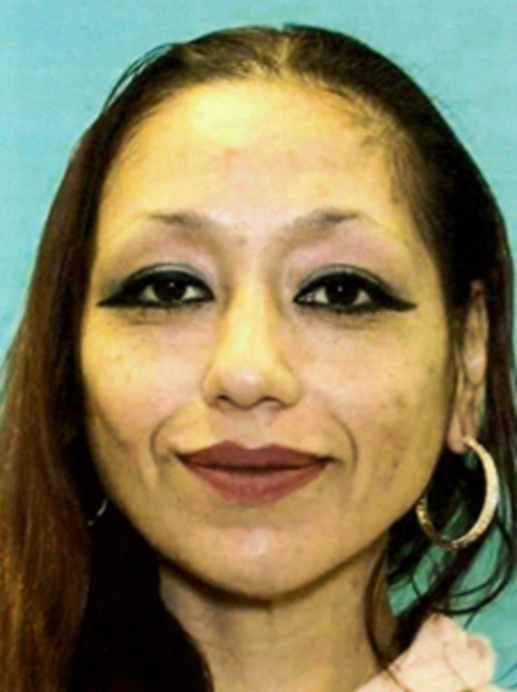
- FBI photo of Rodriguez Singh

FBI Ten Most Wanted Fugitive
- Charges: Capital murder
- Reward: $250,000
- Alias: Cindy Cecilia Rodriguez

Description
- Born: January 30, 1985 (age 41); Dallas, Texas, U.S.
- Race: Hispanic
- Gender: Female
- Spouse: Arshdeep Singh
- Children: 10

Status
- Added: July 1, 2025
- Caught: August 20, 2025
- Number: 537
- Captured

Cindy Rodriguez Singh (born January 30, 1985) is an American former fugitive indicted on charges of murdering her six-year-old son Noel Rodriguez-Alvarez. On July 1, 2025, she was added to the FBI Ten Most Wanted Fugitives list, wanted for capital murder and unlawful flight. Authorities speculated that she may have traveled to either India or Mexico.

The FBI announced her capture on August 20, 2025, in New Delhi, India. She was extradited to the United States and held in jail on a ten-million-dollar bond.

== Background ==
Cindy Rodriguez Singh gave birth to Noel Angel Rodriguez-Alvarez on February 2, 2017. Noel was born premature and had several physical and developmental disabilities, including visual impairment, a limp, speech delay, esotropia and chronic lung disease, which required regular treatment. Rodriguez Singh reportedly shunned her son as "evil" and "possessed by a demon". She was alleged to have abused Rodriguez-Alvarez by depriving him of water and food to avoid having to change his diaper. Rodriguez Singh was known to beat her son with a set of keys when she caught him drinking water.

In 2020, Rodriguez Singh was sentenced to a ten-year probation, following a conviction for a repeat offense of driving while intoxicated after she crashed her car into a pole while driving with two of her children. Between 2020 and December 2021, three of her children, including Rodriguez-Alvarez, were put in a foster family before being returned to Rodriguez Singh. Three other children remained with their grandparents.

By fall 2022, Rodriguez-Alvarez had not been entered into compulsory schooling and lapsed scheduled doctor's appointments beginning July 2022. His mother had once asked an acquaintance to "borrow" their child for a medical visit during this time.

== Murder ==
According to police, Noel Rodriguez-Alvarez was not seen alive since November 2022. He had been last spotted in mid-October 2022 while staying at a hospital for the birth of his twin sisters, where he was noted as "appearing unhealthy and malnourished". Between November 1–2, 2022, Rodriguez Singh applied for passports for her children, not including Rodriguez-Alvarez. According to her sister, Rodriguez Singh feared that the Texas Department of Family and Protective Services would take away her other children, which had occurred before due to her history of drug and alcohol problems. Shortly before her own disappearance, she had told her mother and brother that she sold her son to another woman on the parking lot of a Fiesta Mart.

A welfare check was conducted at the family home in Everman, Texas, on March 20, 2023. Rodriguez Singh falsely told police that her son was living in Mexico with relatives of his father, who had been deported. Two days later, on March 22, her husband, Arshdeep Singh, who was the stepfather of Noel, stole $10,000 from his workplace, $8,000 of which he deposited at a bank. The same day, Rodriguez Singh, Singh, and six of their children drove to Dallas Fort Worth Airport, where they boarded a flight to Istanbul, Turkey. Authorities believed they have travelled further to India, based on previous internet searches.

On March 25, an Amber alert was issued for Noel Alvarez-Rodriguez. On March 30, 2023, a felony warrant was issued for Cindy and Arshdeep Singh for abandoning and endangering a child. On October 30, Rodriguez Singh was indicted for capital murder, two counts of injury to a child, and one count of abandoning without the intent to return.

Before the family's disappearance, Rodriguez Singh had commissioned the construction of a concrete patio. Her husband also threw away a carpet, later found to contain traces of human remains, that previously furnished a shed later demolished by the couple. Sniffer dogs similarly detected human remains at the patio. However, demolition of the patio and a wider search of the area surrounding the home did not find a body. According to investigations by the Everman police, Rodriguez Singh idolized Santa Muerte as "the patron saint that offers protection to the cartel and those kinds of activities." According to Chief Spencer of the Everman police: "It’s everywhere within the shed. It was everywhere within the home, it was on her vehicle, so it was pretty evident to us she was idolizing and worshiping [Santa Muerte]."

In May 2023, a playground catering to children with severe disabilities in Everman's Clyde Pittman Park was named "Noel Angel Alvarez Playground" after Noel Rodriguez-Alvarez. The Everman City Council replaced his middle name, "Rodriguez", with "Angel" to disassociate this gesture from Cindy. The new playground is an expansion of an existing facility and was inaugurated on November 20 of the same year.

On July 1, 2025, she was added to the FBI Ten Most Wanted Fugitives list, replacing Vitel'Homme Innocent. On August 20, 2025, it was announced that Rodriguez Singh had been apprehended a few days earlier in New Delhi, India, by local authorities. She was extradited to the United States shortly after her arrest and booked into Tarrant County jail. She is being held on a ten million dollar bond.

On April 6, 2026, she was found incompetent to stand trial and is currently being held while undergoing treatment until it is determined that she is capable of assisting in her own defense.

On May 15, 2026, the body of Rodriguez-Alvarez was found behind Rodriguez Singh's house.
