= Donald Eugene Fields II =

American criminal and former fugitive

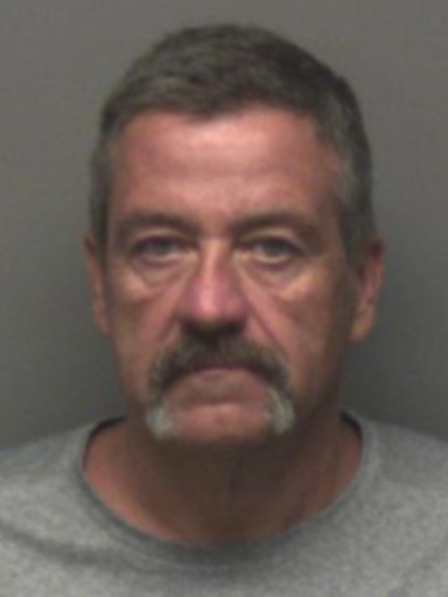
- Fields in 2021

FBI Ten Most Wanted Fugitive
- Charges: Child sex trafficking
- Reward: $250,000
- Alias: Don Fields; Donald Eugene Fields Jr.; Eugene Fields; Walter Long

Description
- Born: July 9, 1964 (age 62); Kentucky, United States
- Race: White
- Gender: Male
- Height: 6 ft 0 in – 6 ft 4 in (183–193 cm)
- Weight: 219–235 lb (99–107 kg)

Status
- Added: May 25, 2023
- Caught: January 25, 2025
- Number: 531
- Captured

Donald Eugene Fields II (born July 9, 1964) is an American former fugitive who was added to the FBI Ten Most Wanted Fugitives list on May 25, 2023. Fields had been wanted for the sex trafficking of at least one child between 2013 and 2017 in Missouri. Fields was the 531st fugitive to be placed on the FBI's Ten Most Wanted list. On January 25, 2025, Fields was captured in Lady Lake, Florida, following a traffic stop.

== Background ==
Fields was born in Kentucky, on July 9, 1964. At the time of his disappearance, he lived in Union, Missouri in the Greater St. Louis area, where he worked as a tree trimmer and an independent used car dealer.

== Crimes ==
Between 2013 and 2017, Fields allegedly participated in a child sex trafficking ring. He is accused of "knowingly attempting to recruit, entice, provide, patronize and solicit a minor into engaging in a commercial sex act." According to Assistant U.S. Attorney Diana Collins, Fields allegedly received money, motorcycles, vacations, and Christmas presents from Theodore John Sartori Sr. in exchange for access with the minor. Fields is suspected to have committed the same crimes to two other people during the same time period.

Fields has also been charged with 15 counts related to child sexual abuse and witness tampering in the Missouri Circuit Court system.

== Disappearance ==
Fields and Sartori were indicted on December 7, 2022, with one count of child sex trafficking each. Sartori was arrested later that same month, and pleaded not guilty. Until his capture, Fields' location had not been known after he failed to appear for a court hearing on March 3, 2022. Fields had family in Missouri and Kentucky, and had traveled to Florida (where he was eventually arrested) in the past. He was known to visit casinos. Jennifer Isgriggs (alias Jennifer Fields), a Phelps County fugitive and Fields' suspected romantic partner, was suspected by the Phelps County Prosecuting Attorney of evading law enforcement alongside Fields.

On May 25, 2023, Fields was added to the FBI's Ten Most Wanted Fugitives list, replacing Michael James Pratt, a pornographer accused of sex trafficking and child pornography offenses who was captured in 2022.

== Capture ==
Body camera footage of the detainment of Fields

On January 25, 2025, Fields was apprehended by Lady Lake Police Sergeant Michelle Bilbrey during a traffic stop, after Bilbrey discovered Fields' license plate was unregistered. Fields identified himself with the expired Missouri driver's license of Walter Long, who bore resemblance to him. He was then identified as Fields and arrested without incident. He was initially incarcerated at the Lake County Jail in Lake County, Florida, where he awaited extradition to Missouri. Fields pled guilty on one count of child sex trafficking and was sentenced to 20 years in federal prison on July 16, 2026.
