= Giovanni Vicente Mosquera Serrano =

Venezuelan gang leader

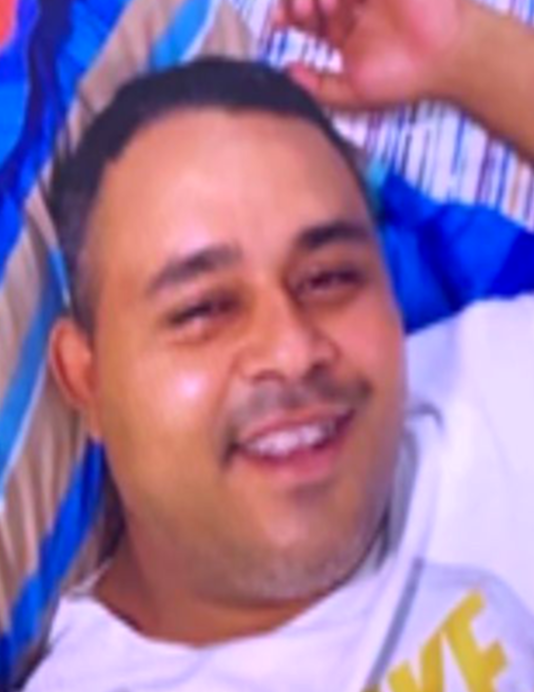
- FBI photo of Serrano

FBI Ten Most Wanted Fugitive
- Charges: International cocaine distribution conspiracy; International cocaine distribution; Providing material support to a foreign terrorist organization conspiracy; Providing and attempting to provide material support to a foreign terrorist organization
- Reward: $5,000,000
- Alias: El Viejo; Giovanny San Vicente

Description
- Born: February 22, 1988 (age 37); Maracay, Aragua, Venezuela
- Race: Hispanic
- Gender: Male

Status
- Added: June 24, 2025
- Number: 536
- Currently a Top Ten Fugitive

Giovanni Vicente Mosquera Serrano (born February 22, 1988) is a Venezuelan alleged gang leader associated with Tren de Aragua. On June 24, 2025 he was sanctioned by the US government and added to the FBI Ten Most Wanted Fugitives list, wanted for drug dealing and terrorism, replacing Francisco Javier Roman-Bardales.

== Biography ==
Mosquera Serrano was born in the San Vicente barrio of Maracay. Along with Yohan José Romero ("Johan Petrica"), he is an alleged founder of Tren de Aragua, led by principal founder Héctor Rusthenford Guerrero Flores ("Niño Guerrero"), while incarcerated at the largely gang-controlled Tocorón Prison. As "Giovanny San Vicente", Mosquera Serrano has been described as overseeing narcotics trafficking and murders connected to the Tren de Aragua across Central America, Colombia, and the United States. As with Romero and Guerrero Flores, he has been wanted for arrest by the governments of Colombia and the United States since July 2024.

Mosquera Serrano is charged with providing material support to a designated foreign terrorist organization, and distribution of cocaine in Colombia intended for distribution in the United States, along with another suspected Tren de Aragua leader, Jose Enrique Martinez Flores, who was already arrested in Colombia on March 31, 2025.

Mosquera Serrano was sanctioned on by the United States on June 24, 2025, indicted in the U.S. for drug trafficking, and a $3 million reward was offered for information leading to his arrest.
