= Octaviano Juarez-Corro =

Mexican-American fugitive (1973–2023)

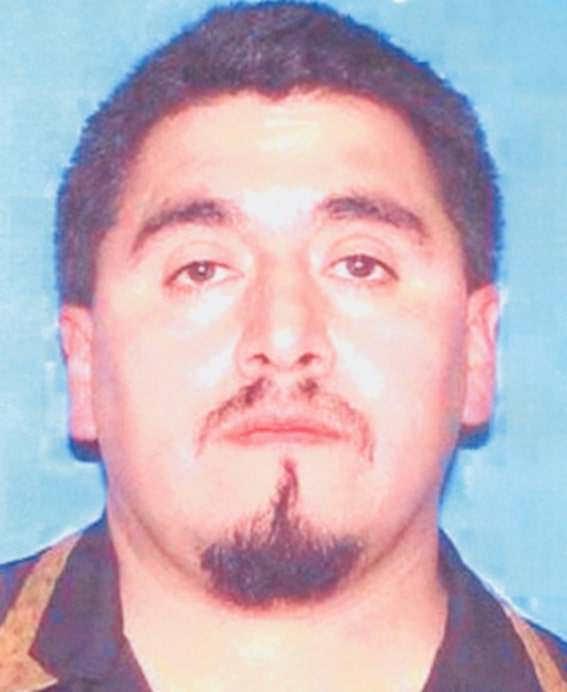
- Photograph taken in 2006

FBI Ten Most Wanted Fugitive
- Charges: Unlawful Flight to Avoid Prosecution; First Degree Intentional Homicide; First Degree Attempted Intentional Homicide
- Reward: $100,000
- Alias: Octaviano Corro; Octaviano Juarez Corro; Octavio Juarez

Description
- Born: December 22, 1973; Mexico
- Died: January 22, 2023 (aged 49); Milwaukee County Jail, Milwaukee, Wisconsin, U.S.
- Gender: Male
- Height: 5 ft 5 in (165 cm) to 5 ft 7 in (170 cm)
- Weight: 180–200 lb (82–91 kg)

Status
- Added: September 8, 2021
- Caught: February 3, 2022
- Number: 525
- Captured

Octaviano Juarez-Corro (December 22, 1973 – January 22, 2023) was a Mexican-American fugitive who was added to the FBI Ten Most Wanted Fugitives list on September 8, 2021. He was wanted for the murders of Raymundo Munoz-Silva and Julio Diaz-Guillen, who were shot and killed execution-style at South Shore Park in Milwaukee, Wisconsin, on May 29, 2006. Three other people were injured during the shooting. Juarez-Corro was the 525th fugitive to be placed on the FBI's Ten Most Wanted Fugitives list. He replaced Yaser Abdel Said. The FBI offered a reward of up to $100,000 for information leading to his capture. He was captured in Zapopan, Jalisco, Mexico, on February 3, 2022.

Juarez-Corro committed suicide in custody in 2023.

== Murders ==
On May 29, 2006, Memorial Day in the United States, Juarez-Corro's estranged wife and daughter arrived at a picnic at the South Shore Park in Milwaukee. Juarez-Corro, who was not invited, requested that he see his daughter, but his wife told him he was not allowed to see her. He became agitated and pulled out a handgun. He allegedly lined up four people and shot them all execution-style. He killed his wife's boyfriend, along with a bystander who was also attending the picnic.

== Capture ==
Juarez-Corro was arrested on February 3, 2022, in Zapopan, Jalisco, Mexico. He'd spent nearly 16 years on the run.

== Death ==
Juarez-Corro was found unresponsive in his cell at the Milwaukee County Jail on January 22, 2023, and was pronounced dead at 6:45 a.m. CST. He was 49. A ligature mark was found around his neck and investigators later concluded that Juarez-Corro had committed suicide. In April 2023, jailer Laquisha Cowser was charged with misconduct for failing to check on him before his death. In January 2024, Cowser, who resigned during the investigation, pleaded guilty to three misdemeanor charges and was sentenced to 18 months of probation and ordered to perform 50 hours of community service. A felony charge of misconduct in public office was dropped after she completed her probation.
