= Omar Alexander Cardenas =

American fugitive (born 1995)

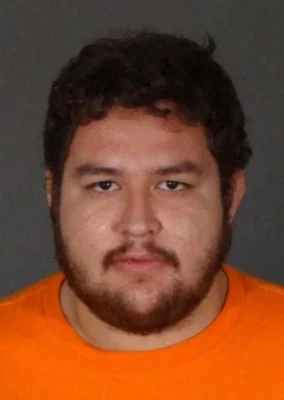
- FBI photograph of Cardenas

FBI Ten Most Wanted Fugitive
- Charges: Murder; Unlawful flight to avoid prosecution
- Reward: $1,000,000
- Alias: "Dollar"

Description
- Born: March 23, 1995 (age 31); Los Angeles County, California, U.S.
- Nationality: American
- Race: Hispanic
- Gender: Male
- Height: 5 ft 6 in (168 cm) – 7 in
- Weight: 240 lb (109 kg) – 300 lb

Status
- Added: July 20, 2022
- Number: 528
- Currently a Top Ten Fugitive

Omar Alexander Cardenas (born March 23, 1995) is an American fugitive and suspected member of the Pierce Street Gang in Los Angeles who was added to the FBI Ten Most Wanted Fugitives list on July 20, 2022. He is wanted for the murder of 46-year-old Jabali Dumas and for unlawful flight to avoid prosecution, and is suspected by authorities to have fled to Mexico in order to avoid arrest. Cardenas was the 528th fugitive to be placed on the FBI's Ten Most Wanted Fugitives list. He replaced Eugene Palmer, who was removed from the list without being captured. The FBI is offering a reward of up to $1,000,000 for information leading to his capture.

== Murder ==
On August 15, 2019, Cardenas is suspected of shooting and killing Jabali Dumas, a 46-year-old man, outside of the Hair Icon Barber Shop in the Sylmar neighborhood of Los Angeles, California. LAPD chief Michel Moore stated that Cardenas fired nine shots at Dumas from approximately 30 feet away, striking him in the head. The victim died at the scene, and Cardenas was seen fleeing in his vehicle. It is unclear if the suspect and victim knew each other prior to the shooting. Cardenas was charged with the murder in April of 2020.

== Fugitive ==
Cardenas was charged with unlawful flight to avoid prosecution in September of 2021. The FBI has stated that Cardenas may have fled to Mexico or may also be in Southern California, where he has family and friends. The FBI has also stated that he may be working as a construction worker.

== See also ==
- List of fugitives from justice who disappeared
