= Francisco Javier Roman-Bardales =

Salvadoran narcoterrorist (born 1977)

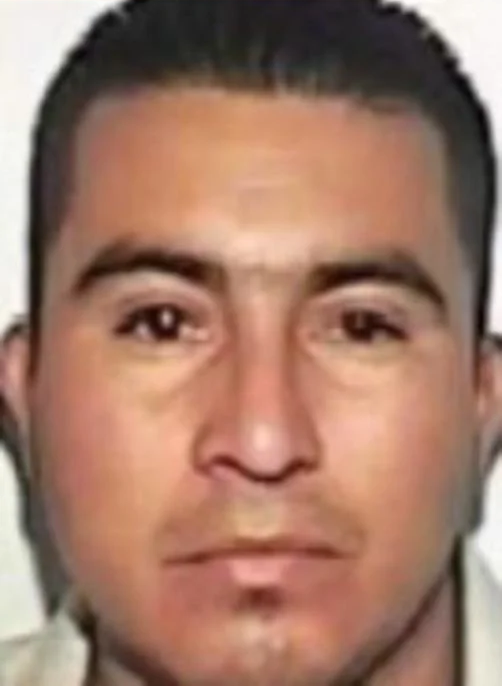

FBI Ten Most Wanted Fugitive
- Charges: Conspiracy to Provide and Conceal Material Support and Resources to Terrorists; Narco-Terrorism Conspiracy; Racketeering Conspiracy (RICO); Alien Smuggling Conspiracy
- Reward: $250,000
- Alias: "Veterano de Tribus"

Description
- Born: December 2, 1977 (age 48); Ahuachapán, El Salvador
- Nationality: Salvadoran
- Gender: Male
- Height: 5 ft 5 in (165 cm)
- Weight: 175 lb (79 kg)

Status
- Added: February 21, 2025
- Caught: March 17, 2025
- Number: 534
- Captured

Francisco Javier Roman-Bardales (born December 2, 1977), also known as "Veterano de Tribus", is a Salvadoran former fugitive and an alleged senior leader of MS-13 responsible for criminal activities of the gang in the United States, Mexico, and El Salvador.

== Criminal history ==
In December 2020, Roman-Bardales was indicted along with 26 other high-ranking MS-13 leaders by the Eastern District of New York. He faces serious charges, including conspiracy to provide and conceal material support to terrorists, narcoterrorism conspiracy, racketeering conspiracy, and alien smuggling conspiracy.

As part of MS-13's leadership, he is alleged to have been involved in directing acts of violence and murder, establishing military-style training camps, and obtaining military-grade weapons. The organization is also accused of manipulating the electoral process in El Salvador and negotiating with the Salvadoran government for benefits and concessions.

He is also believed to have played a role in MS-13's expansion into Mexico, forging alliances with Mexican drug cartels and engaging in various criminal activities, including narcotics trafficking, human smuggling, extortion, and arms trafficking.

In September 2022, a federal arrest warrant was issued for Roman-Bardales in the United States on narcoterrorism and human smuggling charges. On February 21, 2025, he was placed on the FBI's Ten Most Wanted Fugitives list, replacing Arnoldo Jimenez.

On March 17, 2025, Roman-Bardales was apprehended in Teocelo, Veracruz, Mexico. The arrest was the result of a coordinated effort by both U.S. and Mexican authorities, who had been surveilling Roman-Bardales in the days leading up to his arrest. He was transported to Mexico City before being handed over to U.S. authorities and brought to the United States to face charges. He was arraigned in New York City on March 19, 2025.

== See also ==
- FBI Ten Most Wanted Fugitives, 2020s
