= Eugene Palmer (fugitive) =

American fugitive (born 1939)

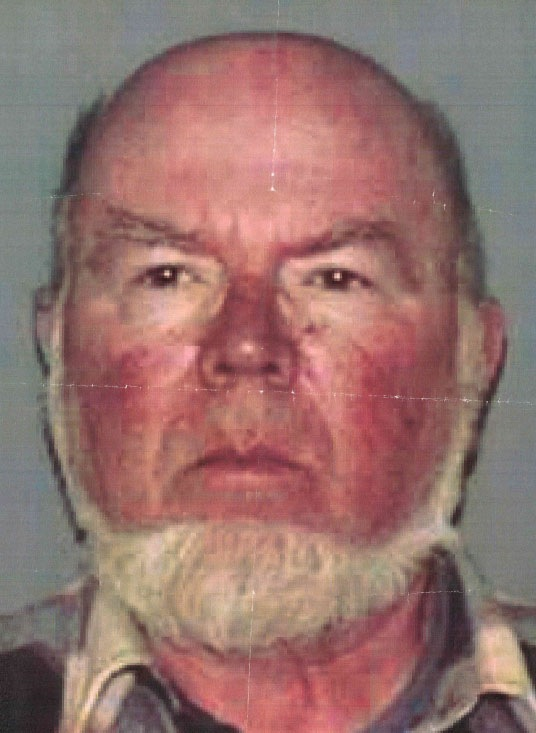
- Photograph taken in 2012 (age 73)

FBI Ten Most Wanted Fugitive
- Charges: Murder; Unlawful Flight to Avoid Prosecution
- Alias: Eugene K. Palmer; Eugene Kenneth Palmer; Eugene Kevin Palmer

Description
- Born: April 4, 1939 (age 87); New York, United States
- Gender: Male
- Height: 5 ft 10 in (178 cm)
- Weight: 220 lb (100 kg)
- Children: John Palmer, Clarence Palmer, James Palmer

Status
- Added: May 29, 2019
- Removed: July 20, 2022
- Number: 523
- Removed from Top Ten Fugitive List

Eugene K. Palmer (born April 4, 1939) is an American fugitive wanted for allegedly killing his daughter-in-law, Tammy Palmer (née Pannirello), in Stony Point, New York, on September 24, 2012. On May 29, 2019, he was named by the FBI as the 523rd fugitive to be placed on its Ten Most Wanted list. On July 20, 2022, he was removed from the FBI's Most Wanted Fugitives List. Despite his removal from the Top Ten List, he remains a highly wanted fugitive, and has an international Interpol warrant issued against him.

== Background ==
Eugene Palmer's son, John Palmer, was married to Tammy Palmer (née Pannirello), and the couple lived together with their two children at a property owned by Eugene in Stony Point, New York. Eugene lived next door to the couple. The relationship between John and Tammy began to deteriorate, and they eventually started seeing other people. Tammy filed for a restraining order against John, which enraged Eugene. Tammy also threatened to file for divorce and sue for the land belonging to Eugene. Authorities say this started a feud between Eugene and Tammy that would culminate in a heated confrontation several days before the murder of Tammy.

== Murder ==
On the morning of Monday, September 24, 2012, Tammy walked her two children to the school bus. It is believed that Eugene hid in the woods, lying in wait to ambush her on her return home. When Tammy walked back toward her home, Eugene allegedly began firing his shotgun at her from a distance. The first shot struck her in the arm, the second missed; but the third shot, delivered at close range, hit her in the chest and was fatal. After the shooting, Eugene fled the scene in a green Dodge Ram pickup; the truck would later be found abandoned outside Harriman State Park in Rockland County. Eugene ditched the truck and fled into the park on foot. When police called in search dogs, they followed Eugene's scent to a campground in the woods. Despite multiple searches, no further trace of Eugene has been found since.

In September 2014, a New York Supreme Court judge awarded Tammy's children $2.15 million (equivalent to $2.92 million in 2025) — the estimated value of Eugene Palmer's entire estate — after determining by a preponderance of the evidence that Eugene killed their mother.

== Investigation ==
A federal arrest warrant was issued for Eugene Palmer on June 10, 2013. Family members of his have expressed their belief that he died in the park; however, according to Haverstraw police, no body was ever discovered after multiple searches of the area. Eugene depends on medications for a heart condition and diabetes. He is an outdoorsman—an experienced hunter, angler, and hiker—and is also described as a car enthusiast. He has a deformed left thumb. Authorities believe he may be hiding in Florida or Upstate New York, where he has relatives.

On May 29, 2019, Eugene Palmer was added to the FBI Ten Most Wanted Fugitives list.

On August 17, 2021, acting on a tip, the FBI searched the home of one of Eugene's granddaughters in Warwick, New York, but ultimately found nothing.

On July 20, 2022, Eugene Palmer was removed from the FBI Ten Most Wanted Fugitives list after it was determined that he no longer fit the list criteria. He was replaced by Omar Alexander Cardenas. Despite his removal, he remains a wanted fugitive.

== In popular culture ==
On March 25, 2020, Eugene Palmer was the focus of an episode of In Pursuit with John Walsh. On March 15, 2021, he was featured on the first episode of the revival of America's Most Wanted. On August 25, 2021, he was the subject of an episode of the Unsolved Mysteries podcast.

== See also ==
- List of fugitives from justice who disappeared
