= Wilver Villegas-Palomino =

Colombian insurgency leader (born 1981)

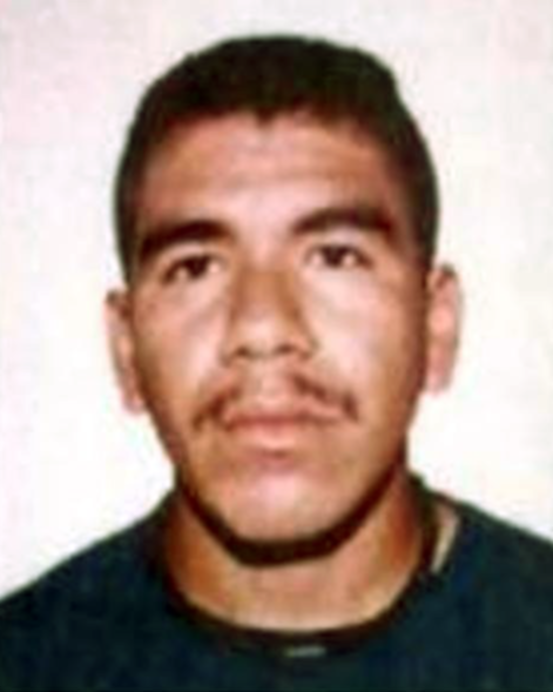
- FBI Top 10 Wanted Poster Photograph

FBI Ten Most Wanted Fugitive
- Charges: Narcoterrorism; International cocaine distribution; Conspiracy
- Reward: $5,000,000
- Alias: Carlos El Puerco

Description
- Born: October 21, 1981 (age 44); Curumaní, Colombia
- Nationality: Colombian
- Gender: Male

Status
- Added: April 14, 2023
- Number: 530
- Currently a Top Ten Fugitive

Wilver Villegas-Palomino (born October 21, 1981) is a Colombian fugitive who is a high-ranking member of the National Liberation Army and one of the people listed on the FBI's Ten Most Wanted Fugitives.

== Criminal career ==
Palomino is considered a leader of the National Liberation Army in Colombia, he was previously known to facilitate the traffic of cocaine into the United States, which the United States deems as narcoterrorism financing, since proceeds were used to fund the ELN through the distribution of illegal narcotics in the Greater Houston area.

Palomino is also implicated of currently being involved in the Catatumbo conflict, managing an estimated seventy Cocaine labs on behalf of the ELN, both in Northeastern Colombia and Northwest Venezuela.

On February 12, 2020, Palomino was indicted on charges of narcoterrorism, conspiracy to import cocaine and international distribution of cocaine by the Southern District of Texas. On September 21, 2020, the United States offered US$5 million for any information leading to his arrest.

On April 14, 2023, Palomino was added to the FBI's Ten Most Wanted Fugitives list, replacing Rafael Caro Quintero.
