= Central American Civil Wars =

The Central American Civil War may refer to one of the following conflicts:

- First Central American Civil War (1826–1829)
- Second Central American Civil War (1838–1841)

== Other civil wars ==
- Ochomogo War (1823)
- League War (1835)
- Olancho War (1864)
- Guerra de los Padres (1860–1861)
- First Honduran Civil War (1919)
- Second Honduran Civil War (1924)
- Nicaraguan Civil War (1926–27)
- La Matanza (1932)
- Costa Rican Civil War (1948)
- Guatemalan Civil War (1960–1996)
- Nicaraguan Revolution (1978–1990)
- Salvadoran Civil War (1979–1992)
