= Narcotics Rewards Program =

US program targeting international drug traffickers

The Narcotics Rewards Program is a program of the United States Department of State that offers rewards for information leading to the arrest and/or conviction of major international narcotics traffickers who send drugs into the United States. It was established by Congress in 1986, and as of 2021 it has paid out over $130 million in rewards leading to apprehensions.

The Department of State’s Bureau for International Narcotics and Law Enforcement Affairs (INL) manages the program in close coordination with the Department of Justice, Department of Homeland Security, Immigration and Customs Enforcement (ICE), the Drug Enforcement Administration (DEA), Federal Bureau of Investigation (FBI), and other interested U.S. agencies.

Proposals to pay rewards are submitted to the Department of State by the chief of mission at a U.S. embassy at the behest of a U.S. law enforcement agency. Reward proposals are carefully reviewed by an interagency committee, which makes a recommendation for a reward payment to the Secretary of State. Only the Secretary of State has the authority to determine if a reward should be paid, and, in cases where there is Federal criminal jurisdiction, the Secretary must obtain the concurrence of the Attorney General. It normally takes more than a year for the Department of State to pay a reward. although there are cases reported as Diego Leon Montoya Sanchez's capture taking more than eight years without payout for the reward offered for his capture, the reward posters offer a reward " up to" $5 million, people interested in a reward should know that the quoted phrase has been construed to include zero as its lower limit. See application of Michel, 470 F2d 638' 640 (C.C.P.A 1972); Arness v. Franks, 138 F2d 213, 216 (C.C.P.A 1943); see also Public service comm'n of Md. v. City of Annapolis, 526 A.2d 975, 981 (Md Ct Spec App 1987) ( " the statement of a maximum does not imply the existence of a minimum") also who any federal agent is authorized to promise that the reward will be pay, only the attorney general can guarantee the pay.

Overseas, individuals wishing to provide information on major narcotics traffickers may contact the nearest U.S. embassy or consulate. In the U.S., individuals should contact the DEA, FBI, or ICE directly. The U.S. government will ensure confidentiality to individuals who provide information on major narcotics traffickers, and, if appropriate, will relocate these individuals and their families.

In February 2014, The Guardian reported that some informants were not paid the rewards offered.

== See also ==
- Rewards For Justice Program
