= FBI Ten Most Wanted Fugitives =

US federal law enforcement most wanted list

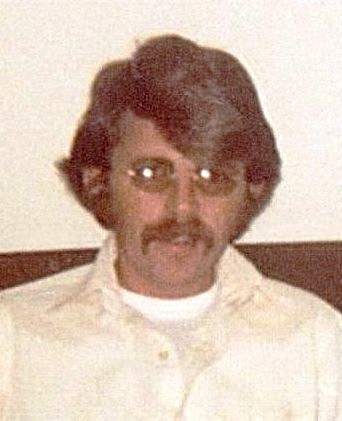
On May 19, 1996, Leslie Isben Rogge (pictured here in 1973) became the first person on the FBI Ten Most Wanted Fugitives list to be apprehended due to the FBI's then-new home page on the internet.

The FBI Ten Most Wanted Fugitives is a most wanted list maintained by the United States' Federal Bureau of Investigation (FBI). The list arose from a conversation held in late 1949 between J. Edgar Hoover, Director of the FBI, and William Kinsey Hutchinson, International News Service (the predecessor of the United Press International) editor-in-chief, who were discussing ways to promote capture of the FBI's "toughest guys". This discussion turned into a published article, which received so much positive publicity that on March 14, 1950, the FBI officially announced the list to increase law enforcement's ability to capture dangerous fugitives. The first person added to the list was Thomas J. Holden, a robber and member of the Holden–Keating Gang on the day of the list's inception.

Individuals are generally only removed from the list if they are captured, dead, or if the charges against them are dropped; they are then replaced by a new entry selected by the FBI. In eleven cases, the FBI removed individuals from the list after deciding that they were no longer a "particularly dangerous menace to society". Machetero member Víctor Manuel Gerena, added to the list in 1984, was on the list for 32 years, which was longer than anyone else. Samuel Ramirez Jr. spent the shortest amount of time on the list, being listed for one hour and thirteen minutes in 2026. The oldest person to be added to the list was Eugene Palmer on May 29, 2019, at 80 years old. On rare occasions, the FBI will add a "Number Eleven" if that individual is extremely dangerous but the Bureau does not feel any of the current ten should be removed. Despite occasional references in the media, the FBI does not rank their list; no suspect is considered "#1 on the FBI's Most Wanted List" or "The Most Wanted".

The list is commonly posted in public places such as post offices. Some people on the list have turned themselves in. (Note: Examples being Heather Tallchief in 2005 and Robert Van Wisse in 2017.) On May 18, 1996, after surrendering at the U.S. embassy in Guatemala City, Leslie Isben Rogge became the first person on the FBI Ten Most Wanted Fugitives list to be apprehended due to the FBI's then-new home page on the internet. The FBI maintains other lists of individuals, including the FBI Most Wanted Terrorists, along with crime alerts, missing persons, and other fugitive lists.

On June 17, 2013, the list reached a cumulative total of 500 fugitives having been listed. As of November 20, 2026, 544 fugitives had been listed, thirteen of them women (2%), and 505 of them were captured or located (93%), 164 (31%) of them due to public assistance.

== New additions ==
The Criminal Investigative Division (CID) at FBI Headquarters calls upon all 56 Field Offices to submit candidates for the FBI's "Ten Most Wanted Fugitives" list. The nominees received are reviewed by special agents in the CID and the Office of Public Affairs. The selection of the proposed candidates is forwarded to the assistant director of the CID for their approval and then to the FBI's Director for final approval. This process takes some time, which is why James Joseph "Whitey" Bulger Jr., who was arrested in Santa Monica, California, on June 22, 2011, remained on the list until May 9, 2012, despite no longer being at large. Osama bin Laden similarly remained on the list for almost a year after his death at the hands of U.S. forces on May 2, 2011.

On occasion, fugitives have been added to the list at the request of local law enforcement. For example, Bureau director Clarence M. Kelley added Twymon Myers to the list in 1973 at the request of New York City police commissioner Donald Cawley.

== List as of November 2026 ==
Rewards are offered for information leading to capture of fugitives on the list; the reward is a minimum of $1,000,000 (until March 2026: $250,000; May 2023: $100,000) for all fugitives.

Photo	Name	Date added	Sequence number	Comments
enter	Bhadreshkumar Chetanbhai Patel	April 18, 2017	514	Patel, an Indian national, allegedly stabbed and killed his wife at a Dunkin' Donuts location in Hanover, Maryland, on April 12, 2015. He was last seen taking a shuttle to Newark Penn Station. According to authorities, he has connections to Canada, India, and the U.S. states of Georgia, Illinois, Kentucky, and New Jersey.
	Yulan Adonay Archaga Carias	November 3, 2021	526	Archaga Carias is charged federally in the Southern District of New York with racketeering conspiracy, cocaine importation conspiracy, and possession and conspiracy to possess machine guns. As the alleged leader of MS-13 for all of Honduras, Archaga Carias allegedly controlled MS-13 criminal activity in Honduras and provided support and resources to the MS-13 enterprise in Central America and the United States with firearms, narcotics, and cash. Archaga Carias is also allegedly responsible for supporting multi-ton loads of cocaine through Honduras to the United States and for ordering and participating in murders of rival gang members and others associated with MS-13. The reward for information leading to his capture was increased to $5 million on February 8, 2023.
	Ruja Ignatova	June 30, 2022	527	Ignatova is wanted for her alleged leadership of a massive fraud scheme called OneCoin. She was last seen in October 2017 in Athens, Greece, and has ties to her birthplace of Bulgaria and Germany. The reward for information leading to her capture was increased to $5 million on June 26, 2024.
	Omar Alexander Cardenas	July 20, 2022	528	Cardenas is wanted for his alleged involvement in the murder of a man outside a barbershop in Los Angeles, California, in the summer of 2019.
	Wilver Villegas-Palomino	April 14, 2023	530	Wilver Villegas-Palomino is a member of the National Liberation Army (Ejército de Liberación Nacional (ELN)), a transnational criminal organization and foreign terrorist organization. He is charged with narcoterrorism, international cocaine distribution conspiracy, and international cocaine distribution. United States Department of State Narcotics Rewards Program is offering up to $5 million for information leading to his arrest and/or his conviction.
	Fausto Isidro Meza Flores (captured)	February 4, 2025	533	Fausto Isidro Meza Flores, the alleged leader of the Meza-Flores Transnational Criminal Organization, is wanted for a series of drug-related crimes. He allegedly conspired to manufacture and distribute cocaine, heroin, methamphetamine, and marijuana in the United States from 2005 to 2019. He was captured in a Mexican operation on November 20, 2026.
	Giovanni Vicente Mosquera Serrano	June 24, 2025	536	Giovanni Vicente Mosquera Serrano is believed to be a senior leader for Tren de Aragua, a transnational criminal organization from Venezuela. He is charged with international cocaine distribution, providing material support for terrorists and conspiracy.
	Trung Duc Lu	March 11, 2026	539	Trung Duc Lu is wanted in connection with the August 2014 kidnapping, torture, and murder of two Vietnamese brothers who had been engaged in drug dealing in Philadelphia, Pennsylvania. A third male was also kidnapped and tortured, but managed to survive the attack. He is currently believed to be in Vietnam.
	Satinderjeet Singh	September 28, 2026	543	Satinderjeet Singh is wanted for his alleged involvement in the Bishnoi Gang organized crime group which is allegedly engaged in a variety of violent acts in Southern California, and across the United States and Canada. These acts include assassinations of political and religious figures, shootings, murders, kidnappings, extortions, assaults, and the trafficking of narcotics and weapons. Singh is based in the United States and is the alleged leader of the group in North America.
	Joseph Matos	October 20, 2026	544	Joseph Matos is wanted for his alleged involvement in the murder of a National Guard member in the Belmont Cragin neighborhood of Chicago, Illinois, on July 3, 2021. Matos is believed to be a member of the Milwaukee Kings street gang, a criminal organization whose members and associates have engaged in narcotics trafficking and committed acts of violence, including murder and assault, to acquire and preserve the gang's perceived territory on the north side of Chicago.

== See also ==
- 2009 Mexico most-wanted drug lords
- Operation Flagship – 1985 American police sting operation
- Specially Designated Global Terrorist – United States terrorist designation
