= Marine policy of the Obama administration =

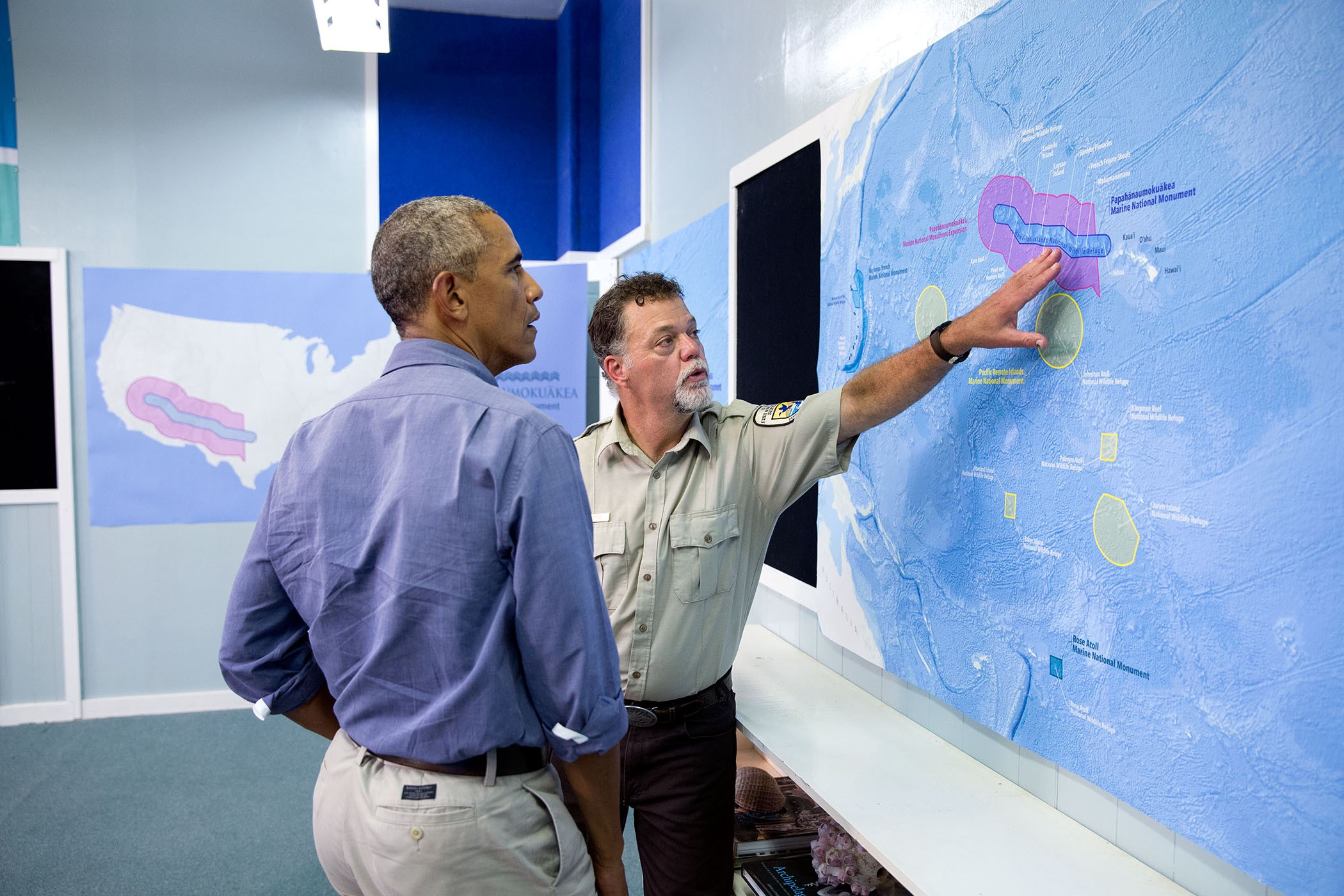
Obama being shown map of the U.S. Pacific marine national monuments at Midway Atoll National Wildlife Refuge, Aug. 31, 2016

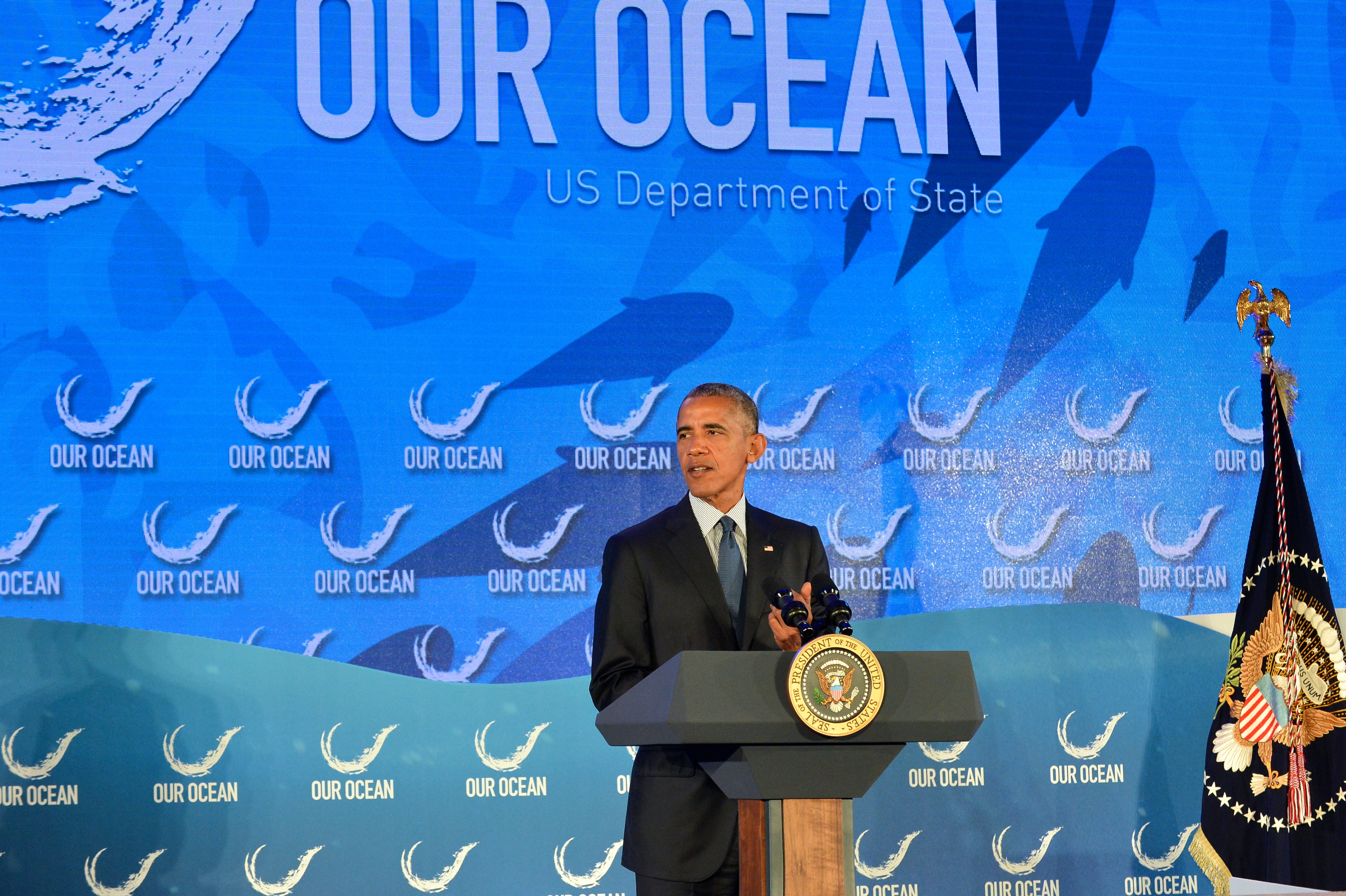
Obama delivering remarks at the 2016 Our Ocean conference concerning climate change and conservation efforts.

The marine policy of the Barack Obama administration comprises several significant environmental policy decisions for the oceans made during his two terms in office from 2009 to 2017. By executive action, US President Barack Obama increased fourfold the amount of protected marine space in waters under United States control, setting a major precedent for global ocean conservation. Using the U.S. president's authority under the Antiquities Act of 1906, he expanded to 200 nautical miles the seaward limits of Papahānaumokuākea Marine National Monument in Hawaiʻi and the Pacific Remote Islands Marine National Monument around the U.S. island possessions in the Central Pacific. In the Atlantic, Obama created the Northeast Canyons and Seamounts Marine National Monument, the first marine monument in the U.S. exclusive economic zone (EEZ) in the Atlantic.

In the second year of his presidency, on July 19, 2010, Obama signed an executive order entitled "Stewardship of the Ocean, Our Coasts, and the Great Lakes." This order created a policy framework for integrated marine spatial planning at the sub-national (regional) level. It also created a council of cabinet-level officials to coordinate policy under the nation's domestic and international rules for the oceans. This executive order reflected many of the recommendations of the U.S. Commission on Ocean Policy in its 2004 report to Congress. In 2014, the Obama administration inaugurated the "Our Ocean" series of annual conferences to build and promote international cooperation to protect the world's oceans. Members of the Obama administration testified on behalf of U.S. accession to the U.N. Convention on the Law of the Sea, to strengthen international norms respecting the freedom of navigation and for the sustainable development and use of marine resources. At the end of his second term in office, President Obama approved rules recommended by the National Ocean Council to combat illegal fishing on the high seas and seafood mislabeling through import traceability and catch certification requirements.

For fish stocks within the U.S. EEZ, administrators at NOAA Fisheries (also known as the National Marine Fisheries Service) oversaw implementation of the Magnuson-Stevens Fishery Conservation and Management Act amendments of 2007 that required overfished or depleted stocks to be rebuilt to population levels that could provide a sustainable yield. By 2013, a number of important fish stocks within the eight fishery management regions had been rebuilt. Several regional fishery management councils began developing ecosystem-based plans in response to renewed emphasis on the ecosystem approach to fisheries. The Obama administration advanced a precautionary approach to marine resource development in the Arctic Ocean by leading the successful negotiation of an agreement upon a 16-year moratorium on industrial fishing in the Central Arctic Ocean as it becomes ice-free due to global warming. U.S. ocean diplomats also participated in preparatory conferences on a new United Nations agreement for the conservation of and sharing of benefits from marine biodiversity in marine areas beyond national jurisdiction. At the International Maritime Organization, the U.S. delegation successfully negotiated a new set of international rules governing shipping in polar regions.

== Expansion of Marine National Monuments and National Marine Sanctuaries ==
One of the main goals of the four-fold expansion of the Papahānaumokuākea Marine National Monument was to promote the conservation of marine biodiversity in the U.S. EEZ. Scientific studies have shown that underwater mountains, or seamounts, are rich in biodiversity as they provide a structure for animals to live on. Free-floating larvae lost on ocean currents are able to settle on seamounts from many distant areas. Seamounts cause comparatively strong currents that bring in phytoplankton and other nutrients and attract pelagic species. Sedentary animals like sponges, corals, and gorgonians propagate on the available space the seamount provides; they also benefit from incoming nutrients from the currents. These sedentary animals provide a structure and the basis of a thriving ecosystem. The original boundaries of Papahānaumokuākea Marine National Monument, set in 2006 at 50 nautical miles around the coral atolls and reefs, did not include many seamounts, which the revised boundaries now do. The goal of the expansion was to protect these biodiversity hot spots from potential adverse effects of fishing, allowing them to function as fish refugia, places where fish populations can grow and maintain a natural age structure, especially the pelagic tuna and sharks. President Obama's proclamation effectuating this geographic expansion in 2016 also expanded the management philosophy of the Monument. The proclamation added the Office of Hawaiian Affairs as a full partner in the cooperative management agreement in recognition of the significance of the islands and coral reefs to living Native Hawaiian culture. This expanded the basis for protection to include indigenous principles and cultural knowledge. Archaeological sites and ancestral environments are located on the islands of Nīhoa and Mokumanamana. Papahānaumokuākea was inscribed on the UNESCO World Heritage List as a mixed natural and cultural site in July 2010. This inscription adds a layer of international protection to the Monument.

Another monument President Obama expanded for biodiversity preservation is the Pacific Remote Islands Marine National Monument, surrounding Wake, Baker, Howland, and Jarvis Islands, Johnston and Palmyra Atolls, and Kingman Reef. These marine areas are part of the EEZ that was codified by the Magnuson–Stevens Fishery Conservation and Management Act. The Obama administration in 2012 expanded administratively the boundaries of the Fagatele Bay National Marine Sanctuary from less than one square mile to 13,581 square miles. It also reestablished the sanctuary nomination process under the National Marine Sanctuaries Act. Regulations calling for public nominations were published in the Federal Register in June, 2014. NOAA, however, rejected a nomination to establish the Aleutian Islands National Marine Sanctuary based on a lack of support from the communities that would be most affected by the designation.

=== Trump administration actions to rollback new and expanded marine reserves ===
On 26 April 2017 President Trump signed Executive Order 13792, which directed the Secretary of the Interior to review certain National Monuments designated or expanded under the Antiquities Act. Section 2 of the Executive Order specifies that not all National Monuments are under review, only those that "were created after 1 January 1996, where the designation covers more than 100,000 acres, where the designation after expansion covers more than 100,000 acres, or where the Secretary determines that the designation or expansion was made without adequate public outreach and coordination with relevant stakeholders, to determine whether each designation or expansion conforms to the policy set forth in section 1 of the order." The Marine National Monuments being considered under this Executive Order include but are not limited to: the Marianas Trench Marine National Monument, the Northeast Canyons and Seamounts Marine National Monument, the Pacific Remote Islands Marine National Monument, and the Rose Atoll Marine National Monument. Unlike Marine Sanctuary designation, Marine National Monument designation does not require a public comment period because National Monuments are established by means of the Antiquities Act and Marine Sanctuaries are created by an act of NOAA and Congress. Through this review process Trump and Secretary of the Interior Ryan Zinke hoped to "gain local input [which] is a critical component of federal land management." As of 19 December 2019 Zinke is no longer the Secretary of the Interior and the only National Monuments that have shrunk in size were terrestrial ones located in Utah, namely Bears Ears and Grand Staircase–Escalante. In his report, Zinke advised Trump to allow commercial fishing within the Rose Atoll, Pacific Remote Islands, and Northeast Canyons and Seamounts Marine National Monuments.

On June 6, 2020, former President Trump issued a proclamation reopening the Northeast Canyons and Seamounts to commercial fishing, arguing that the fish species protected by the monument (tuna, sharks, etc.) are not unique and are well-managed for sustainability under the Magnuson-Stevens Act. He further stated that as the Magnuson-Stevens act regulates commercial fishing, to "ensure long-term biological and economic sustainability for our Nation's marine fisheries", the prohibition on commercial fishing was not necessary to protecting the integrity of the monument. On the previous day, at a roundtable discussion of commercial fishing issues in Bangor, Maine, the president stated that the Obama proclamation creating the Monument, which had made a seven-year exception to the no-fishing rule for the offshore lobster and red crab industries, "was deeply unfair to Maine lobstermen," according to the Associated Press. According to the White House transcript of the roundtable, however, Maine lobstermen, who do not fish in waters as far south as the Monument, commented that the tariffs imposed by China on their lobster shipments, in retaliation for the U.S. tariffs on Chinese imports, had reduced their exports to zero. President Trump directed his trade advisor to look into the complaint. In further comment on his actions, which have been challenged in court by the Conservation Law Foundation. According to the trade magazine serving the fishing industry, a press release from the National Fisheries Institute applauded the Trump administration for withdrawing arbitrary fisheries restrictions on the Northeast Canyons and Seamounts National Monument off the coast of New England". "We welcome efforts to refocus on fisheries regulation that are transparent, participatory and science-based, and in this case best achieved through the New England Fishery Management Council." [98]

=== Biden administration actions on U.S. marine reserves ===
On his first day in office, President Joe Biden, signed a number of executive orders and actions to restart U.S. efforts to address climate change. These actions included an order directing a whole-of-government approach to tackling the climate crisis by transitioning to a low-carbon economy, rejoining the Paris Agreement, and committing the Nation to a goal of conserving at least 30% of its lands and waters by 2030. The new president also ordered executive branch agencies to freeze approval reviews of oil and gas leasing on federal lands and restore environmental rules critical to combatting climate change, including increasing vehicle fuel efficiency standards and cutting greenhouse gas emissions from electricity-generating power plants. He directed the Secretary of Interior to review and revise if appropriate the previous administration's alterations of national monuments, including the marine national monuments created or expanded by President Obama in the Northwest Atlantic and the Pacific.

== Science-based marine conservation policies ==
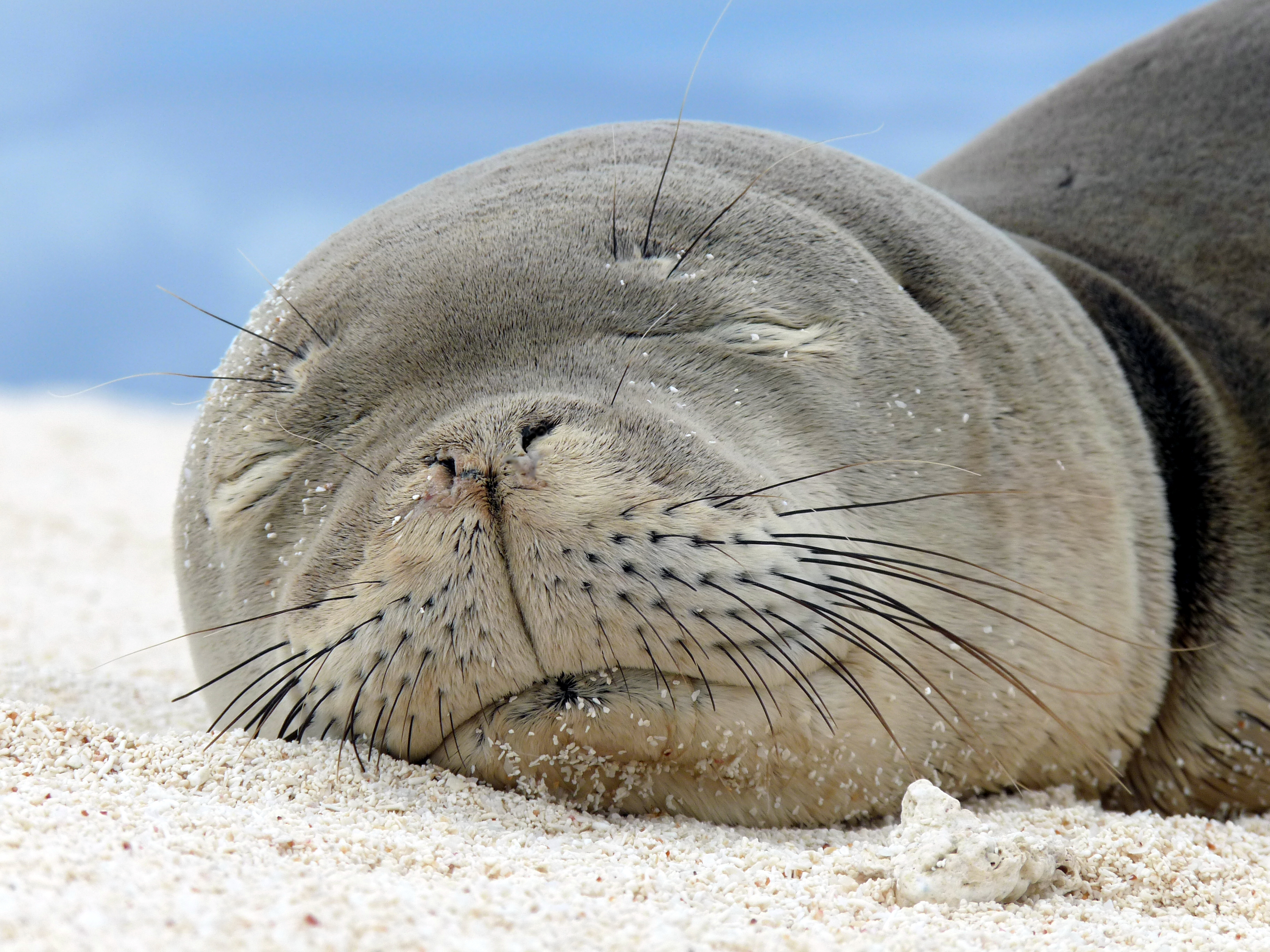
Hawaiian monk seal at French Frigate Shoals hauled-out for rest

Beyond the expansion of the Papahānaumokuākea Marine National Monument, there were numerous agency policy decisions and actions which afforded protections for marine life. Each of these was explicitly based upon the "best available scientific data and information" as the marine conservation laws of the U.S. require. These policy decisions were taken under the authority delegated by Congress to the Executive Branch by the Marine Mammal Protection Act of 1972, as amended, and the Endangered Species Act of 1973, as amended. The Marine Mammal Protection Act empowers the Marine Mammal Commission to review and comment upon policies adopted under that act to ensure their scientific integrity. The Hawaiian monk seal (HMS) is an endangered species which resides in both the Main Hawaiian Islands and the Northwestern Hawaiian Islands (NWHI). This species is not only an endangered species, but also enjoys the protections provided by the Marine Mammal Protection Act. Effective September 21, 2015, the National Marine Fisheries Service (NMFS), a division of NOAA, issued a final rule to revise the critical habitat designation for the HMS. The changes made clarified the location and refined the boundaries of pupping, nursing, and haul-out areas. Essential foraging areas were updated to be "marine areas 0-200 meters in depth that support adequate prey availability and quantity for juvenile and adult monk seal foraging." In the NWHI, all terrestrial areas, except for Midway harbor and non-accessible and unused areas, are considered "critical habitat".

Other significant domestic marine policy actions carried over from previous administrations. Notable examples include the decision on reinstating Indian whaling by the Makah Tribe of western Washington state, broadly applying a strict U.S. definition of "dolphin-safe" label for canned tuna imports, denial of a permit to import beluga whales from Russia for public display and captive breeding by several prominent sea life parks and aquarium, rejecting a petition to list the Reef Manta Ray as a threatened distinct population segment, and adoption of regulations governing the import of fish and fish products from countries that do not effectively control by-catch of marine mammals in commercial fisheries that export their catches to the U.S., especially small, endemic populations such as the Vaquita porpoise in the Gulf of California and the Hector's dolphin in New Zealand.

The Obama administration also dealt with recurrent, politically sensitive decisions including approving incidental "take" permits for noise harassment by military training and readiness exercises using active sonar, and by-catch reduction regulations for US commercial fisheries that interact with endangered sea turtles, seabirds or cetaceans or that occur within designated critical habitat of whales such as the North Atlantic right whale. After designating critical habitat for threatened polar bear populations listed by the Bush administration, the Obama administration considered listing petitions for additional marine life species threatened by climate change, including ice-dependent seals in the U.S. Arctic, and reef-building corals. During the Obama years, the National Oceanic and Atmospheric Administration (NOAA) Deep Sea Coral Research and Technology Program made significant investments in research on deep-water corals. Connecting with this research, the U.S. delegation at the U.N. General Assembly supported resolutions calling for the protection of vulnerable marine ecosystems (VMEs) from the adverse effects of high seas fisheries. NOAA also proposed regulations under the Marine Mammal Protection Act to protect Hawaiian spinner dolphins from harassment or other disturbance from dolphin-directed tourism and recreational use while they are resting in bays on the main Hawaiian Islands. The proposed rules prohibit any person, vessel, or aircraft from approaching closer than 50-yards spinner dolphins in the coastal waters of Hawaii either directly or through interception. The rule is intended to protect dolphins from disturbance by vessel noise and human interactions from commercial, swim-with-dolphins tours, spiritual retreats, and recreational users. Before proposing the rules, NOAA funded an extensive, interdisciplinary research program that resulted in many peer-reviewed publications.

Implementation of the 2007 amendments to the Magnuson-Stevens Fishery Conservation and Management Act required NOAA Fisheries to focus on improving the scientific basis for managing fisheries in U.S. waters. The amendments required the regional fishery management councils to rebuild fish stocks identified as overfished within ten years of their identification or in as short a time as possible. Science advisors to the regional fishery management councils had to determine with greater precision the population status and trends of exploited fish stocks in order to recommend annual catch limits that were based on fishing mortality rates that would allow fish populations to rebuild. NOAA revised the guidelines for National Standard 1 of the Magnuson-Stevens Act to ensure that the councils adopted the science-based rebuilding plans and a policy on quantifying and controlling the discarding at sea of non-target species, i.e., by-catch. The agency also adopted a national policy on catch shares to encourage the regional management councils and their state agency partners to adopt some form of individual fishing rights in limited access fisheries in order to improve profitability and prevent a race to fish for the annual catch limit. NOAA's report to Congress on the status of U.S. fisheries at the end of 2016 reported that two fish stocks had been rebuilt and overfishing curtailed in a number of others. Despite positive signs of potential stock recovery in 2008 and the allocation of catch entitlements to voluntary fishery sectors in 2010, the historically significant New England cod stock collapsed in 2012 and was declared a fishery disaster in 2014. The owner of the largest fishing company in New England, Carlos Rafael, a member of a New Bedford groundfish sector, was convicted of falsifying catch and dealer reports on cod landings to the federal government. He was sentenced to four years in federal prison and required to sell dozens of fishing vessels and their limited-access permits and sector entitlements.

== Offshore aquaculture policy ==
In an effort to increase the production of seafood in the U.S. and address a serious imbalance of trade in fish products, the Obama administration's NOAA approved a plan for the governance of offshore aquaculture submitted by the Gulf of Mexico Regional Fishery Management Council. This action was called the Gulf Aquaculture Rule and final rules were published in the Federal Register. The rule was challenged in court by a coalition of environmental activists and a charter fishing industry association. In 2018, a federal district court in Louisiana ruled that the Magnuson-Stevens Act as currently written does not authorize NOAA to manage the cultivation of finfish in the U.S. EEZ nor issue permits to finfish farmers to grow a designated amount of fish (in this case, 64 million pounds). On appeal, the Fifth Circuit Court of Appeals upheld the ruling. Members of Congress introduced and considered legislation, the AQUAA Act, that would give NOAA lead agency responsibilities for offshore aquaculture. This bill was not adopted before the end of the 116th Congress, in December 2020. While the bill was under consideration, President Trump issued an executive order in May 2020. The order directed all federal agencies to remove unnecessary regulations and to expedite offshore aquaculture permitting in order to increase the production of U.S. seafood and jobs in the seafood sector.

The Food and Drug Administration approved the application by AquaBounty Technologies to use genetically modified Atlantic salmon in the U.S.

== Offshore oil development policy ==
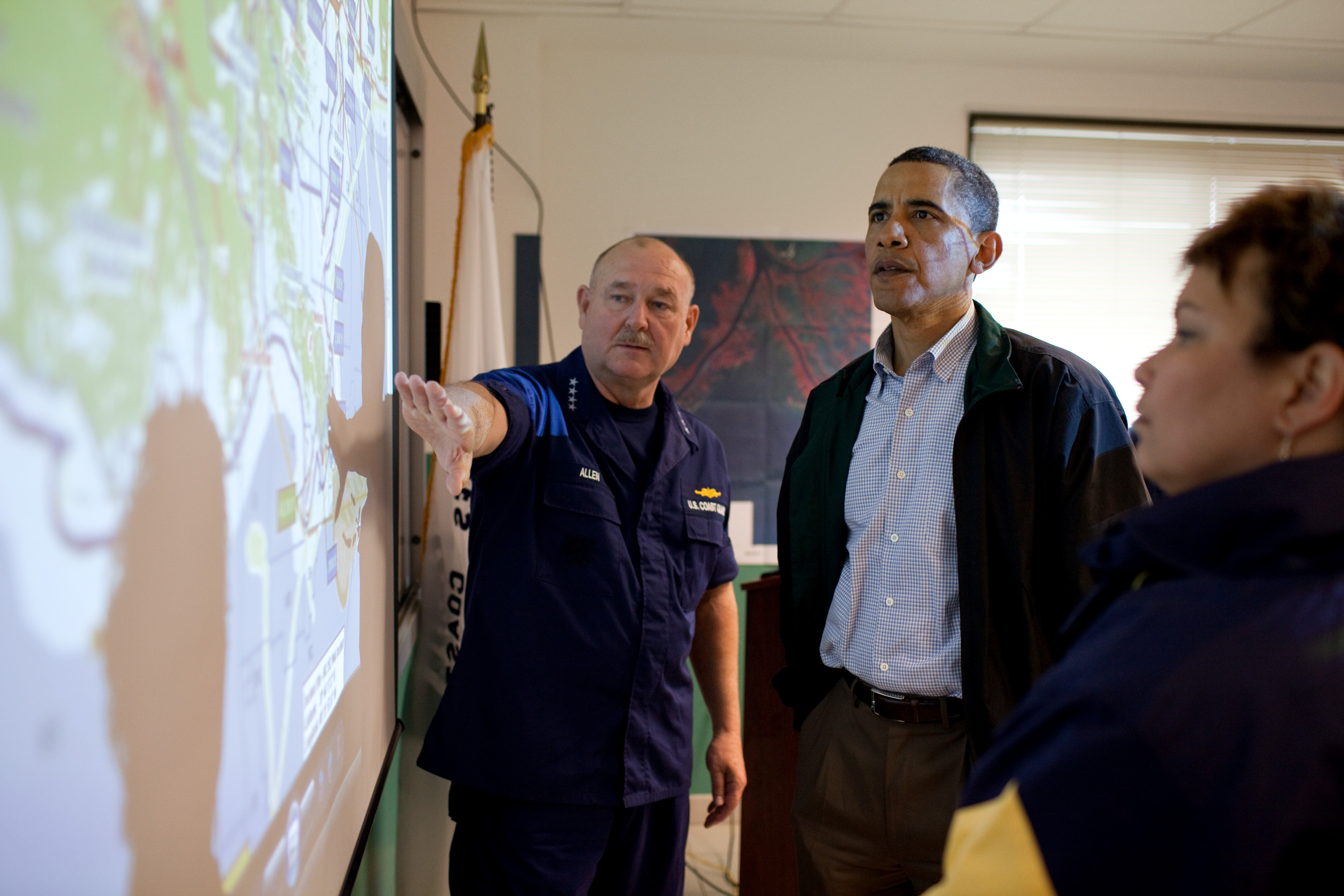
US Coast Guard Commandant Admiral Thad Allen, the Federal Incident commander, briefs President Obama and EPA administrator Lisa Jackson on the containment and response efforts, at USCG Venice Center, Venice, La, 2 May 2010.

High-profile events during the Obama presidency focused attention on the risks of deepwater oil drilling in the EEZ of the U.S. The April 2010 explosion of the Macondo well, the resulting fire and sinking of the Deepwater Horizon drilling platform, and the oil spill in the Gulf of Mexico occurred shortly after the Interior Department released an ambitious five-year plan for oil and gas development of the U.S. outer continental shelf (OCS). President Obama ordered a moratorium on OCS drilling and appointed a bipartisan committee to determine the causes of the blowout and to recommend policies to prevent future disasters. The commission found major problems in the structure and implementation of the National Contingency Plan under the Oil Pollution Act of 1990, which was enacted following the Exxon Valdez oil spill in Alaska. The Department of Interior agencies responsible for overseeing OCS energy development were reorganized to separate leasing and revenues from safety regulation and enforcement.

In 2015, hundreds of kayakers, led by a Native American canoer from the Lummi Nation, protested plans to drill for oil and gas in the Beaufort Sea and Chukchi Sea. They surrounded a drilling rig in waters off Seattle, Washington and prevented its departure. After a series of mishaps Shell Oil suspended its drilling operations in waters off Alaska. In December, 2016, under the authority of the U.S. Outer Continental Shelf Lands Act of 1953, a new Arctic policy of Barack Obama included actions to remove almost all U.S. Arctic waters (as well as large portions of the NW Atlantic continental shelf) from the offshore oil program. Ten days after the 2016 presidential election, the Interior Department released its 2017-2022 plan for offshore oil and gas leasing. President Trump issued an order to repeal President Obama's ban on offshore drilling in the 120 million acres of the Arctic Ocean on April 28, 2017. This action was intended to reinstate Arctic OCS tracts into the five-year plan for offshore drilling and thereby revoke the protection of the Arctic Ocean as set forth by President Obama. But this repeal was then reversed when Judge Sharon L. Gleason of the United States District Court for the District of Alaska ruled that President Obama's 2015 and 2016 protection on the Arctic Ocean and portions of the NW Atlantic would remain in full effect until revoked by Congress. She ruled that President Trump's withdrawal of the protections exceeded the authority of the President.

== Global shark fin trade ==
Every year, an estimated 100 million sharks are killed globally. Sharks are an apex predator in the ocean, where they play a large role in maintaining balance in the ecosystem. Sharks are also especially susceptible to over fishing because of their low reproductive rates. The global shark fin trade contributes to the overfishing of sharks. Shark finning is not vital to maintaining or securing food security and overfishing of sharks has widespread effects across the whole ecosystem. To combat the unsustainable global shark fin trade, President Obama signed the Shark Conservation Act of 2009. This act replaced the pre-existing Shark Finning Prohibition Act, implemented in 2000 under the Clinton Administration. The Shark Conservation Act proposed provisions to eliminate a loophole exploited in the 2008 court case US vs Approx. 64,695 Pounds of Shark Fins. The court identified that the SFPA failed to prohibit the transshipment of fins for delivery at a foreign port, outside of US jurisdiction. In response, the Shark Conservation Act of 2009 prohibited the landing, possession or transfer of fins not attached to the carcass between vessels.

In response to declining shark populations as a result of shark finning, the State of California enacted a Shark Fin Law, AB 376, in 2011 which banned the possession and sale of shark fins, making it illegal to sell or serve shark fin soup. In 2012, two Asian-American groups filed lawsuits claiming that the law discriminated against the ancient Chinese cultural uses of shark fin soup. The case was later dismissed by the superior court. In 2013, the U.S. Justice Department sparked controversy regarding the State of California's 2011 law when it filed an amicus brief in a lawsuit challenging the Shark Fin Law. In upholding the California law, the U.S. court of appeals did not agree that the state shark fin ban interfered with the purposes of the federal Magnuson-Stevens Fishery Conservation and Management Act, under which a small commercial shark fishery is authorized in the NW Atlantic. The Magnuson-Stevens Fishery Conservation and Management Act passed in the 1976 to help manage U.S. coastal fisheries to avoid exploitation and overfishing. In addition, the NOAA assistant administrator for fisheries later determined that state and territorial laws banning possession and trade in shark fins are consistent with, and not subject to federal preemption by, the Magnuson-Stevens Act, which is designed to prevent overfishing and ensure a sustainable seafood supply. The Magnuson-Stevens Act's primary goal was to regulate foreign pressures on local fisheries, but does not account for the increased pressures of local recreational fishing. To enact major changes, the institution requires reform in order to achieve sustainability of commercial fisheries, including the shark fin industry.

Although the Shark Conservation Act of 2009 prohibited the removal of any shark fins including the tail while out at sea, it contained a major loophole. The language of the act specifies that it applies to vessels at sea, and does not directly ban the possession of shark fins still attached to the shark carcass on land. Under this act, fisherman are required to wait until they returned to land to de-fin the shark. This forced consumers to look to international markets for shark fins and allowed US fishermen to continue shark finning as long as they were on land. On January 23, 2019, Representatives Gregorio Kilili Camacho Sablan and Tulsi Gabbard introduced the Shark Fin Sales Elimination Act of 2019 to the House of Representatives. After being passed and agreed to in the house, the bill has now been introduced to the Senate by Senator Cory Booker. This bill would correct the loophole exploited in the Shark Conservation Act by making it illegal to transport, possess, sell, offer for sale, or purchase shark fins or products containing shark fins. The Shark Fin Sales Elimination Act of 2019 is intended to eliminate the international market for shark fins into the US. There are a few exceptions to this bill; if shark fins are destroyed or discarded upon the separation of its carcass then that is a lawful practice, if the fins are used for noncommercial purposes as long as that practice is in accordance with state and federal laws, if fins are used for display at museums, universities, or under a person with a permit whose intentions are for research purposes, or if a person is to obtain a permit for noncommercial use. The penalty for this violation is a $100,000 fine or the market value of the fins, whichever is higher.

== Shipping and marine protected species ==
Major policy decisions enhancing the protection of marine mammals and endangered sea turtles in U.S. waters included the removal of sunset provision for vessel restrictions to reduce ship collisions with North Atlantic right whales and the listing of distinct population segments of threatened and endangered sea turtles. Loggerhead sea turtle policies of the Barack Obama Administration (2009-2017) included tightening of regulations to prevent by-catch or incidental takes in commercial fisheries due to mass fishing techniques like Long-line fishing. The speed restrictions were adopted previously under the U.S. Endangered Species Act to reduce death and injury by ship collision with endangered whales. This action made the restrictions permanent. With Barack Obama's Administration they have revamped the Endangered Species Act and added necessary steps to take on how a species is counted endangered. The Trump administration made changes to the Endangered Species Act that economic concerns under considerations before listing a species as endangered. In addition, species that are listed as "threatened" will no longer be under the same protections as endangered species as they were before and will instead be under a review on a case-by-case basis. The Coast Guard conducted a port access routing study (PARs) in the Chukchi Sea, Bering Strait and Bering Sea. The Administration's proposed expansion of the Hawaiian Islands Humpback Whale National Marine Sanctuary, however, was withdrawn due to opposition from the governor of Hawaii. After NOAA denied the Georgia Aquarium's application for a captive display permit for beluga whales, the State of California enacted the Orca Welfare and Safety Act. The ORCA effectively prohibited SeaWorld from continuing its killer whale captive breeding program.

In 2012, the U.S. Fish and Wildlife Service cancelled efforts to establish an experimental population of the southern sea otter in the offshore waters of the central California coast. The goal of the cancelled project was to ensure survival of the species, which is listed as threatened with extinction under the Endangered Species Act of 1973, in the event of a catastrophic oil spill from the increasing tanker operations along the California coast to and from oil terminals and refineries. The program included an otter exclusion zone, a marine area from which sea otters, who are in the process of reestablishing their historic range, would be moved in order to reduce conflicts with commercial shellfish fisheries.

== Marine pollution and protected areas ==
Modest steps were taken to address the problem of marine plastics through legislation and executive agency action. Congress enacted and President Obama signed the Microbead-Free Waters Act 2015, banning the use of micro-plastics in personal care products sold in the U.S. NOAA's marine debris program was active in raising awareness of the problem, supporting research on prevention and mitigation measures, and on retrieving lost and discarded fishing gear that is threatening the survival of endangered marine life through lethal entanglement.

The National Oceanic and Atmospheric Administration approved a proposal by the Mid-Atlantic Fishery Management Council to create the Senator Lautenberg Deep Sea Coral Protection Area. By presidential proclamation under the Antiquities Act of 1906, to protect Deep-water coral habitat in the NW Atlantic, President Obama created the Northeast Canyons and Seamounts Marine National Monument in September, 2016. He also created a Northern Bering Sea Climate Resilience Area by executive order. Ballast water regulation in the United States was pursued by the EPA, to prevent the introduction of aquatic invasive species into ports and estuaries.

== Indigenous peoples' sovereign rights and environmental justice ==
The companies installing the Keystone XL pipeline needed presidential approval before it could be used to bring oil sands from Canada to oil refineries on the Gulf of Mexico coastline. The Obama administration denied the permit in part because of the potential impact to waters on lands of the USA's First Nations. Under the Rivers and Harbors Act, the Army Corps of Engineers denied permits for expansion of coal export facilities near and pipelines crossing Native American lands. President Obama signed a proclamation returning ownership of the submerged lands of certain islands of the Commonwealth of the Northern Mariana Islands and approved regulations allowing traditional indigenous fishing in waters around the northern islands that are part of the Mariana Trench Marine National Monument.

== Climate action and ocean renewable energy development ==
In 2010, President Barack Obama signed an executive order whose purpose was to provide for utilization of ocean resources in an economic and sustainable way to better American lives and future lives. It calls upon states and federal agencies to develop integrated plans for protecting and restoring the resilience of fresh, marine and estuarine water resources, using the best science available to develop policy interventions for sustainability and productiveness, respecting social cultural, recreational and historical values, promoting public awareness, and bringing federal, state and non-governmental agencies together for action, all in a fiscally responsible manner.

Coastal and marine spatial planning (CMSP) is a comprehensive system of science-based and adaptive strategies to identify, facilitate and design the changes needs to reduce conflict and preserve marine ecosystems. Marine spatial planning (MSP) is a process which is a respected part. Approaches differ among locations as well as implementation. Cost and benefits can delay the process. Most plans have several key components in common: a legal order with political capabilities, specifying plan with acute details, the properties supporting the plan should match fiscal and human resources, and revisions should be allowed with input from stakeholders and leniency for modifications.

Other countries have adopted CMSP but in the United States, notably Massachusetts, Florida and Oregon. From June 2009, President Obama was developing an interagency task force to address public comment and outline policies. United States coastal areas were divided into 9 areas, each with a program to address local issues. Another goal was to map out biologically and ecologically important areas surrounding the United States that are necessary for science.

On June 19, 2018, President Donald Trump signed the executive order 13840, Ocean Policy to Advance the Economic, Security, and Environmental Interests of the United States. Its focus was the utilization of the nation's natural water resources in terms of economy, security and global competitiveness with public and federal support and to enhance benefits to both. Its policies include management of natural water resources for economic, security and environmental benefits, enforcement by United States Armed Forces and their right to exercise rights and jurisdiction with national and international law, American employment, use of American goods and enhance America's energy security, ensure policies do not prevent productive and sustainable use of natural resources, while maintaining consultation with state, federal, private, non-governmental agencies and foreign stakeholders.

As part of the Obama Administration's effort to combat global climate change (and climate change denial), the Department of Interior held an auction of wind energy leases off the State of New York in December, 2016. In April, 2016, President Obama and paramount leader Xi Jinping of China announced jointly that they were formally ratifying the Paris climate agreement, the first global agreement to limit greenhouse gas emissions.

Additionally a development in offshore wind energy occurred during the Obama Administration and continued with President Trump support. In 2015 BOEM leased multiple plots of federal waters off the shores of many coastal states for commercial wind energy development. Currently projects in Rhode Island, New York, New Jersey and Connecticut are proving beneficial while efforts in South Carolina, California and Hawaiʻi are projected areas of new development.

== International Law of the Sea ==
In addition to its essential role in shepherding the Paris Agreement on combatting climate change, the Obama administration was active in promoting decisions by the U.S. Congress and, through diplomatic negotiations, at U.N. agencies, the U.N. General Assembly, and other bodies that by international treaty have responsibilities for governing uses of the marine environment. These include the International Whaling Commission (IWC), the International Maritime Organization (IMO), and the Commission for the Conservation of Marine Living Resources (CCAMLR).

Promotion of UNCLOS accession

At a series of hearings before the [Senate Foreign Relations Committee] in May 2012, prominent members of President Obama's administration, including Secretary of State Hillary Clinton and Secretary of Defense Leon Panetta, testified in favor of U.S. ratification of UNCLOS. The U.S. is the only major industrialized nation not to be a party to this global agreement which provides the basis for world public order of the oceans. In 1994, UNCLOS was effectively amended by an U.N. agreement on the implementation of Part XI, the provisions setting forth the regulatory regime for [deep seabed mining]. This agreement, whose negotiations were led by the U.N. Secretary General, removed President Reagan's grounds for voting against UNCLOS when it was opened for signature in 1982. With respect to implementation of the [high seas] provisions of UNCLOS, in June 2015, the U.S. delegation to the U.N. joined the unanimous vote in favor of a [General Assembly resolution] calling for negotiations of an international treaty to provide protection of [marine biodiversity] in [areas beyond national jurisdiction] of any nation, including the [high seas].

Seabed mining

During the Obama Administration, an attempt in 2012 to ratify the Law of the Sea Treaty was put forward to the US Senate by Secretary of State Hillary Clinton. A successful ratification would change the process in which seabed mining licenses are issued for mining sites outside the US EEZs. Under the treaty, license applications would be sent to the International Seabed Authority (ISA) for evaluation opposed to the National Oceanic & Atmospheric Administration (NOAA) as it was under the Deep Seabed Hard Mineral Resources Act of 1980. However, the ratification was unable to successfully pass in the senate as Republican senators banded together to gain majority vote.

In 2012, a subsidiary of the Lockheed Martin Corporation requested an extension of their exploratory licenses from NOAA for two areas of the Clarion–Clipperton zone, a stretch of Pacific seafloor rich in polymetallic nodules, so that it may be further investigated for potential deep seabed mining sites, which was then approved by NOAA. However, in May 2015, a lawsuit was filed against NOAA and US Secretary of Commerce Penny Pritzker by the Center for Biological Diversity (CBD) for approving the extensions. The CBD claimed that NOAA failed to comply with federal laws regarding license extension by approving the extension request without having acquired the Environmental Impact Statements (EIS) from Lockheed Martin necessary to legally approve the extension. The court ruled in favor of the CBD, immediately nullifying the licenses extensions. In 2017, Lockheed Martin would once again request for a license extension for the same two sections of the zone, with NOAA again approving them, but having received the necessary EIS.

In September 2014, President Obama expanded the Pacific Remote Islands Monument, initially created by President George W. Bush, via the Antiquities Act of 1906. By doing this, the area for prospective seabed mining exploration in the Pacific Ocean was significantly reduced due to the new protections. Obama would repeat this process on a larger scale two years later with both the creation of the Northeast Canyons and Seamounts Marine National Monument, and the expansion of the Papahanaumokuakea Marine National Monument, further decreasing the possible mining areas in both the Pacific and Atlantic Oceans. Following the election of Donald J. Trump as president in 2017, attempts were made to rollback these protections by presidential action, while New England and Mid-Atlantic fishermen challenged Obama's use of the Antiquities Act to create the Atlantic marine national monument off Massachusetts. The federal courts, however, rejected the fishermen's argument that since the U.S. EEZ is subject only to sovereign rights and not national ownership under international law the Antiquities Act cannot be used to protect marine ecosystems from extractive activity.

In March 2018, research was published that concluded that deep seabed mining cannot be attained without significant net biodiversity loss, even with the strictest of measurements being in place. Eight months later, the Trump Administration released an ocean science and technology report summarizing the goals for ocean research over the next decade, including goals for deep seabed mining research. A year later, the Trump administration released a fact sheet and an presidential memorandum placing a focus on ocean exploration and seafloor mapping of the EEZ off the Alaskan coasts in order to examine the bathymetry for resources within the EEZ, including critical minerals for future potential seabed mining operations.

Freedom of navigation in the South China Sea

In marine-related foreign relations, President Obama authorized additional operations, known as FONOPs, under the U.S. Navy's [Freedom of Navigation Program]. The U.S. Navy carries out FONOPs in maritime spaces that are subject to claims of jurisdiction or sovereign rights by coastal States which the U.S. believes are excessive and infringe upon the freedom of navigation and overflight. These excessive claims have often been based on the application of [straight baselines] that depart appreciably from the general direction of the claiming nation's coastline or that do not enclose locally used waters along a deeply indented or island-studded coastline. FONOPs during the Obama Administration focused on the semi-enclosed [South China Sea] and China's broad but ambiguous maritime claims asserted through a series of nine, dashed lines. In the decades-long [Spratly Islands dispute], the U.S. has avoided taking a position on the [territorial disputes in the South China Sea]. Following China's 2009 submission of a note verbale to the [U.N. Commission on the Limits of the Continental Shelf] opposing the joint submission of extended continental shelf claims filed by Malaysia and Vietnam and claiming "indisputable sovereignty" based upon historic rights within a [Nine-dashed line], the U.S. State Department published an analysis of this assertion in its [Limits in the Sea] series. The report concluded that China's claims were contrary to established principles of international law. In 2016, the Permanent Court of Arbitration released the long-awaited decision of the special arbitral tribunal established under UNCLOS's Annex VII upon the application of the Philippines. This case, [Philippines v. China], revolved around the actions by China to interfere with fishing activities in its EEZ in the area of submerged reefs and coral atolls that China built up into military bases through extensive land reclamation activities. The U.S. was not a party to the [South China Sea Arbitration], but the dispute concerned Chinese claims the U.S. has opposed through FONOPs by warships and overflight and through diplomatic protests. The Arbitral Tribunal found that the maritime features that China had reclaimed were not naturally formed islands entitled to an EEZ and continental shelf but had been "rocks" as that term is used in UNCLOS Article 121, paragraph 3, known as the [regime of islands]. In a much discussed decision, the tribunal concluded that there was no evidence that any of the features had supported a stable human community "without external additions."

Global moratorium on commercial whaling

The Obama administration continued the diplomatic project of the George W. Bush administration to seek a compromise on the issue of scientific whaling by the Japanese whaling fleet operating in the Southern Ocean Whale Sanctuary. This sanctuary, as well as zero catch quotas for all large whales, was adopted by the International Whaling Commission (IWC). The goal of U.S. diplomacy was to keep Japan from renouncing the International Convention on the Regulation of Whaling (ICRW) it had been a party to for many decades. Japan's efforts at the meetings of the IWC had failed, sometimes only narrowly, to remove the zero quotas from the ICRW's Schedule and to apply revised management procedures adopted by the IWC to set sustainable use quotas for Antarctic minke whale populations. US proposals for a compromise, for a 'future role of the IWC' in cetacean conservation, were debated at IWC meetings in 2010 and 2012.

In its 2014 decision in the case of Whaling in the Antarctic, Australia v. Japan: New Zealand Intervening [Japan whaling case] the International Court of Justice (ICJ) ruled that Japan's program of granting special permits for lethal research, known as JARPA II, pursuant to article VIII of the whaling convention (ICRW), was not whaling for purposes of scientific research. After the ICJ's decision, the U.S. opposed efforts by Japan to limit the impact of the decision on the consideration of future research programs conducted by Japan. Late in 2018, Japan announced its withdrawal from the IWC and plan to recommence commercial whaling in Japan's EEZ and territorial waters. Scholars noted that this action raised questions regarding the implications of [UNCLOS Article 65] on whaling in the EEZ. Article 65 states that "Nothing in this Part [on the EEZ regime] restricts the right of a coastal State or the competence of an international organization, as appropriate, to prohibit, limit or regulate the exploitation of marine mammals more strictly than provided for in this Part. States shall cooperate with a view to the conservation of marine mammals and in the case of cetaceans shall in particular work through appropriate international organizations for their conservation, management and study." In Article 62, the duty of the coastal State is to "promote optimum utilization of the living resources in the EEZ without prejudice to article 61." That article requires, inter alia, that the coastal State shall ensure, using the best scientific evidence available to it, that living resources are not endangered by over-exploitation, and cooperates with the appropriate international organizations to that end.

It is not known if members of the U.S. Congress considered resolutions in 2019 and 2020 calling on the then-present administration to invoke provisions of the Pelly Amendment. This U.S. law allows the levying of trade sanctions in the form of import bans against nations that undermine international conservation agreements. In the past, violations of agreements that have triggered certification and possible trade sanctions have included violations of the ICRW, which establishes the IWC and its schedule of quotas and regulations, and the Convention on International Trade in Endangered Species of Wild Fauna and Flora (CITES), which bans trade between parties in whale meat or other products. During the Obama administration, Iceland started a new program of commercial whaling with a view towards sales to Japan, triggering calls from conservation groups for the U.S. to levy trade sanctions under the Pelly Amendment. In 2011, in a message to Congress, President Obama concluded that further diplomatic efforts would be undertaken to end [Icelandic whaling] before trade sanctions would be imposed against that Atlantic nation.

Marine protected areas in the EEZ

The Obama administration set an important international precedent for ocean conservation and protection of sensitive marine environments in the expansion of the no-take MPAs in the U.S. EEZs around the Northwestern Hawaiian Islands archipelago and Line Islands in the Pacific Ocean. The U.S. was then involved indirectly in the U.K.'s establishment of a vast marine protected area in the EEZ around the Chagos Islands archipelago in the Indian Ocean. The U.K.'s protected area excluded from the MPA the waters around Diego Garcia, an atoll that the U.S. leases from the U.K. government for use as a naval base. An UNCLOS tribunal ruled in Mauritius v. U.K. that the protected area was wrongly established in light of Britain's commitment to return the Chagos islands and their surrounding waters to Mauritius once they were no longer needed. Consultations with Mauritius prior to the Protected Area's creation were perfunctory and in violation of UNCLOS duties to consult and behave in good faith with respect to the rights of other coastal states.

The U.S. actively supported the creation of MPAs in the waters surrounding Antarctica at meetings of CCAMLR, the commission created by agreement to manage and protect the living resources of the Southern Ocean. Krill fisheries in the Southern Ocean have expanded in recent years as have fisheries for Antarctic toothfish.
