= Carlos Rafael =

Carlos Rafael may refer to:

- Carlos Rafael do Amaral (born 1983), Brazilian football midfielder
- Carlos Rafael Fernández (born 1954), Argentine economist and former Minister of the Economy of Argentina
- Carlos Jorge (athlete) (Carlos Rafael Jorge; born 1986), long jumper from the Dominican Republic
- Carlos Meneses Lambis (Carlos Rafael Meneses Lambis born 1965) Panamanian criminal
- Carlos Rafael Rodríguez (1913–1997), Cuban politician
  - The University of Cienfuegos "Carlos Rafael Rodríguez" (Spanish: Universidad de Cienfuegos "Carlos Rafael Rodríguez", UCF), a university located in Cienfuegos, Cuba
- Carlos Rafael Uribazo Garrido (born 1951), Cuban artist
- Carlos Rafael (fishing) (born 1952), Portuguese-American commercial fishing businessman and former owner of Carlos Seafoods Inc.
