= Sylvester Ayek =

Iñupiaq artist and sculptor (born 1940)

Sylvester Anaiyuk Ayek (born 1940) is an Iñupiaq artist and sculptor. He's a native of King Island, Alaska and has his art displayed in museums across North America. While Ayek specializes in ivory and wood carving, he's particularly interested by unconventional materials and non-traditional carving techniques.

== Early life ==
Sylvester Ayek, born in 1940, originated from King Island, Alaska where he embraced the traditional Inupiaq lifestyle. Ayek's mother, Mary, was from the Kigituk group, while his father, Frank, was from the Ayiik community. In the 2015 interview with Sven D. Haakanson Jr., Ayek revealed that his father died when he was very young, which left the responsibility of the household and 12 children to his mom Mary. Ayek began wood and ivory carving as a young boy and mimicked the work of his elders. He picked up the craft of ivory carving from witnessing the care and respect his father had for animals during harvesting. Ayek used this as an opportunity to generate income and cherish the animals in his minimalist way of life. At age twelve, Ayek moved with his family from King Island to Anchorage and Nome, where he currently resides today. He obtained his post-secondary education from the University of Alaska Fairbanks and Alaska Pacific University.

== Artistic career ==
Sylvester began his artistic journey with Ronald Senungetuk. As an art teacher, Ronald introduced him to non-traditional art and inspired him to work with unconventional tools and materials. He went on to spend a year with another art instructor, Gerald Conway, who perceived the world itself as an expression of visual art. In an interview with Dawn Biddison, the Alaska native and contemporary elements were highlighted as significant aspects in Ayek's work. In conversation with other artists, Ayek has mentioned the limitations imposed by the audience's perception of traditional and Indigenous art. As his craft evolved, Sylvester's artistry and personal aspirations have been influenced by other Indigenous, English and American artists like Fred Anderson, Jim Schoppert, Earl Mayac, Henry Moore, and Alexander Calder.

== Museum collections and awards ==
Ayek's artworks are accessible at public galleries and exhibitions from Alaska to southern Canada. Some international museums that hold Sylvester Ayek's work are the Anchorage Museum of History and Art and the National Museum of the American Indian. A key award in his career was the Rasmuson Distinguished Artist Award.

== Visual art ==
=== Kayak ===
This printed drawing was created in 1973 and is held in the National Museum of the American Indian. The illustration was created using lithography and depicts a black and white kayak.

=== Musk, Ox ===
This sculpture was created in 1971 and resides in the Anchorage Museum of History and Art. It's an ivory vintage carving of the cattle.

=== Untitled Mask ===
This traditional mask draws inspiration from a historical design before the 20th century. The art showcases the wide array of cultures and artistic styles across Alaska’s Indigenous communities. It's located in The Alaska Gallery under the section titled "The Eskimo".

=== Two Ravens Green Soapstone ===
The indigenous artwork depicts two ravens on top of the sculpture and an incised drawing on the base. The drawing illustrates a shaman performing the traditional Raven dance, with a raven's head and a drum.

=== Ivory Right Whales in the Round Eskimo Art ===
This ivory carving is sculpted from a walrus tusk. The fine carving depicts a group of whales with a negative space in the center of the sculpture.

== Filmography ==
Year	Film	Role	Notes
2012	Handmade Portraits: The Bone Carver	Himself	Etsy's Handmade Portraits series
