= Arctic policy of Barack Obama =

Map of the Northern Bering Sea Climate Resilience Area attached to President Obama's executive order 13754

Early on in his campaign for election, former president Barack Obama made it clear that climate change was a priority for his administration. Soon after becoming President Elect in November 2008, he reiterated this positing stating: “Now is the time to confront this challenge once and for all. Delay is no longer an option. Denial is no longer an acceptable response.” Contradictory to his 2008 campaign promises on the Offshore drilling debate, Obama felt obliged to open coastal areas off the Alaskan coast to exploratory assessments for oil and gas as a means to continue to stimulate economic growth. This decision in March 2010 was abruptly reversed in May 2010 after the catastrophic failure of the Deep Water Horizon drilling operation, which led to the six-month moratorium on deep water drilling in the United States territorial waters.

Deemed an economic necessity, Obama moved forward on his promised goals for climate resilience throughout both his terms as president. He drafted many executive orders on climate-oriented issues, three of which focused specifically on resilience. Obama drafted Executive Order 13653: Preparing the United States for the Impacts of Climate Change in 2013, Executive Order 13677: Climate-Resilient International Development in 2014, and Executive Order 13754: Northern Bering Sea Climate Resilience in 2016, which created the Northern Bering Sea Climate Resilience Area.

Soon after signing the Northern Bering Sea Climate Resilience Executive Order on December 20, 2016, former President Obama and Prime Minister Trudeau released the United States-Canada Joint Arctic Leaders’ Statement. The statement outlined the future approach of the United States and Canada as role models for Arctic resilience in overlapping exclusive economic zones. It also outlined science-based leadership plans to manage actions in the Arctic, ensuring: "sustainable and viable Arctic economy and ecosystem with low-impact shipping, science based management of marine resources, and free from the future risks of offshore oil and gas activity."

Overview of USCG Proposed Routing in Vicinity of Bering Strait

== Port Access Route (PAR) Study: In the Chukchi Sea, Bering Strait and Bering Sea ==
see also: Marine Safety (USCG), Northeast Passage, Arctic shipping routes "The Seventeenth Coast Guard District believes that this study demonstrates that implementation of vessel routing measures is warranted in the Bering Strait and Bering Sea. Since the Bering Strait is recognized as an international strait, and it already sees usage by vessels from many different nations, routing measures should be pursued through the International Maritime Organization. The Bering Strait Port Access Route Study developed seven alternatives for routing measures that have been determined to have merit. While the Seventeenth Coast Guard District recommends adoption of Alternative 1 as its preferred alternative...The Seventeenth Coast Guard District also recommends adoption of alternatives 4, 5, 6, and 7, which would implement four Areas to be Avoided. Charts of these alternatives are below, along with a narrative highlighting the differences between the alternatives. Routing measures would apply to vessels of 400 gross tons and larger, as a review of traffic patterns demonstrated these are the vessels that will use them."—The Seventeenth Coast Guard District The Coast Guard announced a port access route study of the Bering Strait in the Federal Register on November 8, 2010, with the purpose of soliciting public comments on whether a vessel routing system was needed and if it could increase vessel safety in the area. Following this, on December 5, 2014 the Coast Guard announced its intent to continue the evaluation started in 2010 by expanding the study area to include most of the Bering Sea, proposing a two-way route as a vessel routing system, while creating four Areas to be Avoided (ATBA). It released its final report on February 27, 2017 recommending adoption of Alternatives 1, 4, 5, 6 and 7 and is requesting additional public comments until May 30, 2017 11:59 PM ET.

=== Alternative 1 ===
The originally proposed two-way route, optimized to minimize the risk of vessel collisions. This route takes vessel traffic through Northern Right Whale Critical Habitat. The reasoning for passing through the whale habitat was that adjusting the route to avoid the habitat would increase route by 31 nautical miles, which the Coast Guard believes most vessels would not follow. Citing a longer route that avoids this critical habitat area would likely lead to less predictability traffic patterns with a higher degree of collision risk that could adversely affect the critical habitat area.

=== Alternative 2 & 3 ===
Not adopted

=== Alternative 4 ===
Public comments that identified this area as being of particularly high concern, due to the presence of Fairway Rock. The Coast Guard stated: "The Area to be Avoided is intended to prevent disruption of subsistence activities, minimize pollution risk, and also alert mariners in the event a navigational error puts a ship in closer proximity than would otherwise occur had the vessel remained within the two-way route...It serves as a migration corridor for every species that migrates between the Bering Sea and Arctic Ocean. It is also a vitally important area for subsistence hunting, particularly bowhead whales, beluga whales and walrus, and ice seals."

=== Alternative 5 ===
Public comments that identified this area as being of particularly high concern, in particular from Kawarek, Inc., due to the presence of King Island. Concerns included not just the use of Kink Island as a subsistence harvesting area, but also the historic heritage of King Island itself. This area to be avoided is intended to prevent disruption of subsistence activities, minimize pollution risk, and alert mariners of shallow waters.

=== Alternative 6 ===
Public comments that identified this area as being of particularly high concern, due to the presence of Saint Lawrence Island. Residents of Gambell and Savoonga noted the eastern tip of St. Lawrence Island was vitally important to subsistence activities. Review of vessel traffic patterns revealed a number of ships passing relatively close to the island through waters where hydrographic survey confidence is low, thus, the area to be avoided is intended to prevent disruption of subsistence activities, minimize pollution risk, and alert mariners of shallow waters. The Coast Guard also stated: "The large portion of the Area to be Avoided to the south of Saint Lawrence Island is intended as an additional protection for the endangered Spectacled Eider. Nearly the entire population of this species congregates in this area each winter, putting the species at unusually high risk in the event of a widespread release of oil following a marine casualty."

=== Alternative 7 ===
"The Area to be Avoided around Nunivak Island is intended to prevent disruption of subsistence activities, minimize pollution risk, and alert mariners to shoal waters in close proximity to the proposed two-way route where the consequences of a grounding could be particularly severe. The Coast Guard received several public comments that identified this area as being of particularly high concern."
