= King Island Native Community =

The King Island Native Community (Inupiaq: Ugiuvaŋmiut) (consisting of what was once approximately 200 Iñupiat at its peak) is federally recognized by the Bureau of Indian Affairs as a community of Alaska Natives.

The Iñupiat, former inhabitants of King Island, called themselves Aseuluk, 'people of the sea', or Ugiuvaŋmiut, 'people of Ugiuvak'.

== Early history ==
The Ugiuvaŋmiut wintered in Ugiuvak/King Island for well over 1000 years. They were hunters who hunted seals and walruses, fished for crabs, and gathered bird eggs (among other things) for food. The island itself was able to sustain 200 people year-round.

== Outside influence ==
Even though King Island ended up being US territory, Russian interest in it was much greater. One report by Dorothy Jean Ray gives an insight into the Russian's observations/opinions on King Island.

Another expedite of interest was Bernard R. Hubbard, who brought Catholicism to the Island, and he ended up living on the Island in 1937 and 1938. The Ugiuvaŋmiut were devout Catholics, and statue of Christ the King – brought by Hubbard – is on the 700 ft high cliffs. A church also existed on the island until the 1980s, when it was dismantled due to risk of collapse.

== Decline ==
The gold rush in the 1900s brought an unfathomable wave of mixed races of men and women to Nome, Alaska, where the King Island residents were still relocating to at the time. With the turn of the times and more and more outsiders relocating to Nome, along with the school closing down on King Island and its only teacher instructed to teach on the mainland, the islanders were forced to leave. The majority of King Islanders now reside in Nome, and some of the elders who have memories of living there are still alive.

== Architecture ==
Architecture was a huge aspect in Ugiuvaŋmiut life, seeing the location of Ugiuvak (settlement) is on a 30° to 45° slope, compared to Little Diomede at an approximately 5° angle.

The winter-houses made of stone are highly likely to be the earlier form of housing for the Ugiuvaŋmiut, and over time it is thought they transitioned over to the stilt-houses.

== Culture ==
It is more faintly recalled as a tradition for Ugiuvaŋmiut women to sing on top of the rocks by the shore to welcome any new visitor.

== See also ==
- King Island, Alaska
- List of Alaska Native Tribal Entities
