= Executive Order 13754 =

2016 United States executive order

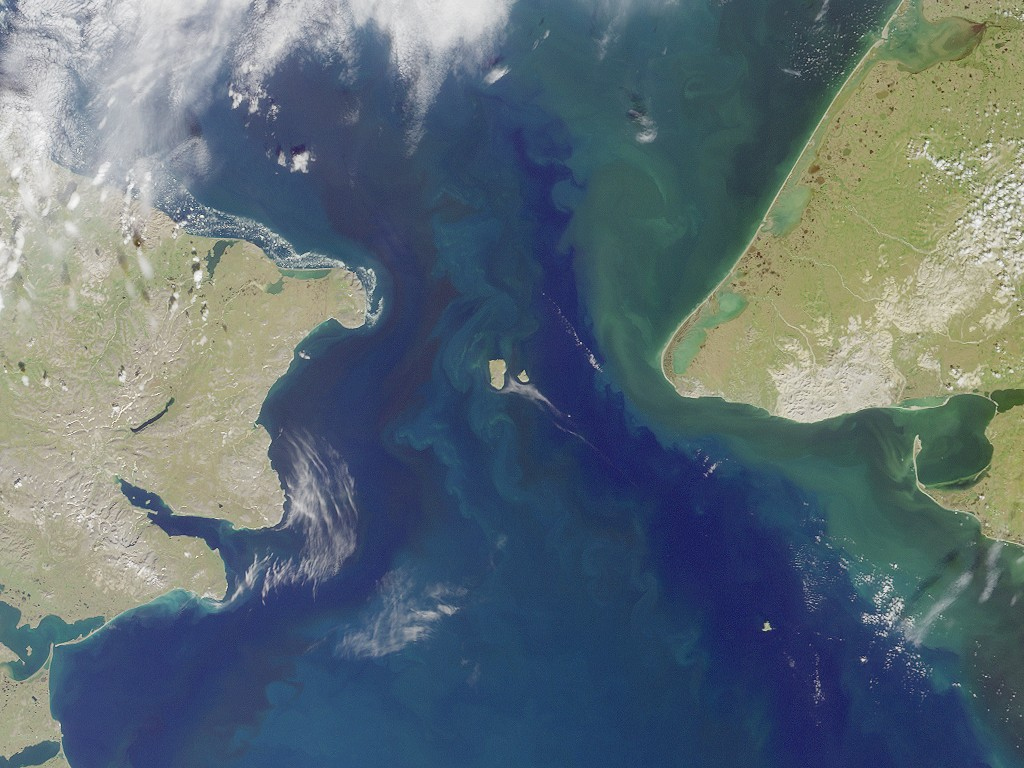
Bering Strait Region, a portion of the region protected under the Climate Resilience executive order 2016

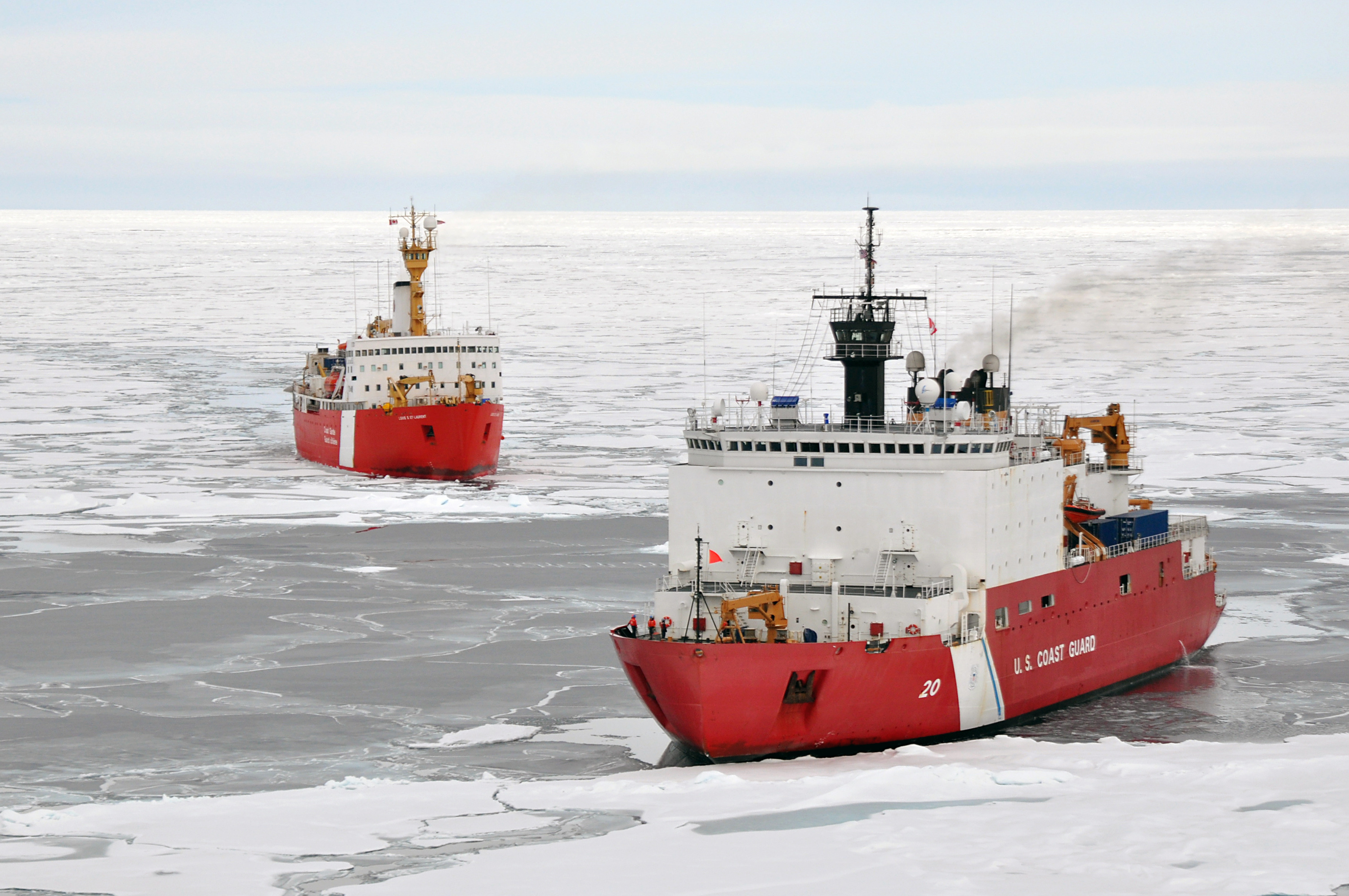
USCG ice cutters navigating through the Bering Sea ice

The Bering Strait has become vulnerable to climatic changes, trans Arctic shipping, and resource exploitation. The Obama administration's Executive Order 13754 of December 9, 2016 defines a Northern Bering Sea Climate Resilience Area that gives protection to the indigenous coastal communities that rely on the strait for subsistence hunting, and the surrounding marine ecosystem's vitality. It exists within the U.S exclusive economic zone and within maritime boundaries agreed upon between the Soviet Union and the U.S. The ecosystem, civilization, and international trade all rely on each other, thus encouraging the establishment of the sensitive marine areas in the Bering Strait. The executive order was upheld by international climate goals, and environmental management standards. Since the location is of international interest, it became vital to protect this area from further exploitation in the oil and shipping industry.

== Background ==
A map of the sanctioned resilience area, and lease withdrawal region

This executive order was a response to delegates from the Bering Sea Elders Group who sought advice from the administration. Considering Arctic biodiversity preservation, a sustainable economy, ecosystem coordination, and proper stewardship, international efforts from environmental managers and climate sciences became recently concerned with the Northern Bering Sea area. The Bering Sea is of particular significance and value due to it being the habitat of multiple large marine mammal migration paths . Anthropogenic factors have become a threat to the benthic habitat and overall Arctic ecosystem which has had an effect on indigenous tribes such as the Yup’ik, Cup’ik and Inupiaq peoples. To ensure the functioning of the human-environment interaction in the Northern Bering Sea, resilience government methods were implemented by the Obama Administration.

== Arctic Climate Change Issues ==
=== Sea Ice recession ===
Due to abnormal weather patterns and warming temperatures in the Arctic and Northern Bering Sea region, sea ice has receded making larger areas of navigable waters available to shipping vessels. The heavy reliance of the indigenous people on the marine environment is now vulnerable with the lack of sea ice during critical points in the seasons. The sea ice loss not only affects the surrounding marine ecosystem but also the local coastal communities making the shoreline vulnerable to storm surges and increased erosion. This has created a double hazard for the marine species populations in the region, with their environment slowly disappearing and also increased ship traffic increasing marine casualties from ship strikes.

== Policy Breakdown ==
=== Lease Withdrawal ===
I hereby withdraw from disposition by leasing for a time period without specific expiration the following areas of the Outer Continental Shelf: (1) the area currently designated by the Bureau of Ocean Energy Management as the Norton Basin Planning Area; and (2) the Outer Continental Shelf lease blocks within the Bureau of Ocean Energy Management's St. Matthew-Hall Planning Area lying within 25 nautical miles of St. Lawrence Island. The boundaries of the withdrawn areas are more specifically delineated in the attached map and, with respect to the St. Matthew-Hall Planning Area, the accompanying table of withdrawn Outer Continental Shelf lease blocks. Both the map and table form a part of this order, with the table governing the withdrawal and withdrawal boundaries within the St. Matthew-Hall Planning Area. This withdrawal prevents consideration of these areas for future oil or gas leasing for purposes of exploration, development, or production. This withdrawal furthers the principles of responsible public stewardship entrusted to this office and takes due consideration of the importance of the withdrawn area to Alaska Native tribes, wildlife, and wildlife habitat, and the need for regional resiliency in the face of climate change. Nothing in this withdrawal affects rights under existing leases in the withdrawn areas.

The above quote states word for word from the executive order the details of the withdrawal of oil exploration and exploitation to prevent further anthropogenic harm to the Northern Bering Sea marine region. This withdrawal will also prevent further oil spill damage to the surrounding areas by reducing the exploitation of oil and benthic habitat disturbance. The USCG (U.S Coast Guard) was said to have been working in compliance with the National Contingency Plan to prepare the village first responders with the best possible means.

=== Traditional knowledge in decision making ===
The functioning of the surrounding Bering Sea ecosystem has a reciprocating relationship from the perspective of the coastal Alaskan tribe communities who rooted their culture around the ecosystem. The Obama Administration included traditional knowledge and Alaskan NGO outreach in the executive decision. The Intergovernmental Tribal Advisory Council was the first of its kind established to ensure traditional knowledge of the indigenous communities was included in federal decision making for the continuation in the Bering Sea Resilience Area protection initiatives.

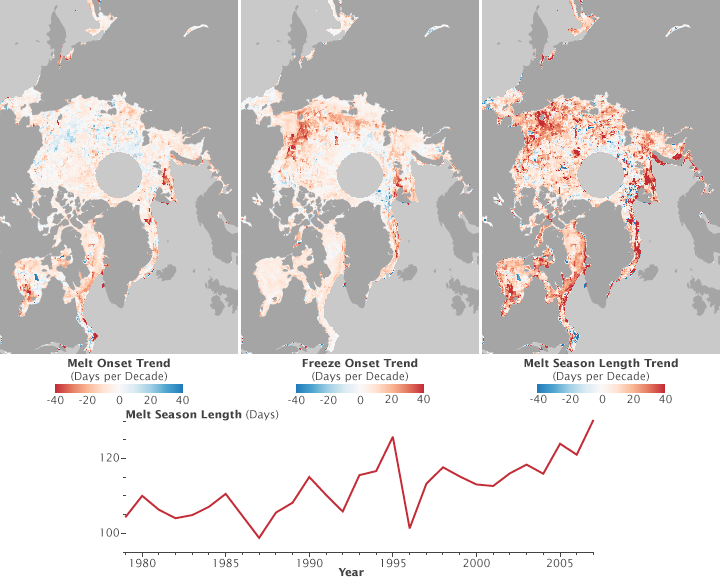
Sea ice seasonal variations. In recent years the amount of sea ice that survives the summer warming period has become smaller, and the warming periods have been increasing in length.
