= Joan Kane =

American poet

Joan Naviyuk Kane
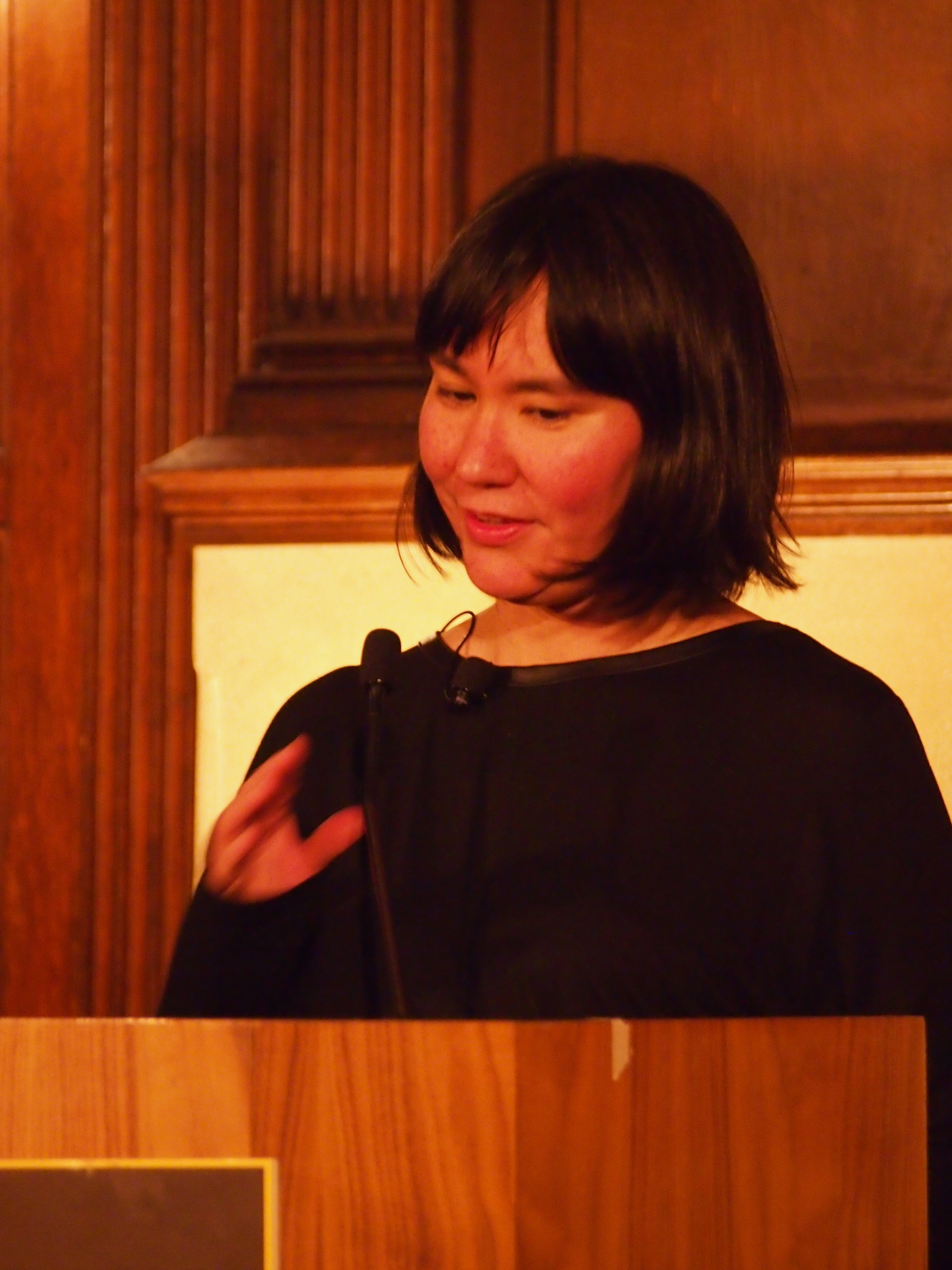
- Kane reading at the Lannan Center for Poetics and Social Practice, Georgetown University, in 2014
- Born: Joan Marie Kane
- Education: Harvard College; Columbia University
- Writing career
- Genres: Poet, novelist
- Website: thejoankane.com

Joan Naviyuk Kane is an Inupiaq American poet. In 2014, Kane was the Indigenous Writer-in-Residence at the School for Advanced Research. She was also a judge for the 2017 Griffin Poetry Prize. Kane was awarded a Guggenheim Fellowship in 2018. She has faculty appointments in the English departments of Harvard College, Tufts University, University of Massachusetts, Boston, and most recently, Reed College.

== Life ==
Joan Kane is Inupiaq, having family from King Island and Mary's Igloo, Alaska. She graduated from Harvard College with a BA and earned an M.F.A from Columbia University.

She lived in Cambridge, Massachusetts with her two children. As of 2023, Kane serves as the Visiting Associate Professor of Creative Writing at Reed College in Portland, Oregon.

== Awards ==
- 2004: John Haines Award from Ice Floe Press
- 2006: Walt Whitman Award semi-finalist by the Academy of American Poets
- 2007: Rasmuson Foundation Individual Artist Award
- 2009: Whiting Award
- 2009: National Native Creative Development Program Longhouse Education and Cultural Center Grantee
- 2010: Alaska Native Writers on the Environment Award
- 2012: Donald Hall Prize in Poetry from AWP
- 2013: Native Arts and Cultures Foundation Literature Fellowship
- 2013: Rasmuson Foundation Artist Fellowship
- 2014: Indigenous Writer-in-Residence at School for Advanced Research
- 2014: American Book Award for Hyperboreal
- 2016: Tuttle Creative Residency
- 2016: Rasmuson Foundation Individual Artist Award
- 2016: Aninstantia Foundation Artist Award
- 2017: Lannan Foundation Residency Fellowship
- 2018: John Simon Guggenheim Foundation Fellowship
- 2019: Radcliffe Institute for Advanced Study at Harvard University Fellowship
- 2023: Paul Engle Prize

== Works ==
- "Insomnia at North", AGNI, 3/2006
- Due North, Columbia University, 2006
- Cormorant Hunter’s Wife, NorthShore Press, 2009, ISBN 9780979436529; University of Alaska Press, 2012, ISBN 9781602231573
- Hyperboreal. University of Pittsburgh Press. October 21, 2013. ISBN 978-0-8229-7914-2.
- Milk Black Carbon. University of Pittsburgh Press. 2017. ISBN 978-0-8229-6451-3
- The Straits. Voices from the American Land, 2015. V.4, Issue 2
- A Few Lines in the Manifest. Albion Books. 14 May 2018.
- Sublingual. Finishing Line Press. 2 November 2018. ISBN 978-163534769-2
- Another Bright Departure. CutBank Books. March 2019. ISBN 978-1-9397-1730-6.
- Dark Traffic. University of Pittsburgh Press. 2021. ISBN 978-0-8229-6662-3
- Ex Machina, Staircase Books. 7 June 2023. ISBN 9781960769008
- Circumpolar Connections: Creative Indigenous Geographies of the Arctic. Wesleyann University Press. 2024. ISBN 9780819501882
- with snow pouring southward past the window. University of Pittsburgh Press. 2026. ISBN 9780822967668.

=== Play ===
- The Gilded Tusk, won the Anchorage Museum script contest

=== In Anthology ===
- Best American Poetry, Simon & Schuster, 2015.
- Monticello in Mind, University of Virginia Press, 2016. ISBN 978-0813938509
- Read America(s). Locked Horns Press, 2016. ISBN 978-0990359920
- Syncretism and Survival, Forums on Poetics. Locked Horns Press, 2017. ISBN 978-0990359937
- Ghost Fishing: An Eco-Justice Poetry Anthology. University of Georgia Press, 2018.ISBN 9780820353159
- The Poem's Country: Place and Poetic Practice. 2018. Pleiades Press. ISBN 978-0-9970994-1-6

== See also ==
- Joan Naviyuk Kane on Wikiquote - https://en.wikiquote.org/wiki/Joan_Naviyuk_Kane
