= Alaska Native Heritage Center =

Cultural center in Anchorage, Alaska, United States

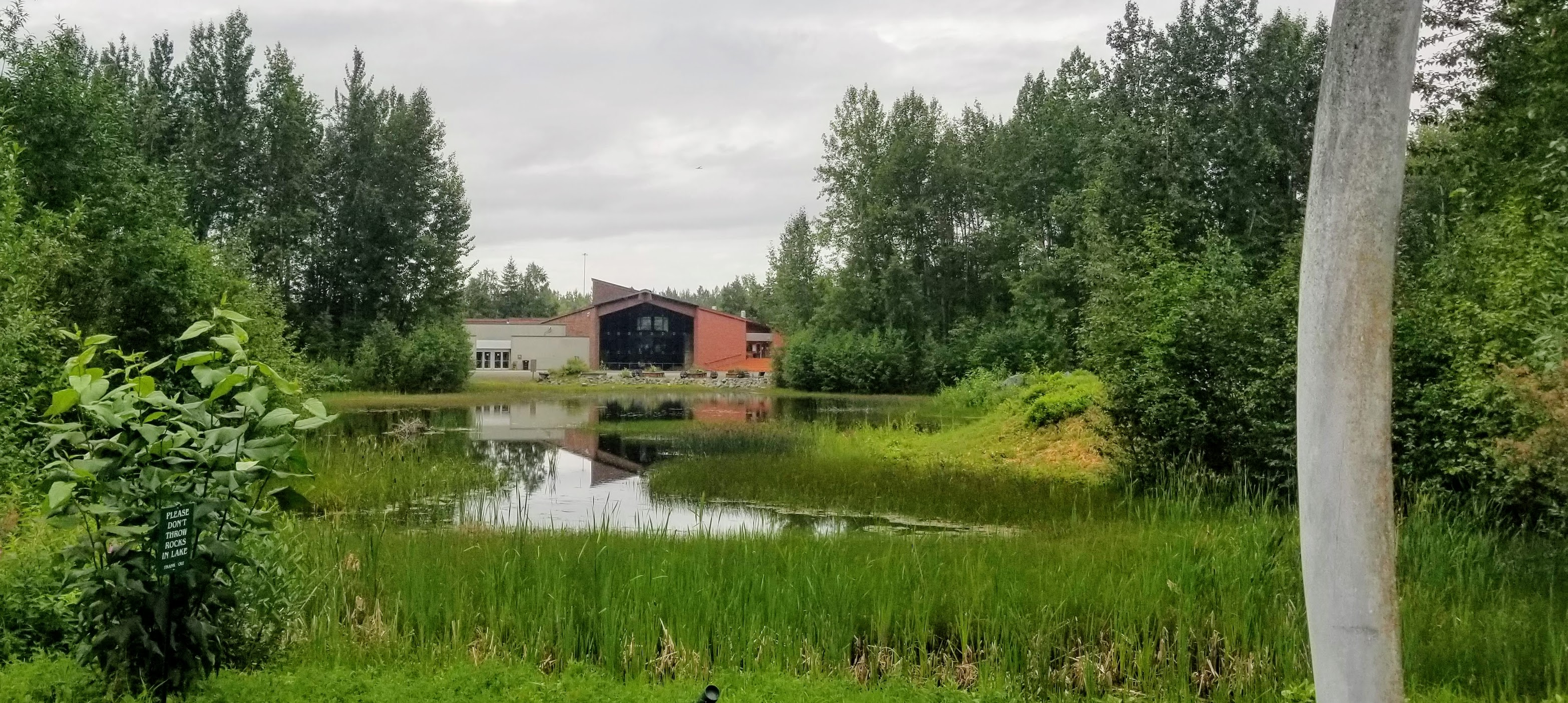
- Alaska Native Heritage Center as viewed across Lake Tiulana
- Established: 1999
- Location: Anchorage, Alaska, United States
- Coordinates: 61.2302°N 149.717°W
- Type: Cultural center
- President: Emily Edenshaw
- Website: www.alaskanative.net

The Alaska Native Heritage Center is an educational and cultural institution for all Alaskans, located in Anchorage, Alaska. The center opened in 1999. The Alaska Native Heritage Center shares the heritage of Alaska's 11 major cultural groups. These 11 groups are the Athabaskan people, Eyak people, Tlingit people, Haida people, Tsimshian people, Unangax people (Aleut), Alutiiq people, Yup'ik, Cup'ik, Siberian Yupik, and Inupiaq.

The Heritage Center, located ten miles from downtown Anchorage, is situated on 26 wooded acres. The Gathering Place provides visitors an opportunity to experience demonstrations of Alaska Native dancing, Native Games, and traditional storytelling. The Hall of Cultures provides rotating exhibits, craft activities for the family, and craft and artwork created by Alaska Native artists. The theatre features rotating films, including a documentary produced by the Heritage Center, titled "Stories Given, Stories Shared." Outside, visitors can tour the village sites, consisting of six life-sized Native dwellings surrounding Lake Tiulana. The six dwellings represent the unique ways of living practiced by the Athabascan, Inupiaq/St. Lawrence Island Yupik, Yup’ik/Cup’ik, Aleut, Alutiiq, and the Eyak, Tlingit, Haida and Tsimshian peoples. The lake itself is named for Iñupiat artist and dancer Paul Tiulana. Youth interns lead many tours of the village sites, which also include artifacts for use in daily life.

The Alaska Native Heritage Center is the only statewide organization which represents all Alaska Native cultures. The nonprofit is operated by Alaska Natives and is one of the few tribally unaffiliated arts organizations that is run by Indigenous people.

From 2019–2025, Emily Edenshaw served as the president and CEO of the center.

== See also ==
- Yupiit Piciryarait Cultural Center
