= Paul Tiulana =

Iñupiat artist and dancer (1921–1994)

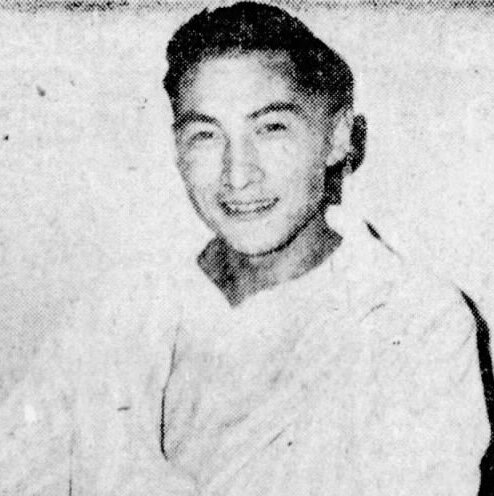
- Tiulana in 1946
- Born: June 20, 1921; King Island (Alaska), United States
- Died: July 17, 1994 (aged 73); Anchorage, Alaska
- Spouse: Clara (m. 1945)

Paul Tiulana (June 20, 1921 – June 17, 1994) was an Iñupiaq artist and dancer from Alaska. Originally from King Island, Tiulana was drafted in World War II and injured; his leg was broken and eventually amputated. He relocated to Nome during the 1950s and Anchorage in the 1960s, where he founded a dance group specializing in Iñupiat dancing. During the 1980s, he was made a Citizen of the Year by the Alaska Federation of Natives, given a National Heritage Fellowship from the National Endowment for the Arts for his work in dance and art, and wrote a book about his life in Alaska.

== Life ==
=== Early life and World War II ===
Paul Tiulana was born on June 20, 1921 on King Island to an Iñupiat family. He was given the name "Tiulana" after his grandfather and the name "Paul" when he was baptized. Tiulana's father Ugitkuna, a Wolf Dancer, (Note: The term "Wolf Dance" may refer to one of several ritual dance performed by several Alaskan communities. The King Island Wolf Dance was performed to allow for the rebirth of the spirits of animals, especially eagles, hunted by the King Islanders. In the dance, a hunter kills an eagle and is told by the eagle's mother to find a drum. Unable to locate the drum on his own, the duty falls to the dancers.) died in a hunting accident when Tiulana was nine and so he was mentored by his uncle, John Olanna, in Inupiat traditions, art, and heritage. He attended formal school on King Island starting when he was nine, but only for a few years.

In the 1940s, Tiulana was drafted to fight in World War II; his leg was broken while he was stationed in Nome. He was treated at a hospital in Washington after doctors incorrectly set the leg, resulting in gangrene that necessitated its amputation. As a result of the injury, he was honorably discharged and returned to Alaska with an Asiatic-Pacific Theater Ribbon. He became depressed and was forced to re-learn subsistence skills, especially hunting. Back on King Island, he married Clara Tiulana in 1945. The next year, Tiulana traveled from Nome to Seattle to be fitted with a high-quality prosthetic leg as a replacement for one he had been given in 1944. Due to his lifestyle, the 1944 limb was too damaged to be of much use.

=== Move to Nome and Anchorage ===
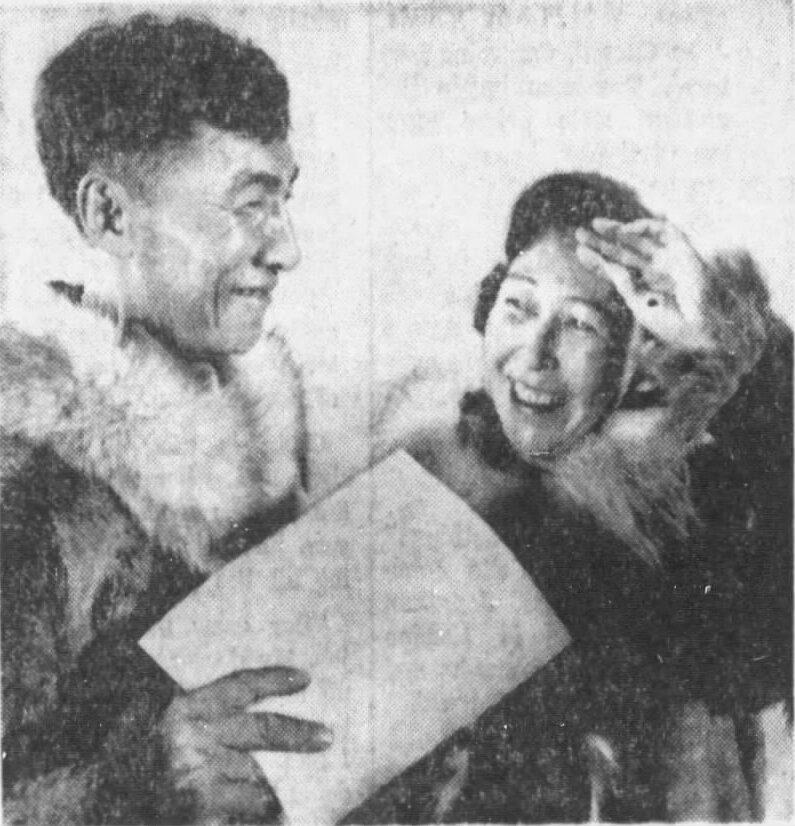
Paul and Clara Tiulana in 1959, in Florida

In the 1950s, the Iñupiat people were moved away from King Island. Tiulana and his family ended up living full time in Nome, where he worked as a janitor in a bank. In 1959, Tiulana was invited to stay, with his wife, at the Hotel Deauville in Miami as part of a publicity stunt likely organized by the owner of the hotel. While he was there, he was asked by a hotel press worker if a women's jacket really was mink; Tiulana identified the coat as rabbit, which caused her embarrassment and was reported on at the time by national newspapers. He also saw his first igloo in Florida, and he and Clara arranged for William A. Egan to donate a polar bear cub to Crandon Park Zoo. He was also made an honorary member of the Miami police department.

While in Nome, Tiulana felt isolated from his culture. He continued the carving he had learnt on King Island and, in 1956, began organizing dances at the local community hall. He and the group traveled from Nome to Anchorage to dance and sell carvings; he moved there permanently in 1967 after getting a job as a coordinator for a law group. The dance group, with Tiulana as their leader, was official founded in Anchorage in the sixties as the King Island Inupiat Singers and Dancers. By 1990, the King Island Inupiat Singers and Dancers had performed all over Alaska and the lower 48, as well as in London and Siberia.

In the late 1960s or early 70s, Tiulana opened up a gift shop in Mountain View, Anchorage. It sold ivory carvings that Tiulana, his family, and other people from King Island had handmade. He taught about drum and boat-making and worked as the director at Alaska Native Welcome Center in Anchorage until sometime before 1980, by which point he had moved to work at the Cook Inlet Native Association; he retired from his job at the association in 1986.

In 1983, he was made the Citizen of the Year by the Alaska Federation of Natives for his efforts to teach King Island Iñupiat culture, in 1984, was given a National Heritage Fellowship from the National Endowment for the Arts for his contributions to art and dance. He was the first Alaskan to receive the NEA fellowship.

In 1987, CIRI published A Place for Winter: Paul Tiulana’s Story. The memoirs, written by Tiulana and Vivian Senungetuk, described life on King Island and Iñupiat culture and incorporated photographs taken in the late 1930s by Jesuit minister Bernard R. Hubbard. A 2002 review in the Anchorage Daily News described the book as an "evocative tribute" to the island and its people. In 1993, Tiulana took part in the opening of a Smithsonian field office at the Anchorage Museum of History and Art.

=== Later life and death ===
In the later years of his life, Tiulana developed arthritis and needed his son's assistance in doing some finer handiwork. His eyesight also deteriorated and he was diagnosed with liver cancer. Tiulana died of his cancer on June 17, 1994, at the Alaska Native Medical Center. A Catholic, his funeral homily was given by Francis Thomas Hurley.

Clara Yamane died of cancer three years later, in 1997. The couple had seven children; five sons and two daughters.

== Legacy ==
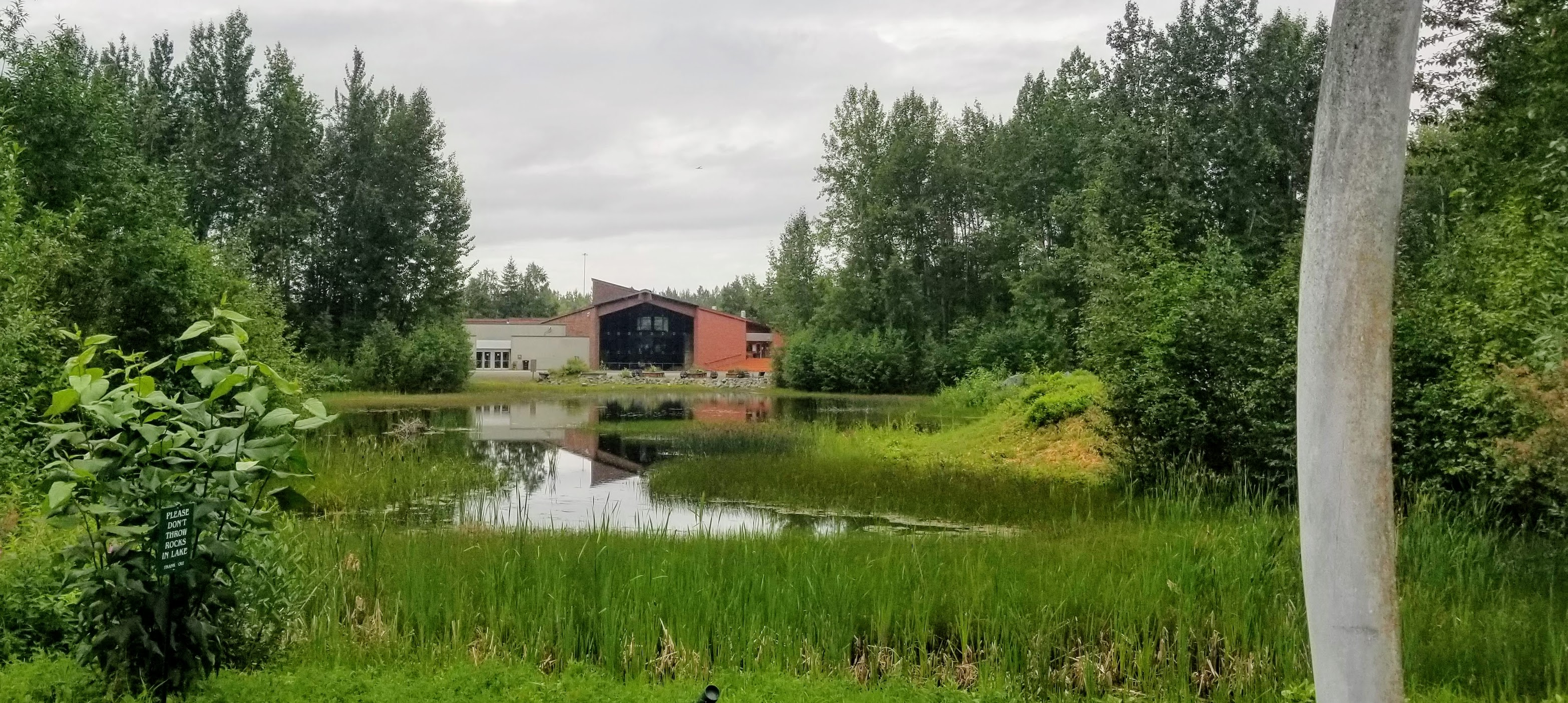
Lake Tiulana in front of the Alaska Native Heritage Center

Four years after Tiulana's death, Vivian Senungetuk published another book based on his writings: Wise Words of Paul Tiulana: An Iñupiat Alaskan's Life.

A lake near the Alaska Native Heritage Center is named after Tiulana. Additionally, the Center gives out an Paul Tiulana Elder Award, named for Tiulana, to Native Alaskan elders they feel have "sustained and advanced Alaska Native culture". In 2023, the award was given to Oliver Aveogan Leavitt.

== Art ==
Tiulana first learned to carve ivory when he was twelve, and he continued to practise carving throughout his adult life. He often made masks, and made many carvings designed to represent life on King Island. He normally took one day to complete most carvings. Tiulana mostly used traditional, handmade tools in his work, many of which he inherited from his father, because he felt they gave him more control and because modern tools could be "too fast, too big, and too hard to handle". In later works, such as a model schooner he completed in 1987, Tiulana used traditional tools and methods alongside more modern equipment such as electric drills and Super Glue. He also shifted to more modern styles and materials, such as gemstones imported from overseas, because he could sell the pieces for more. Speaking on that decision, he said "Sometimes, we have to break our values, even if it doesn't feel right. We live in a cash economy, and I'm doing it to make money."

In the 1980s, Tiulana was commissioned by the Cook Inlet Native Association to make an umiak for display at the Anchorage Museum. It was still on display as of 1987. In 2018, it was taken out of storage from the museum and donated by the Cook Inlet Native Association and CIRI to the Alaska Native Heritage Center.

Tiulana was also a choreographer; he organized the revival of ceremonial King Island Wolf Dances in 1981 or 1982 and 1990. The dance had not been performed in over fifty years, since the 1930 dance Tiluana's father, Ugitkuna, participated in. At the time of the 1980s dance, there were only three remaining King Islanders who remembered how to perform it. It took three months to prepare and was filmed to preserve it.

== Awards and honors ==
- 1983: Alaska Federation of Natives' Citizen of the Year
- 1984: National Heritage Fellowship

== Publications ==
- Tiulana, Paul; Senungetuk, Vivian (1987). A Place for Winter: Paul Tiulana's Story. CIRI. ISBN 978-0-938227-02-1.
- ————— (1998). Senungetuk, Vivian (ed.). Wise Words of Paul Tiulana: An Iñupiat Alaskan's Life. New York: Franklin Watts. ISBN 978-0-531-11448-3.
