= Emily Edenshaw =

Indigenous American nonprofit executive

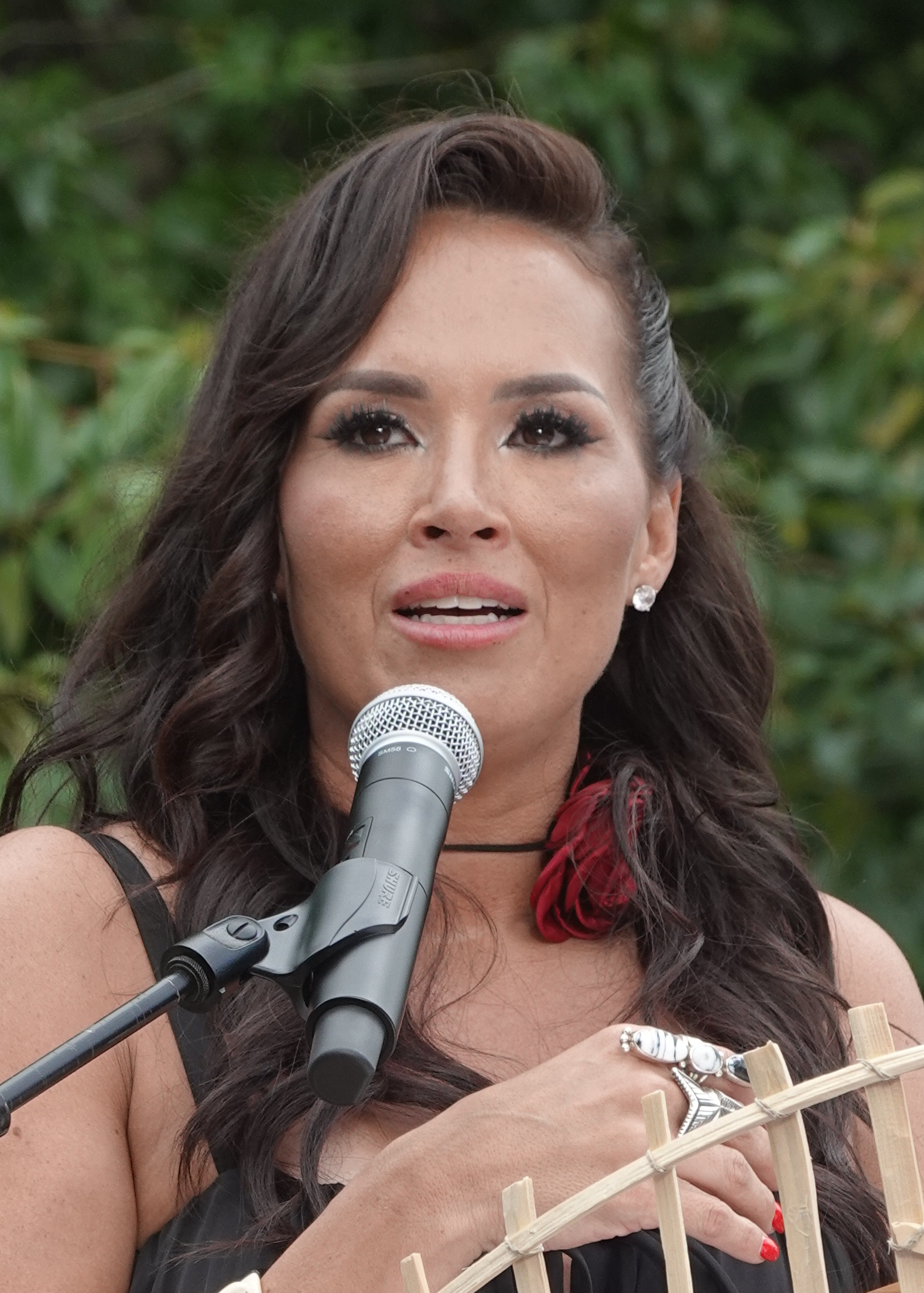
- Edenshaw in 2025
- Born: Texas, U.S.
- Education: University of Alaska Fairbanks
- Occupation: Nonprofit executive
- Employer: Ketchikan Indian Community

Emily Edenshaw is an Indigenous American nonprofit executive. From 2019–2025, she was the president and CEO of the Alaska Native Heritage Center. As of 2025, she is the CEO of the Ketchikan Indian Community.

== Early life ==
Edenshaw was born and raised in Texas, due to her mother's forced adoption in 1956 which moved her away from Alaska. In college, Edenshaw returned to Alaska and adopted the Yup'ik name Keneggnarkayaaggaq, "meaning a person with a beautiful persona, spirit, aura and friend."

== Career ==
In 2019, Edenshaw became the president and CEO of the Alaska Native Heritage Center based in Anchorage, Alaska. She stepped down on July 31, 2025.

In October 2024, Edenshaw was one of 205 people, and one of seven Indigenous people, selected for the six-month-long Obama Leaders program led by the Obama Foundation. In August 2025, Edenshaw became the CEO of the Ketchikan Indian Community.

During the Biden Administration, Edenshaw was nominated by Joe Biden to serve as a member on the National Council on the Humanities, and she additionally serves. She is also a doctoral candidate at the University of Alaska Fairbanks. Her research concerns "Alaska Native Boarding School healing strategies."

== Personal life ==
Edenshaw is of Yup'ik and Iñupiaq descent, as well as Adopted into the Raven Thunderbird Clan of Old Masset, Haida Gwaii. She is a tribal citizen of the Native Village of Emmonak, Alaska.
