= Carlos Meneses Lambis =

Panamanian fugitive murderer and suspected serial killer

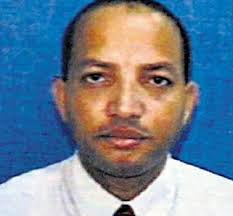
- Born: Carlos Rafael Meneses Lambis; 1965 (age 60–61); Panama
- Penalty: 46 months and 20 days, reduced to 30 months (non-murder charges)

Details
- Victims: 2–3
- Span of crimes: 2003–2004
- Country: Panama
- States: Panamá, Panamá Oeste

Carlos Rafael Meneses Lambis (born 1965) is a Panamanian criminal, murderer and accused serial killer. Charged with the murders of two women killed in 2003 and 2004, and suspected in the disappearance of his wife, Meneses has thus far avoided arrest and continues to be on the run. He is one of the country's most highly sought fugitives, and a warrant from Interpol has been issued for his arrest. In 1995, he was convicted of rape and blackmail and sentenced to 30 months imprisonment.

== Early life and crimes ==
Little is known about Meneses' early life, aside from the fact that he was born in Panama in 1965. Described as a withdrawn, cold and calculating man who is proficient at analyzing and scamming people, he graduated from high school from the José Antonio Remón Cantera School and then enrolled at the University of Panama's Law Faculty.

On August 3, 1995, Meneses stalked a woman he had previously dated to the Club Unión in Panama City. He noticed her and a male member of the club leaving a brothel, after which he followed her to her house and confronted her. He claimed that he had been hired as a private detective to expose her infidelity, threatening to tell her family and friends if she did not have sex with him and pay him $3,000. Frightened, the woman accepted, and only a day later, she went to a vacant house on Vía Tocumen, where Meneses sexually abused her. After this, the victim reported the crime to the police, who instructed her to stage another meeting with him the next day, where he was successfully apprehended. While searching through Meneses' car, officers found the clothes he had worn the day he had raped the woman, as well as her underwear.

Meneses was charged with rape, blackmail, theft and criminal misappropriation. He pleaded guilty to the theft and misappropriation charges and was convicted on the remaining two by the First Circuit Court, which ordered that he be sentenced to 46 months and 20 days imprisonment. Meneses then lodged an appeal to the Supreme Court of Justice, which reduced his sentence to 30 months and acquitted him of the criminal misappropriation charge. Meneses served out his sentence in full and was later released.

== Murders ==
On May 11, 2003, police officers patrolling the Miraflores lock found the body of 44-year-old prostitute Rafaela Ábrego Sánchez, which had been hidden in some bushes. It was determined that she had been killed with a single stab wound to her leg, which had evidently hit a femoral artery and had caused her to bleed to death. Witness statements from fellow prostitutes said that Meneses - who frequently used their services - had picked up Ábrego in a black 2002 Toyota 4Runner with license plate numbers 280603 and registered in Veraguas Province. After they found the vehicle, investigators requested that DNA testing be conducted in order to conclusively link him to the case, making this the first case in Panama's history in which such testing was used in a homicide investigation.

The results determined that small traces of blood found in the Toyota indeed belonged to Ábrego, allowing prosecutor Rolando Rodríguez to issue an arrest warrant for Meneses, with a special request that the warrant must not have an expiration date and that a criminal case can be started when the suspect is arrested. Later that day, it was determined that Meneses' girlfriend, María Luisa Caballero, had disappeared under mysterious circumstances in the vicinity of Vista Alegre. Although there was insufficient evidence to charge him with this case, Caballero's family claimed that he had verbally threatened her before and that she had planned to leave him.

On June 7, 2004, the decomposing body of a woman was found under the Bridge of the Americas near Panama City. She was quickly identified as 32-year-old domestic worker Leticia González Gaitán thanks to her employer, a dentist who recognized her porcelain-based dental work. González had gone missing just days prior when she left Panama City to travel to her home province of Veraguas, but never arrived. After interviewing a witness, it was established that González had been picked up by Meneses, who then drove away with her in his car. Due to this, a separate arrest warrant was issued for this murder by another prosecutor, Argentina Barrera Flores.

=== Status ===
A little over a month after the second warrant was issued, Panama's Minister of Government and Justice, Arnulfo Escalona, announced that three police units have been organized and dispatched to regions of the country where they had received tips about potential sightings of Meneses. In addition to this, a prize of $1,000 was offered to anybody who could provide information leading to his arrest.

Authorities believe that he might have been hiding in remote areas of Veraguas and Chiriquí for some time, possibly wearing a fake wig and mustache, and the prize for his arrest has since been raised to $5,000. He has been consistently ranked among the Top Ten Most Wanted criminals in Panama, and as of March 2025, Meneses remains a fugitive from justice.

== See also ==
- List of fugitives from justice who disappeared
