= Carlos Rafael (fishing) =

Portuguese-American fishing businessman

- Born: June 29, 1952 (age 73); Corvo, Azores, Portugal
- Criminal charge(s): Conspiracy, falsification of federal records, Lacey Act violations, bulk cash smuggling, tax evasion

Carlos Rafael (born June 29, 1952) is a Portuguese-American former commercial fishing magnate based in New Bedford, Massachusetts. He was the owner of Carlos Seafood Inc. and operated one of the largest commercial fishing fleets in the United States. In 2017, Rafael pleaded guilty to 28 federal counts including falsification of records, Lacey Act violations, bulk cash smuggling, and tax evasion after a federal investigation found he had systematically mislabeled protected fish species to circumvent federal catch quotas over a span of decades. He is widely referred to in media coverage as the Codfather.

== Background ==
Rafael was born on the island of Corvo in the Azores, Portugal, and immigrated to the United States in 1968, settling in New Bedford. He worked as a fish cutter on the New Bedford docks before founding Carlos Seafood, Inc. in the early 1980s. Carlos Seafood grew to encompass a processing facility, seafood dealership, and a fleet of approximately 40 fishing vessels operating under dozens of federal permits, making it one of the largest operations of its kind in the country.

Before his 2016 arrest, Rafael had prior federal convictions for tax evasion (1987, six months served) and for making false statements on fishing landing slips (2000, probation). He was acquitted of price fixing charges in 1994.

== Criminal case ==
New England's federal groundfish management system, implemented by NOAA in 2010, assigned fishing vessels species-specific annual catch limits and required accurate reporting of all landings. Rafael directed his bookkeeper to falsify trip and dealer reports submitted to NOAA, relabeling catch of quota-limited species such as Atlantic cod and flounder as haddock, which faced fewer restrictions. Federal prosecutors alleged that approximately 782,812 pounds of fish were misreported between 2012 and 2016. He also sold fish through off-the-books cash transactions and smuggled the proceeds to Portugal; Bristol County Sheriff's Deputy Antonio Freitas was convicted of smuggling $17,500 through airport security and depositing it in Rafael's Portuguese bank account.

In early 2016, IRS agents working alongside NOAA, the FBI, and other agencies approached Rafael posing as potential buyers of his business. During recorded meetings, Rafael described his operations in detail. He was arrested on February 26, 2016, and 13 vessels were seized. A 28-count indictment followed in May 2016 in a case prosecuted by Assistant U.S. Attorneys Andrew Lelling and David G. Tobin. Freitas and Rafael's bookkeeper, Debra Messier, were also charged; charges against Messier were later dropped.

Rafael pleaded guilty to all 28 counts on March 30, 2017. U.S. District Judge William G. Young sentenced him on September 26, 2017, to 46 months in prison, a $200,000 fine, and $108,929 in restitution. In 2019, Rafael reached a civil settlement with NOAA requiring him to pay a $3 million penalty, sell his entire fleet and all federal permits, and accept a lifetime ban from U.S. federal fisheries.

== See also ==
- Magnuson–Stevens Fishery Conservation and Management Act
- Lacey Act
- National Oceanic and Atmospheric Administration Fisheries Office of Law Enforcement
- Catch share
- Marine policy of the Obama administration
