= Northern Bering Sea Climate Resilience Area =

- Area: 112,300 square miles (291,000 km^{2})
- Established: December 9, 2016

The Northern Bering Sea Climate Resilience Area, encompassing 291,000 square kilometers, is a protected area within the Bering Sea, established by President Obama on December 9, 2016, by Executive Order 13754. It represents a hugely productive, high-latitude marine ecosystem and supports one of the largest seasonal marine mammal migrations in the world, including thousands of bowhead and beluga whales, hundreds of thousands of walruses and ice seals, and millions of migratory birds. Moreover, it is home to more than 40 tribes of coastal Yup’ik and Inupiaq peoples whose way of life has been linked with the marine environment for thousands of years.

== History ==
Native villages in the northern Bering Sea region of Alaska largely practice a subsistence-based lifestyle that is inextricably tied to the rich marine ecosystem of the Bering Sea. Warming ocean temperatures, Arctic sea ice decline, and increasing ship traffic all threaten the subsistence practices and food security of these communities. The coastal tribes along the northern Bering Sea and the Bering Strait have requested that the Federal Government of the United States of America take action to protect the health of the marine ecosystems of the Northern Bering Sea and Bering Strait while maintaining opportunities for sustainable fishing and sustainable economic development.

== Protection ==
=== Shipping ===
Coast Guard is nearing completion of a Port Access Route Study for the region, which is the first step in assessing the need for vessel traffic control measures and developing a set of recommendations. Any recommended international routing measures would be submitted to the International Maritime Organization which sets international rules for maritime commerce. Coast Guard is directed to give careful consideration to community recommendations regarding environmentally sensitive Areas to Be Avoided and to publish its initial findings by the end of 2016 and to move its conclusions to the International Maritime Organization for action by 2018.

=== Fishing ===
Additional to the already banned bottom trawling in the region to protect the sea floor, the executive order makes it a federal policy to support the continued prohibition on bottom trawling.

=== Oil and gas ===
Under the Outer Continental Shelf Lands Act, President Obama has withdrawn Norton Bay area and portions of the St. Matthew-Hall area from future oil and gas leasing to further protect the regional ecosystem and coastal communities. The total area withdrawn from leasing through the executive order is 40,300 square miles (104,000 km^{2}).

=== Consultation ===
The executive order establishes the Federal Task Force on the Northern Bering Sea Climate Resilience Area (Bering Task Force), under the Arctic Executive Steering Committee established by executive order 13689. The Bering Task Force will coordinate Federal activity and consider additional mechanisms to reduce impacts to subsistence and cultural activities within the Climate Resilience Area. The voice of Alaskan native tribes and the role of indigenous knowledge in decision-making within the region is elevated by mandating that the Task Force establish and engage in regular consultation with a Bering Intergovernmental Tribal Advisory Council, consisting primarily of tribal government representatives with government officials for coordination purposes.
