= King Island (Alaska) =

Island in the United States of America

Ugiuvak (Inupiaq)
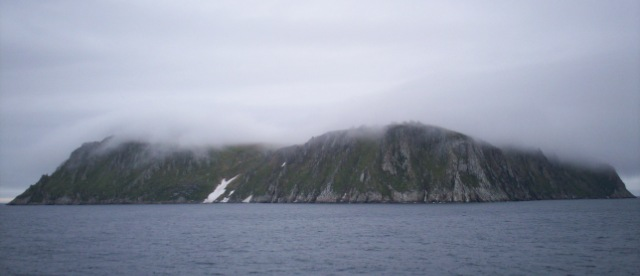
- King Island, Alaska. The large boulders on the top of the island are barely visible through the fog.

- Location in Alaska

Geography
- Location: Bering Sea
- Coordinates: 64°58′30″N 168°03′35″W
- Area: 2.5 sq mi (6.5 km^{2})
- Width: 1 mi (2 km)

Administration
- USA

Demographics
- Demonym: Ugiuvaŋmiut
- Population: 0 (2008)

King Island (Inupiaq: Ugiuvak; Russian: Остров Кинг, romanized: Ostrov King) (King's Island in early US sources) is a small island in the Bering Sea, west of Alaska. It is about 40 miles (64 km) south of Wales, Alaska. Although it has been used in the past as a winter home by the Iñupiat, it is currently uninhabited.

== Etymology ==
The Iñupiaq name for island is Ugiuvak, which roughly translates to "a place for winter". Its inhabitants called themselves Ugiuvaŋmiut, meaning residents of Ugiuvak. The island was given the English name "King Island" by Captain James Cook, the first European to sight the island, in 1778 for Lt. James King, a member of his party.

== History ==
The island was once the winter home of the Ugiuvaŋmiut, a group of Inupiat who lived there during the long winter. While on the island, they hunted seals and walruses. In the summer, they would journey via kayak to the mainland, near the location of present-day Nome. Residents hunted caribou and salmon and gathered berries and vegetables. Due to the limited daylight during the winter, the days were spent dancing in the "Qagri", or men's communal house. As an example, the month of December is known to the Ugiuvaŋmiut as Sauyatugvik or "the time of drumming".

The population of the island, while numbering in the hundreds beforehand, was crippled in the late 19th century by Russian and American whalers in the Bering Sea. In particular, the mass killing of walruses by whalers destroyed the food supply of the island and led to the death of over 200 Ugiuvaŋmiut in 1890. The whaling industry in Alaska declined soon after the Whaling disaster of 1871.

After the establishment of Nome in the early 20th century, the islanders began to sell walrus ivory carvings to residents of Nome and travelers during the summer. In 1929, the Bureau of Indian Affairs (BIA) established a school and a Catholic church on the island. By 1937 the island was home to 190 residents.

Rie Muñoz, a teacher at the BIA, arrived on King Island in 1951 and lived there for several years with her husband Juan.

=== Population decline ===
During WWII, many men from the island were drafted; many were killed during the war. Outbreaks of tuberculosis killed other residents, while others relocated to the mainland for access to healthcare.

In 1959, the BIA closed the island's school due to a suspected rockslide danger, forcibly relocating children to go to school on the Alaskan mainland. Families were effectively forced to move to the mainland with their children, and by 1966, all King Island residents had moved to mainland Alaska year-round.

Although the King Islanders have moved off the island, they have kept a distinct cultural identity. Some King Islanders still return to the island to gather subsistence foods, such as walrus and seal.

=== Recent history ===
The Alaska Native Claims Settlement Act established the King Island Native Corporation in 1990, with title to all of King Island and parts of Cape Woolley and Woolley Lagoon.

In 2003, Oregon State University professor Deanna Kingston, herself a descendant of the Ugiuvaŋmiut, received a grant from the National Science Foundation (NSF) to compare scientific and geographical knowledge with the islanders' traditional ecological knowledge. Using this research, she created an interactive website documenting the biological and cultural geography of the island.

In 2005 and 2006, the NSF funded a research project which brought a few King Island natives back to the island. Some participants had not been back to the island in 50 years.

== Geography ==
King Island is located about 40 miles (64 km) offshore, south of the village of Wales, Alaska and 85 miles northwest of Nome. The island is about 1 mile (1.6 km) wide with steep slopes on all sides. It is part of the Bering Sea unit of the Alaska Maritime National Wildlife Refuge.

== Demographics ==
Historical population
Census	Pop.	Note	%±
1880	100		—
1890	200		100.0%
1910	119		—
1920	137		15.1%
1930	170		24.1%
1940	208		22.4%
1960	66		—
1980	0		—
1990	0		—
U.S. Decennial Census

King Island first appeared on the 1880 U.S. Census as the unincorporated native eskimo village of "Ookivagamute." In 1890, it returned as Ukivok. It next appeared in 1910 as King Island and would continue to report until 1960, with the exception of 1950 when no figure was reported. It next reported as Ukivok again, classified as a native village (ANVSA) in 1980 and 1990, but with no residents.

== Gallery ==
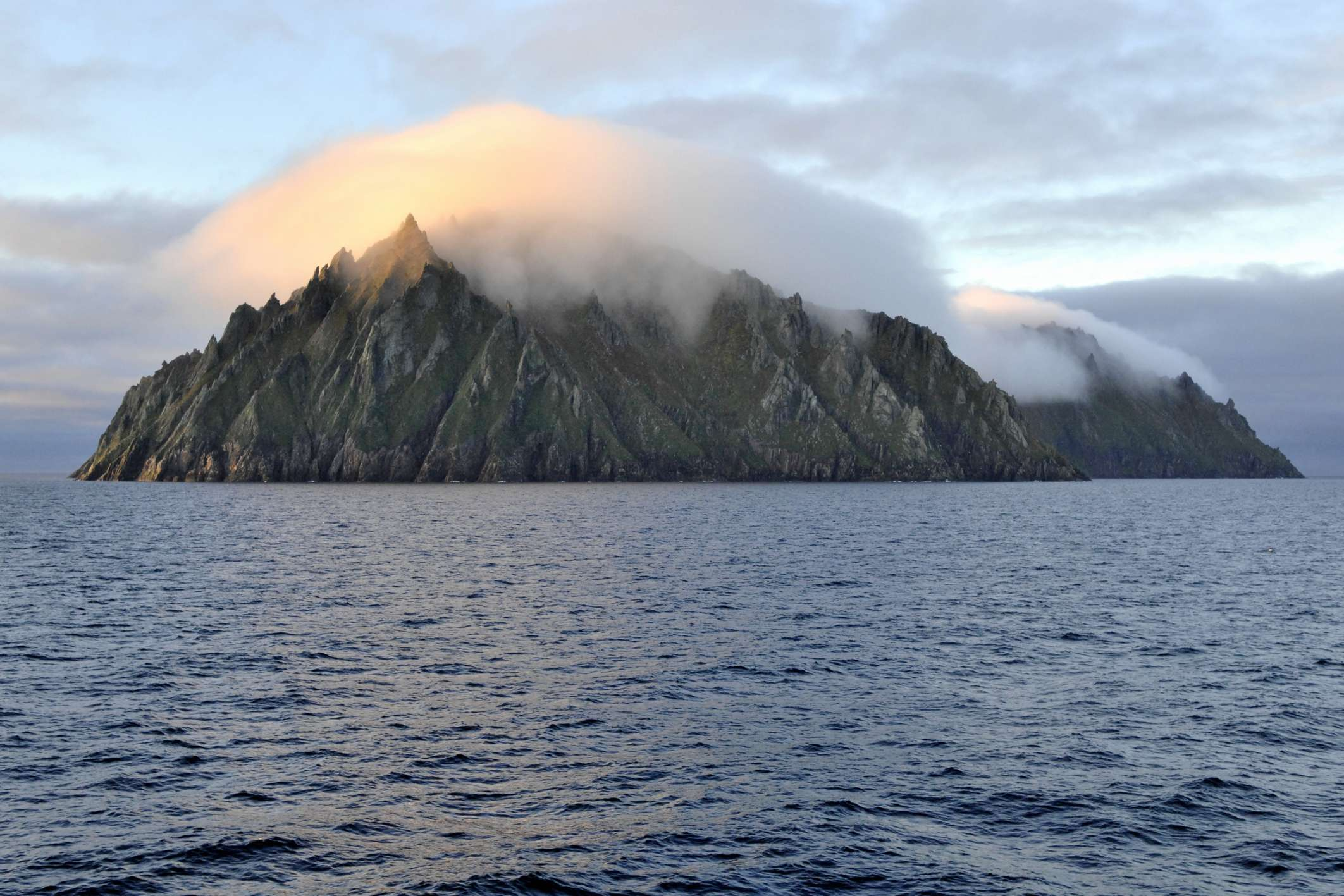
King Island

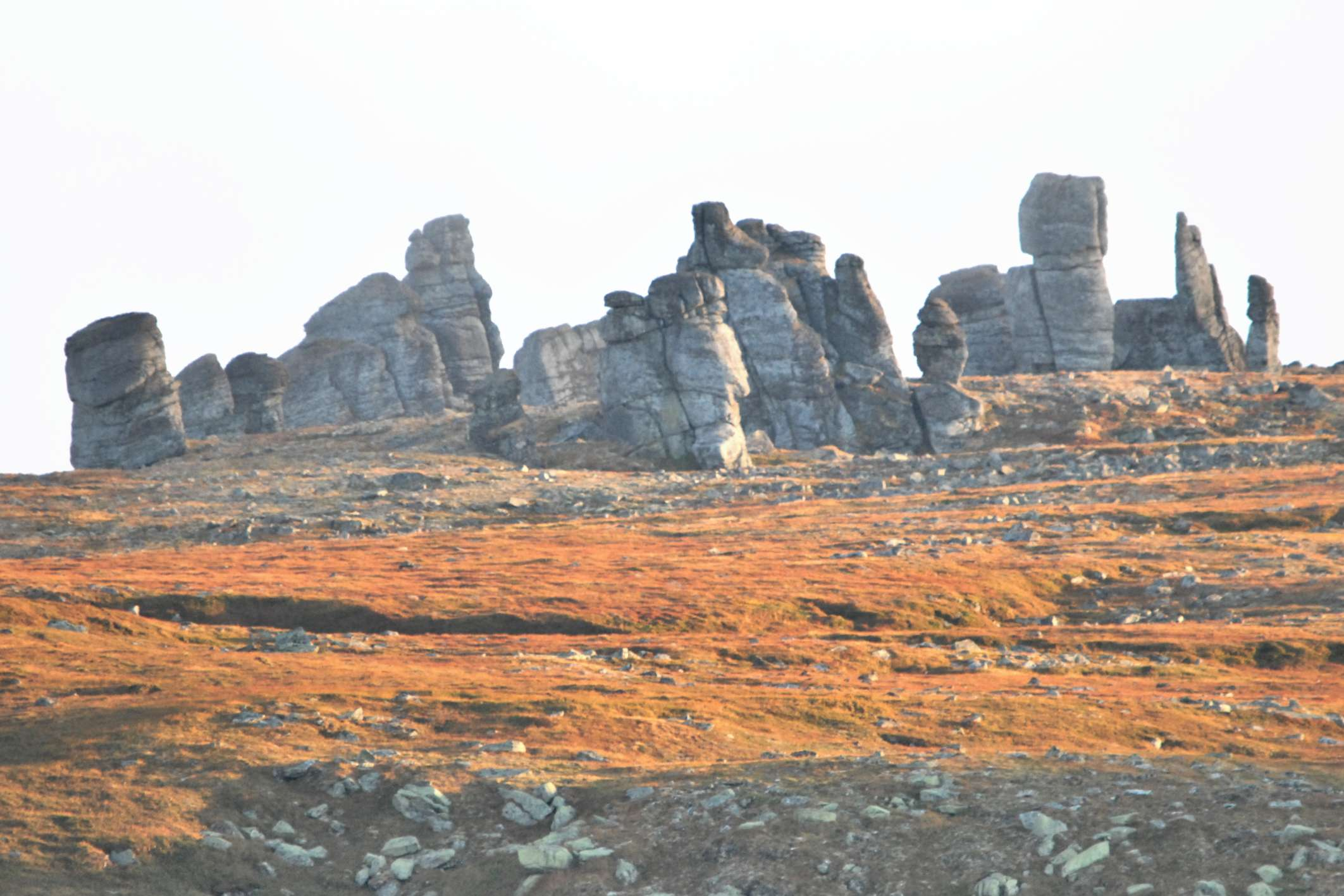
King Island: Rock formations that resemble ruins, on the saddle of the island

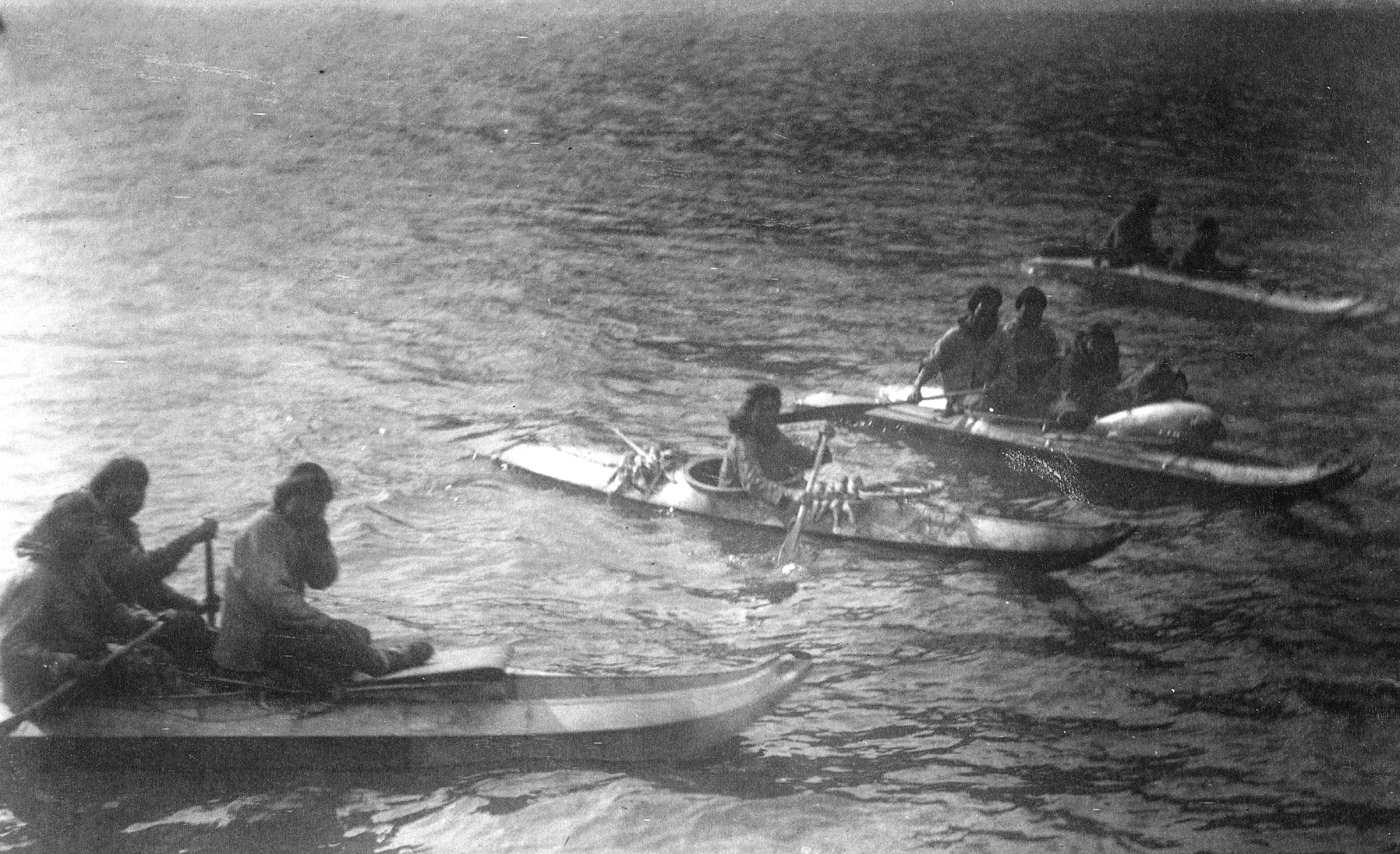
King Island residents in kayaks, about 1892. The kayaks are of the characteristic King Island style. Several carry more than one person or items on deck, and the paddlers are using single-blade paddles. Two-blade paddles were also used.

=== Stilt village ===
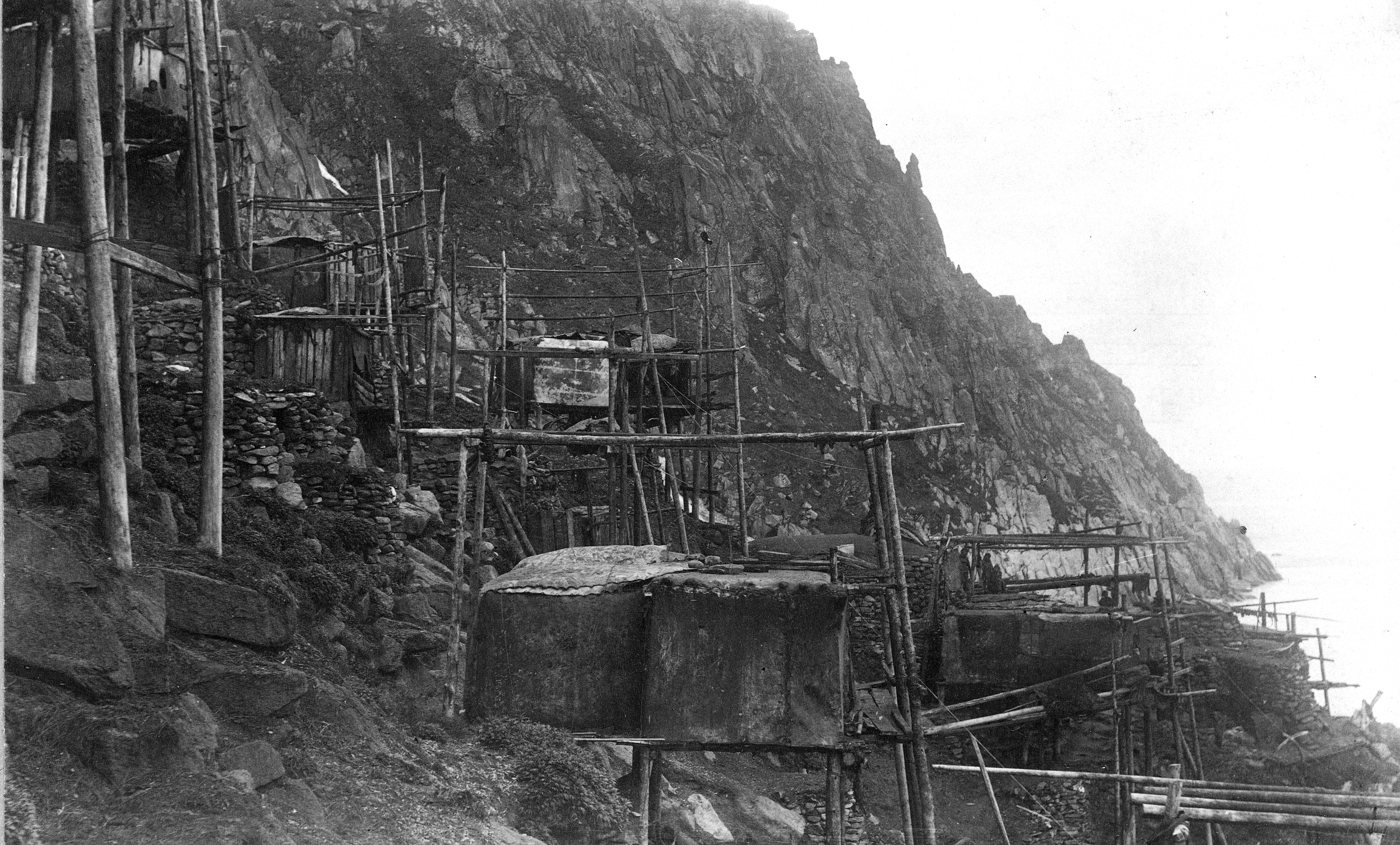
Ugiuvak about 1892. Walrus-hide summer houses and stone winter houses are visible.

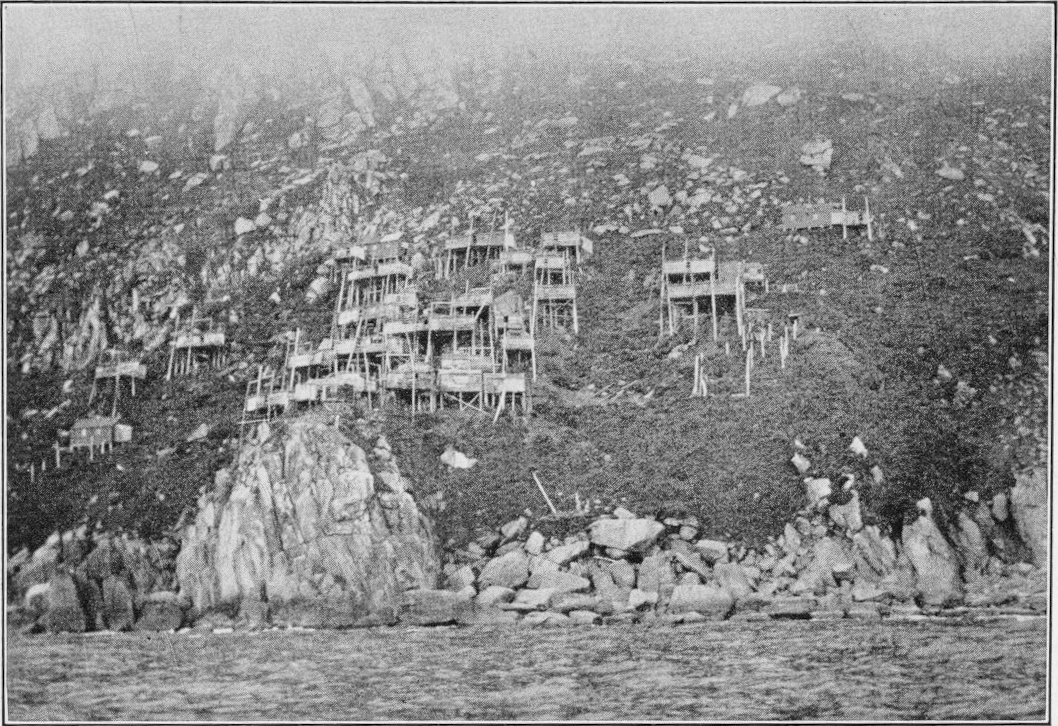
Ugiuvak photographed on the Fifth Thule Expedition, between 1921 and 1924.

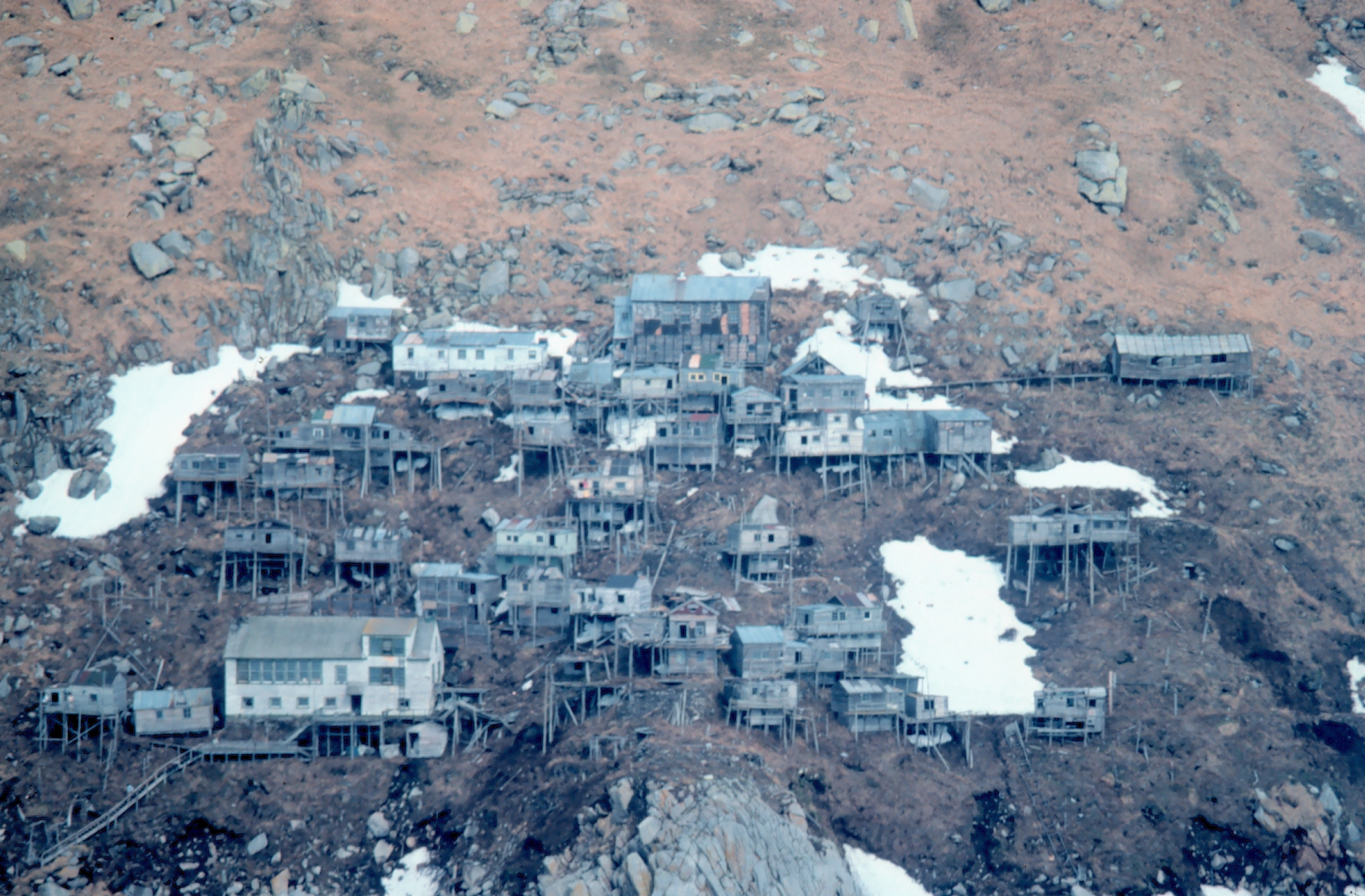
Abandoned stilt village, photographed 1978. The large white building near the bottom of the slope is the former Bureau of Indian Affairs school.

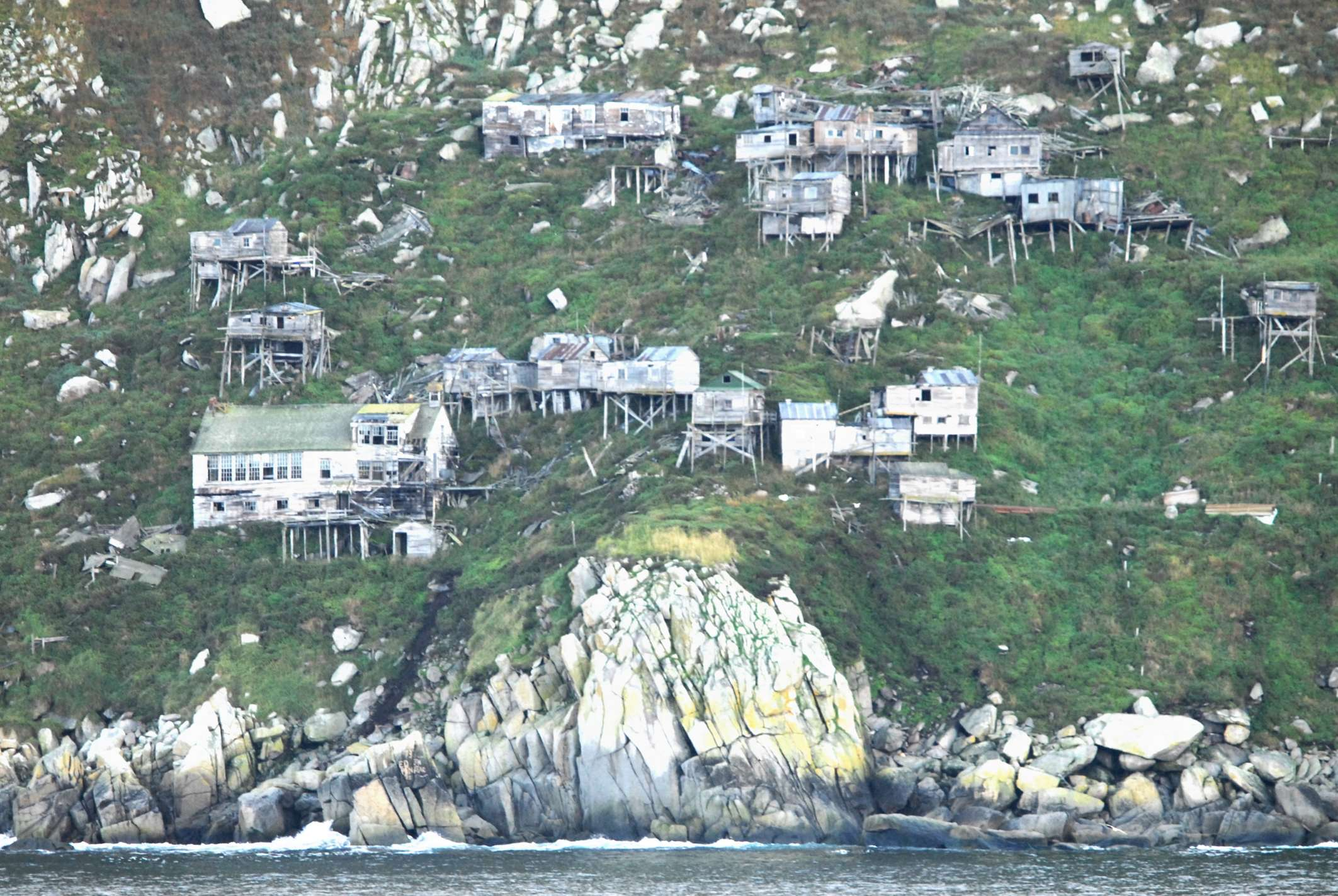
Ugiuvak in 2010

== Notable people ==
- Paul Tiulana (1921–1994), Iñupiaq artist and dancer born on the island.
- Dr. Iglahliq Suuqiina, an author of several books. Though born in Nome, Alaska, in 1950, he is the grandson of Chief Suuqiina of Okvok Island (now King Island). His mother was a full-blood Inuit. See: Okvok, An Elder's Story.
- Joan Kane, an author and poet descended from Ugiuvaŋmiut.

== See also ==
- King Island Native Community
