= Aryan Brotherhood =

Neo-Nazi prison gang and organized crime syndicate

- Founded: 1964; 62 years ago
- Founding location: San Quentin State Prison, California, United States
- Years active: 1964–present
- Territory: West Coast, Southwestern U.S., and throughout the federal prison system
- Ethnicity: White American
- Membership (est.): 50,000 (including validated members, prospects and associates)
- Activities: Murder, assault, drug trafficking, robbery, gambling, extortion, racketeering, arms trafficking, inmate prostitution, human trafficking, dog fighting
- Allies: Dirty White Boys; Gambino crime family; Hells Angels; Mexican Mafia; Nazi Lowriders; Public Enemy No. 1 Sureños; Vagos MC
- Rivals: Black Guerrilla Family; Dead Man Incorporated; Black P. Stones; Bloods; Crips; D.C. Blacks; Nuestra Familia
- Notable members: Clayton Fountain; Barry Mills; Thomas Silverstein

The Aryan Brotherhood (AB or The Brand) is a neo-Nazi prison gang and organized crime syndicate that is based in the United States and has an estimated 15,000–20,000 members both inside and outside prisons. The Southern Poverty Law Center (SPLC) has characterized it as "the nation's oldest major white supremacist prison gang and a national crime syndicate" while the Anti-Defamation League calls it the "oldest and most notorious racist prison gang in the United States".

The gang has focused on the economic activities which organized crime entities typically engage in, particularly drug trafficking, extortion, inmate prostitution, and murder-for-hire. The organization of its whites-only membership varies from prison to prison but it is generally hierarchical, headed by a twelve-man council which is topped by a three-man commission. The Aryan Brotherhood uses various terms, symbols, and images in order to identify itself, including shamrocks and swastikas. In order to join the Aryan Brotherhood, new members may swear a blood oath or take a pledge; acceptance into the Aryan Brotherhood is aided by a prospect's willingness to kill another inmate.

== History ==
Most prisons in the United States were racially segregated until the 1960s. As prisons began to desegregate, many inmates organized themselves into gangs along racial lines. The Aryan Brotherhood is believed to have been formed at San Quentin State Prison, but it may have been inspired by the Bluebird Gang. They decided to strike against the African-Americans who were forming their own militant group called the Black Guerrilla Family. In the early 1970s, the Aryan Brotherhood had a connection with Charles Manson and the Manson Family. Several members of the Manson Family were in prison at the time, and they attempted to join forces. However, the relationship did not last long as the Aryan Brotherhood took offense at the murder of pregnant actress Sharon Tate.

The Aryan Brotherhood grew quickly in the California prison system and eventually engaged in a race war in 1975 with the other prison gangs such as La Nuestra Familia, and Black Guerilla Family. As a result of the race war, California prison officials segregated the gangs to different prisons in California. When the Aryan Brotherhood was isolated in the Chino prison, they were able to continue to grow and develop their leadership hierarchy.

In 1981, Thomas Silverstein and Clayton Fountain were charged with the murder of a black inmate named Robert Chappelle in the United States Penitentiary, Marion, control unit. It was believed that Silverstein and Fountain strangled Chappelle in his cell. Silverstein and Fountain later killed Raymond Smith, a friend of Robert Chappelle. The two men stabbed Smith 67 times. Silverstein then started to plan killing a correctional officer. On October 22, 1983, gang members from the Aryan Brotherhood killed two correction officers at Marion. Silverstein killed an officer named Merle Clutts, stabbing him approximately 40 times. Several hours later, Fountain also killed an officer named Robert Hoffman. The tactics used were developed for a prior inmate murder; Silverstein used an improvised knife and handcuff key while being taken to the showers. He picked the lock, then attacked and killed Merle Clutts. Fountain used similar tactics to kill Robert Hoffman.

By the 1990s, the Aryan Brotherhood had shifted its focus away from killing for strictly racial reasons and focused on organized crime such as drug trafficking, prostitution, and sanctioned murders. They took on organized crime-level power inside much of the United States' prison system, where they eventually accumulated greater power and influence than the American Mafia. This situation was exemplified when, after being assaulted by an African-American inmate while incarcerated in Marion Federal Penitentiary in 1996, Gambino crime family boss John Gotti allegedly asked the Aryan Brotherhood to murder his attacker. Gotti's attacker was immediately transferred to protective custody and the planned retaliation was abandoned.

In April 1993, members of the Aryan Brotherhood along with members of the Black Muslims and other gangs in the Southern Ohio Correctional Facility initiated the Lucasville Prison Riot in Lucasville. The rioters took several officers hostage and killed nine inmates, then killed an officer. Their complaints included alleged abusive treatment and overcrowding, with Black Muslims also demanding an end to mandatory tuberculosis testing, which they said violated their faith.

=== Investigations and prosecutions ===
In late 2002, 29 leaders of the gang were simultaneously rounded up from prisons all over the country and brought to trial under the Racketeer Influenced and Corrupt Organizations (RICO) Act. The intention was to bring death sentences for at least 21 of them, in a manner similar to tactics used against organized crime. The case produced 30 convictions but none of the most powerful leaders received a death sentence. Sentencing occurred in March 2006 for three of the most powerful leaders of the gang, including Barry Mills and Tyler Bingham, who were indicted for numerous crimes, including murder, conspiracy, drug trafficking, and racketeering and for ordering killings and beatings from their cells. Bingham and Mills were convicted of murder and sent back to United States Penitentiary Administrative Maximum Facility Prison (ADX) in Florence, Colorado, escaping the death penalty. Bingham is serving a life sentence without parole. Mills, also sentenced to life without parole, died in ADX in 2018.

Prosecuting the gang has been difficult, because many members are already serving life sentences with no possibility of parole, so prosecutors were seeking the death penalty for 21 of those indicted but have dropped the death penalty on all but five defendants. By September 2006, the 19 indictees not eligible for the death penalty had pleaded guilty. The first of a series of trials involving four high-level members ended in convictions in July 2006.

On June 23, 2005, after a 20-month investigation, a federal strike force raided six houses in northeastern Ohio which belonged to members of the "Order of the Blood", a criminal organization which is controlled by the Aryan Brotherhood. 34 Aryan Brotherhood members or associates were arrested and warrants were issued for the arrests of ten more.

In June 2019, 16 members and associates of the Aryan Brotherhood were charged with numerous federal offenses following a multiyear investigation inside and outside of California’s prisons. Members and associates of the gang were charged with racketeering, murder, attempted murder and drug trafficking crimes. In April 2024, a federal jury found California State Prison Sacramento inmate Ronald "Renegade" Yandell, 61, guilty of murder in aid of racketeering; conspiracy to conduct the affairs of an enterprise through a pattern of racketeering activity; five counts of conspiracy to commit murder in aid of racketeering; two counts of conspiracy to distribute and possess with intent to distribute methamphetamine and heroin; five counts of distribution of heroin; and one count of distribution of methamphetamine. The same jury found inmate Danny Troxell, 71, guilty of conspiracy to conduct the affairs of an enterprise through a pattern of racketeering activity and conspiracy to commit murder in aid of racketeering. The jury found inmate Billy Sylvester, 55, guilty of murder in aid of racketeering; conspiracy to conduct the affairs of an enterprise through a pattern of racketeering activity; conspiracy to distribute and possess with intent to distribute methamphetamine and heroin; and distribution of methamphetamine. The three are already serving life sentences and await punishment for the most recent verdicts.

A 34-year-old man associated with the "Aryan Cowboy Brotherhood" was identified as the key suspect known as "Umbrella Man" who allegedly incited the looting and burning of the first building in the aftermath of the June 2020 George Floyd Protests in Minneapolis. As of late 2022, he has not been charged with any crime.

In November 2020, more than sixty individuals that were associated with the Aryan Brotherhood were arrested in a multi-agency operation that took place in California, Montana, and Nevada. Investigators saw evidence that Aryan Brotherhood members were operating outside of prisons and noticed connections between the gang and violent crimes, firearms trafficking, and drug trafficking. The government saw these offenses occurring on the West Coast, however, connections to the gang were made across the country, reaching as far as Alabama, all tied to the Aryan Brotherhood, eventually leading to the seizure of 80 pounds of methamphetamine, 5 pounds of heroin, and more than 25 firearms.

== Ideology and motivation ==
The initial motivation for the formation of the group in San Quentin in 1964 was self-protection against an existing black prison gang. The Southern Poverty Law Center (SPLC) has said that, although they clearly have a white supremacist ideology, the major motivation is money, and they have occasionally set aside racist views, such as by allying themselves with Latin American gangs, in order to make a profit.

The SPLC, which monitors hate groups and other extremists throughout the United States, has designated the Aryan Brotherhood as "...the nation's oldest major white supremacist prison gang and a national crime syndicate", and the "...largest and deadliest prison gang in the United States".

Daryl Johnson, leader of the Domestic Terrorist Analysis Team whose job it is to monitor the activity of right-wing militias and other domestic terrorist groups, said that white supremacist organizations in prisons are a "...radicalization threat", committing acts of violence inside prison, and then in the larger communities after release. Johnson named the Aryan Brotherhood, Aryan Brotherhood of Texas, and the Aryan Circle as examples of white supremacist prison-based gangs which are radicalization threats.

In an investigation in California prisons which ended in 1989, the FBI characterized the Brotherhood as a "...violent, white supremacist group", and a 2008 DHS intelligence conference in Newport, Rhode Island divided violent domestic extremism into three types, and concluded that white supremacist groups like Aryan Brotherhood remained a threat and a cause for concern.

== Operations and membership ==
Estimates of Aryan Brotherhood membership vary from 15,000 to 20,000 members in and out of prison. This number refers to the total of leaders/admin, validated members, prospects and associates who follow orders on the yard or in the streets. The actual core is far smaller than 20,000 as shown by recent indictments targeting leadership.

The Aryan Brotherhood has members inside federal and state prisons, and outside on the streets. All members are white, and are either in prison or have been in prison. Joining is difficult. New members are on probation for a year, must swear a blood oath for life, and must commit a violent act to join the Brotherhood, such as killing a rival inmate, assaulting an officer or murdering an African American or Hispanic prisoner. Members are inculcated with various reading materials smuggled into prisons published by Aryan Nations, Militia of Montana, and other groups, as well as Mein Kampf, The Art of War, and Machiavelli's The Prince. Early members liked the Western novels of Louis L'Amour, source of the organization's self-proclaimed "the Brand" moniker. Therefore, they perpetuated an admiration for the outlaw gunslingers of the American West. Members also have a fondness for medieval Vikings and the pirates of the Golden Age.

Criminal activities inside prison walls include male prostitution, gambling, extortion, and drug trafficking, primarily involving methamphetamine. Outside prison, the AB engages in every kind of criminal enterprise, "...including murder-for-hire, armed robbery, gun running, methamphetamine manufacturing, heroin sales, counterfeiting, and identity theft", according to the SPLC.

== Organization and affiliation ==
=== Organization ===
After its formation in California prisons in the mid-1960s, the Aryan Brotherhood had spread to most California prisons by 1975. After some of its leaders were sent to federal prisons, they took the opportunity to start organizing inside the federal prison system. This ended with the creation of two separate, but related organizations, the California Aryan Brotherhood, and the federal prison Aryan Brotherhood. As a former top leader said, "They're like two related but different crime families. They each have their [ruling] commission… but they're allies." By the late 1970s, these gangs had fewer than 100 members, but their membership grew rapidly as they absorbed other racist and skinhead groups; today, these gangs are estimated to have over 20,000 members in both the federal and state prison systems.

In its early days, the group had a one-man, one-vote system, but this broke down as a result of the group's rapid expansion, and it was replaced by the establishment of a hierarchical structure, headed by a 12-man council, and overseen by a three-member commission. The federal and state systems each had their own council and commission. Organization varies somewhat, from prison to prison. For example, in the Arizona prison system, members are known as "kindred" and organize into "families". A "council" controls the families. Kindred may recruit other members, known as "progeny", and serve as a mentor for the new recruits.

A sort of internal banking or accounting system was instituted, which allowed them to "tax" criminal activity on the streets, and collect 20% on the proceeds, money which is then laundered and controlled by the commission.

=== Affiliations, alliances and rivalries ===
The Aryan Brotherhood is affiliated with a network of smaller peckerwood gangs, such as the Nazi Lowriders and Public Enemy No. 1, and the national hate-based organization Aryan Nations. The group also has an alliance with the Mexican Mafia (La Eme), as the two are mutual enemies of Black Guerrilla Family. Other rival gangs include the Black P. Stones, Bloods, Crips, D.C. Blacks, and Nuestra Familia.

The Brotherhood has associated in criminal ventures with the Hells Angels. The gangs were also involved in a power struggle in the East Bay, which led to the killing of Hells Angels vice-president Michael O'Farrell on June 6, 1989.

In 1992, the gang established ties with American Mafia crime, via boss John Gotti, who was sentenced to prison and contacted the Aryan Brotherhood for protection while he was in prison. Gotti also organized a business partnership which operated on the outside between his group and the Brotherhood and as a result of this business partnership, the group's power greatly expanded on the streets.

The Aryan Brotherhood's communication and control has become so tight and efficient that they have been able to organize and direct major criminal enterprises on the outside, even from solitary confinement, much to the frustration of federal and state authorities.

== Symbolism and identification ==
The Aryan Brotherhood uses various symbols and images to identify members, and the organization, and spoken or written mottos and oaths to secure them.

=== Tattoos and other marks ===
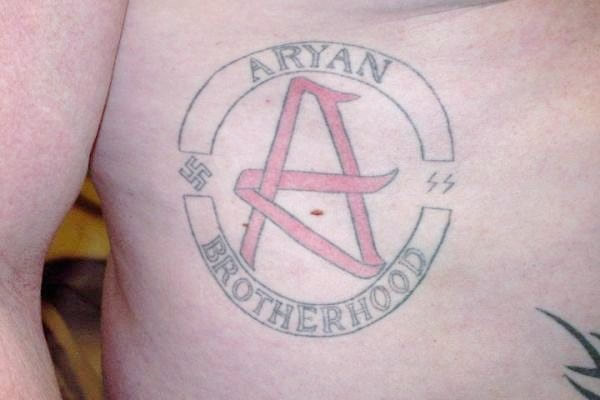
A member's tattoo

New members are branded with a tattoo, following the procedure in a prison novel popular among inmates. The image is a green shamrock (also called, "the rock"), the letters AB, or the number 666. "The brand" means the inmate belonged to Aryan Brotherhood.

Like most prison gangs, Aryan Brotherhood members mark themselves with distinctive tattoos. Designs commonly include the words "Aryan Brotherhood", "AB", "666", Nazi symbolism such as SS, sig runes, and swastikas, as well as shamrocks and Celtic iconography.

=== Mottos and pledges ===
Other means of identification of group membership are the "blood in, blood out" motto symbolizing life-long membership with no exit other than death, and "the pledge", an eight-line oath that each new member has to swear.

== Categorization and analysis ==
According to the FBI, as of 1992, the gang made up less than 1.0% of the prison population but was responsible for between 18–25% of murders in the federal prison system.

The United States Department of Homeland Security (DHS) released the Domestic Extremism Lexicon report in 2009 that defines different classifications of extremists. On the last entry of the 11-page report, it broke down the "white supremacist movement" into six categories: Neo-nazi, Ku Klux Klan, Christian Identity, racist skinhead, Nordic mysticism, and Aryan prison gangs.

An analysis by Slate describes the Aryan prison gang classification as "...further outside the white supremacy mainstream", and describes them as largely independent of other white supremacist groups, although the lines blurred as time went on. The report also refers to them as "more flexible" than other white supremacist groups since "...their criminal goals usually take precedence over ideology."

== Additional notable members ==
- David "David SS" Chalue, one of the three men charged with the kidnapping and slaying of David Glasser, Edward Frampton and Robert Chadwell in 2011.
- David Frank Jennings, murderer of Jewish Defense League coordinator Earl Krugel while the two were imprisoned at Federal Correctional Institution, Phoenix.
- David Clay Lind, affiliate of the infamous Wonderland Gang of drug dealers that received media attention following the Wonderland murders.
- Todd "Fox" Morgan, high-ranking AB member and drug lord who was fatally attacked by three inmates wielding improvised weapons at Salinas Valley State Prison in October of 2025.
- Paul "Cornfed" Schneider, the owner of the two Presa Canario dogs who attacked and killed Diane Whipple in 2001. Schneider, along with his roommate and fellow AB member Dale Bretches, had the intent of starting an illegal Presa Canario dog-fighting ring from prison.
- Robert Lee Willie, serial killer whose crimes, including the murders of three individuals, led to his execution by the state of Louisiana in 1984.
- John Stojetz, leader of the Aryan Brotherhood gang in Madison Correctional Institution (Ohio). He was convicted and sentenced to death for the racially-motivated murder of Damico Watkins, a 17-year-old African-American prisoner, in 1996. Five members of Stojetz's gang were convicted and sentenced to life for the killing.

== In popular culture ==
TV documentaries

- America's Deadliest Prison Gang
- Aryan Brotherhood (National Geographic)
- Gangland: "Aryan Brotherhood" (History Channel)
- Marked (History Channel, August 27, 2009)
- Outlaw Empires (1 episode, 2012)
- Ross Kemp on Gangs (2004–2008)

Films

- American History X (1998)
- American Me (1992)
- Animal Factory (2000)
- An Innocent Man (1989)
- Bad Boys: Ride or Die (2024)
- Bad Country (2014)
- Becky (2020)
- Big Stan (2007)
- Blood In Blood Out (1993)
- The Butterfly Effect (2004)
- Dead Man Walking (1995)
- The Death and Life of Bobby Z (2007)
- Death Race (2008)
- El Camino: A Breaking Bad Movie (2019)
- The Experiment (2010)
- Felon (2008)
- Fire with Fire (2012)
- Honour (2014)
- Higher Learning (1995)
- Inherent Vice (2014)
- Lockdown (2000)
- Miami Vice (2006)
- Once Fallen (2010)
- Ricochet (1991)
- Shot Caller (2017)
- Snitch (2013)
- Supremacy (2014)
- South Central (1992)
- Top Dog (1995)

TV series

- Agents of S.H.I.E.L.D. (season 4, episode 1: "The Ghost") (2016)
- American Gangs (2009)
- Animal Kingdom (TV series) (Season 6: 2022)
- Banshee (seasons 2 and later; 2014)
- Bad Blood (Season 1: 2017)
- Breaking Bad (Season 5: 2012–2013)
- Dexter (Season 3: 2008)
- Explorer (2010)
- Gangland Undercover (2015)
- Law & Order (2004)
- Monk (season 2, episode 16: "Mr. Monk Goes To Jail") (2004)
- Oz (1997–2003)
- The Punisher (2017-2019)
- Person of interest (season 2, episode 1: "The Contingency") (2012)
- Police Story (season 5, episode 5: "The Broken Badge") (1978)
- Prison Break (2005–2009)
- Raines (2007)
- Ray Donovan (season 3: 2015)
- Sons of Anarchy (2008, 2014)
- Truth Be Told (2019)
- Mayor of Kingstown (2021)

Other

- Hard Time (comic book; 2004–06)

== See also ==
- Aryan Brotherhood of Texas
- Aryan Circle
- Nazi Lowriders
- Universal Aryan Brotherhood
- Prison tattooing
- Public Enemy No. 1 (street gang)
- Peckerwood
- White power skinhead
- Far-right subcultures
- List of fascist movements
- List of fascist movements by country
- List of Ku Klux Klan organizations
- List of neo-Nazi organizations
- List of organizations designated by the Southern Poverty Law Center as hate groups
- List of white nationalist organizations
- Prison gangs in the United States
