= Barry Mills (Aryan Brotherhood) =

American gangster and murderer

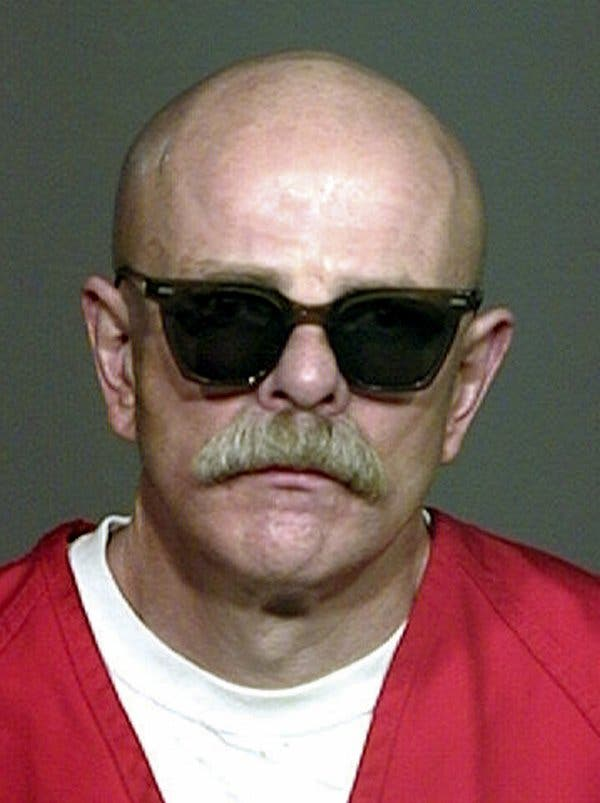
- Born: July 7, 1948; Windsor, California, U.S.
- Died: July 8, 2018 (aged 70); ADX Florence near Florence, Colorado, U.S.
- Other name: The Baron
- Status: Deceased
- Convictions: Murder, Murder in aid of Racketeering, Conspiracy to murder, Racketeering, Drug Trafficking and Robbery
- Penalty: Four consecutive life sentences without the possibility of parole

Details
- Victims: 4+ murdered (Note: Mills and several other Aryan Brotherhood members were indicted for numerous murders. Mills himself was convicted of committing at least 4 murders)
- Span of crimes: 1979–1997
- States: California, Georgia and Pennsylvania

Barry Byron Mills (July 7, 1948 – July 8, 2018) was an American gangster and leader of the Aryan Brotherhood (AB) prison gang. Nicknamed "The Baron", Mills was incarcerated in the California state prison system at a young age, where he rose within the AB organization during the 1970s and 80s.

== Biography ==
Baron Mills, from Windsor, California, was first incarcerated in 1967, and jailed for a year in a county lockup. He entered the California state prison system after an armed robbery in 1969, and was incarcerated from then on.

He became involved with the Aryan Brotherhood in San Quentin Prison, where the group originated in 1964. He was convicted of nearly beheading another inmate, John Marzloff, over a gambling debt at USP Atlanta in 1979.

According to a federal indictment, Mills was involved in the consolidation of the AB power structure in 1980, where he assumed a seat in a three-member "federal commission" for the gang. Along with Tyler Bingham, he expanded the operations of the AB in federal and state prisons, moving the group into narcotics dealing and racketeering.

In 1996, Barry Mills proposed that the Aryan Brotherhood absorb the prison gang known as the Dirty White Boys.

In 1997, Mills and his accomplice, Tyler Bingham, reportedly ordered their members to carry out a race war against a rival prison gang, the D.C. Blacks.

In March 2006, Charles Hartsell, a Las Vegas member, and leader of the Las Vegas section, along with three other leaders of the Aryan Brotherhood, including Bingham, were indicted for numerous crimes, including murder, conspiracy, drug trafficking, and racketeering. Barry Mills and Tyler Bingham were convicted of murder and sent back to ADX Florence near Florence, Colorado, after they were given life sentences without the possibility of parole. Federal prosecutors sought a death sentence for Mills and Bingham, but both were spared after jurors deadlocked on whether they should be executed. The two were convicted of murdering Arva Ray, Frank Joyner and Abdul Salaam, the latter two of whom were D.C. Blacks. Ray was killed at Federal Correctional Institution, Lompoc I in 1989 whereas Joyner and Salaam were killed at Federal Correctional Institution, Lewisburg in 1997. Fellow Aryan Brotherhood member Edgar Hevle was also convicted of committing the three murders and received a life sentence. A fourth Aryan member, Christopher Gibson, was convicted of conspiring with the other three members to commit the murders. The sentences for all four members were imposed in 2007.

Mills died on July 8, 2018, the day after his 70th birthday.

== See also ==
- Clayton Fountain
