= Syed Fahad Hashmi =

Syed Fahad Hashmi (born 1980) is a Pakistani American and U.S. citizen. He was arrested in London, England, on June 6, 2006, based on an indictment from the United States charging him with conspiracy to provide material support to Al-Qaeda. On April 27, 2010, Hashmi pleaded guilty to one count in Federal District Court in Manhattan. He was subsequently sentenced to 15 years in prison. Hashmi was being held at the federal supermax prison in Florence, Colorado. He was released July 19, 2019.

== Biography ==
=== Early life and education ===
Hashmi was born in Karachi, Pakistan, in 1980. He emigrated with his family to the United States when he was three years old. His family settled in Flushing, New York, where he was raised and attended school. He graduated from Robert F Wagner High School in 1998 and then attended SUNY Stony Brook. Hashmi eventually transferred to Brooklyn College, where he earned a bachelor's degree in political science in 2003. A devout Muslim, he proselytized for Islam and was a political activist on campus. In 2003 he enrolled at London Metropolitan University in England to pursue a master's degree in International Relations, which he received in 2006.

=== Arrest and terrorism charges ===
On June 6, 2006, he was arrested at Heathrow Airport based on an indictment from an American federal grand jury. The charges were for conspiring to send money and military gear to al Qaeda associates in Pakistan. They were for conspiracy because Hashmi did not provide the material support himself. Rather, Hashmi allowed an acquaintance from New York, Junaid Babar, to stay in his apartment for two weeks and that Babar brought military gear with him in a suitcase and later gave the gear to al Qaeda. The items being labeled as "military gear" were socks and rainproof ponchos. His arrest was based on the testimony of Babar, who was apprehended and then turned informant in a successful attempt to get a reduction in his own 70-year prison sentence.

He was housed as a Category A-high security prisoner at HM Prison Belmarsh while fighting extradition to the United States. In March 2007, the High Court of England and Wales ruled against him. He was then extradited to the United States in May 2007 and arraigned before District Judge Loretta A. Preska.

Hashmi was held for pre-trial detention in 23-hour solitary confinement under special administrative measures at Metropolitan Correction Center in Manhattan. By the time his trial date approached in April 2010, he had been held in isolation for nearly three years.

=== Guilty plea ===
On April 27, 2010, one day before his trial was to start, Hashmi pleaded guilty to a single count of conspiracy to provide material support to al-Qaeda in Federal District Court in Manhattan. He was asked by Judge Loretta A. Preska whether he was pleading "because you are in fact guilty" to which Hashmi replied, "Alhamdulillah, yes." Attorneys on both sides recommended a maximum prison term of 15 years. After the hearing one of Hashmi’s lawyers, David Ruhnke said that "[Hashmi] made the best deal that was available under the circumstances," adding that "[h]e stepped up and accepted responsibility. The government wanted to lock him up for the rest of his life. They will not succeed in that goal."
