= Thomas Silverstein =

American murderer (1952–2019)

Thomas Edward Silverstein
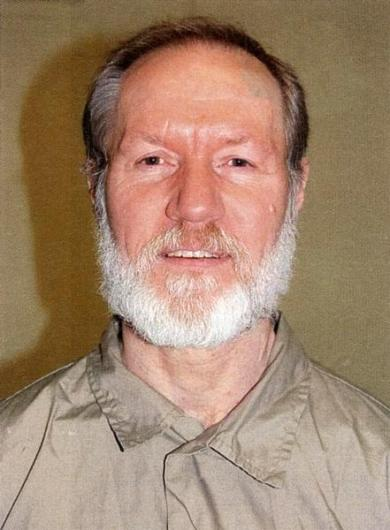
- Born: Thomas Edward Conway; February 4, 1952; Long Beach, California, U.S.
- Died: May 11, 2019 (aged 67); Lakewood, Colorado, U.S.
- Other names: Terrible Tom, Tommy
- Known for: Former leader of the Aryan Brotherhood
- Convictions: First degree murder (3 counts); Robbery
- Penalty: 3 consecutive life sentences without parole

Details
- Victims: 3–5
- Span of crimes: 1981–1983
- Country: United States
- State: Illinois
- Location: USP Marion

Thomas Edward Silverstein (born Thomas Edward Conway; February 4, 1952 – May 11, 2019) was an American criminal who spent the last 42 years of his life in prison after being convicted of three separate murders, with a fourth murder conviction being overturned and Silverstein being implicated in a fifth, while imprisoned for armed robbery. Silverstein spent the last 36 years of his life in solitary confinement for killing corrections officer Merle Clutts at the Marion Penitentiary in Illinois. Prison authorities described him as a brutal killer and a former leader of the Aryan Brotherhood prison gang. Silverstein maintained that the dehumanizing conditions inside the prison system contributed to the three murders he committed. He was the longest-held prisoner in solitary confinement within the Bureau of Prisons at the time of his death. Correctional officers refused to talk to Silverstein out of respect for Clutts.

== Early life ==
Silverstein was born in Long Beach, California, to Virginia Conway. Conway had divorced her first husband in 1952 while pregnant with Silverstein and married Thomas Conway, who Silverstein claimed was his biological father. Four years later, Virginia divorced Conway and married Sid Silverstein, who legally adopted her son.

Silverstein was timid, awkward, shy, and frequently bullied as a child in the middle-class neighborhood where the family lived, in part because his peers mistakenly believed he was Jewish. Virginia Silverstein demanded that her son fight back, telling the boy that if he ever came home again crying because he had been beaten up by a bully, she would be waiting to give him another beating. Silverstein states, "That's how my mom was. She stood her mud. If someone came at you with a bat, you got your bat and you both went at it." At age fourteen, Silverstein was sentenced to a California Youth Authority reformatory where, he said, his attitudes about violence were reinforced. "Anyone not willing to fight was abused."

In 1971, at age nineteen, Silverstein was sent to San Quentin Prison in California for armed robbery. Four years later, he was paroled, but he was arrested soon after along with his father, Thomas Conway, and his cousin, Gerald Hoff, for three armed robberies. Their take was less than $11,000 (equivalent to $87,000 in 2025). In 1977, Silverstein was sentenced to fifteen years for armed robbery, to be served at United States Penitentiary in Leavenworth, Kansas.

== Alleged murder at USP Leavenworth and murders at USP Marion ==
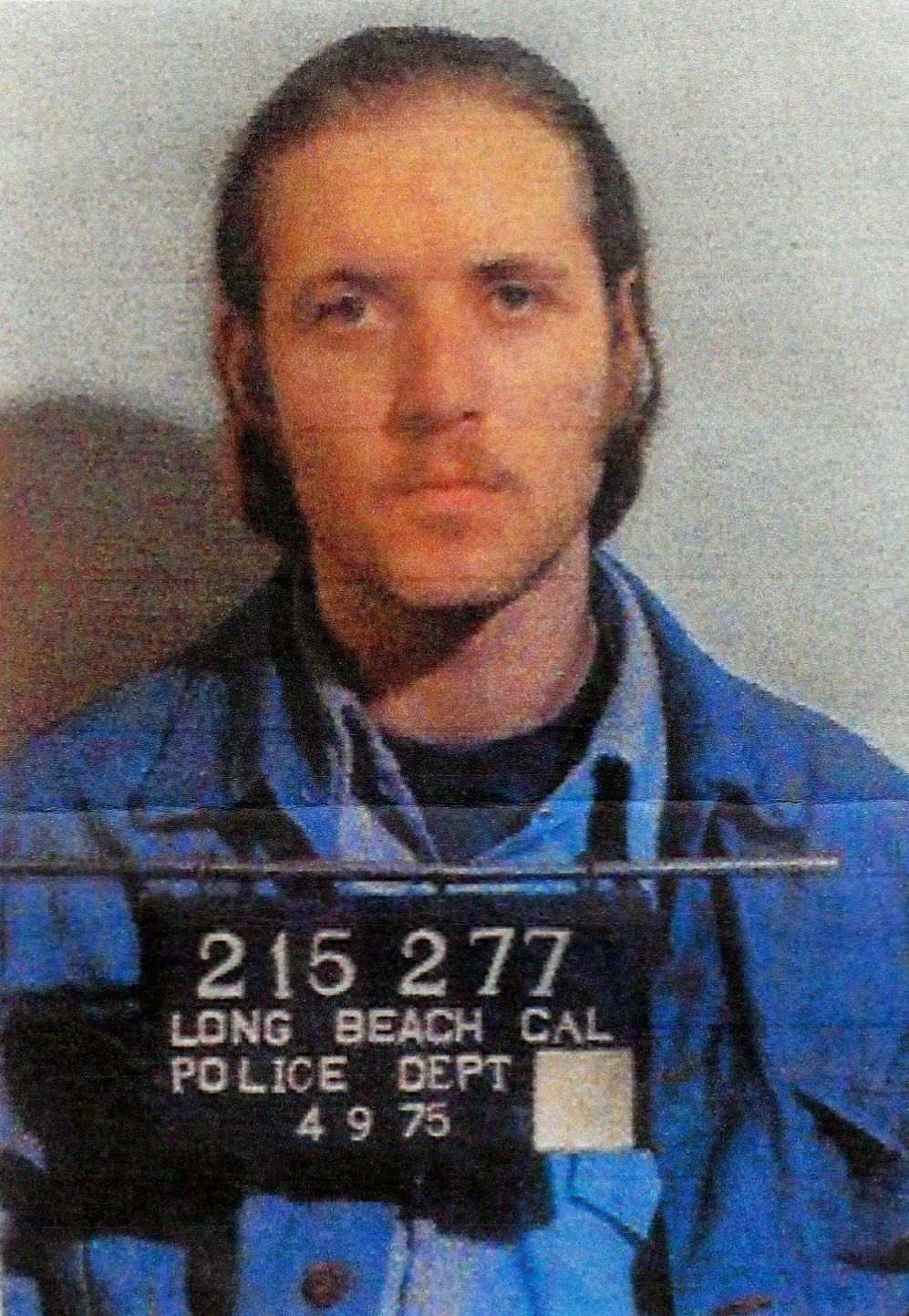
Silverstein in a police photograph taken in 1975 after an arrest for armed robbery

While at Leavenworth, Silverstein developed ties with the Aryan Brotherhood. In 1980, Silverstein was convicted of the murder of inmate Danny Atwell, who reportedly refused to serve as a mule for heroin being moved through the prison. He was sentenced to life and transferred to the United States Penitentiary in Marion, Illinois (USP Marion), which was then a high-security facility. The conviction was overturned in 1985 after it emerged that the jailhouse informants who had testified at his trial had perjured themselves on the stand.

At Marion, Silverstein was housed in the "Control Unit," a virtual solitary confinement regime reserved for extreme "management problems" (prisoners prone to assaultive and disruptive behavior) in the prison. He spent his time in solitary confinement with a constant ceiling light, ensuring uninterrupted camera surveillance. He was allowed only two phone calls per month and received his meals through a slot.

In 1981, Silverstein was accused of the murder of Robert Chappelle, a member of the D.C. Blacks prison gang who was serving a life sentence for the 1964 murder of Connecticut police officer Henry Jennings. Silverstein and fellow Aryan Brotherhood member Clayton Fountain were convicted and Silverstein received an additional life sentence. He maintained his innocence. While Silverstein was on trial for Chappelle's murder, the Bureau of Prisons transferred Raymond Lee "Cadillac" Smith, the national leader of the D.C. Blacks prison gang, from another prison into the control unit in Marion. From the moment Smith arrived in the control unit, prison logs show that he began trying to kill Silverstein. Silverstein stated:

I tried to tell Cadillac that I didn't kill Chappelle, but he didn't believe me and he bragged that he was going to kill me.... Everyone knew what was going on and no one did anything to keep us apart. The guards wanted one of us to kill the other.

On September 27, 1982, Silverstein and Fountain killed Smith with improvised weapons, stabbing him 67 times. After Smith was dead, they dragged his body up and down the catwalk in front of the cells, displaying it to other prisoners. Silverstein was convicted of first degree murder for killing Smith and received another life sentence.

=== Murder of Correction Officer Clutts ===
Correction Officer Merle Clutts

On October 22, 1983, Silverstein killed correction officer Merle Clutts at USP Marion. After being let out of his cell for a shower, Silverstein used a ruse to get Clutts to walk ahead of him and positioned himself between Clutts and other officers. He stopped outside the cell of another inmate, Randy Gometz. Gometz passed a homemade prison knife to Silverstein and unlocked Silverstein's handcuffs with a homemade key. Silverstein then attacked Clutts, stabbing him multiple times. Silverstein later claimed that he murdered Clutts in retaliation for Clutts' deliberately harassing him. Among other things, Clutts was accused of destroying paintings by Silverstein (Federal Bureau of Prisons policy is to confiscate artwork by inmates when it depicts murder).

A few hours later, Clayton Fountain used the same strategy to kill correction officer Robert Hoffmann. The murders of Hoffman, Clutts, and the other inmates outraged U.S. Attorney General William French Smith, who urged Congress to reinstate the federal death penalty. He said the inmates were killing "for sport" with effective impunity since they were already serving the maximum sentence allowed under federal law in the disciplinary section of what was then the most secure federal prison in the country.

These inmates were already serving life sentences in the disciplinary section of the most maximum security prison in the country. They knew there was nothing else the federal prison system could do to them. They knew they had nothing to lose.

USP Marion was subsequently placed on an indefinite lockdown, which ultimately lasted for 23 years. Following the murder of Clutts, Silverstein was transferred to the United States Penitentiary, Atlanta, where he was placed in solitary confinement. His security status was recorded as "no human contact". The events surrounding the murders of correction officers Clutts and Hoffmann inspired the design of the federal supermax prison, the United States Penitentiary, Florence: Administrative Maximum Facility (USP Florence ADMAX) in Colorado, which opened in 1994 and was built to house the most dangerous inmates in the federal prison system. Silverstein and Gometz were both held at ADX Florence. Fountain died in 2004 at the United States Medical Center for Federal Prisoners in Springfield, Missouri.

== Riot in Atlanta and transfer to Leavenworth ==
During the 1987 Atlanta Prison Riots, Cuban detainees at the Atlanta federal penitentiary released Silverstein from his isolation cell. They handed Silverstein over to the Federal Bureau of Investigation's Hostage Rescue Team one week later. Bureau of Prisons officials were reportedly afraid that Silverstein would begin killing correctional officers held hostage by the Cubans. Before the Cubans released Silverstein to Bureau of Prisons, the Cubans let Silverstein out of his isolation cell and Silverstein was able to roam freely about the prison. One of the prison guards being held hostage had a history of being considerate to Silverstein, such as asking him if his handcuffs were too tight when Silverstein needed to be procedurally cuffed. During the riot this guard was confronted by Silverstein and was ultimately spared by him. Bureau of Prisons negotiators were able to convince the Cuban riot leaders to hand over Silverstein as a gesture of good faith — a relatively easy decision for them, given that Silverstein's status was peripheral to the aims of the Cuban leaders during the riot.

Silverstein was subsequently moved back to Leavenworth, where he stayed for the next 18 years.

In 2005, when USP Leavenworth was downgraded to a medium-security facility, Silverstein was moved to ADX Florence, a supermax facility in Colorado. His earliest theoretical date of release was November 2, 2095.

== Allegations of torture and injustice ==
Silverstein claimed that the "no human contact" status is essentially a form of torture reserved for those who kill correctional officers. "When an inmate kills a guard, he must be punished", a Bureau of Prisons official told author Pete Earley.

"We can't execute Silverstein, so we have no choice but to make his life a living hell. Otherwise other inmates will kill guards, too. There has to be some supreme punishment. Every convict knows what Silverstein is going through. We want them to realize that if they cross the same line that he did, they will pay a heavy price."

Ted Sellers, an ex-convict who met Silverstein in prison, said he became a "legend" at Leavenworth. Sellers told BBC News Online, "he is not as bad as they portray. Sure, he is dangerous if they push him to the wall. But there were some dirty rotten guards at Marion […] They would purposely screw you around. You are dealing with a person locked up 23 hours a day. Of course, he's got a short fuse." In 2014, a federal court rejected Silverstein's claims that his treatment constituted cruel and unusual punishment, ruling that he was an extreme case where long-term solitary confinement could be justified.

Mr. Silverstein asks us to consider the fact that he has been in such confinement for more than thirty years without interruption, which he contends violates his Eighth Amendment right to be free from cruel and unusual punishment. Thirty years is indeed an extraordinary length of time to live in segregation, under any conditions. But even if we declined to apply the six-year statute of limitations, as he suggests, on grounds of a continuing violation or equitable tolling, we cannot look at those thirty years alone without considering the reasons for both his confinement and the continuation of his confinement in such isolation.

Up until 1988, Mr. Silverstein committed at least three brutal murders, was implicated in two others, assaulted three staff members, threatened a staff member, made an escape attempt by posing as a United States Marshal, and possessed weapons, including two hacksaw blades, handcuff keys, and two lock picks. Indeed, with respect to at least one of his murders, the Seventh Circuit stated his appeal afforded "a horrifying glimpse of the sordid and lethal world of modern prison gangs."

Irrespective of the length of his confinement, Mr. Silverstein's history with regard to both his violent conduct and leadership in the Aryan Brotherhood makes this a deeply atypical case and it is clear his segregated confinement is commensurate with ongoing prison security concerns.

== Death ==
Silverstein died on May 11, 2019, aged 67, at St. Anthony Hospital in Lakewood, Colorado, after spending 36 years in solitary confinement. He died due to complications from heart surgery. In an email shortly after, Norman Carlson, the federal prison director who issued the total lockdown order for him, conceded that his treatment in prison had been cruel. Without the death penalty being an option at the time, however, Carlson said there were no viable alternatives to dealing with Silverstein.

"I don't know what else could have been done to prevent further violence by a man who had nothing to lose."

== See also ==
- List of serial killers in the United States
