= Atlanta prison riots =

1987 prison riots at USP Atlanta

Atlanta prison riot
- Part of the Mariel boatlift
- Date: November 13–23, 1987
- Location: United States Penitentiary, Atlanta, Georgia
- Caused by: Announcement that Cuban citizens could be repatriated back to Cuba
- Methods: Hostage taking

Parties
Cuban detainees	United States Penitentiary, Atlanta staff, Federal Bureau of Prisons

Casualties
- Death: 1
- Injuries: ~250

The Atlanta prison riots were a series of prison riots that occurred at the U.S. Penitentiary in Atlanta, Georgia, United States in November 1987. The riot coincided with a similar riot at the Federal Detention Center in Oakdale, Louisiana.

== Cause ==
In the Mariel boatlift of 1980, over 100,000 Cubans migrated to Florida. By 1987, about 4,000 of these Cubans were incarcerated for lack of documentation or for committing crimes. On November 10, 1987, the U.S. State Department announced that Cuba had agreed to reinstate a 1984 accord that would permit the repatriation of up to 2,500 Cuban nationals. Consequently, 2,500 of the Cubans incarcerated after the Mariel boatlift would be deported. However, many of these Cubans preferred life in the United States, even behind bars, over life in Cuba. They rioted to express their anger over facing deportation, and they took hostages to try to negotiate a different fate.

A State Department spokesman indicated that the Federal Bureau of Prisons was not notified of the pending agreement due to concerns about premature disclosure of the agreement, so they had little time to prepare for the backlash.

== Riot ==
Three days after the announcement, the detainees seized control of the U.S. Penitentiary in Atlanta. Their principal demand was that they not be repatriated to Cuba. The riots lasted 11 days, involved more than 100 hostages, and burned down a substantial portion of the facility.

During the riot, 32 year-old Cuban inmate Jose Pena-Perez was killed by a correctional officer. According to prison warden Joseph Petrovsky, the officer shot the inmate to protect a fellow officer.

The Atlanta FBI, led by Weldon L. Kennedy, was called in to handle the negotiations and gather intel. After the hostage situation was identified, Special Operations soldiers from Fort Bragg, North Carolina, were sent to advise the law enforcement authorities.

Following negotiations, the majority of inmates voted to a surrender agreement on December 4, and the remaining hostages were released.

Of particular concern to the Federal Bureau of Prisons during the riots was the whereabouts of inmate Thomas Silverstein, who was serving a life sentence at USP Atlanta in an isolation cell, following his murder of Federal Prison Correctional Officer Merle E. Clutts, at USP Marion, in October 1983. The Cubans ultimately were able to drug Silverstein, who was loose among the prisoner population during the riots, and turn him over to the authorities while negotiations to end the riots were still ongoing.
