= Steven Lorenzo =

American convicted serial rapist and murderer (born 1959)

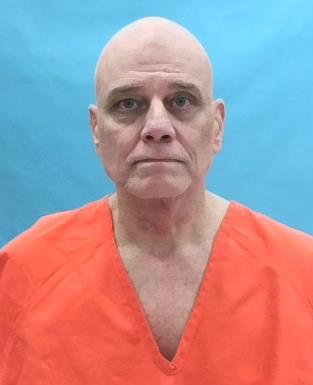
- Lorenzo’s mugshot
- Born: January 22, 1959 (age 67); Seminole Heights, Tampa, Florida, U.S.
- Convictions: Federal; Distributing drugs to commit crimes of violence (x9); Conspiracy to possess drugs with intent to distribute with intent to commit a crime of violence; Florida; First-degree murder (x2)
- Penalty: Federal; 200 years' imprisonment (2008); Florida; Death (2023)

Details
- Victims: 2 dead, 7 alive
- Date: 2000 (presumed) – 2003
- Location: Tampa, Florida
- Imprisoned at: Union Correctional Institution (state)

Steven J. Lorenzo (born January 22, 1959) is an American convicted serial rapist and murderer. In 2003, along with accomplice Scott Paul Schweickert, Lorenzo murdered Jason Galehouse and Michael Wachholtz in Tampa, Florida, after raping, drugging, and torturing both men. They were also responsible for raping and drugging seven other victims, all of whom were homosexual. After their arrests, Lorenzo and Schweickert were first prosecuted in federal court, where they were convicted of the rape and drugging charges involving all nine victims. Following the federal case, where Lorenzo received a 200-year sentence and Schweickert a 40-year sentence, the pair faced state murder charges. Ultimately, Schweickert was sentenced to life in prison in 2016, while Lorenzo was sentenced to death in 2023. Lorenzo is currently on death row awaiting his execution, which has yet to be scheduled.

== 2003 crime spree ==
=== Murders ===
From December 19 to December 20, 2003, Steven Lorenzo and his accomplice Scott Paul Schweickert (born August 10, 1965) committed two murders of men, both of whom were homosexual, in Tampa, Florida.

On the evening of December 19, 2003, Lorenzo and Schweickert encountered their first victim, 26-year-old Jason Galehouse, who went with friends to a Christmas party, and later went to another gay nightclub after briefly returning home. Subsequently, Galehouse told his friends to leave without him, and he followed both Schweickert and Lorenzo to the latter's house. However, that was the last time Galehouse was ever seen alive again, as he was killed by the pair after reaching Lorenzo's house. Reportedly, Galehouse was drugged by the two men with a drug named GHB, and as a result, he was raped and tortured before he was killed in an unspecified manner, and his body was dismembered and disposed of by both Lorenzo and Schweickert in trash bins all over the city. Galehouse's body was never found.

The next day, on December 20, 2003, 26-year-old Michael Wachholtz became the second victim to be killed by the pair. Similar to Galehouse, Wachholtz first met Lorenzo and Schweickert in a gay nightclub and was subsequently lured to Lorenzo's house. Wachholtz was also drugged with GHB and killed after the duo sexually assaulted him. Wachholtz, who was living with a friend at the time of his murder, was reported missing after he never returned home, and his family and friends conducted public efforts to seek his whereabouts. About 17 days after he was murdered, Wachholtz's highly decomposed body was found in a jeep abandoned at an apartment complex in Hillsborough County, Florida.

=== Rapes ===
Apart from the two murders, Lorenzo and Schweickert were involved in another seven rapes of homosexual men.

Based on court documents and media sources, the seven men, whose identities were kept anonymous, had testified that they lost consciousness after they were either served drinks by Lorenzo or lost track of the drinks they consumed. They also testified that they woke up only to find themselves naked and some of them remembered being tied up and raped. Despite the evidence of having raped the men, Lorenzo's lawyer would argue during his trial that the sexual acts were consensual. The prosecution's case revealed that prior to the serial rapes and murders, Lorenzo and Schweickert first met online and they bonded with each other over their sexual fantasies, which involved sex with men through torture and bondage.

One of the victims was a 29-year-old bartender who was living in Tampa at the time he was raped in February 2000. The unnamed victim stated he met Lorenzo at a bar, and, after reaching his house, was offered a drink by Lorenzo, after which he lost consciousness, only to wake up and find himself hog-tied with a "tourniquet noose" while Lorenzo was in the middle of sexually assaulting him. The man, who later moved to Massachusetts, was one of three surviving victims who came to court as a witness in Lorenzo's federal trial.

Out of the other two surviving victims who became trial witnesses, one was a foreign exchange student from Madrid, Spain, who studied at Saint Leo University in Dade City as of November 2001, the same month he encountered Lorenzo, who similarly invited him to his house, spiked his drink and also raped him. The student, who was then 19, testified that he remembered feeling an "electrical charge" in his legs. Another was a 25-year-old man, who, in March 2003, was reportedly bound with plastic ties and raped by Lorenzo for a prolonged period of at least three hours (during which he screamed and struggled), and the victim, who later moved to San Francisco after the incident, testified that after the rape, he passed out and later woke up naked while lying next to Lorenzo.

== Federal prosecution ==
In February 2005, Steven Lorenzo was arrested by the federal authorities for the rape cases he committed, and his offences were listed as federal due to him distributing drugs for the purpose of committing rapes. Scott Schweickert, Lorenzo's accomplice, was arrested for similar charges three months later in May 2005. Both men were subsequently linked to the murders of both Jason Galehouse and Michael Wachholtz.

Prior to his trial, Schweickert was initially ruled incompetent to stand trial in February 2006, but eight months later, he was re-evaluated and found competent to stand trial.

On November 10, 2005, Lorenzo was convicted of all ten federal charges, mainly nine counts of distributing drugs to commit rape and one count of conspiracy to commit these crimes. On January 27, 2006, U.S. District Judge Richard A. Lazzara sentenced Lorenzo to 200 years in prison for drugging and raping his nine victims. During sentencing, Judge Lazzara remarked that Lorenzo had created a "veritable chamber of horrors" in his house for luring, drugging and raping his victims and even killed two of them (Wachholtz and Galehouse).

On May 1, 2007, a federal jury convicted Schweickert of distributing drugs to facilitate a rape crime. This charge was related to the rape of one of the murder victims, Michael Wachholtz. Simultaneously, Schweickert was acquitted of another similar charge related to the rape of the other murder victim Jason Galehouse. During sentencing, U.S. District Judge Steven Douglas Merryday called the crimes "abominable, detestable and predatory", and added that had it not been due to the sentencing guidelines required in Schweickert's case, he would have ordered the defendant to be jailed for life. In the end, Schweickert was sentenced to 40 years in federal prison.

On September 17, 2008, Lorenzo, who was then incarcerated at the United States Penitentiary, Lee in Virginia, lost his appeal to a federal appellate court against his federal conviction and 200-year sentence.

== State murder charges and death penalty ==
Scott Schweickert federal prison mugshot

Apart from the federal charges they faced, both Scott Schweickert and Steven Lorenzo also faced state murder charges under Florida state jurisdiction, which warranted a potential sentence of life imprisonment or the death penalty if found guilty.

Both men were charged and tried separately between 2014 and 2023. Schweickert was first taken back to Florida to face state prosecution for the murders of Jason Galehouse and Michael Wachholtz, and the prosecution announced that they would seek the death penalty for Schweickert. Two years later, on June 9, 2016, Schweickert pleaded guilty to both counts of first-degree murder, a decision which allowed him to avoid a potential death sentence, and he was hence sentenced to life imprisonment. As a condition of his plea, Schweickert agreed to testify against Lorenzo in his upcoming state trial for murder. As of 2025, Schweickert, who returned to federal custody after his state murder trial, is currently incarcerated at the Federal Correctional Institution, Marion, and his tentative release date is June 20, 2038, although he is expected to return to Florida upon his release to serve his life sentence for the 2003 Tampa murders in a state prison.

On September 28, 2017, Lorenzo was extradited back to Florida and charged with the murders of both Galehouse and Wachholtz, and set to stand trial in Hillsborough County for both counts.

On November 2, 2017, Circuit Judge Mark Kiser ordered a competency hearing to determine if Lorenzo was mentally fit to stand trial for the 2003 Tampa murders. On December 5, 2017, it was ruled that Lorenzo was mentally competent to face trial for the killings.

On December 30, 2021, Lorenzo offered a plea of no contest, on the condition that the death penalty was taken off the table. He emphasized in his plea that he did not kill anyone but swore to not leave prison, and listed his arguments against the death penalty. In January 2022, Assistant State Attorney Justin Diaz stated that the prosecution would still seek the death penalty for Lorenzo and rejected any possible plea deal from Lorenzo, whose trial date was set in April 2022, and the prosecution stated that the families of Wachholtz and Galehouse wished for Lorenzo to be sentenced to death.

On December 2, 2022, Lorenzo pleaded guilty to both charges of murdering Jason Galehouse and Michael Wachholtz in the first degree. Lorenzo additionally stated in court that he wanted the death penalty, stating that he expected it even if he went ahead with a trial with a not-guilty plea.

On February 6, 2023, a sentencing trial was conducted for Lorenzo, who elected to be sentenced by the trial judge instead of a jury. Hillsborough State Attorney Susan Lopez, who led the prosecution, sought the death penalty for Lorenzo, stating it was the only appropriate punishment for him. Scott Schweickert appeared as a witness and testified about the murders in court during the same hearing. The mothers of Wachholtz and Galehouse appeared in court and asked the judge to sentence Lorenzo to death, stating that he deserved to die for killing their sons.

On February 24, 2023, Hillsborough Circuit Judge Christopher Sabella sentenced 64-year-old Steven Lorenzo to death for the murders of Wachholtz and Galehouse, 19 years and three months after he murdered the two victims.

== Death row and appeals ==
As of 2026, Steven Lorenzo is incarcerated on death row at the Union Correctional Institution.

On June 19, 2025, the Florida Supreme Court dismissed Lorenzo's direct appeal against his death sentence.

On September 17, 2025, Lorenzo expressed that he intended to waive his remaining rights to appeal and discharge his lawyers, maintaining that he wished to be executed for the murder offenses he committed.

On December 18, 2025, Hillsborough Circuit Judge Michelle Sisco granted Lorenzo's motion to give up his remaining appeals, after determining he was mentally competent to make this decision. As a result, Lorenzo is eligible for execution in early-2026.

== Aftermath ==
The murders of Michael Wachholtz and Jason Galehouse were known to be one of the most infamous murders to occur in Tampa, Florida.

== See also ==
- List of serial rapists
- Capital punishment in Florida
- List of death row inmates in the United States § Florida
- History of violence against LGBTQ people in the United States
