= Nazi Lowriders =

White supremacist gang

- Emblem of the Nazi Lowriders, based on the Reichsadler symbol
- Founded: 1970s
- Founding location: Preston Youth Correctional Facility, California, United States
- Years active: 1970s–present
- Territory: Primarily Southern California, with a smaller presence in numerous other U.S. states
- Ethnicity: White and Hispanic
- Membership (est.): Over 1,000
- Activities: Drug trafficking, extortion, armed robbery, assault, murder, identity fraud, money laundering
- Allies: Aryan Brotherhood; Hells Angels MC; Mexican Mafia; Mongols MC; Public Enemy No. 1; Sureños; Vagos MC

The Nazi Lowriders, also known as NLR or the Ride, are a neo-Nazi, white supremacist organized crime syndicate, and European-American prison and street gang in the United States. Primarily based in Southern California, the gang is allied with the larger Aryan Brotherhood and Mexican Mafia gangs, and fellow peckerwood gang Public Enemy No. 1. The Nazi Lowriders operate both in and outside of prison.

== History ==
The Nazi Lowriders originated as a skinhead gang in the California Youth Authority during the early-to-mid 1970s, and later established itself as a gang for young European-American inmates. It was created by members of the Aryan Brotherhood (AB), the leading White gang in the California prison system. In the late 1970s or early 1980s, Aryan Brotherhood leader John Stinson began recruiting skinheads incarcerated in the California Youth Authority at the Preston Youth Correctional Facility in Ione, and at the Youth Training School in Chino, to act as middlemen in the AB's criminal operations.

The gang did not come to the attention of law enforcement until the early 1990s, by which time authorities in the California Department of Corrections and Rehabilitation had begun suppressing the Aryan Brotherhood's activities. The Nazi Lowriders' position as middlemen for the Aryan Brotherhood, along with the crackdown on the AB, allowed the gang to supplant the Brotherhood as the most prominent European-American prison gang in California. While maintaining its presence in the prison system, the Nazi Lowriders also became a street gang, firstly in Southern California, and later in Central California and Northern California, during the late 1990s and early 2000s. Due to the gang's rapid expansion, links with other White power gangs, and highly organized operations, the Nazi Lowriders established themselves as a significant crime group on the West Coast.

As opposed to other European-American criminal gangs in California prisons, the NLR gained a reputation for being very violent. They are labeled as a prison gang by the California Department of Corrections. They are strong in numbers in such California communities as Oildale, Bakersfield, Lancaster, Inland Empire, Rosamond and Orange County. The "Nazi" part of their name is more a sign of a racist belief in White supremacy than anti-Semitism, while "Lowriders" is a play on the term used for Indigenous Hispanic-American gangs.

The gang eventually progressed from being muscle for the Aryan Brotherhood to a fast-growing gang in their own right. Unlike other White supremacist gangs in the US, they appear to be well organized and have developed links with other white organizations throughout the West Coast, including the Ku Klux Klan and Hells Angels. Paroled gang members have been known to move east to further spread the organization's reach.

On January 28, 1999, California prison officials recognized the Lowriders as a European-American prison gang. Consequently, in an attempt to disrupt the gang's criminal activities, inmates known to be members can now be subjected to removal from the general population, as well as other restrictive treatments. To this, the Lowriders have responded by striking an alliance with Public Enemy No. 1, another European-American disruptive group, which has since taken over the reins on California's White mainline prison population. Where Aryan Brotherhood and NLR have left off, PENI or Public Enemy No. 1 (Pronounced 'PEE NYE') plan to continue the 'key holding'.

== Organization and membership ==
In prison, the Nazi Lowriders have a three-tier hierarchy system consisting of senior members, junior members, and kids. The seniors typically lead the gang. For senior status, gang members must have been active for at least five years and been elected by at least three other senior members. Below them are juniors, who cannot themselves induct new members but can attempt to recruit potentials. Kids usually come from gangs like Public Enemy No.1, and the senior member who inducts them becomes their mentor. On the streets, the organization structure is not so clear, and appears to be more loosely connected.

Nazi Lowriders members are typically aged in their teens and early 20s.

Gang members may have tattoos and other body art depicting Swastikas and SS sigrunes, although members are not necessarily required to bear them. A tattoo of the letters NLR (the acronym for "Nazi Lowriders") commonly appears on members' stomachs, backs or necks. Other popular tattoos include "Nazi Low Riders" written in Old English script or the runic alphabet. The logo of the NLR is a skeletal eagle holding a Nazi swastika, with the letters of the group based on the Reichsadler symbol.

According to the SPLC, "Despite the NLR's avowed racism, Latino last names and Latina wives and girlfriends are OK, but, experts say, members are supposed to be at least half European-American.". In fact, much of the NLR's upper echelon is composed of Hispanic-Americans. Due to their extreme underground ties with other hardcore, racial organizations (such as Combat 18 or Blood and Honour), experts say, accepted Latino members must be only of Spanish descent, or be at least half Caucasian. All must show loyalty to the white race and subscribe to an ideology of hatred, especially against blacks and "race traitors".

The gang took its name from the phrase "lowrider", which is associated with Hispanic gangs, as an "act of one-upmanship".

Methamphetamine abuse is common among members of the group.

=== Ideology ===
While the Nazi Lowriders are primarily an organized crime entity, the gang's White power ideology is central to its identity. According to the Anti-Defamation League, the gang "champions its Whiteness especially when recruiting members from skinhead gangs and among new inmates, but it is primarily driven by criminal profit". The NLR's racist ideology has been the motivation for numerous violent crimes carried out by the gang.

=== Presence ===
The Nazi Lowriders are active primarily in Southern California, with a smaller presence in other U.S. states, including Arizona, Colorado, Florida, Illinois, Nevada and New Mexico. The gang's presence spread outside of California after members moved to other states in order to expand the NLR's criminal operations after being paroled from prison. The Nazi Lowriders first came to the attention of authorities as a street gang in Costa Mesa, California, and subsequently spread throughout Southern California, and later in Central California and Northern California. In Southern California, the gang is based in the Antelope Valley and in Orange County.

The Nazi Lowriders had 28 confirmed members in 1996, but by 2000, the Federal Bureau of Investigation (FBI) estimated that the gang had 1,500 members in the California prison system and 400 in San Bernardino, California. In 1999, authorities identified 100 members of the gang in Nevada.

== Criminal activity ==
The organization is involved in criminal activity both in and out of prison, notably in the production and distribution of methamphetamine, and has become a distributor of the drug in Southern California. The Nazi Lowiders also have connections with motorcycle gangs, including the Hells Angels, the Mongols, and the Vagos.

This gang is responsible for dozens of assaults, attempted murders, and murders around Southern California and is considered an extremely dangerous and violent gang.

=== Notable crimes ===
The Nazi Lowriders carried out two hate crimes against blacks in Lancaster, California in 1996. According to federal investigators, the street assaults were an attempt at "driving blacks out of the predominantly white community through a campaign of terror and violence". Gang members Eric Dillard and Danny Edward Williams used a baseball bat in the beating of Eric Miller outside a video rental store, on April 28, 1996. On July 8, 1996, Dillard, Williams and a juvenile who was not identified because of his age attacked and stabbed Marcus Cotton four times in the back. Williams was sentenced to 57 months' imprisonment, on June 1, 1998, and Dillard was sentenced to three years', on June 7, 1999. The third defendant was tried as a juvenile.

Two Nazi Lowriders members, Shaun Broderick and Christopher Crawford, allegedly attacked Nathaniel Harris, a Walmart employee, with a 20-ounce hammer in a store parking lot in Lancaster, in March 1999. The pair were arrested and charged with assault with a deadly weapon and civil rights violations.

In August 2001, Trevor David Thompson, a Nazi Lowrider and member of the World Church of the Creator from California, wounded Ashley McNeil, a 14-year old African American girl, in a drive-by shooting in Indianapolis. McNeil was targeted because of her race, according to police. In May 2002, Thompson was sentenced to 30 years in prison after pleading guilty to attempted murder.

=== Investigations and prosecutions ===
On March 29, 2001, NLR members Marcello Castellano and Scott Kuhn were arrested after Los Angeles County Sheriff's Department (LASD) deputies seized 73 firearms, including assault rifles, as well as hand grenades, body armor and a silencer, during raids on three locations in Los Angeles County. A sheriff's uniform and Nazi paraphernalia were also recovered.

A three-year investigation conducted by a task force headed by the FBI and the Ontario Police Department, with assistance from the Bureau of Alcohol, Tobacco and Firearms (ATF), the California Department of Corrections, the Orange County Sheriff's Department and the Costa Mesa Police Department, culminated with twelve members and associates of the Nazi Lowriders being charged in a 17-count indictment alleging extortion, conspiracy to distribute drugs in prison, witness tampering, robbery, attempted murder and murder, on February 13, 2002. All of those charged were already in custody at the time of the indictment. Michael Bridge, a high-level NLR member, and Robert Baltimore, a "soldier" in the gang, were charged with the murder of an inmate in 1996. All twelve defendants pleaded guilty to federal racketeering charges, including a senior member of the gang who was sentenced to nearly 23 years in federal prison in 2003.

== In popular culture ==
- In the 2017 crime film Shot Caller, Jacob "Money" Harlon briefly has a cellmate named Ripper (played by Keith Jardine) who is a member of the Nazi Lowriders, sporting an "NLR" tattoo across his forehead.

== See also ==
- List of California street gangs
