= Public Enemy No. 1 (gang) =

White supremacist street and prison gang

- Founded: 1986; 40 years ago
- Founding location: Long Beach, California, United States
- Years active: 1986–present
- Territory: Active primarily in Orange County and the Inland Empire, with a smaller presence in San Diego and Los Angeles counties
- Ethnicity: White
- Membership (est.): 400–500
- Activities: Drug trafficking, murder, assault, auto theft, burglary and property crime
- Allies: Aryan Brotherhood; Nazi Lowriders

Public Enemy No. 1 (abbreviated as PEN1; pronounced /ˈpiːnaɪ/), also known as PENI Death Squad (or PDS), is a white power skinhead prison and street gang formed in Long Beach, California and now based in Orange County, California. In 2004, the California Department of Justice described PEN1 as "one of the most powerful and fastest-growing gangs inside and outside prison", and reported it had about 200 members statewide. The gang's main activities include identity theft, credit card fraud, and methamphetamine sales.

== History ==
The Public Enemy No. 1 gang emerged from the hardcore punk scene in Long Beach, California during the 1980s. By the 1990s, however, PEN1's base of operations was in Orange County where the gang began recruiting white suburban adolescents and became involved in methamphetamine trafficking and identity theft. The gang also formed ties with the Aryan Brotherhood and the Nazi Lowriders in the prison system.

One of the gang's founders, Donald "Popeye" Mazza, became a made member of the Aryan Brotherhood. Another founding member, Devlin "Gazoo" Stringfellow, was stabbed to death by two other inmates at California State Prison, Sacramento on January 10, 2018. In June 2022, Donald "Popeye" Mazza pleaded guilty to racketeering and conspiracy charges in federal court.

== Symbology and identification ==
The gang uses the numeric symbol "737" to indicate association with the gang. The numbers correspond to the letters P, D, and S on a telephone keypad. The initials stand for PENI Death Squad, another name for the group.

Members often mark themselves with tattoos of different acronyms for the gang. Designs commonly include the words "PENI", "PDS" or the numbers "737", and sometimes in the form of runes, such as "ᛈᛖᚾᛁ" (PENI) or "ᛈᛞᛋ" (PDS), from Germanic runic alphabets.

== Criminal activity ==
Public Enemy No. 1 is heavily involved in identity theft, which is not a crime often associated with street gangs; most of the income from this is allegedly used to finance methamphetamine sale and other operations. Originally, the gang did this by raiding mailboxes and trash cans for personal information, but later used contacts inside of banks, mortgage companies and state motor vehicle departments in order to gain access to credit profiles. This has led to law enforcement officials requesting that their personal information be removed so that it can't be used by gang members to identify home addresses of police officers. Additionally, PEN1 is involved in drug trafficking, murder, assault, auto theft, burglary and property crime.

=== Investigations and prosecutions ===
On December 16, 2010, fifty members of PEN1, the Aryan Brotherhood, the Nazi Lowriders and three other white supremacist gangs were arrested in Orange County on various federal charges, including criminal fraud and illegal firearms and narcotics sales, as a result of Operation Stormfront, a joint investigation by the Orange County Sheriff's Department and the Bureau of Alcohol, Tobacco, Firearms and Explosives (ATF).

On January 1st, 2024, 57 some members of Public Enemy No. 1 were arrested after approximately 300 law enforcement officers from about 25 agencies, including the Federal Bureau of Investigation (FBI) and U.S. Marshals Service, carried out raids at 75 locations in southern California. Two handguns, a shotgun, a rifle and small amounts of drugs were also seized. The arrests were made after authorities discovered the names of an Orange County prosecutor and five police officers on a PEN1 hitlist the month before.

== In popular culture and media ==
- The gang is featured in the TV documentary series Gangland, season 6, Episode 14: "Public Enemy #1".
- In the crime-thriller feature film Shot Caller (2017), stockbroker and family man Jacob Harlon (played by Nikolaj Coster-Waldau) causes a fatal DUI accident and is sentenced to prison, where survival requires him to get mixed in gang life and associate with PENI gang members, then joining the Aryan Brotherhood through his connection to them.
