= Validation (gang membership) =

Being legally identified as a gang member in the United States

Validation is a legal process in the United States in which criminal justice authorities (prison officials, parole officers, police officers, or prosecutors) designate a person as a member of a gang. Once a person is validated as a gang member, the person is subject to increased sentences, harsher punishments (such as solitary confinement), and more restrictive parole rules.

To validate a person as a gang member, officials generally must provide evidence of several factors, such as tattoos, photographs, admissions, and clothing. The list of criteria for the state of California is found in California Code of Regulations Title 15, Article 10, 3375.3 and 3378.2.

The legal requirements for validating a person are much lower than those for convicting a person of a crime.

== Film and television ==
In the 2017 film Shot Caller, the main character, Jacob Harlon, played by Nikolaj Coster-Waldau, is validated by law enforcement as a gang member in one of the final scenes.
