= Mohamed Yousry =

American interpreter and translator

Mohamed Yousry is an American interpreter and translator who was appointed by the court to assist in the trial of Sheikh Omar Abdel Rahman, the blind Egyptian cleric who was convicted in 1996 of plotting terrorist attacks against various sites in the New York City area. On February 10, 2005, Yousry was indicted in the United States District Court, Southern District of New York, along with attorney Lynne Stewart and Ahmed Abdel Sattar, of conspiring to provide, and providing material support to terrorism and conspiring to defraud the U.S. government, and was convicted. Yousry was originally scheduled to be sentenced in September 2006, but he was sentenced on October 16, 2006, to one year and eight months.

Yousry translated a letter from Sheikh Omar Abdel Rahman that Stewart later released to a reporter. Abdel Rahman was under special administrative measures, which attorney Stewart violated by releasing this letter to the public. Although these press reports state that there is no question that Stewart violated these special administrative measures, whether Yousry did so is much less clear.

The American Translators Association and the National Association of Judiciary Interpreters and Translators (NAJIT) issued a joint statement about this case, which took a neutral stand about Yousry's guilt or innocence. This statement and its position have been the object of criticism by some members of the translation and interpreting profession. NAJIT later responded to these criticisms with a two-page letter detailing their broad reasons for failing to support Yousry, as well as listing specific examples of where they felt he deviated from just being a translator.

His conviction was later affirmed and he began serving his sentence in November 2009.

Yousry was released on April 29, 2011.
