= D.C. Blacks =

African-American prison gang

The D.C. Blacks is an African-American prison gang in the United States whose members are from Washington D.C. They are allied with the Black Guerrilla Family and some other black prison gangs.

The Aryan Brotherhood is one of their main rivals. Although the D.C. Blacks are one of the largest prison gangs within penitentiaries, they are small compared to the gangs outside of the prison system, such as the Bloods and the Crips.

== History ==
The District of Columbia is a federal district and not a state. As a result of this, there is no statewide prison system or even a facility within D.C to place felons after sentencing as is the case in the 50 states. Since D.C is a federal district, violators serving more than one year for offenses must be transferred from the D.C custody into Federal BOP custody to serve out the sentence in one of the federal corrections facilities. The number and concentration of these inmates into various systems, as well as the relative concentration of high crime areas in DC and the resulting familiarity of those inmates to one another has, over the years, created a de facto prison gang. Though referred to as DC Blacks for purposes of identifying the demographic, the actual inmates from D.C that band together, in many cases do not identify themselves as that. In most cases it is simply association through residency and mutual defense and resource sharing between these inmates in the course of their prison experience.

=== Origins ===
The D.C. Blacks prison gang is said to have originated in the late 1960s or the early 1970s. From being in prison, the D.C. Blacks became enemies with another prison gang called the Aryan Brotherhood, which is a group consisting of only convicted white men. The race wars against the D.C. Blacks raged across the federal prison system in the early 1980s and again in the 1990s when two of the high-ranking officers within the D.C. Blacks were stabbed and killed at the United States Penitentiary in Lewisburg, Pennsylvania by Aryan Brotherhood members. The race war in the federal system between the Aryan Brotherhood and the D.C. Blacks started on November 22, 1981, when a member of the Aryan Brotherhood, Thomas Silverstein, murdered a member of the D.C. Blacks, Robert M. Chappelle. An FBI investigation was sparked when Chappelle's body was found dead in his cell at the United States Penitentiary in Marion, Illinois. The race war continued when Silverstein killed the national leader of the D.C. Blacks, Raymond "Cadillac" Smith, on September 27, 1982. The violent campaign against the D.C. Blacks was at the center of the government's 2002 indictment against the Aryan Brotherhood when one of the leaders from the Aryan Brotherhood allegedly ordered the 1997 killing of two D.C. Blacks at Lewisburg with an invisible ink message written in urine. This message was sent to Lewisburg to warn their other members that the D.C. Blacks called hits on two of their members. Messages began to be sent back and forth between the two penitentiaries calling hits on both gangs.

Individuals from both the D.C. Blacks and the Aryan Brotherhood have testified in court, giving the public a general idea of what life at USP Marion looked like.
