= Shot Caller (film) =

2017 film directed by Ric Roman Waugh

- Theatrical release poster
- Directed by: Ric Roman Waugh
- Written by: Ric Roman Waugh
- Produced by: Michel Litvak; Gary Michael Walters; Jonathan King; Ric Roman Waugh
- Starring: Nikolaj Coster-Waldau; Omari Hardwick; Lake Bell; Jon Bernthal; Emory Cohen; Jeffrey Donovan; Evan Jones; Benjamin Bratt; Holt McCallany; Juan Pablo Raba
- Cinematography: Dana Gonzales
- Edited by: Michelle Tesoro
- Music by: Antônio Pinto
- Production companies: Bold Films; Participant Media
- Distributed by: Saban Films
- Release dates: June 16, 2017 (LA Film Fest); August 18, 2017 (United States)
- Running time: 121 minutes
- Country: United States
- Language: English
- Box office: $3.4 million

Shot Caller is a 2017 American crime thriller film written and directed by Ric Roman Waugh. The film chronicles the transformation of a well-to-do family man, played by Nikolaj Coster-Waldau, into a hardened prison gangster, which he undergoes to survive California's penal system after he is incarcerated for his role in a deadly DUI car accident. The film also stars Omari Hardwick, Lake Bell, Jon Bernthal, Emory Cohen, Jeffrey Donovan, Evan Jones, Benjamin Bratt, and Holt McCallany.

It premiered at the Los Angeles Film Festival on June 16, 2017. The film was released on July 20, 2017, through DirecTV Cinema and theatrically on August 18, 2017, by Saban Films.

== Plot ==
Jacob Harlon is a successful stockbroker living with his wife, Katherine, and son Joshua, in California. One night, while driving his wife and two friends home after an evening out, having dinner and drinking wine, he causes a collision which kills one of his friends. After taking a plea deal for DUI, Jacob is sentenced to 16 months at the California Institution for Men in Chino.

On his first night inside, Harlon overhears the gang rape of an inmate and decides to go on the offensive to survive. The next day, he attacks an African-American inmate when provoked, drawing the attention of Bottles, the "shot caller" for the white supremacist gang PEN1. Bottles recruits Harlon into the gang.

Over time, Harlon rises in rank, obtains the alias "Money", and grows even more hardened by prison life. During a riot, he stabs another inmate to defend the Sureños head. The act earns him other gang leaders' respect but also extends his sentence by nine years. To protect his family, Harlon ceases contact with his wife and tells her to start a new life with their son. Harlon is then transferred to Corcoran State Prison where he is introduced to "The Beast", the leader of the Aryan Brotherhood there. Impressed with Harlon's dedication, The Beast promotes him to second-in-command.

As Harlon's release nears, The Beast puts him in charge of a weapons deal with the Sureños. Although hesitant as he will be on parole, Harlon reluctantly complies after The Beast reminds him of the penalty for disobedience, which would involve the murder of his family. Upon release, he is greeted by Aryan soldier "Shotgun" and several newly inducted members, including Howie, a young Afghanistan war veteran with no criminal record. Harlon survives a drive-by shooting attempt on his life at a party and orders Howie to answer to no one but him.

Harlon's parole officer, Ed Kutcher, is tipped off about the deal and places him under surveillance. After Harlon has his life savings transferred to Katherine, she brings Joshua to meet him against his wishes. Joshua begs his father to leave the gang life and to reunite with his family, but Harlon refuses and slams the door in Joshua's face.

Discovering that Shotgun is Kutcher's informant, Harlon murders Shotgun in his home. After meeting the Sureños, Harlon texts their coordinates to Shotgun's cellphone for Kutcher to find. As the deal closes, the police, ATF, and SWAT surround the gangs. Howie, whom Harlon earlier urged to leave the criminal life and was forced to jump out of their vehicle, watches the arrest from a distance.

Fully validated for Shotgun's death, Harlon receives a life sentence. He turns down Kutcher's offer to testify against The Beast in exchange for a full pardon. Harlon is returned to Corcoran where The Beast, informed of his betrayal, states that Katherine and Joshua will die. Harlon anticipated The Beast's reaction and concealed a handcuff key and a razor blade on his body. He frees himself and after a brief fight outside of The Beast's cell, kills him. Ordering a prison guard to report that he acted in self-defense, Harlon succeeds him as leader of Corcoran's Brotherhood and sends Kutcher the location of the remaining weapons.

Harlon receives a letter from Joshua in which he forgives his father and tells him that he and Katherine will find a way to go on without him. Now content with his family's survival, Harlon is moved emotionally as he looks at pictures of his former life.

== Cast ==
- Nikolaj Coster-Waldau as Jacob "Money" Harlon
- Omari Hardwick as Ed Kutcher, Money's parole officer
- Lake Bell as Kate Harlon, Jacob's wife
- Jon Bernthal as Frank "Shotgun", Money's former prison buddy and associate, and PEN1 member
- Emory Cohen as Howie, a war veteran and Money's young acolyte
- Jeffrey Donovan as "Bottles", one of Money's key prison influencers and PEN1 shot caller
- Evan Jones as "Chopper", Money's former cellmate and an associate of Shotgun's
- Benjamin Bratt as Sheriff Manny Sanchez, who is partnered with Kutcher
- Holt McCallany as Jerry "The Beast" Manning, an Aryan Brotherhood shot caller
- Juan Pablo Raba as Herman Gómez, leader of the Sureños and a Mexican Mafia member
- Matt Gerald as Phil Cole, a parole officer chasing some gang members
- Michael Landes as Steve
- Jessy Schram as Jennifer, Tom's wife
- Keith Jardine as "Ripper", a member of the Nazi Low Riders
- Chris Browning as Toby "Redwood" Simms, a high ranking Aryan Brotherhood member
- Max Greenfield as Tom, Jacob's best friend

== Production ==
On April 9, 2015, Bold Films came on board to fully finance and produce the crime thriller film Shot Caller, to be directed by Ric Roman Waugh, based on his own script. Participant Media developed the project, while Participant's Jonathan King produced, along with Michel Litvak and Matthew Rhodes of Bold Films, and Waugh. In April 2015, Relativity Media acquired the U.S. rights to the film for $3 million with a wide release commitment, and Sierra/Affinity was on board to handle international sales. Since Relativity Media filed for bankruptcy in July 2015, the film's release was postponed until Saban Films acquired the U.S. distribution rights in April 2017.

Principal photography began on May 26, 2015, in Albuquerque and Santa Fe, New Mexico.

== Reception ==
On Rotten Tomatoes, the film has an approval rating of 70% based on 50 reviews, with an average score of 5.9/10, and the consensus reads "Shot Caller's weakness for action movie clichés is capably offset by strong work from Nikolaj Coster-Waldau in the central role". On Metacritic, the film has a score of 59 out of 100 based on reviews from 10 critics, indicating "mixed or average reviews".

Peter Debruge of Variety wrote: "It's a genre movie, to be sure, but there's an impressive sense of authenticity—in the language, the locations and the overall texture—that goes a long way to sell the scenario."
