= Marked (TV series) =

- Country of origin: United States
- No. of episodes: 6

Original release
- Network: History Channel
- Release: August 27 – October 8, 2009

Marked is an American television documentary series produced by NorthSouth Productions for the History Channel that premiered August 27, 2009, and aired through October 8, 2009. It explores the world of tattoos belonging to modern day tribes that operate at the edges of society, including motorcycle clubs, urban gangs, and hardcore prisoners.

The show takes the viewer into the minds of members as they explain what the mysterious symbols decorating their bodies mean on the street and mean to them personally. Initiation rites, turf wars, and the fierce pride of belonging to an outlaw family are all part of the territory. Tattoo artists and cultural experts explain the technique and history behind the ink and the groups it adorns, putting the personal experiences of the main characters into perspective.
