= ADX Florence =

Federal supermax prison in Fremont County, Colorado, US

United States Penitentiary, Administrative Maximum Facility
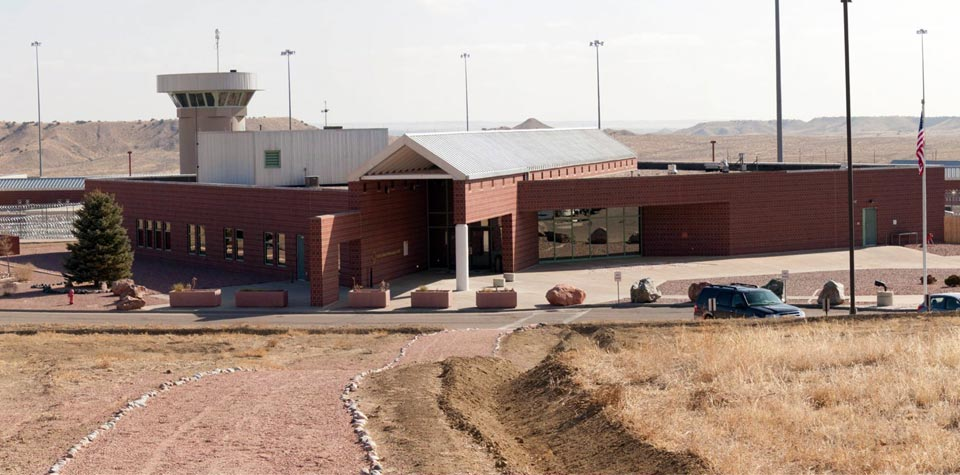

- Location in Colorado, US ADX Florence (the United States)
- Interactive map of United States Penitentiary, Administrative Maximum Facility
- Location: Fremont County, Colorado (near Florence); 38°21′23″N 105°05′43″W
- Status: Operational
- Security class: Administrative Maximum; colloquially Supermax
- Population: 405 inmates (March 2026)
- Opened: January 10, 1995
- Warden: Mistelle J. Starr
- Website: Official website

The United States Penitentiary, Administrative Maximum Facility (abbreviated as USP Florence ADMAX; commonly known as ADX Florence, Florence Supermax, and the Alcatraz of the Rockies) is a United States federal prison for men in Fremont County, Colorado, United States. It is operated by the Federal Bureau of Prisons, a division of the United States Department of Justice. The prison houses some of the most dangerous criminals in the United States.

ADX Florence, constructed in 1994 and opened the following year, is classed as a supermax or control unit prison, that provides a higher, more controlled level of custody than a regular maximum security prison (or high security, as it is called in the federal prison system). ADX Florence forms part of the Federal Correctional Complex, Florence (FCC Florence), which is situated on 49 acres (20 hectares) of land and houses different facilities with varying degrees of security, including the adjacent United States Penitentiary, Florence High.

ADX Florence was commissioned when the Federal Bureau of Prisons needed a unit designed specifically for the secure housing of specific prisoners most capable of extreme violence toward staff or other inmates, as well as inmates deemed too high-profile or too great a security risk for even a maximum security prison. The inmates are confined for most of the day in single cells with facilities made of poured, reinforced concrete to deter self-harm, and are under 24-hour supervision, carried out intensively with high staff–inmate ratios.

== Function ==
The institution is unofficially known as ADX Florence or "the Alcatraz of the Rockies". It is part of the Federal Correctional Complex, Florence, run by Federal Bureau of Prisons under the United States Department of Justice. The complex includes a minimum-security camp that, as of February 2019, held more prisoners than the supermax unit. The number of inmates has declined, and as of 2021, two housing units had closed due to low population.

Florence houses male inmates in the federal prison system deemed the most dangerous and in need of the tightest control, including prisoners whose escape would pose a serious threat to national security.

Women classified as a special management concern due to violence or escape attempts are confined at Federal Medical Center, Carswell, in Fort Worth, Texas.

== History ==
On October 22, 1983, Thomas Silverstein and Clayton Fountain, members of the Aryan Brotherhood, fatally stabbed correctional officers Merle Clutts and Robert Hoffman at the United States Penitentiary, Marion. The stabbings took place only a few hours apart and were blamed on inadequate prison design.

Federal Bureau of Prisons director Norman Carlson proposed a new facility to isolate the most dangerous, uncontrollable inmates for security and safety. Under his leadership, USP Marion was operated in permanent lockdown for 23 years, serving as a model for ADX as a control unit prison. Carlson believed that the prison would hold criminals who were desperate enough to murder corrections officers or other inmates in the hopes of being sentenced to death. He argued that as draconian as these measures were, they were the only way to deal with inmates who have absolutely no concern for human life.

Florence opened on January 10, 1995. The county already had nine prisons, but the lure of 750 to 900 permanent jobs (plus temporary jobs during the prison's construction) led residents to raise $160,000 to purchase 600 acres (240 ha) for the new prison. Hundreds of people attended the groundbreaking for the facility, which was designed by two architecture firms in Colorado Springs and cost $60 million to build.

== Inmate population ==
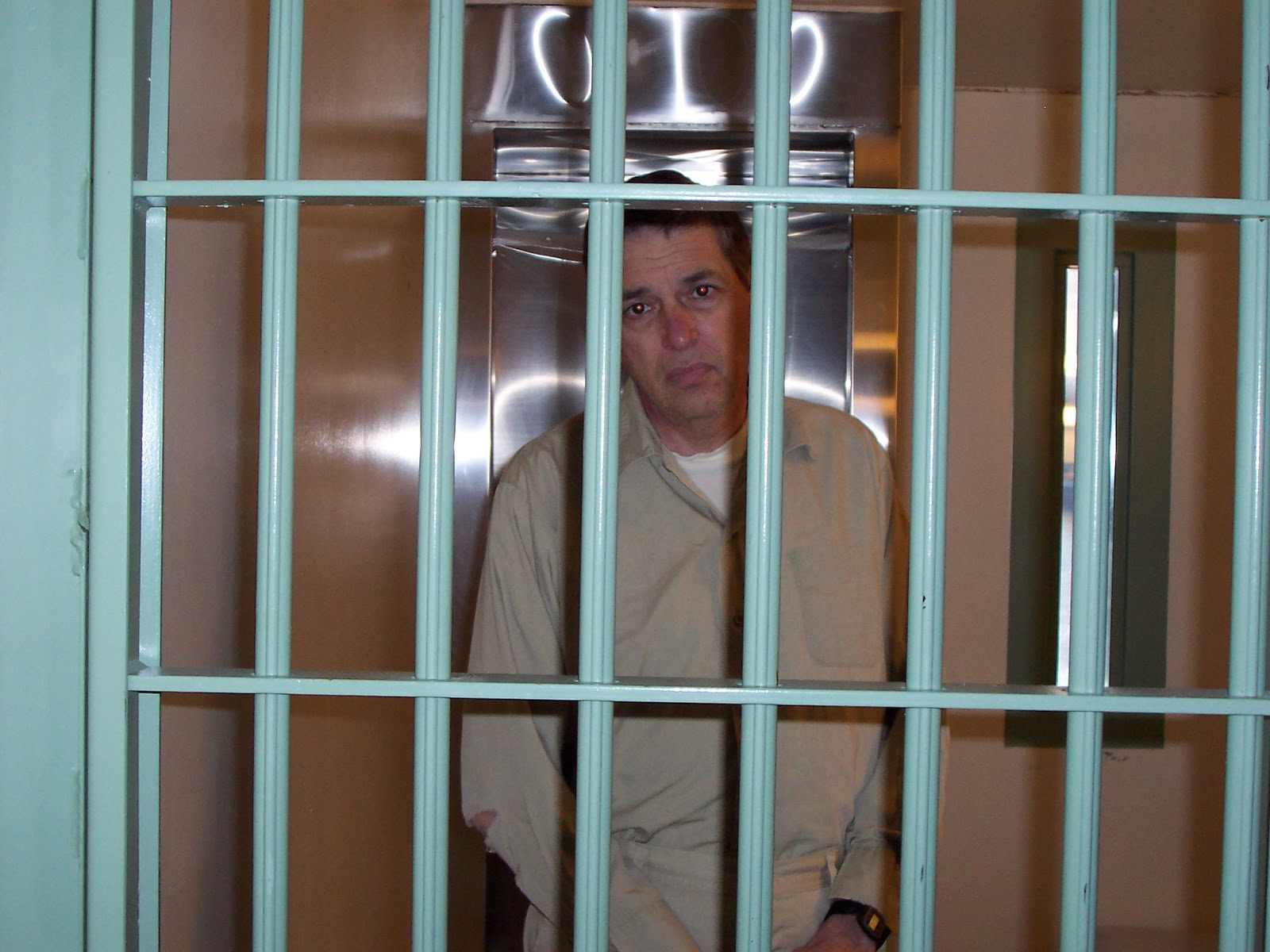
Robert Hanssen in his cell at ADX Florence

The supermax unit at Florence houses 408 male inmates as of April 2026, each assigned to one of six security levels. It is designed to house up to 474 inmates but has never been at full capacity.

The facility is best known for housing inmates who have been deemed too dangerous, too high-profile, or too great a security risk for even maximum-security prisons. For example, Joseph Romano was sentenced to life in federal prison for plotting to murder the judge and federal prosecutor who helped sentence him to 15 years in prison for masterminding a coin fraud operation. While in prison, he plotted to murder an undercover officer who had taken part in the investigation. When this came to light, Romano was transferred to Florence. Another notable inmate was Robert Hanssen, who spied for the Soviet Union and Russia on and off from 1978 until his arrest in 2001. Hanssen served a life sentence there and died in 2023. His case is considered the worst intelligence disaster in U.S. history.

The majority of current inmates, however, have an extensive history of committing violent crimes in other prisons, including murder, against corrections officers and fellow inmates. These inmates are kept in administrative segregation; they are kept in solitary confinement for 23 hours a day. During their hour outside the cell, which can occur at any time of day or night, they are kept under restraint (handcuffed, shackled, or both). The hour outside of the cell is for exercise and a phone call if they have earned the privilege. Their diet is restricted to ensure that the food cannot be used to harm themselves or to create unhygienic conditions in their cell. Some cells have showers, which are run on a timer to prevent flooding, further reducing the amount of handling of inmates that correctional officers have to perform.

After at least one year, depending on their conduct, inmates are gradually allowed out for longer periods. The long-term goal is to keep them at Florence for no more than three years and then to transfer them to a less restrictive prison to serve the remainder of their sentences. According to a 1998 report in the San Francisco Chronicle, Florence's main purpose is to try and extract reasonably peaceful behavior from extremely violent career prisoners.

One cell block at Florence was once known as "Bombers Row" because a number of particularly notable terrorists, including notable domestic terrorists, were held there: Timothy McVeigh, Ramzi Yousef, Ted Kaczynski, Eric Rudolph, and Dzhokhar Tsarnaev.

== Prison facility ==
Design of a cell at Florence

Artist's view of the cell

ADX Florence is a 37-acre (15 ha) complex located at 5880 Highway 67, in an unincorporated area, with a Florence, Colorado, postal address. It is located about 100 miles (160 km) south of Denver and 40 miles (64 km) south of Colorado Springs. It is part of the Federal Correctional Complex, Florence (FCC Florence) which consists of three correctional facilities, each with a different security rating.

The majority of the facility is above ground, with the exception of a subterranean corridor that links cellblocks to the lobby. Each cell contains a desk, stool, and bed, constructed almost entirely of poured concrete, as well as a toilet that shuts off if blocked, a shower that runs on a timer to prevent flooding, and a sink lacking a potentially dangerous tap. Cells are also fitted with polished steel mirrors bolted to the wall, electric lights that can be shut off or dimmed by the inmate, a radio, and a television given to inmates for good behavior; as of 2018, the television system included institution-run channels featuring announcements and educational courses, a number of general and specialty news and entertainment channels, and PG-rated films shown through the CCTV system.

The 4-inch-by-4-foot (10 cm × 1.2 m) windows are designed to prevent inmates from knowing their specific location within the complex. They can see only the sky and roof through them, so it is virtually impossible to plan an escape. Inmates exercise in a concrete pit resembling an empty swimming pool, also designed to prevent them from knowing their location in the facility. The pit is large enough only for a prisoner to walk ten steps in a straight line or thirty-one steps in a circle. Correctional officers generally deliver food to the cells. Inmates transferred to Florence from other prisons may be allowed to eat in a shared dining room.

The prison as a whole contains a multitude of motion detectors, cameras, and 1,400 remote-controlled steel doors. Officers in the prison's control center monitor inmates twenty-four hours a day and can activate a "panic button", which immediately closes every door in the facility, should an escape attempt be suspected. Pressure pads and 12-foot (3.7 m) razor-wire fences surround the perimeter, which is patrolled by heavily armed officers.

The facility houses inmates at six differing security levels: General Population Units ("Delta", "Echo", "Fox", and "Golf" Units), the Special Housing Unit (SHU), the Special Security Unit ("H" Unit), the Control Unit, Intermediate/Transitional Units ("Kilo" and "Joker" Units), and Range 13. Many of the security levels at ADX have special purposes or missions for the inmates who occupy them. The Control Unit houses inmates who have committed serious conduct violations or acts of violence at other institutions. It also houses high-level members of organizations deemed as threats, such as prison gangs. "H" Unit houses inmates who are members of terror groups so designated by the Department of Justice or who have had special administrative measures (SAMs) placed on them. Range 13 is a special four-cell wing within the Special Housing Unit for inmates in need of the tightest control. As of 2022, the only inmates publicly known to have been incarcerated in this unit are Ramzi Yousef, Thomas Silverstein, and Joaquín "El Chapo" Guzmán. The two Intermediate Units house step-down inmates, who can earn transfer to another institution if they remain incident-free while housed in the unit. This is the only unit in ADX where inmates secure themselves in their own cells, can walk freely in their range, and associate with other inmates. From there, inmates will typically be transferred to the supermax step-down unit in USP Florence High.

The Bureau of Prisons allowed the media to take a guided tour of Florence on September 14, 2007. Attending reporters remarked on an astonishing and eerie quiet within the prison, as well as a sense of safety due to the rigorous security measures. 60 Minutes producer Henry Schuster said, "A few minutes inside that cell and two hours inside Supermax were enough to remind me why I left high school a year early. The walls close in very fast."

The prison has received far less criticism than comparable facilities at the state level (such as California's Pelican Bay State Prison), which tend to suffer from over-population, low staff-to-inmate ratios, and security issues. Jamie Fellner of Human Rights Watch said after a tour of the facility in 1998, "The Bureau of Prisons has taken a harsh punitive model and implemented it as well as anybody I know."

== Notable incidents ==
Despite the extreme security measures to deter disruptive, violent, and dangerous behavior among inmates, there have been murders at ADX.

Silvestre Mayorqui Rivera and Richard Santiago were both charged with the first degree murder of Manuel Torres, a high-level member of the Mexican Mafia. Left alone with no guard supervision in the prison yard on the morning of April 21, 2005, Rivera and Santiago were videotaped brutally beating and stomping Torres to death. Rivera pleaded not guilty due to self-defense. Prosecutors intended to seek the death penalty against Rivera and Santiago, but they were both given life sentences for the murders. As of 2026, both Rivera and Santiago remain at ADX.

On April 10, 2025, U.S. attorney general Pam Bondi announced that the United States Department of Justice would seek the death penalty against ADX Florence inmate Ishmael Petty. Petty, who was convicted of multiple robberies in Tupelo, Mississippi, in December 1997, is accused of killing fellow inmate Walter Lee Gilbert—listed by the Federal Bureau of Prisons as LaMarcus Lee Hillard—by strangulation with a bedsheet on September 19, 2020. Petty was already serving a life sentence issued in 2002 for murdering his 71-year-old cellmate at United States Penitentiary, Pollock, and an additional 60-year sentence issued in 2015 for attacking two ADX librarians with an improvised prison shank. Gilbert was also serving a life sentence issued by the State of Mississippi after he murdered a fellow inmate at the Mississippi State Penitentiary with a weapon fashioned from a mop.

== Controversies ==
In 2012, eleven inmates filed a federal class-action suit against the Bureau of Prisons in Cunningham v. Federal Bureau of Prisons. The suit alleged chronic abuse and failure to properly diagnose prisoners who are seriously mentally ill. At the time of the lawsuit, at least six inmates had allegedly died by suicide; a seventh did so after the original lawsuit was filed, and an amended filing added him to the case.

Critics claim that the use of extended confinement in solitary cells severely affects prisoners' mental health, a conclusion supported by numerous studies. As of March 2015, settlement negotiations were underway with the help of a federal magistrate. Some changes had by then already been made by the Bureau of Prisons.

Prisoners held in Unit H are subject to special administrative measures (SAMs) that prevent them from communicating with journalists or privately with their own lawyers or family members.

In 2020, a British district judge refused to extradite Julian Assange to the United States on espionage charges in part because he would possibly be subjected to solitary confinement and special administrative measures at ADX. On July 7, 2021, the High Court of Justice for England and Wales agreed to allow the United States to appeal this decision with the understanding that Assange will not be subject to SAMs or imprisoned at ADX if extradited. Eventually, Assange pleaded guilty to a charge under the Espionage Act of conspiracy to obtain and disclose national defense information and sentenced to 62 months' time served.

== Suicides at the prison ==
At least nine inmates have died, or are suspected of having died, by suicide at the facility.

Inmate	Register number	Date of death	Age	Sentence upon suicide	Details	Ref.
Kevin Lee Wilson	57468-097	June 17, 1999	37	66-years and 10-months	From Glendale, California; convicted of multiple counts of armed bank robbery, carrying a firearm during a crime of violence, and felon in possession of a firearm.	
Gregory Britt	12546-083	December 9, 1999	43	Life	Convicted of the murder of a fellow inmate at the Lorton Correctional Complex in Lorton, Virginia, on June 19, 1983.	
Lawrence Klaker	Unlisted	November 18, 2002	45	Life plus five years	Convicted in 1986 of escaping a jail in New Orleans, then kidnapping a schoolteacher in Alabama; later became an enforcer for the Aryan Brotherhood in federal prison.	
Lance Vanderstappen	11099-081	April 17, 2006	26	25 years	Member of the Soldiers of Aryan Culture; committed various violent assaults in prison, including stabbing a fellow inmate in a courthouse holding cell.	
John Frierson	99917-555	May 27, 2008	35	Four consecutive life sentences	Sentenced in Mississippi Circuit Court after he went on a shooting rampage at the age of 17 that killed his grandparents, brother, and aunt. Frierson was transferred to ADX after killing a fellow inmate at the Mississippi State Penitentiary.	
Jose Martin Vega	45189-053	May 1, 2010	35	Four consecutive life sentences plus 190 years	Gang member from New York City; convicted of multiple counts of racketeering and armed drug trafficking.	
Robert Gerald Knott	17508-086	September 7, 2013	48	Life	Convicted of carrying out a nine-day crime spree across multiple states that included several kidnappings and resulted in the death of a hostage and his accomplice in 1988.	
Boyd Wallace Higginbotham	11044-040	December 25, 2015	57	Life	Convicted of stabbing a fellow inmate to death at United States Penitentiary, Coleman II while serving a 210-month sentence for felon in possession of a firearm.	
Jamie Jarold McMahan	05327-030	November 13, 2017	42	Life	Sentenced to life in prison alongside his stepbrother, Christopher Kauffman, after they committed a methamphetamine-induced rampage that included two homicides and a bank robbery in Oskaloosa, Iowa, before fleeing with two women to Florida.	

== In popular culture ==
In the 2011 novel Locked On by Tom Clancy and Mark Greaney, "The Emir" is housed in ADX Florence under the highest level of security. His sketches of John Clark and Domingo Chavez, smuggled out through his lawyer, Judith Cochran, play a pivotal role in the plot.

In the 2023 fiction thriller novel Only the Dead by author and retired US Navy SEAL Jack Carr, protagonist James Reece is housed in Range 13 after being suspected of an assassination attempt on a fictitious characterization of the president of the United States.

In the episode "Svengali" from Law and Order: SVU, criminal Robert Morten is transferred to ADX Florence after he masterminded several killings while already incarcerated at a less secure facility.

In the series finale of Better Call Saul, the title character Jimmy McGill (Saul Goodman) is sentenced to 86 years at a fictionalized version of ADX Florence called ADX Montrose.

== See also ==
- List of United States federal prisons
- Federal Medical Center, Carswell, contains an Administrative Unit which is the equivalent to the ADX for federal female inmates. It also houses female federal inmates sentenced to death.
- Special Handling Unit, a supermax prison operated by Corrections Canada
- HM Prison Belmarsh, a UK high security prison operated by His Majesty's Prison Service. A High Security Unit (HSU), akin to a supermax, is contained within the prison grounds.
- Goulburn Correctional Centre, a high security prison in Australia that contains the "High Risk Management Centre", commonly known as "Supermax".
