= Special administrative measure =

Restrictions on prisoner communication, including monitoring talks with their attorney

A special administrative measure (SAM) is a process under United States law (28 CFR 501.3; see also USAM title 9 chapter 24 — Requests for Special Confinement Conditions) whereby the United States Attorney General may direct the United States Bureau of Prisons to use "special administrative measures" regarding housing of and correspondence and visitors to specific inmates. It includes prisoners awaiting or being tried, as well as those convicted, when it is alleged there is a "substantial risk that a prisoner's communications or contacts with persons could result in death or serious bodily injury to persons, or substantial damage to property that would entail the risk of death or serious bodily injury to persons." Such measures are used to prevent acts of violence or terrorism or disclosure of classified information.

The law is considered particularly controversial because it permits monitoring of attorney–client communications of designated prisoners. Initiated in November 2001, the Department of Justice considered this an expansion of an existing regulation; formerly, such restrictions had only been allowed through court orders. The law specifies that information protected by attorney–client privilege cannot be used for prosecution; however, communications related to ongoing or contemplated illegal acts are not covered.

As of May 22, 2009, 44 out of 205,000 federal inmates were subject to SAMs: 29 incarcerated on terrorism-related charges, 11 on violent crime-related charges and four on espionage charges. Well known individuals who have been under special administrative measures include American Taliban fighter John Walker Lindh and organized crime figure Frank Calabrese, Sr. Perhaps the best known application of this provision was the prosecution of attorney Lynne Stewart and interpreter Mohamed Yousry for passing messages between Omar Abdel-Rahman and his supporters in violation of a special administrative measure against communications. After her conviction, sentencing and re-sentencing to 10 years in prison, she appealed on freedom of speech grounds. Other cases include Robert Hanssen, Syed Fahad Hashmi, and Dzhokhar Tsarnaev, the Boston Marathon bomber, who never could speak privately to his attorneys.

== See also ==
- Civil liberties in the United States
- Human rights in the United States
