= Hard Time (comics) =

Comic series published by DC Comics

Publication information
- Publisher: DC Comics
- Schedule: Monthly
- Format: Ongoing
- Publication date: Vol. 1: April 2004 – March 2005; Vol. 2: December 2005 – June 2006
- No. of issues: Vol. 1: Twelve; Vol. 2: Seven
- Main character: Ethan Harrow

Creative team
- Written by: Steve Gerber; Mary Skrenes
- Penciller: Brian Hurtt

Hard Time is a comic book series written by Steve Gerber and Mary Skrenes and originally published by DC Focus, a short-lived imprint of DC Comics. The aim of the imprint was to feature super-powered characters who did not follow the traditional format of classic superhero adventures. Hard Time's first run was 12 issues long, published from April 2004 to March 2005.

The series returned from hiatus in December 2005, titled Hard Time: Season Two. With the demise of DC Focus, this run was published under the unfocused DC bullet. The comic ended with issue #7 of Season Two in June 2006.

== Storyline ==
=== Backstory ===
Hard Time focuses on 15-year-old Ethan Harrow (early publicity referred to him as "Ethan Chiles"), who was involved in a high-school shooting scare gone wrong which cost several students their lives. For two years Travis Danes and the high school football team bullied Ethan and his friend Brandon Snood, whose home life was fairly bad. After Travis and two of his friends tried to rape a girl named Inez Mellencamp, Brandon stopped it by setting off the fire alarm. Travis and his friends merely got suspended for a week. Later Ethan and Brandon plan a "fake" school shooting as a way of getting back at the jocks. Things go wrong and Brandon winds up shooting several students and faculty members. As Ethan later tells his lawyer, "it was supposed to be a joke. Brandon told me the guns were loaded with blanks". Ethan is initially in shock, but when Brandon levels his gun at Alyssa Nichols, a girl that Ethan has feelings for, Ethan tries to stop him. Unsuccessful at first, Ethan's super-power emerges, killing Brandon.

After the shooting, Travis was paralyzed and Brandon was dead, along with four others. Although Ethan was not directly involved with the murders, he was tried as an adult and given fifty years to life in prison with eligibility for parole in the year 2053. Ethan maintains that the media convicted him before he ever got to trial.

=== Season one ===
While in prison, Ethan continues to manifest a superpower called the "KHE-CHARE" that appears as psychic manifestation of his alter ego while he sleeps, or is otherwise unconscious. A fellow inmate, the elderly "Fruitcake" eventually instructs Ethan on the use of his power and its origin. Initially, Ethan is unaware of his alter ego, which acted on his suppressed emotions of anger and revenge. Ethan eventually learns how to control his powers and use them even in a conscious state.

While in prison, Ethan encounters a number of people, including:

Prison Staff

- Harvey Brickman, the warden
- Dr. Robert Dinkens, a psychiatrist

Inmates

- Hubert "Curly" Wallace, Ethan's cellmate and grandfather to Norma "Red" Rothenberg.
- George W. Cole, who gives Ethan the nickname "Prodigy". Released in 2009 and dead in 2010 in attempting a robbery.
- Alonzo "Fruitcake" Mullins, who knows of Ethan's powers. Dead on December 16, 2012, stroke in bed.
- Arturo Lopez, a Latino gang member whose girlfriend Mercedes is pregnant; later on in life (40 so years later) he is a "Don Arturo" and released.
- Cindy Crane, a transgender woman. Released in 2011, obtained sexual reassignment surgery, and inherited her mother's salon.
- Swift, Cindy's lover and a member of the Aryan Brotherhood, deceased.
- Gantry the Preacher, an arsonist, deceased.
- Lewis Gatherwood, a rapist, deceased.
- Raeder, the gang boss of the Aryan Brotherhood.
- Alcazar, the gang boss of the Diablos, a Latino gang.
- Kilo, Samoan, big man willing to throw his weight, for a candy bar or two.
- Everly, a craftsman who makes things out of glass, plastic, or wood for porn.
- Brazo, a one-armed artist who always needs supplies.
- Saeed, a prison smuggler who likes cigarettes and pruno.
- Duane Cutter, serial killer who carved up his victims.

While Ethan is in prison, life goes on outside. Ethan's mother, Sheila Harrow is dating Jack Forbes, his lawyer. Norma "Red" Rothenberg, the granddaughter of Curly corresponds with Ethan. Also, Alyssa Nichols, now institutionalized and currently residing at the Shady Grove mental institution, sends him letters thanking him for saving her life. She asked Ethan to write back, and the two share a dream-like relationship.

On Ethan Harrow's 16th birthday, Red, the granddaughter of one of Ethan's fellow inmates, takes his virginity against the door of the visitor's restroom. Mercedes goes into labour as she and Arturo are being married. Ethan's lawyer asks his mother to marry him, but she said no.

=== Season two ===
The first issue of Season Two was released on December 7, 2005.

Ethan met with his lawyer, who is trying to get him a new trial, and Red's parents, Julius and Truth Rothenberg, representatives of "The Prisoners' Rights Foundation". Ethan told them the full story of the school shooting. Jack told Ethan that the judge was up for an election and couldn't look "soft" on high school shooters. Jack told Ethan to stay out of trouble until the new trial.

A new inmate named Cutter, who is a psycho, arrives at the prison. Cole starts schooling Ethan in "Prison Economics". Ethan's Khe-Chara starts having violent revulsion to Cutter, so "Fruitcake" gives him a "Third Eye". The Cutter befriends Hardin and Cindy into his "Sphere of Influence".

Hard Time Season Two #7 jumps ahead 49 years to the year 2053, to the end of Ethan's sentence. His mind is scanned, to determine whether he is genuinely repentant for his crime; in the process, the various fates of everyone he met while in prison are revealed, as are many details about how his superhuman power functioned (which allowed him to send out his astral form to experience numerous activities outside the prison), and what happened to the people outside of prison. Eventually he is ruled to have truly atoned, and is released. He walks out the prison gate and sees a floating limousine is waiting for him; although the readers do not see who is inside the limousine, Ethan does, and gets in.

== Weries ==
- Hard Time (imprint DC Focus) #1–12 (April 2004 – March 2005)
- Hard Time: Season 2, #1–7 (December 2005 – June 2006)

== Collected editions ==
- Hard Time: 50 to Life (collects Hard Time #1–6, 144 pages, 2004, ISBN 978-1401204716)
- Hard Time: Sixteen (collects Hard Time #7–12, 144 pages, 2013, ISBN 978-1401237943)
- Hard Time: The Complete Series (collects Seasons 1 and 2), 464 pages, 2020, ISBN 978-1779508218)
