= Domestic Extremism Lexicon =

The Domestic Extremism Lexicon is a reference aid released by the United States Department of Homeland Security (DHS) that defines different classifications of domestic extremists. The document was released on March 26, 2009, but was pulled only weeks later. The report identifies six types of active white supremacist groups in the U.S.

The report resulted in backlash, with several right wing congress members complaining it was biased and military supporters concerned about what it said of veteran's potential for radicalization. Among the criticized aspects of the report was its conflation of anti-abortion with right wing extremism and terrorism. The DHS responded to the controversy by retracting the report; one commentator accused them of backtracking on this point. A revised edition was going to be released the next year, but fearing another controversy it was delayed and eventually shelved.
