= Clayton Fountain =

American murderer (1955–2004)

- Born: September 12, 1955; Fort Benning, Georgia, U.S.
- Died: July 12, 2004 (aged 48); MCFP Springfield, Springfield, Missouri, U.S.
- Convictions: Federal; First degree murder Voluntary manslaughter Conveying a weapon in prison Military; Premeditated murder Kidnapping (4 counts); Assault with a deadly weapon (4 counts); Aggravated assault Attempted escape Robbery (2 counts); Larceny; Lifting a weapon against a senior officer Possession of deadly weapon (2 counts); Unlawful detention (2 counts)
- Penalty: Life imprisonment

Details
- Victims: 5
- Span of crimes: 1974–1983
- Country: Philippines and the United States

Clayton Anthony Fountain (September 12, 1955 – July 12, 2004) was an American federal prisoner, member of the Aryan Brotherhood, and a convicted murderer.

== Biography ==
Fountain was born on September 12, 1955, at the U.S. Army Hospital in Fort Benning, Georgia. He was the oldest of six children, having one brother and four sisters, and was named after his father, Clayton Raleigh Fountain. The family moved every 1½ to 2 years. While his father served combat tours in Korea and Vietnam and his mother was working, Clayton, as the oldest child in family, became a surrogate for both parents when he was very young. He recalled responsibilities for cooking, ironing, serving, cleaning, and caring for his young siblings.

While serving in the US Marines, he was convicted of murdering Staff Sergeant Douglas J. Wrin in 1974, while stationed in the Philippines. He stole and disassembled a pistol from the ship's armory, brought it ashore, and used it to rob a Filipino guard of his shotgun. He then used the shotgun to murder his staff sergeant. No words were exchanged as Fountain shot him once in the chest, and after a brief walk he took five hostages. Fountain had been reprimanded recently by Staff Sergeant Wrin for wearing PT gear on the mess deck in the mess hall. Fountain later had two years added to his sentence for aggravated assault and attempted escape.

Fountain was sentenced to life imprisonment, and was ultimately sent to the United States Penitentiary, Marion, which was at the time the highest-security prison in the United States. Fountain murdered three prisoners and one correctional officer with a shiv while serving time at Marion, and was labeled the "Most Dangerous Prisoner" in the federal system. Fountain and another inmate, Hugh Colomb, who was serving a 25-year sentence for armed bank robbery, were convicted of voluntary manslaughter and conveying a weapon in prison and had 15 years added to their sentences. Colomb was released from prison in 2015. He died on June 21, 2016, at the age of 62.

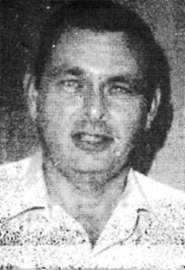
Correction Officer Robert L. Hoffmann

On October 22, 1983, Fountain stabbed correction officer Robert L. Hoffmann to death, hours after Fountain's friend and fellow Aryan Brotherhood member Thomas Silverstein stabbed another correction officer, Merle Clutts, to death at the same facility. The incidents resulted in a 23-year lockdown at Marion, and contributed to the creation of the federal supermax prison, United States Penitentiary, Florence ADX. The murders of Hoffman, Clutts, and the other inmates outraged U.S. Attorney General William French Smith, who urged Congress to reinstate the federal death penalty. He said the inmates were killing "for sport" and doing so with effective impunity since they were already serving the maximum sentence allowed under federal law in the disciplinary section of a maximum security federal prison.

"These inmates were already serving life sentences in the disciplinary section of the most maximum security prison in the country. They knew there was nothing else the federal prison system could do to them. They knew they had nothing to lose."

Fountain was moved to the United States Medical Center for Federal Prisoners in Springfield, Missouri. He was housed in a specially constructed confinement unit, and was allowed contact only with authorized personnel. Fountain converted to Catholicism, and completed several educational courses on theology during the twenty years he spent in virtual isolation. He remotely earned an associate degree in business and a bachelor's degree in philosophy and business from Ohio University, and earned a Catholic Catechetical Diploma and began a Master of Arts in Religious Studies from Catholic Distance University. He developed ties with an order of Trappist monks, and was accepted posthumously as a lay brother after his death from a heart attack in 2004. The book A Different Kind of Cell: The Story of a Murderer Who Became a Monk is based on his life and religious conversion. The foreword was written by Sister Helen Prejean.

== Victims ==
- Staff Sergeant Douglas J. Wrin, 1974, Philippines
- Charles Stewart, 1979, USP, Marion
- Robert Chappelle, 1981, USP, Marion
- Raymond Smith, 1982, USP, Marion
- Robert Hoffman, 1983 USP, Marion

Fountain committed the murders of Chappelle and Smith with fellow inmate Thomas Silverstein. He was convicted of manslaughter for Stewart's slaying, whom he killed alongside Hugh Colomb.

== See also ==
- List of serial killers in the United States
- Thomas Silverstein
