= Federal Correctional Institution, Marion =

Prison near Marion, Illinois, United States

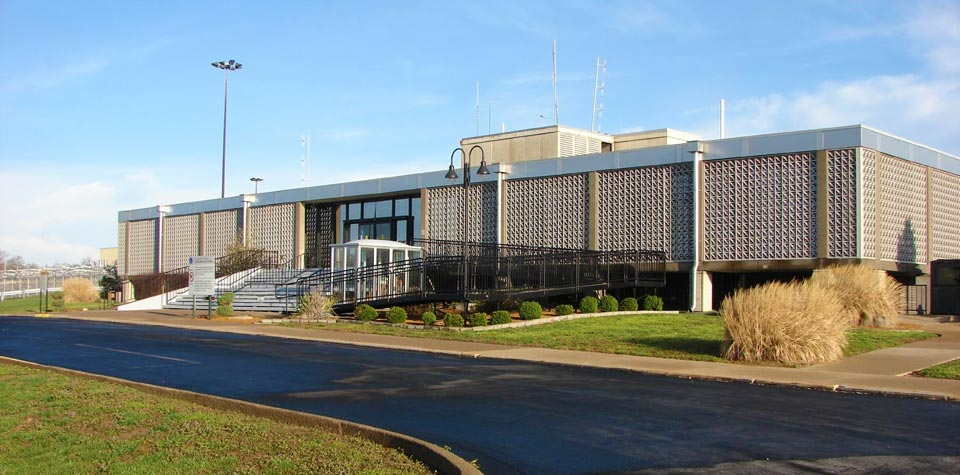
- Interactive map of Federal Correctional Institution, Marion
- Location: Southern Precinct, Williamson County, near Marion, Illinois; 37°39′47″N 88°59′3″W
- Status: Operational
- Security class: Medium-security (with minimum-security prison camp)
- Population: 1,298 [1,117 at the USP, 181 in prison camp] (September 2023)
- Opened: 1963
- Managed by: Federal Bureau of Prisons
- Warden: Daniel Sproul
- Website: Official website

The Federal Correctional Institution, Marion (FCI Marion) is a large medium-security United States federal prison for male inmates in Southern Precinct, unincorporated Williamson County, Illinois. It is operated by the Federal Bureau of Prisons, a division of the United States Department of Justice. The facility also has an adjacent satellite prison camp that houses minimum security male offenders.

FCI Marion in Southern Illinois is approximately 9 miles (14 km) south of the city of Marion, Illinois, 300 miles (480 km) south of Chicago, and 120 miles (190 km) southeast of St. Louis, Missouri.

== History ==
FCI Marion was built and opened in 1963 as United States Penitentiary, Marion (USP Marion), to replace the maximum security federal prison on Alcatraz Island in San Francisco, which closed the same year. On May 16, 2025, a tornado hit the Penitentiary but no injuries were reported on site.

== Influence ==
Several prisons in Iran, including two maximum-security prisons in Shiraz and Mashhad, were built in the 1960s, at the time an autocracy under the last shah and later a theocratic Islamic republic, from blueprints of USP Marion as the US and Iranian systems experimented with confining and controlling "trouble" populations, with new experiments in solitary confinement and "group therapy" sessions. The blueprints were also used for prisons in Israel, New Zealand, and elsewhere.

== Notable incidents ==
=== High-profile escape attempts ===
The first escape from USP Marion was on July 21, 1971, when Warren George Briggs leapt over two 15-foot (4.6 m) fences and escaped to Kansas City, Missouri, via Interstate 57. Four days later, Warren turned himself in to the FBI. He reportedly did this so he could draw attention to his invention, a water desalination process.

On October 10, 1975, five inmates used an illegal homemade electronic device to open the front gates of the prison. One of them had been an electrician and was assigned to work on the lock mechanisms of all of the doors in the main corridors. He also converted a radio into a remote control, with which he opened all of the doors. The five escapees were all eventually captured and returned to prison, the last one being apprehended in Canada on October 31, 1975.

Two escape attempts occurred in 1978 involving the same inmate, Garrett Brock Trapnell. On May 24, 1978, Trapnell's friend, 43-year-old Barbara Ann Oswald, hijacked a St. Louis based charter helicopter and ordered the pilot, Allen Barklage, to fly to USP Marion. Barklage complied, but he wrestled the gun away from Oswald and fatally shot her while he was landing in the prison yard, thwarting the escape. On December 21, 1978, Oswald's 17-year-old daughter, Robin Oswald, hijacked TWA Flight 541, which was en route from Louisville International Airport to Kansas City International Airport and threatened to detonate dynamite strapped to her body if the pilot did not fly to Williamson County Regional Airport, located only miles from USP Marion. When the pilot landed at the airport in Marion, hundreds of cops showed up, Robin Oswald surrendered to F.B.I. negotiators at the Williamson airport without incident about ten hours later. The dynamite was later found to be fake.

The last escape from the maximum-security prison area was on February 14, 1979, when Lawrence Caldwell, Albert Garza and Howard Zumberge climbed both exterior fences in a dense fog; Caldwell was caught before he could clear the first of the two fences. Both Garza and Zumberge were apprehended three days later near Cypress, hiding in a church basement. During the capture of the escapees, Garza shot Johnson County Sheriff Elry Faulkner in the chest at almost point-blank range; Faulkner, however, was wearing a ballistic vest and only suffered minor bruises. Garza was shot and wounded, but survived and returned to Marion two months later.

=== Murders of correction officers Clutts and Hoffmann ===
Correction Officer Merle Clutts

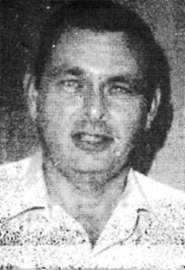
Correction Officer Robert Hoffmann

On October 22, 1983, correctional officers Clutts and Hoffmann were killed in separate incidents only hours apart, both at the hands of members of the Aryan Brotherhood, a white-supremacist prison gang. Officer Clutts was stabbed to death by Thomas Silverstein. While walking down a hall accompanied by Clutts, Silverstein was able to turn to the side and approach a particular cell. The prisoner in that cell subsequently unlocked Silverstein's handcuffs with a stolen key and provided him with a knife. Later that same morning, Officer Hoffmann was stabbed to death by Clayton Fountain, after Hoffmann had pulled Fountain off another officer who was being attacked.

== Permanent lockdown and the birth of the supermax ==
As a result of the murders of Clutts and Hoffmann, USP Marion went into "permanent lockdown" with all inmates locked in their cells for the majority of the day. USP Marion was effectively transformed into a "control unit" prison, also called supermax, or "super-maximum" security. This method of prison operation involves the keeping of inmates in solitary confinement for 23 hours a day, and does not allow communal dining, exercising, or religious services.

Years later, Norman Carlson, director of the Bureau of Prisons at the time of the Marion incident, said that as draconian as the permanent lockdown was, he believed it the only way to deal with "a very small subset of the inmate population who show absolutely no concern for human life." He pointed out that the two inmates who killed the guards were already serving multiple life sentences, so adding another would have had no effect. The "control unit" model at Marion was later the basis for ADX Florence, which opened in 1994 as a specifically designed supermax prison.

== Downgraded to medium-security prison ==
In 2006, USP Marion's designation was changed to a medium security prison and major renovations were made. The renovations increased Marion's inmate population from 383 to 901.

In 2024, USP Marion was renamed to FCI Marion.

== Communication Management Unit ==
Although the facility no longer operates as a "supermax" facility, FCI Marion is now home to one of two "Communication Management Units" in the federal prison system. The other is at the Federal Correctional Complex, Terre Haute, Indiana. The Federal Bureau of Prisons created the Communication Management Unit (CMU) in response to criticism that it had not been adequately monitoring the communications of prisoners. "By concentrating resources in this fashion, it will greatly enhance the agency's capabilities for language translation, content analysis and intelligence sharing," according to the Bureau's summary of the CMU. In a Democracy Now! interview on June 25, 2009, animal rights activist Andrew Stepanian talked about being jailed at the CMU. Stepanian is believed to be the first prisoner released from a CMU.

== Significant inmates ==
† Inmates who were released from custody prior to 1982 are not listed on the Federal Bureau of Prisons website.
†† The Sentencing Reform Act of 1984 eliminated parole for most federal inmates. Inmates sentenced for offenses committed prior to 1987 are eligible for parole consideration.

=== Foreign terrorists ===
Foreign citizens who committed or attempted terrorist attacks against United States citizens and interests.

Inmate Name	Register Number	Status	Details
Mohammed Saleh	34853-054	Served a 35-year sentence, released on September 1, 2023.	Al-Qaeda operatives and followers of Sheikh Omar Abdel Rahman; convicted in 1996 of seditious conspiracy and other charges for their involvement in the foiled NYC landmark bomb plot.
Clement Hampton-El	34854-054	Died in 2014 while serving a 35-year sentence.	Al-Qaeda operatives and followers of Sheikh Omar Abdel Rahman; convicted in 1996 of seditious conspiracy and other charges for their involvement in the foiled NYC landmark bomb plot.
Mohammed A. Salameh	34338-054	Serving an 86-year and 11-month sentence.	Palestinian terrorist, convicted perpetrator of the 1993 World Trade Center bombing.
Mohamed Rashed Daoud Al-Owhali	42371-054	Serving a life sentence. Transferred to ADX Florence.	Al-Qaeda operative; convicted of murder, conspiracy to commit murder and conspiracy to use a weapon of mass destruction, in relation to his role in the 1998 United States embassy bombings in Nairobi, Kenya. Sentenced to life in prison in 2001.
Iyman Faris	46680-083	Served a 20-year sentence; released on August 18, 2020.	Al-Qaeda operative; pleaded guilty in 2003 to terrorism conspiracy for researching potential targets, including the Brooklyn Bridge in New York City, and obtaining equipment to be used in attacks at the behest of Al-Qaeda leader Osama bin Laden.
Omar Rezaq	20267-016	Serving a life sentence; eligible for release in 2023.††	Follower of the militant Palestinian leader Abu Nidal and the sole surviving hijacker of EgyptAir Flight 648; 58 people were killed during the 1985 hijacking; Rezaq was convicted of air piracy in 1996.
Abdul Murad	37437-054	Serving a life sentence. Transferred to USP Terre Haute	Al-Qaeda operative; convicted in 1996 of conspiracy in connection with planning Project Bojinka, a foiled plot conceived by senior Al-Qaeda member Khalid Sheikh Mohammed to bomb twelve planes over the Pacific Ocean in a 48-hour period.
Dritan Duka	61285-066	Serving life plus 30 years. Transferred to FCI Terre Haute.	One of the six men that conspired to attack an Army Base in Fort Dix, New Jersey. His brothers Eljvir Duka and Shain Duka are being held USP Hazelton and ADX Florence, respectively.

=== Domestic terrorists ===
American citizens who committed or attempted terrorist attacks against United States citizens and interests.

Inmate Name	Register Number	Photo	Status	Details
Francis Schaeffer Cox	16179-006		Transferred to RRM Seattle. Serving a 25-year and ten-month sentence; scheduled for release on September 6, 2024.	Leader of the Alaska Peacekeepers Militia; convicted in 2012 of murder conspiracy for plotting the murders of judges and law enforcement agents; two co-defendants were also sentenced to prison.
Michael Finton	17031-026		Transferred to FCI Bennettsville. Serving a 28-year sentence; scheduled for release on January 11, 2034.	Follower of the late militant cleric Anwar Al-Awlaki; pleaded guilty in 2011 to attempted use of a weapon of mass destruction for plotting to destroy a federal building in Illinois with a truck bomb in 2009.
Carlos Almonte	61800-050		Transferred to FCI Fairton. Serving a 20-year sentence; scheduled for release on June 20, 2027.	Pleaded guilty to conspiracy to murder persons outside the US, and for attempting to join Al Shabaab, a terrorist group based in Somalia; co-conspirator Mohamed Alessa was sentenced to 22 years.
Alexis Candelario Santana	34421-069		Transferred to MDC Guaynabo. Serving a life sentence.	Convicted in 2013 for the 2009 Sabana Seca massacre
Richard Scutari	34840-080		Transferred to FCI Mendota. Serving a 60-year sentence; scheduled for release on June 26, 2025.	Former member of the white supremacist group The Order. Convicted in 1987 of conspiracy, racketeering, and robbery.
Cesar Altieri Sayoc	17781-104		Transferred to FCI Butner Medium II. Serving a 20-year sentence, scheduled for release on November 10, 2035.	Pleaded guilty to mailing explosive devices to critics of US President Donald Trump. These included leading Democratic Party politicians such as former U.S. President Barack Obama, former U.S. Vice President Joe Biden, and former U.S. Secretary of State Hillary Clinton. One package was addressed only to CNN and sent to its world headquarters.
Kaleb James Cole	13964-579		Serving a seven-year sentence; scheduled for release on June 17, 2025.	The FBI had sought an Extreme Risk Protection Order against Cole and seized his cache of weapons which included five assault rifles, a shotgun and pistols in October 2019. According to the FBI Cole had also acquired separate parts needed to manufacture untraceable AR-15s. Seattle City Attorney Pete Holmes told the media they "firmly believe, prevented a massacre". Cole was sentenced for conspiring to threaten Jews, black people and journalists in Washington and two other states.
Zachary Adam Chesser	76715-083		Transferred to ADX Florence and then to USP Hazelton. Serving a 25-year sentence; scheduled for release on January 1, 2032.	Convicted in 2010 for attempting to provide material support to a designated foreign terrorist organization by aiding Al-Shabaab, a militant group with ties to Al-Qaeda. He was also convicted for desensitizing law enforcement by ordering people to plant fake explosive devices. Chesser was also convicted for sending threats (via Revolution Muslim website) to Trey Parker and Matt Stone, creators of South Park, after they aired an episode of the show with depictions of Muhammad.

=== Organized crime figures ===
Inmate Name	Register Number	Photo	Status	Details
John Gotti†	18261-053		Deceased. Died in 2002 while serving a life sentence.	Boss of the Gambino crime family in New York City from 1985 to 1992; convicted of murder, murder conspiracy, loansharking, illegal gambling, obstruction of justice, bribery, and tax evasion in 1992.
William Daddano, Sr.†	Unlisted		Deceased. Died in 1975 while serving a 15-year sentence.	Top loan shark and enforcer for the Chicago Mafia; convicted in 1964 of conspiracy to commit bank robbery.
Thomas Silverstein	14634-116		Deceased. Served most of his life sentence at ADX Florence and died on May 11, 2019, due to complications from heart surgery.	Aryan Brotherhood prison gang leader (considered one of the most dangerous inmates in the federal prison system); transferred to ADX after murdering Correction Officer Merle Clutts at USP Marion in 1983 while serving a sentence for bank robbery. The murder of two correctional officers in 1983 was the impetus for creating the "super-max" prison classification.
Nicodemo Scarfo	09813-050		Transferred to the FCI Butner Medium, a medium-security facility; was serving a 55-year sentence; was scheduled for release in 2033 but died at Butner on 17 January 2017 at age 87.	Former boss of the Bruno crime family in Philadelphia; he was convicted on multiple counts of murder, attempted murder, distribution of methamphetamine, and extortion.
Viktor Bout	91641-054		Served a 25-year sentence; released on December 12, 2022 in a prisoner exchange with Russia for Brittney Griner.	Russian arms dealer; convicted in 2011 of conspiring to kill Americans and supplying anti-aircraft missiles and other weapons to FARC, a Marxist group on the U.S. State Department list of Foreign Terrorist Organizations.
Gerard Ouimette	02519-070		Served sentence in the mid-20th-century. Died on April 19, 2015.	Associate of the Patriarca crime family from Providence, Rhode Island
Monzer al-Kassar	61111-054		Transferred to USP Florence High. Serving a 30-year sentence; scheduled for release on December 28, 2032.	In 2009, sentenced to 30 years in prison for conspiring to sell weapons to Colombian rebels.
Carlos Lehder	91641-054		Transferred to another prison. Released from prison 16 June 2020, after more than 33 years and 4 months in captivity.	Colombian druglord; convicted in 1987 of conspiring to send cocaine to USA. Life imprisonment plus 135 years; commuted to 55 years in prison after testifying against Manuel Noriega.

=== Others ===
Inmate Name	Register Number	Photo	Status	Details
Pete Rose	01832-061		Released from custody in 1991 after serving five months at the minimum-security camp.	Major League Baseball player and record holder for career hits; convicted of filing false tax returns in 1990.
Michael Rudkin	17133-014		Beaten to death while incarcerated at USP Terre Haute	Former correction officer at FCI Danbury in Connecticut; sentenced to prison in 2008 for having sex with an inmate; convicted in 2010 of trying to hire a hitman to kill the inmate, his ex-wife, his ex-wife's boyfriend and a federal agent while incarcerated at USP Coleman in Florida.
Christopher Cantwell	00991-509		Served a three-year sentence; released on December 19, 2022	White Supremacist known as the Crying Nazi, convicted in 2021 for threatening a man if he didn't give him information about a rival group.
Scott Schweickert	42916-018		Serving 40 years' imprisonment.	Steven Lorenzo's accomplice; Convicted for distributing GHB to commit violence against Michael Wachholtz. He was also convicted of state murder charges and sentenced to life in prison in Florida for the 2003 murders of Jason Galehouse and Michael Wachholtz.
Andrew Stepanian	26399-050		Released from custody in 2009 after serving a two-year sentence.	Member of Stop Huntingdon Animal Cruelty, which aims to shut down an animal testing laboratory run by Huntingdon Life Sciences; convicted of using the Internet to incite violence against company executives.
Garrett Brock Trapnell	72021-158		Deceased; died of natural causes in 1993 while serving a life sentence.	Convicted in 1973 of air piracy for hijacking TWA Flight 2 and threatening to ram the plane into the terminal of JFK Airport unless he received a ransom.
Matthew F. Hale	15177-424		Serving a 40-year sentence; scheduled for release on April 2, 2037.	Neo-Nazi leader of the World Church of the Creator. Convicted in 2005 for soliciting an undercover FBI informant to kill federal judge Joan Humphrey Lefkow after she ruled against him in a copyright case and ordered the name of his church to be changed. He was transferred into USP Marion from ADX Florence in July 2020.
Robert Lee Willie	02724-010		Executed in Louisiana on December 28, 1984.	Serial killer; pleaded guilty along with Joseph Jesse Vaccaro in 1980 to kidnapping a young couple in Louisiana, repeatedly raping the female victim. The two were also convicted of an unrelated state murder charge. Willie was executed in 1984 and Vaccaro was sentenced to life in prison.
Walter Bond	37096-013		Not in BOP custody. Scheduled for release on March 26, 2024.	Sentenced to serve 60 months (five years) in federal prison for use of fire to destroy Sheepskin Factory in 2011. After the fire, Bond posted a message on the Internet taking responsibility for the Sheepskin Factory fire. At the end of that message he used the nickname "ALF Lone Wolf." In 2011 he was sentenced to another 87 months for additional attacks to be served consecutively.
Daron D. Wint	64292-007		Serving four life sentences.	Perpetrator of the 2015 Washington, D.C., quadruple murder incident.
Daniel Hale	26069-075		Released on July 5, 2024	Sentenced to 45 months in prison in July 2021 after pleading guilty to retaining and transmitting national defense information after disclosing information about the United States' drone warfare program and the terrorist watch list. Transferred to the CMU at Marion in October 2021.

== See also ==
- List of U.S. federal prisons
- Federal Bureau of Prisons
- Incarceration in the United States
