= Norman Carlson =

American correctional officer and businessman (1933–2020)

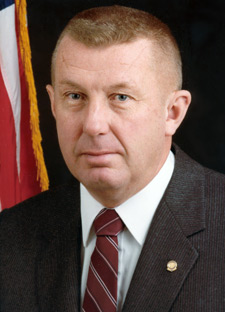

Director of the Federal Bureau of Prisons
- In office 1970–1987
- Preceded by: Myrl E. Alexander
- Succeeded by: J. Michael Quinlan

Personal details
- Born: August 10, 1933 Sioux City, Iowa, U.S.
- Died: August 9, 2020 (aged 86) Phoenix, Arizona, U.S.
- Occupation: Correctional officer, professor

Norman A. Carlson (August 10, 1933 – August 9, 2020) was an American correctional officer and businessman. He was best known for his direction of the Federal Bureau of Prisons from 1970 to 1987 and long-time involvement with this bureau. During his involvement, he served in the United States Penitentiary of Leavenworth, Kansas, and also in the Federal Correctional Institution of Ashland, Kentucky. He was president of the American Correctional Association from 1978 to 1980 and was the adjunct professor for the Department of Sociology at the University of Minnesota for 11 years (1987–98). In 1978, he was awarded the Roger W. Jones Award for Executive Leadership for his leadership in the training of federal government managers and executives and in his organizational abilities.

He served as director emeritus of GEO Group, a private prison company based in Boca Raton, Florida.

Carlson died on August 9, 2020, at a hospital in Phoenix, Arizona, from lymphoma, aged 86.
