= Sport =

Forms of competitive activity, usually physical

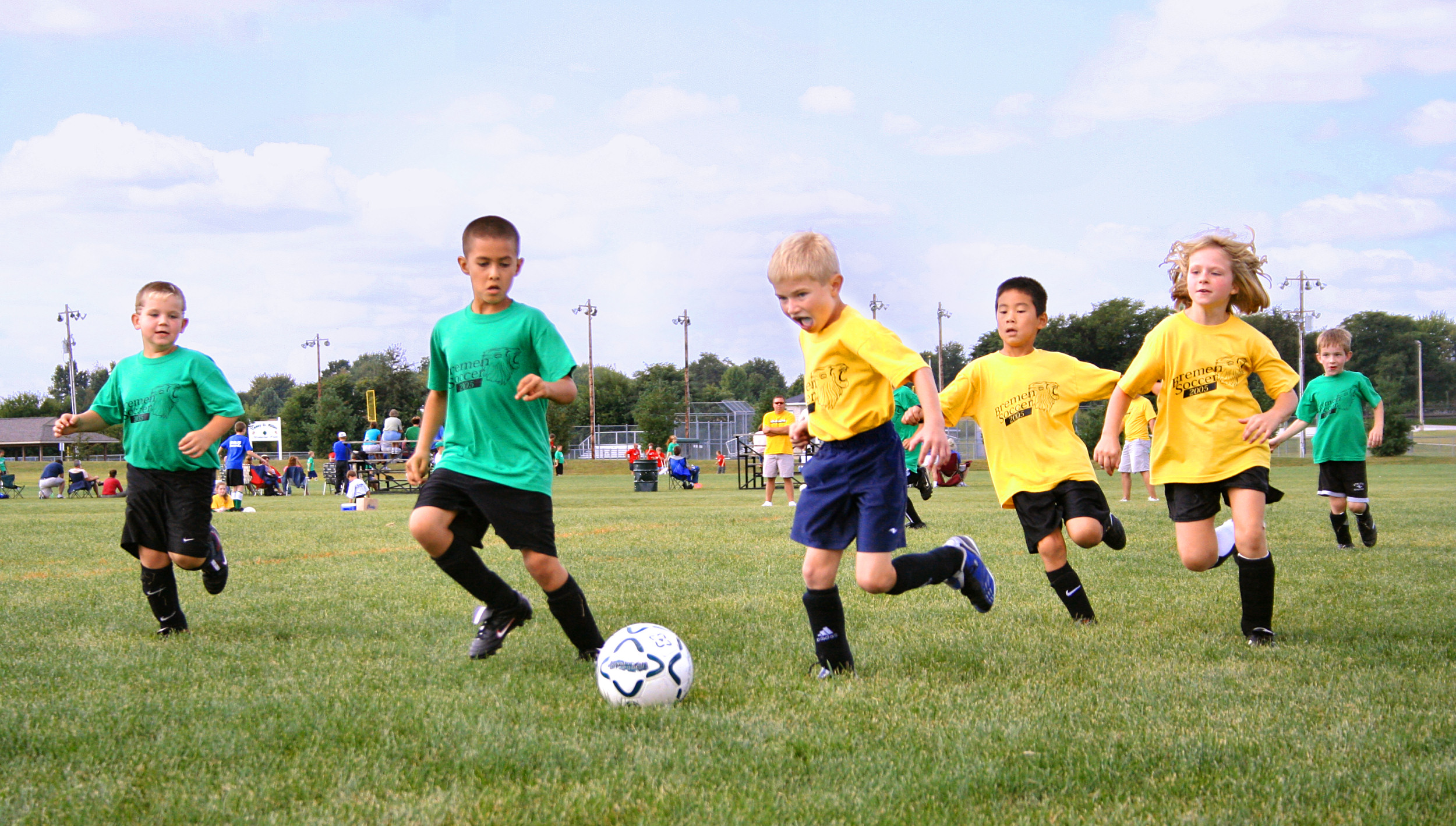
Sport in childhood. Association football, shown above, is a team sport which also provides opportunities to nurture physical fitness and social interaction skills.

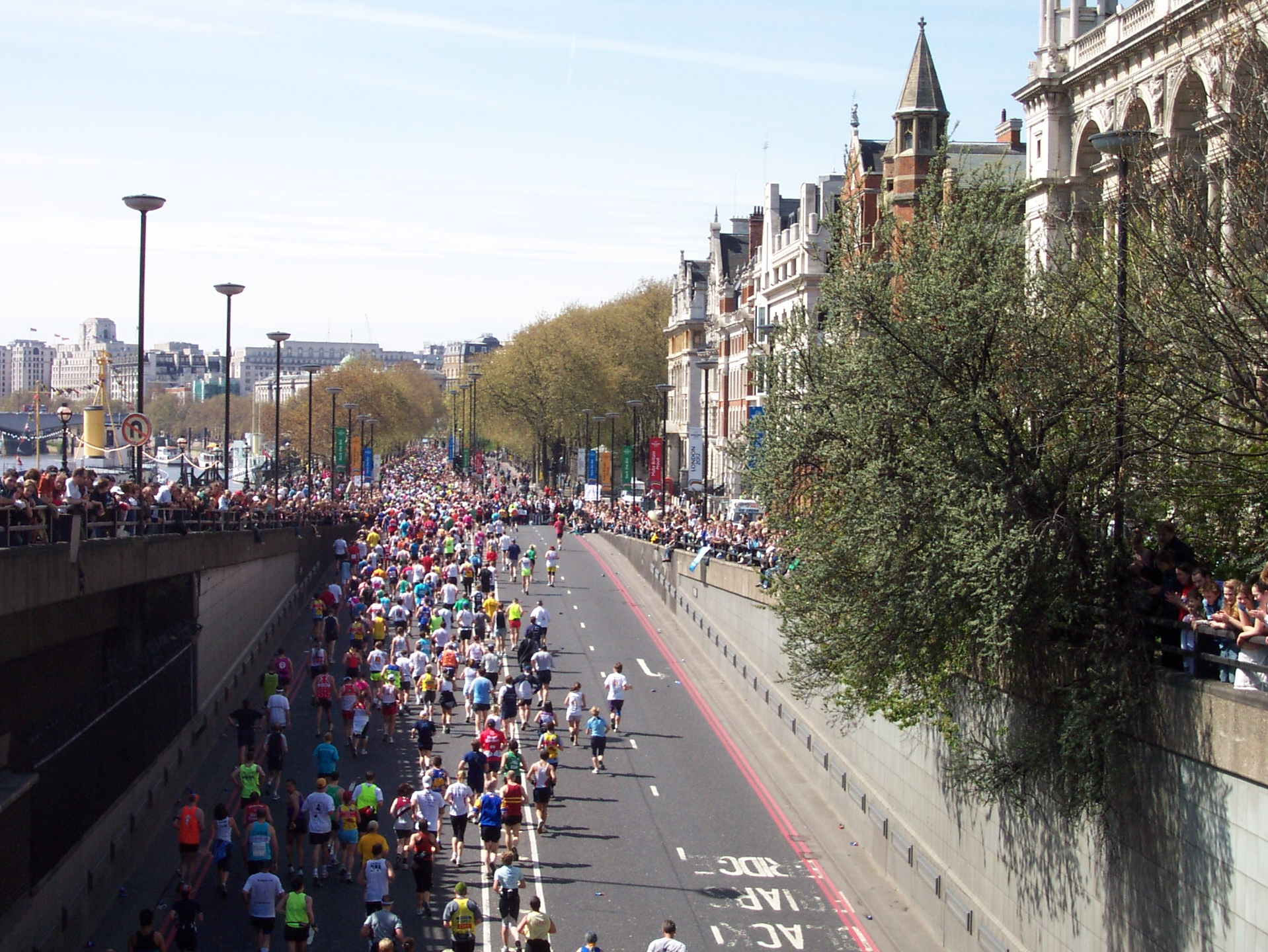
The 2005 London Marathon: running races, in their various specialties, represent the oldest and most traditional form of sport.

A sport is a physical activity or game, often competitive and organised, that maintains or improves physical ability and skills. Sport may provide enjoyment to participants and entertainment to spectators. The number of participants in a particular sport can vary from hundreds of people to a single individual.

Physical activity is associated with various aspects of health and longevity. Higher levels of physical activity are associated with a lower risk of all-cause mortality and mortality from cardiovascular disease, ischemic stroke, and heart failure. Physical activity is also associated with reductions in symptoms of depression, anxiety, and psychological distress. In particular, aerobic exercise, yoga, and multimodal exercise have been found to be effective in reducing symptoms of postpartum depression.

Sport competitions may use a team or single person format, and may be open, allowing a broad range of participants, or closed, restricting participation to specific groups or those invited. Competitions may allow a "tie" or "draw", in which there is no single winner; others provide tie-breaking methods to ensure there is only one winner. They also may be arranged in a tournament format, producing a champion. Many sports leagues make an annual champion by arranging games in a regular sports season, followed in some cases by playoffs.

Sport is generally recognised as system of activities based in physical athleticism or physical dexterity, with major competitions admitting only sports meeting this definition. Some organisations, such as the Council of Europe, preclude activities without any physical element from classification as sports. However, a number of competitive, but non-physical, activities claim recognition as mind sports. The International Olympic Committee who oversee the Olympic Games recognises both chess and bridge as sports. SportAccord, the international sports federation association, recognises five non-physical sports: chess, bridge, draughts, Go and xiangqi. However, they limit the number of mind games which can be admitted as sports. Sport is usually governed by a set of rules or customs, which serve to ensure fair competition. Winning can be determined by physical events such as scoring goals or crossing a line first. It can also be determined by judges who are scoring elements of the sporting performance, including objective or subjective measures such as technical performance or artistic impression.

Records of performance are often kept, and for popular sports, this information may be widely announced or reported in sport news. Sport is also a major source of entertainment for non-participants, with spectator sport drawing large crowds to sport venues, and reaching wider audiences through broadcasting. Sport betting is in some cases severely regulated, and in others integral to the sport.

According to A.T. Kearney, a consultancy, the global sporting industry is worth up to $620 billion as of 2013. The world's most accessible and practised sport is running, while association football is the most popular spectator sport.

== Meaning and usage ==
=== Etymology ===
The word "sport" comes from the Old French desport meaning "leisure", with the oldest definition in English from around 1300 being "anything humans find amusing or entertaining".

Other meanings include gambling and events staged for the purpose of gambling; hunting; and games and diversions, including ones that require exercise. Roget's defines the noun sport as an "activity engaged in for relaxation and amusement" with synonyms including diversion and recreation.

=== Nomenclature ===
The singular term "sport" is used in most English dialects to describe the overall concept, e.g. "children taking part in sport", with "sports" used to describe multiple activities, e.g. "football and rugby are the most popular sports in England". American English uses "sports" for both senses.

=== Definition ===
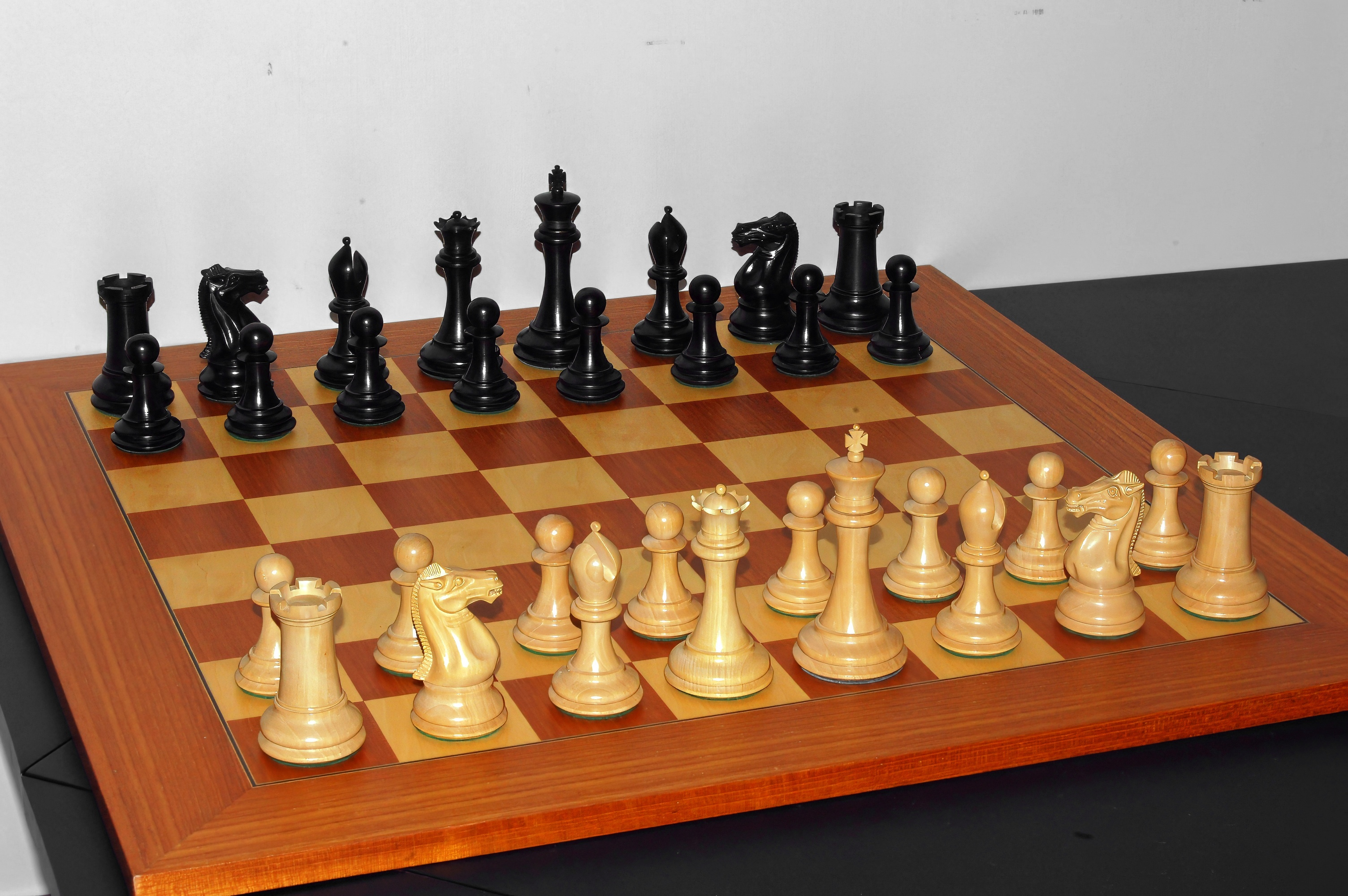
The International Olympic Committee recognises some board games as sports, including chess.

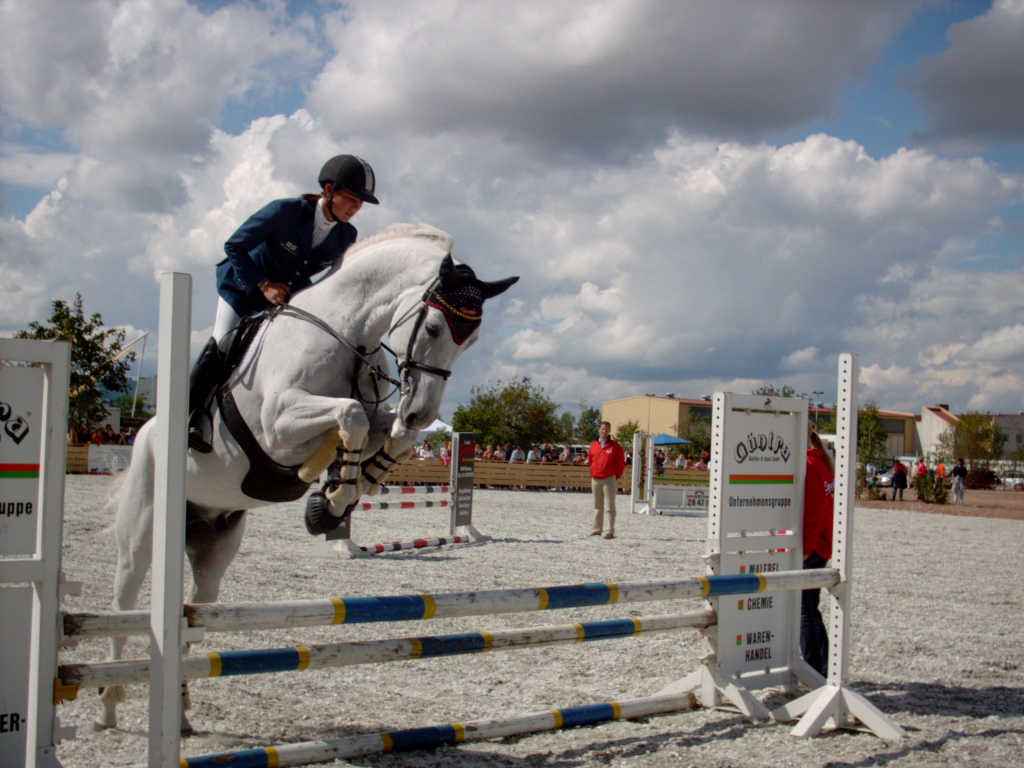
Show jumping, an equestrian sport

The precise definition of what differentiates a sport from other leisure activities varies between sources. The closest to an international agreement on a definition is provided by the Global Association of International Sports Federations (GAISF), which is the association for all the largest international sports federations (including association football, athletics, cycling, tennis, equestrian sports, and more), and is therefore the de facto representative of international sport.

GAISF uses the following criteria, determining that a sport should:

- Have an element of competition
- Be in no way harmful to any living creature
- Not rely on equipment provided by a single supplier (excluding proprietary games such as arena football)
- Not rely on any "luck" element specifically designed into the sport.

They also recognise that sport can be primarily physical (such as rugby or athletics), primarily mind (such as chess or Go), predominantly motorised (such as Formula 1 or powerboating), primarily co-ordination and dexterity (such as snooker and other cue sports), or primarily animal-supported (such as equestrian sport).

The inclusion of mind sports within sport definitions has not been universally accepted, leading to legal challenges from governing bodies in regards to being denied funding available to sports. Whilst GAISF recognises a small number of mind sports, it is not open to admitting any further mind sports.

There has been an increase in the application of the term "sport" to a wider set of non-physical challenges such as video games, also called esports (from "electronic sports"), especially due to the large scale of participation and organised competition, but these are not widely recognised by mainstream sports organisations. According to Council of Europe, European Sports Charter, article 2.i, "'Sport' means all forms of physical activity which, through casual or organised participation, aim at expressing or improving physical fitness and mental well-being, forming social relationships or obtaining results in competition at all levels."

=== Competition ===
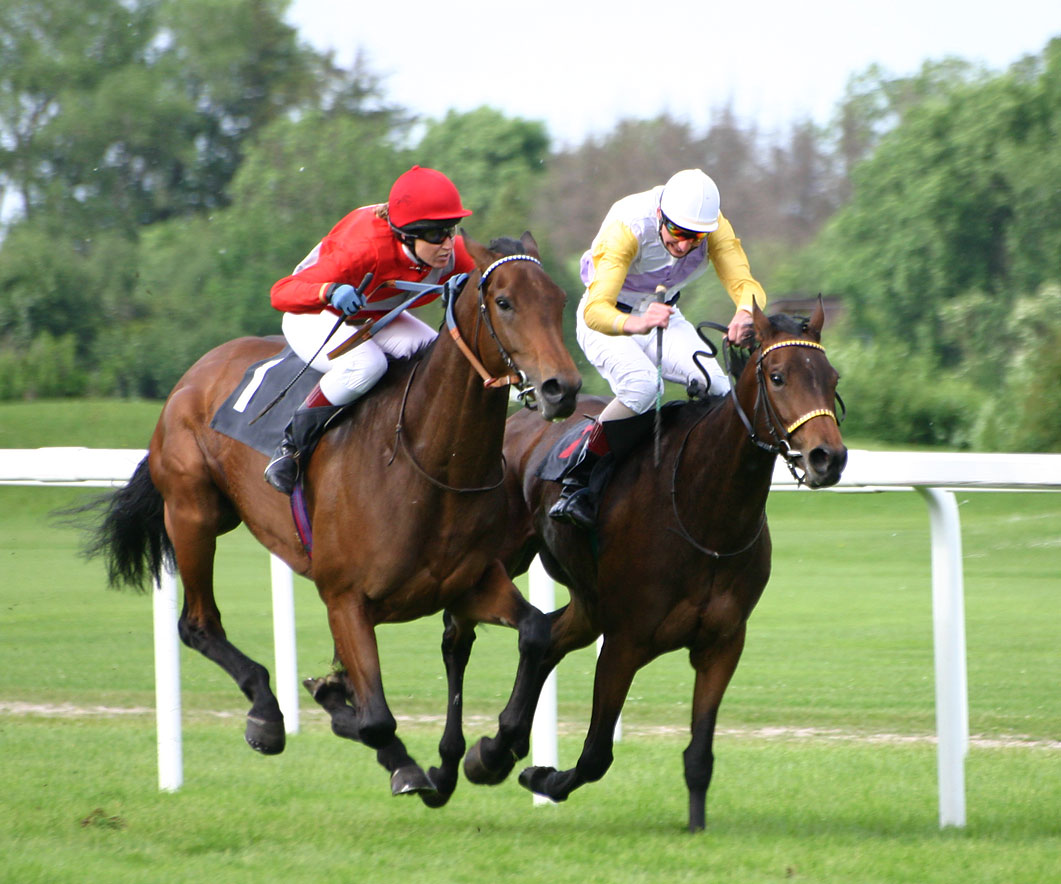
Horse racing

There are opposing views on the necessity of competition as a defining element of a sport, with almost all professional sports involving competition, and governing bodies requiring competition as a prerequisite of recognition by the International Olympic Committee (IOC) or GAISF.

Other bodies advocate widening the definition of sport to include all forms of physical activity, not only organised or competitive events. For instance, the Council of Europe's Sports Charter defines "sport" as: "all forms of physical activity which, through casual or organised participation, are aimed at maintaining or improving physical fitness and mental well-being, forming social relationships or obtaining results in competition at all levels", explicitly encompassing recreational exercise undertaken purely for fun.

To widen participation, and reduce the impact of losing on less able participants, there has been an introduction of non-competitive physical activity to traditionally competitive events such as school sports days, although moves like this can be controversial.

In competitive events, participants are graded or classified based on their "result" and often divided into groups of comparable performance, e.g. gender, weight and age. The measurement of the result may be objective or subjective, and corrected with "handicaps" or penalties. In a race, for example, the time to complete the course is an objective measurement. In gymnastics or diving the result is decided by judges, and therefore subjective. There are shades of judging between boxing and mixed martial arts, where if neither competitor secures a victory before the time limit, the outcome is determined by judges' scorecards. In boxing, three judges independently score each round, based on criteria such as clean punching, effective aggression, ring generalship and defence.

== History ==
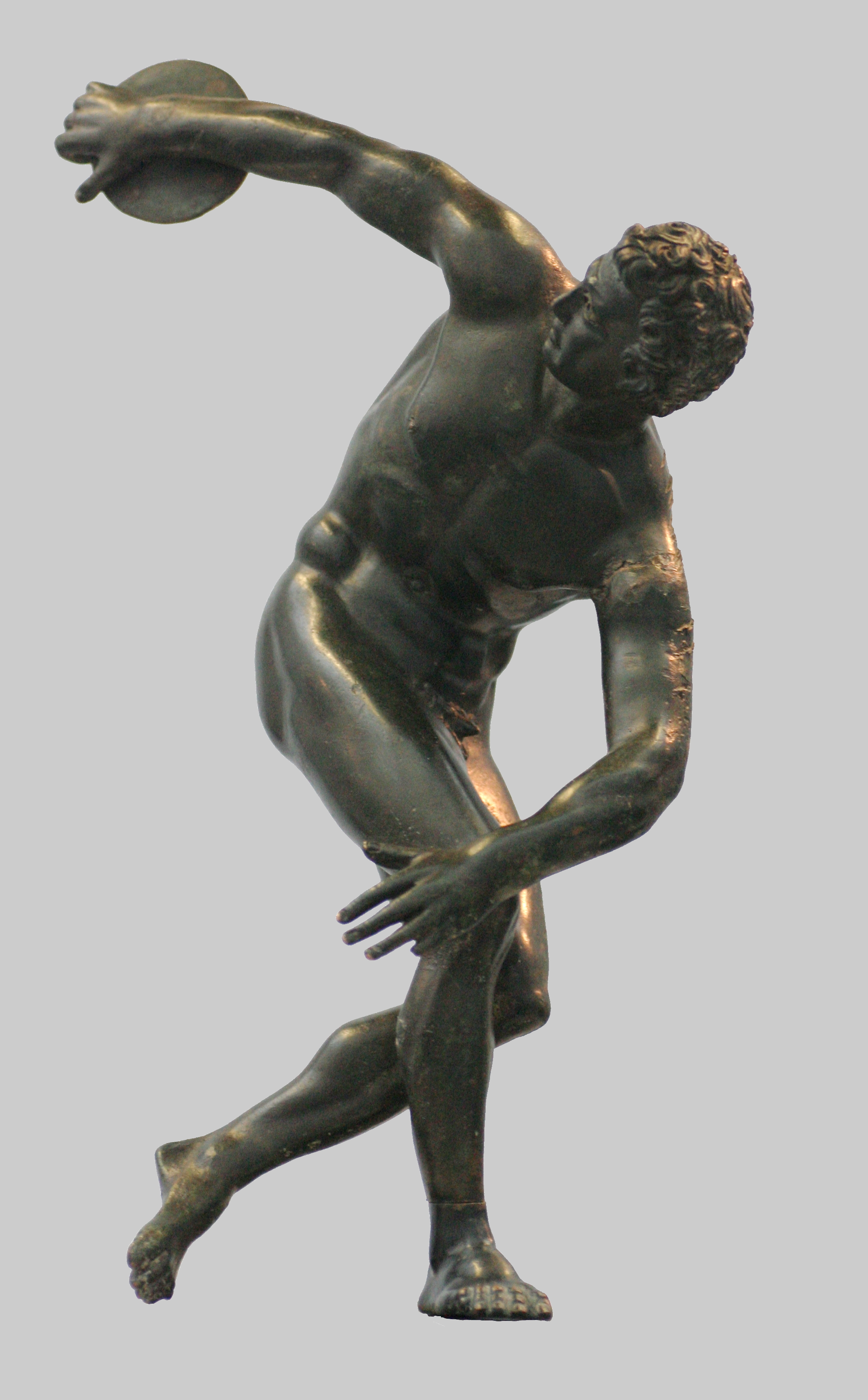
Roman bronze reduction of Myron's Discobolos, 2nd century AD

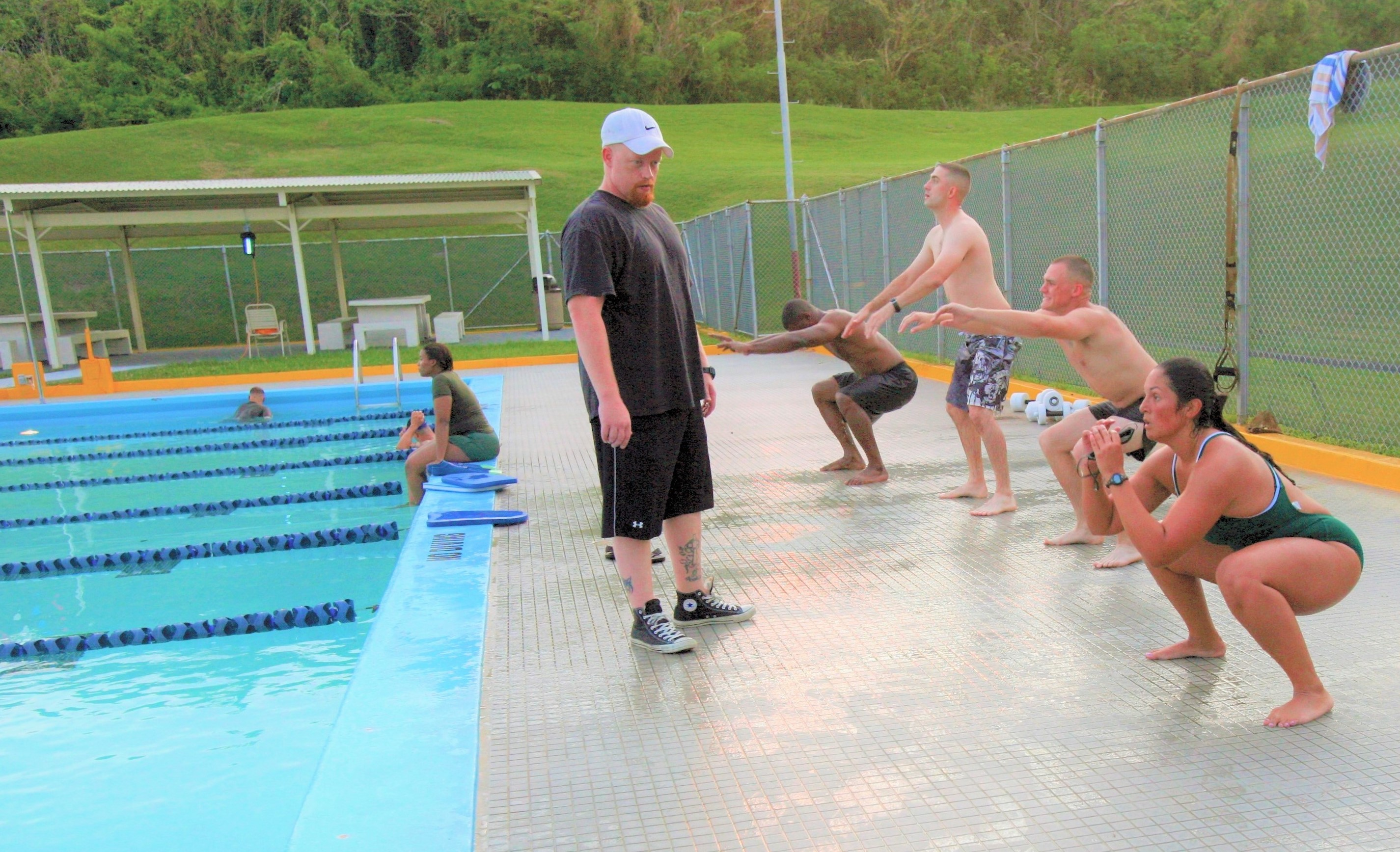
Swimmers perform squats as warm-up exercise prior to entering the pool in a U.S. military base, 2011.

Artifacts and structures suggest sport in China as early as 2000 BC. Gymnastics appears to have been popular in China's ancient past. Monuments to the Pharaohs indicate that a number of sports, including swimming and fishing, were well-developed and regulated several thousands of years ago in ancient Egypt. Other Egyptian sports included javelin throwing, high jump, and wrestling. Ancient Persian sports such as the traditional Iranian martial art of Zoorkhaneh had a close connection to warfare skills. Among other sports that originated in ancient Persia are polo and jousting. Various traditional games of India such as Kho kho and Kabaddi have been played for thousands of years. The kabaddi was played potentially as a preparation for hunting.

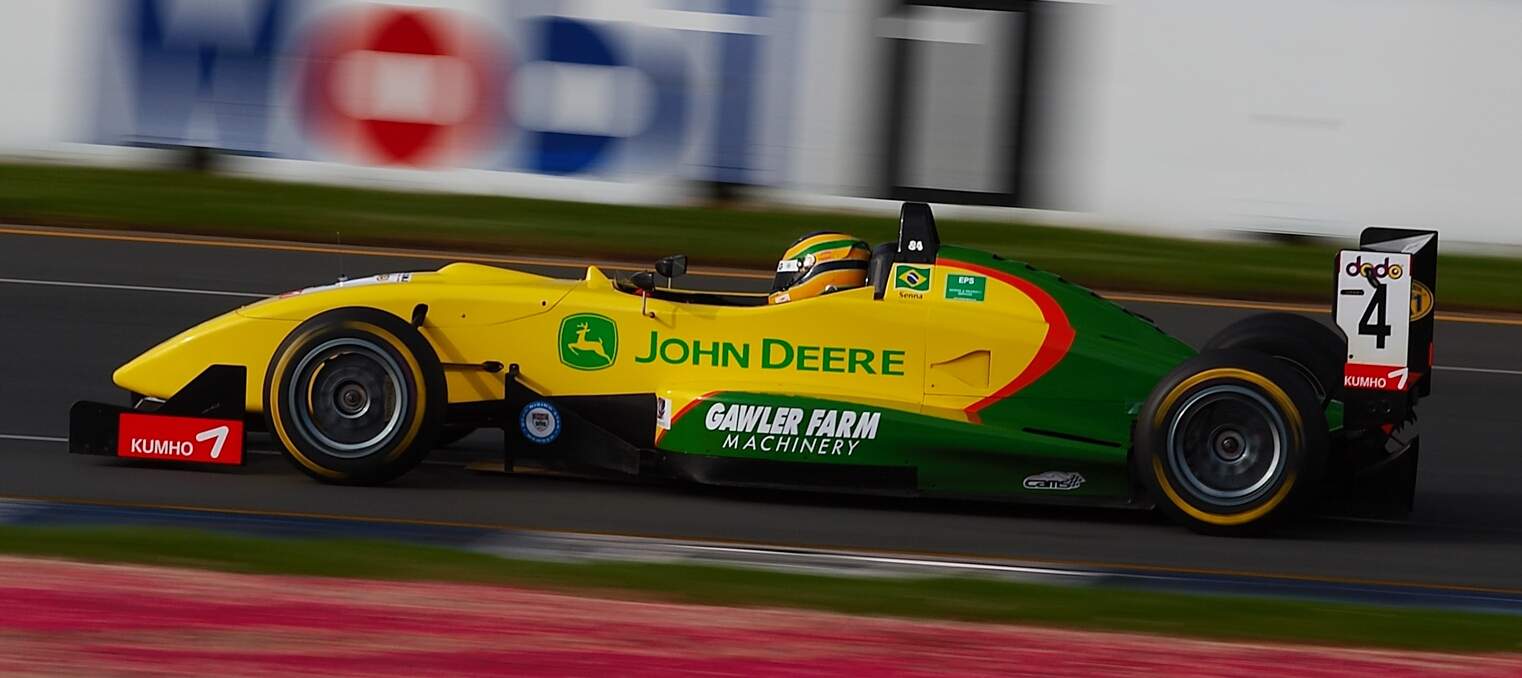
Motorised sports have appeared since the advent of the modern age.

A wide range of sports were already established by the time of Ancient Greece and the military culture and the development of sport in Greece influenced one another considerably. Sport became such a prominent part of their culture that the Greeks created the Olympic Games, which in ancient times were held every four years in a small village in the Peloponnesus called Olympia.

Sports have been increasingly organised and regulated from the time of the ancient Olympics up to the present century. Industrialisation has brought motorised transportation and increased leisure time, letting people attend and follow spectator sports and participate in athletic activities. These trends continued with the advent of mass media and global communication. Professionalism became prevalent, further adding to the increase in sport's popularity, as sports fans followed the exploits of professional athletes – all while enjoying the exercise and competition associated with amateur participation in sports. Since the turn of the 21st century, there has been increasing debate about whether transgender sports people should be able to participate in sport events that conform with their post-transition gender identity.

== Fair play ==
=== Sportsmanship ===
Sportsmanship is an attitude that strives for fair play, courtesy toward teammates and opponents, ethical behaviour and integrity, and grace in victory or defeat.

Sportsmanship expresses an aspiration or ethos that the activity will be enjoyed for its own sake. The well-known sentiment by sports journalist Grantland Rice, that it is "it's not whether you win or lose, but how you play the game," and the modern Olympic creed expressed by its founder Pierre de Coubertin: "The most important thing in the Olympic Games is not to win but to take part," are typical expressions of this sentiment.

=== Cheating ===
Key principles of sport include that the result should not be predetermined, and all participants must have an equal opportunity to win. Rules and regulations are established by governing bodies to ensure fair play and integrity. However, participants sometimes breach these rules to gain an unfair advantage.

Participants may cheat to increase their chances of winning, secure financial gain or other benefit. The prevalence of gambling on sporting outcomes creates incentives for match fixing, in which one or more participants collude to predetermine results rather than compete honestly.

=== Doping and drugs ===
The competitive nature of sport encourages some participants to attempt to enhance their performance through medicines, or other means such as increasing the volume of blood in their bodies through artificial means.

All sports recognised by the IOC, or SportAccord, are required to implement a testing programme, looking for a list of banned drugs, with suspensions or bans being placed on participants who test positive for banned substances.

=== Violence ===
Violence in sports involves crossing the line between fair competition and intentional aggressive violence. Athletes, coaches, fans, and parents sometimes unleash violent behaviour on people or property, in misguided shows of loyalty, dominance, anger, or celebration. Rioting or hooliganism by fans in particular is a problem at some national and international sporting contests.

== Participation ==
=== Gender participation ===
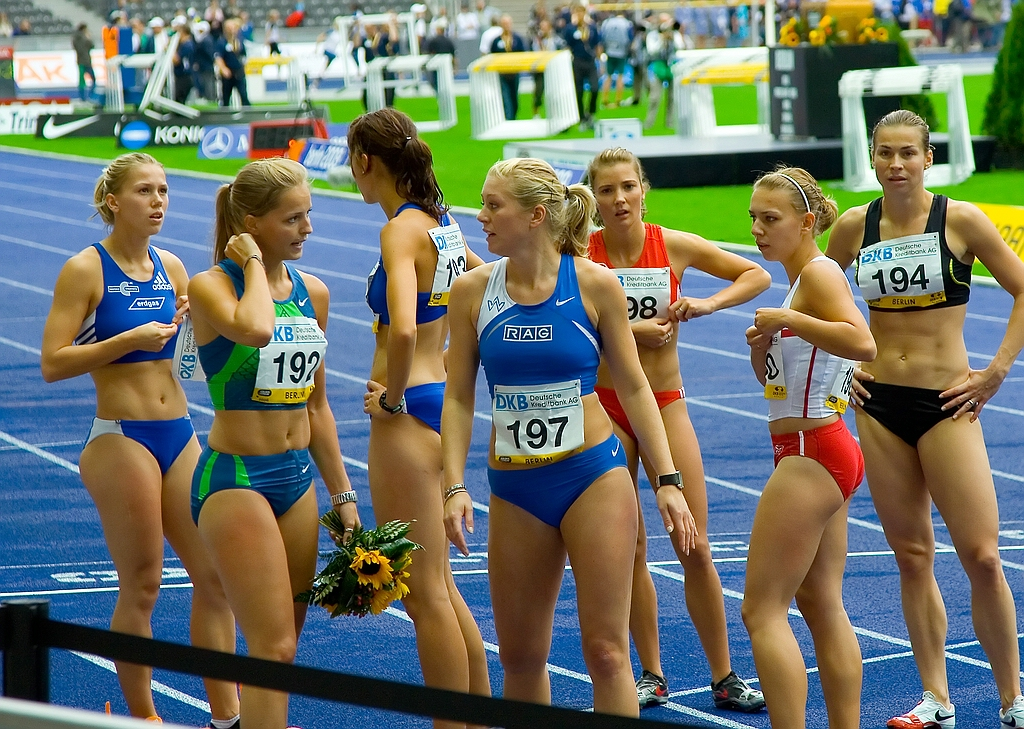
International level female athletes at ISTAF Berlin, 2006

Female participation in sports has risen alongside expanded opportunities and growing recognition of the benefits of athletic activity for child development and physical fitness. Despite these gains, a gender gap persists. At Olympic level, women accounted for 49% at Tokyo 2020, reaching full 50 % parity at Paris 2024. But global surveys report only 20% of women versus 31% of men participate in sporting activity monthly, and the World Health Organization notes women are 5 percentage points less likely than men to meet recommended activity guidelines.

Certain sports are mixed-sex, allowing, or even requiring, men and women to play on the same team. One example of this is Baseball5, which is the first mixed-gender sport to be admitted to the Olympics.

=== Youth participation ===
Youth sport presents children with opportunities for fun, socialisation, forming peer relationships, physical fitness, and athletic scholarships. Activists for education and the war on drugs encourage youth sport as a means to increase educational participation and to fight the illegal drug trade. According to the Center for Injury Research and Policy at Nationwide Children's Hospital, the biggest risk for youth sport is death or serious injury including concussion. These risks come from running, basketball, association football, volleyball, gridiron, gymnastics, and ice hockey. Youth sport in the US is a $15 billion industry including equipment up to private coaching.

=== Disabled participation ===
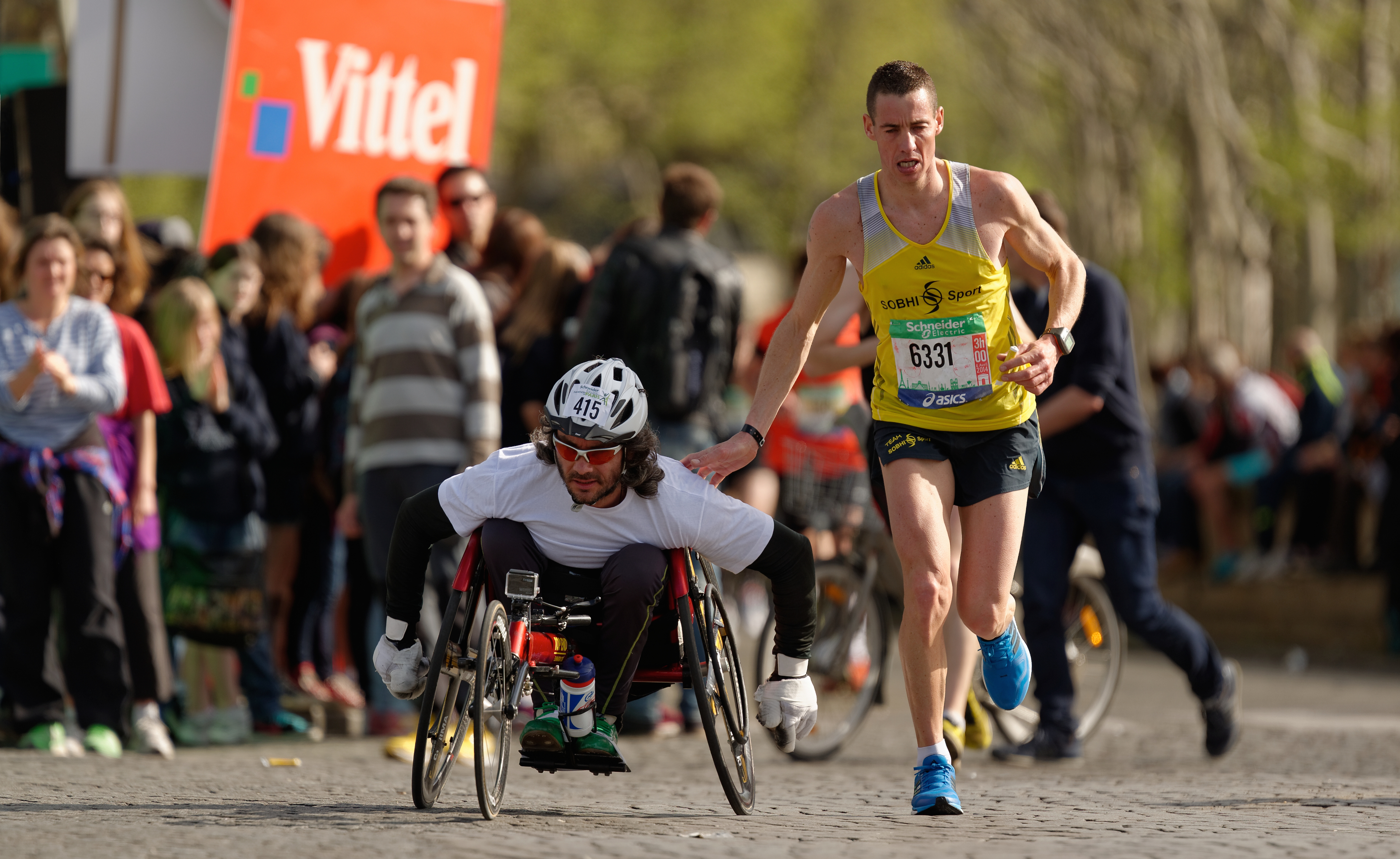
A runner gives a friendly tap on the shoulder to a wheelchair racer during the Marathon International de Paris (Paris Marathon) in 2014.

Disabled or adaptive sports are played by people with a disability, including physical and intellectual disabilities. As many of these are based on existing sports modified to meet the needs of people with a disability, they are sometimes referred to as adapted sports. However, not all disabled sports are adapted; several that have been specifically created for people with a disability have no equivalent in able-bodied sports, such as goalball and boccia.

=== Older participation ===
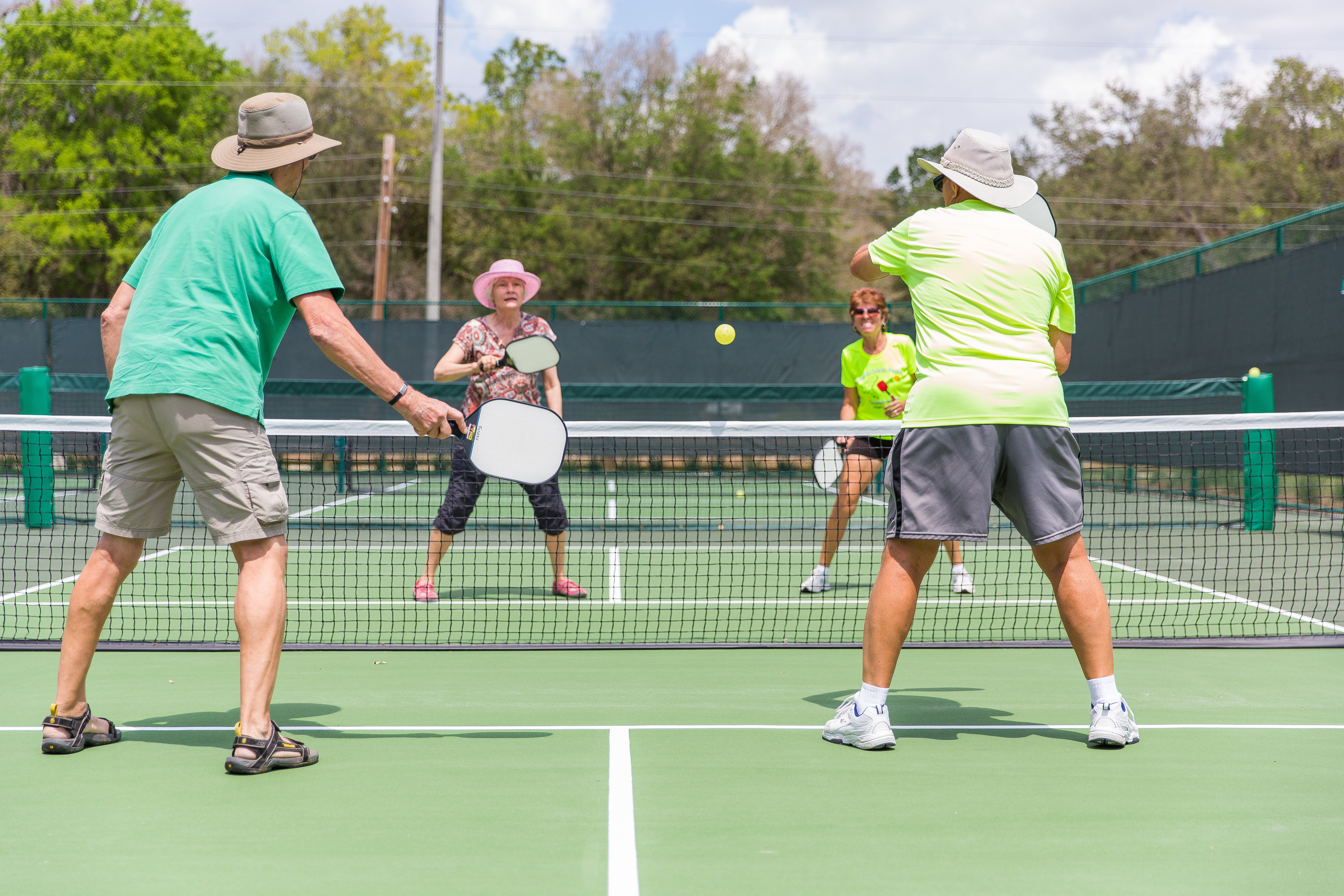
Pickleball is a sport particularly attractive to older players.

Masters sport, senior sport, or veteran sport is an age category of sport, that usually contains age groups of those 35 and older. It may concern unaltered or adapted sport activities, with and without competitions.

Competitions

- World Masters Games organised since 1985 every four years.
- European Masters Games organised for the first time in 2008 and then since 2011 every four years.
- Senior Olympics (Senior Games)
- USATF Masters Outdoor Championships began 1968
- USATF Masters Indoor Championships began 1975
- World Masters Athletics Championships began 1975

=== Spectator involvement ===
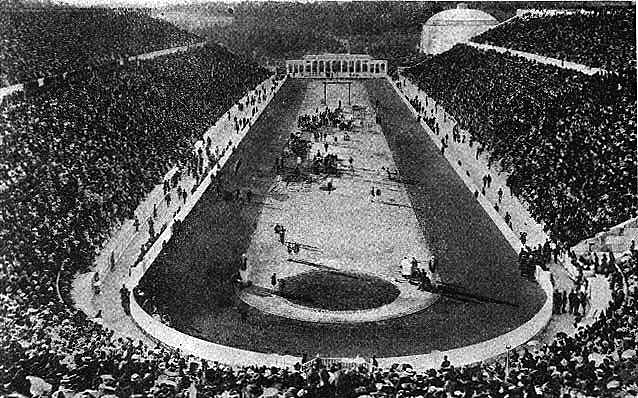
Spectators at the 1906 unofficial Olympic Games

The competition element of sport, along with the aesthetic appeal of some disciplines, has resulted in the phenomenon of spectator sport. Amateur and professional sports attract audiences in person at venues and via broadcast media—radio, television and internet streaming—each of which may levy fees such as entrance tickets or pay-per-view subscriptions. Sports leagues and tournaments provide the primary organisational frameworks for regular competition among teams or individual athletes.

High-profile events command vast audiences, driving lucrative media-rights deals. The 2006 FIFA World Cup final drew over 700 million viewers worldwide, and the 2011 Cricket World Cup final was watched by approximately 135 million viewers in India alone. In the US, the Super Bowl ranks as the most-watched annual television broadcast, with Super Bowl XLIX in 2015 averaging 114 million viewers. Super Bowl Sunday is considered an unofficial national holiday, and in 2015 a 30-second advertising spot sold for approximately US$4.5 million.

== Amateur and professional ==
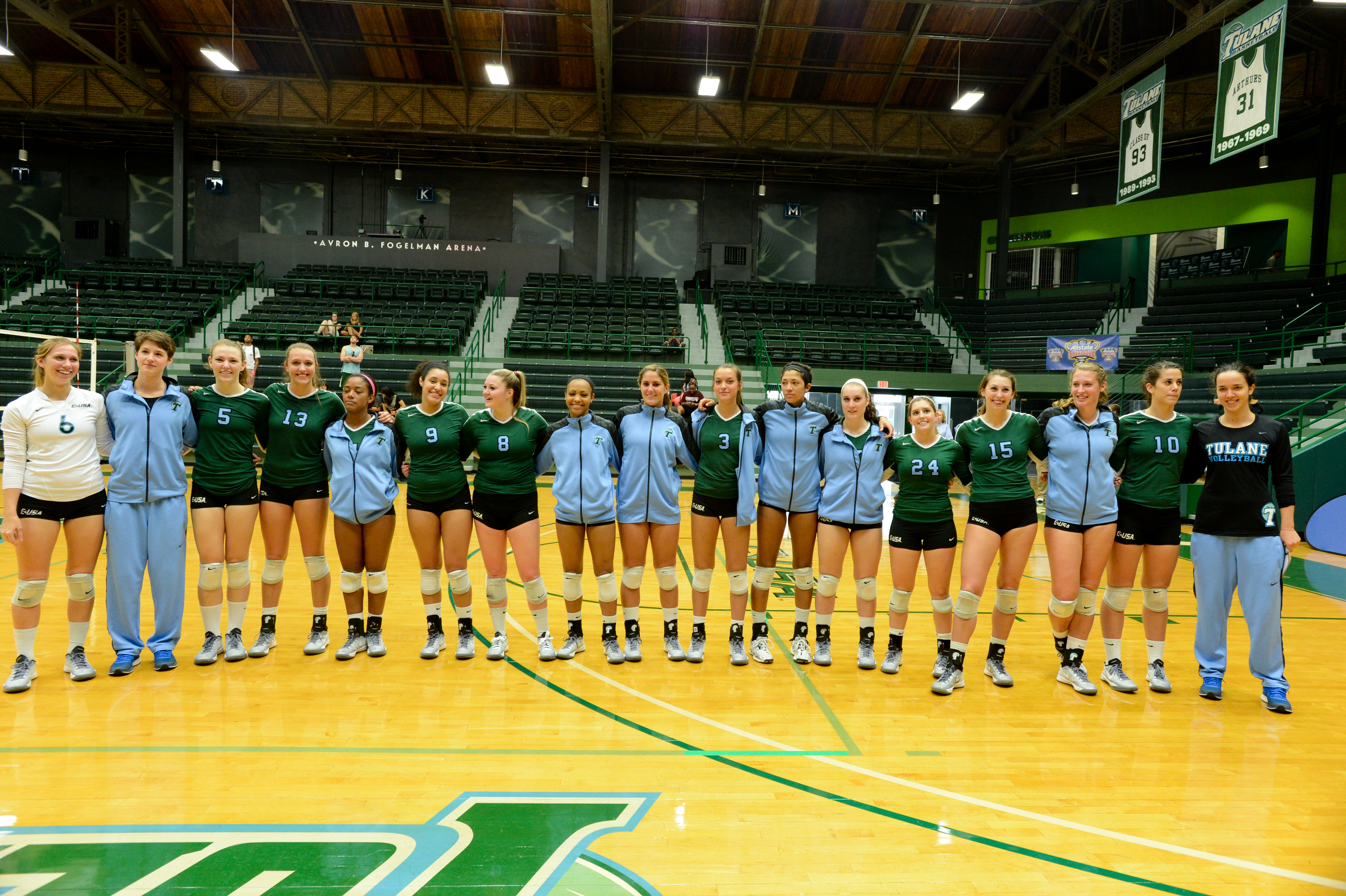
Women's volleyball team of a U.S. university

Sport can be undertaken on an amateur, professional or semi-professional basis, depending on whether participants are incentivised for participation (usually through payment of a wage or salary). Amateur participation in sport at lower levels is often called "grassroots sport".

The popularity of spectator sport as a recreation for non-participants has led to sport becoming a major business in its own right, and this has incentivised a high paying professional sport culture, where high performing participants are rewarded with pay far in excess of average wages, which can run into millions of dollars.

Some sports, or individual competitions within a sport, retain a policy of allowing only amateur sport. The Olympic Games started with a principle of amateur competition with those who practised a sport professionally considered to have an unfair advantage over those who practised it merely as a hobby. From 1971, Olympic athletes were allowed to receive compensation and sponsorship, and from 1986, the IOC decided to make all professional athletes eligible for the Olympics, with the exceptions of boxing, and wrestling.

== Technology ==
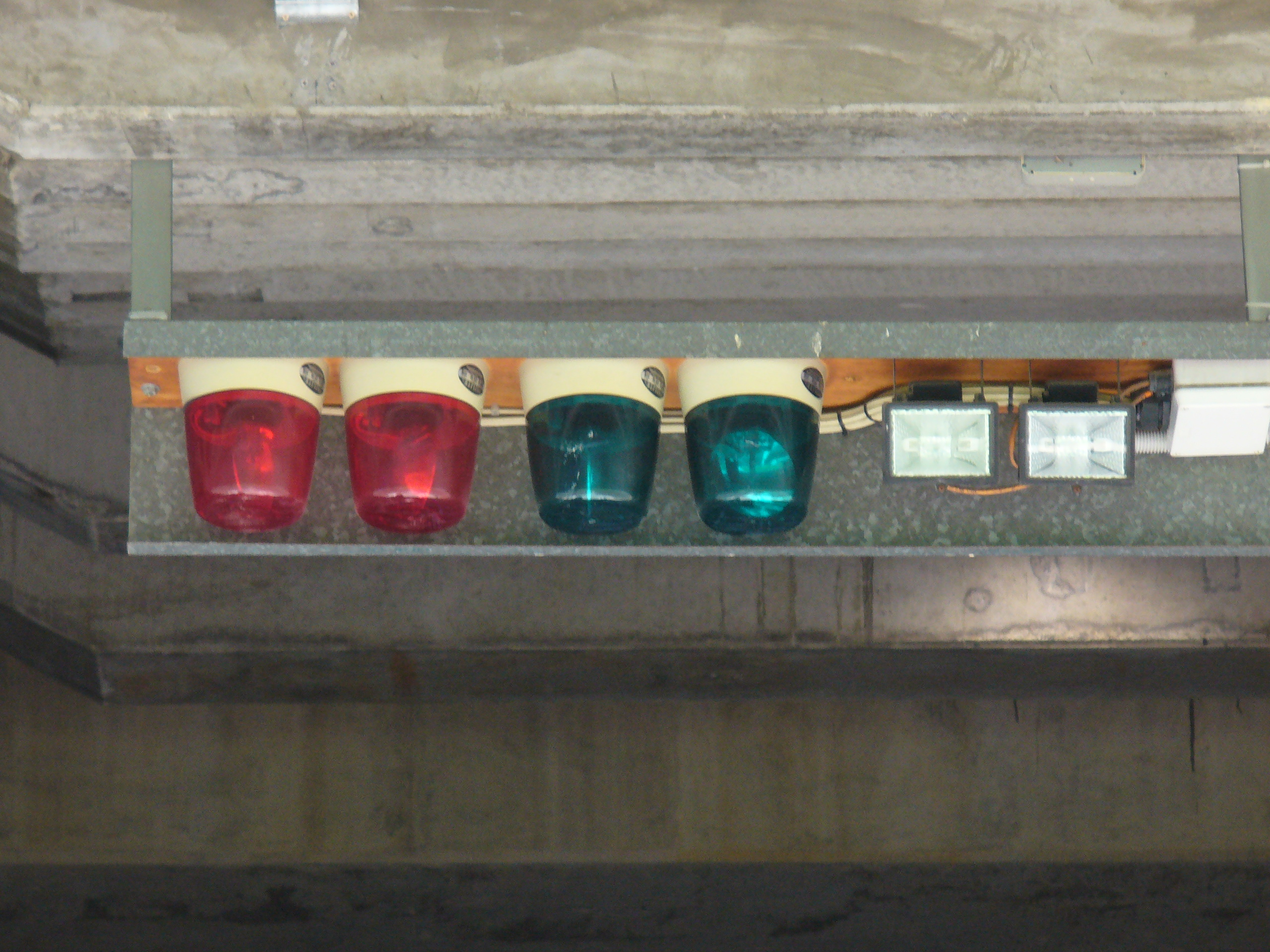
These lights at the Melbourne Cricket Ground indicate the decision the third umpire makes following a review.

Technology plays an important part in modern sport. It is a necessary part of some sports (such as motorsport), and it is used in others to improve performance. Some sports also use it to allow off-field decision making.

Sports science can be applied to areas including athlete performance, such as the use of video analysis to fine-tune technique, or to equipment, such as improved running shoes or competitive swimwear. Sports engineering emerged as a discipline in 1998 with an increasing focus not just on materials design but also the use of technology in sport, from analytics and big data to wearable technology. In order to control the impact of technology on fair play, governing bodies frequently have specific rules that are set to control the impact of technical advantage between participants. For example, in 2010, full-body, non-textile swimsuits were banned by FINA, as they were enhancing swimmers' performances.

The increase in technology has also allowed many decisions in sports matches to be taken, or reviewed, off-field, with another official using instant replays to make decisions. In some sports, players can now challenge decisions made by officials. In Association football, goal-line technology makes decisions on whether a ball has crossed the goal line or not. The technology is not compulsory, but was used in the 2014 FIFA World Cup in Brazil, and the 2015 FIFA Women's World Cup in Canada, as well as in the Premier League from 2013–14, and the Bundesliga from 2015–16. In the NFL, a referee can ask for a review from the replay booth, or a head coach can issue a challenge to review the play using replays. The final decision rests with the referee. A video referee (commonly known as a Television Match Official or TMO) can also use replays to help decision-making in rugby (both league and union). In international cricket, an umpire can ask the Third umpire for a decision, and the third umpire makes the final decision. Since 2008, a decision review system for players to review decisions has been introduced and used in ICC-run tournaments, and optionally in other matches. Depending on the host broadcaster, a number of different technologies are used during an umpire or player review, including instant replays, Hawk-Eye, Hot Spot and Real Time Snickometer. Hawk-Eye is also used in tennis to challenge umpiring decisions.

== Sport and education ==
Research suggests that sports have the capacity to connect youth to positive adult role models and provide positive development opportunities, as well as promote the learning and application of life skills. In recent years the use of sport to reduce crime, as well as to prevent violent extremism and radicalisation, has become more widespread, especially as a tool to improve self-esteem, enhance social bonds and provide participants with a feeling of purpose.

There is no high-quality evidence that shows the effectiveness of interventions to increase sports participation of the community in sports such as mass media campaigns, educational sessions, and policy changes. There is also no high-quality studies that investigate the effect of such interventions in promoting healthy behaviour change in the community.

Educational qualifications are available in sport: for example, sports science is a well-established academic discipline. In the UK, a BTEC National Diploma in Sports Coaching and Development is offered by Pearson Education. There are four qualifications in this family:

- Extended Certificate in Sports Coaching
- Foundation Diploma in Sports Coaching and Development
- Diploma in Sports Coaching and Development
- Extended Diploma in Sports Coaching and Development.

== Sport and physical fitness ==
Sports which involve physical exercise have a positive impact on the fitness levels of participants. In general terms, greater levels of strength, speed, endurance and agility can be achieved by adapting to the demands of the sport. For example, someone may become stronger with greater levels of stamina by wrestling or more agile by playing basketball. Different sports may improve a participant's physical abilities in different ways. The factors of strength, speed, endurance and agility which are used in sport, and improved by it, can also be enhanced by specific training exercises.

The improvements gained from these exercises may then improve the sports person's ability to play the sport. An example of an agility exercise, also known as a drill, is when a person moves along an agility ladder which is placed on the ground. The person jumps up and forwards so that one foot is inside a square of the ladder and one foot outside of it. They then jump up and forwards again so that the foot which is inside and the foot outside the square alternate i.e. left foot in with right foot out, then right foot in with left foot out and so forth moving along the ladder. This helps to improve their general level of agility and because agility is important in basketball also improves their basketball ability. The agility exercises can be tailored so that the actions practiced in them is closer to those used during a game. This means that the form of agility developed is more transferable to actual competition. In the previous example, the rapid movement and placement of the feet develops the quick footwork required in a basketball game.

Sports training programmes involve practicing the sports specific skills of that sport i.e. soccer training may involve repeatedly passing the ball, and improving general physical fitness and ability i.e. running laps around the pitch. Both of theses training focuses are designed to make a person more effective at that sport by improving their ability to meet and overcome the challenges it presents.

=== Recovery ===
Recovery is an essential part of playing sport and improving at it. It allows for the regaining of energy so a person can continue to train or play and for physical adaptions which enhance performance to occur. Adequate recovery also reduces the risk of injury. There are many different ways in which a person can recover and they may be more short term or more long term.

Short term

Immediate recovery is the form of recovery that a person actively performs while training or playing and may include the factors of balance, energy and breath. For example, a tennis player recovers after playing a shot and a runner recovers after completing a step. These small brief acts of recovery allow for the sportsperson to continue to train and compete while avoiding fatigue.

A warm down is a form of active recovery that follows training or playing sport. It involves performing low intensity exercises like jogging or static stretches. This enables a gradual reduction in heart rate, the removal of lactate from the blood stream, and a reduction of muscle stiffness and feelings of fatigue.

Dedicated active recovery sessions may be used if training sessions cause physical strain or during periods of competition. In such sessions low intensity, easy exercise is undertaken. For example, a footballer may go hiking on a free day between two matches. The purpose is to allow the increased blood flow to aid the body’s healing rate, clear lactate and reduce muscle stiffness.

Other post-exercise recovery strategies that are used in sport training regimes include cold water immersion and massage. The purpose is to stimulate recovery by aiding muscle relaxation and alleviating soreness. They may also help to reduce the risk of injury.

Long term

Sleep is an essential element of being ready to play sport and for the necessary physical adaptions, which result in improved proficiency, to occur. It is important that sleep is of high quality and that eight or more hours are achieved each night. If a person does not get enough sleep then they will have less energy for their sport, their performance may suffer, they will be more likely to experience fatigue, and they will have a greater risk of injury. If sleep has been lacking, then the negative effects can be reduced by increasing the length of subsequent sleep periods or by the use of passive rest days.

Proper nutrition from an appropriate balance of fats, carbohydrates and protein is necessary to ensure sufficient energy levels to enable high quality performance and ongoing improvements to ability. A nutritious diet also helps to avoid the occurrence of fatigue during training and competition.

== Politics ==
Benito Mussolini used the 1934 FIFA World Cup, held in Italy, to showcase Fascist Italy. Adolf Hitler used the 1936 Summer Olympics held in Berlin, and the 1936 Winter Olympics held in Garmisch-Partenkirchen, to promote the Nazi ideology of the superiority of the Aryan race, and inferiority of the Jews and other "undesirables". Germany used the Olympics to give off a peaceful image while secretly preparing for war.

When apartheid was official policy in South Africa, many sports people, particularly in rugby union, adopted the conscientious approach that they should not appear in competitive sports there. Some feel this was an effective contribution to the eventual end of apartheid, others feel it may have prolonged and reinforced its worst effects.

In the history of Ireland, Gaelic sports were connected with cultural nationalism. Until the mid-20th century a person could have been banned from playing Gaelic football, hurling, or other sports administered by the Gaelic Athletic Association (GAA) if she/he played or supported Association football, or other games seen to be of British origin. The GAA banned the playing of football and rugby union at Gaelic venues. This ban, also known as Rule 42, is still enforced, but was modified to allow football and rugby to be played in Croke Park while Lansdowne Road was redeveloped into Aviva Stadium. Under Rule 21, the GAA banned members of the British security forces and members of the RUC from playing Gaelic games, but the advent of the Good Friday Agreement in 1998 led to removal of the ban.

Nationalism is often evident in the pursuit of sport or in its reporting: athletes compete in national teams, and commentators or audiences frequently adopt partisan perspectives. On occasion, such tensions erupt into violence among players or spectators, as during the 1969 Football War between El Salvador and Honduras, a conflict sparked by rioting at World Cup qualifiers. Such episodes are viewed as contrary to the fundamental ethos of sport—namely, that it be contested for its own sake and for the enjoyment of participants. Politics and sport tragically intersected at the 1972 Munich Olympics, when Palestinian militants infiltrated the Olympic Village, took Israeli team members hostage, and ultimately killed 11 athletes in what became known as the Munich massacre.

A study of US elections has shown that the result of sports events can affect the results. A study published in the Proceedings of the National Academy of Sciences showed that when the home team wins the game before the election, the incumbent candidates can increase their share of the vote by 1.5%. A loss had the opposite effect, and the effect is greater for higher-profile teams or unexpected wins and losses. When the Washington Commanders win their final game before an election, then the incumbent president is more likely to win, and if they lose, then the opposition candidate is more likely to win; this has become known as the Redskins Rule.

=== As a means of controlling and subduing populations ===
Étienne de La Boétie, in his essay Discourse on Voluntary Servitude describes athletic spectacles as means for tyrants to control their subjects by distracting them.

Do not imagine that there is any bird more easily caught by decoy, nor any fish sooner fixed on the hook by wormy bait, than are all these poor fools neatly tricked into servitude...they let themselves be caught so quickly at the slightest tickling of their fancy. Plays, farces, spectacles, gladiators, strange beasts, medals, pictures, and other such opiates, these were for ancient peoples the bait toward slavery, the price of their liberty, the instruments of tyranny. By these...enticements the ancient dictators so successfully lulled their subjects under the yoke, that the stupefied peoples, fascinated by the pastimes and vain pleasures flashed before their eyes, learned subservience as naïvely...as little children learn to read by looking at bright picture books.

During the British rule of Bengal, British and European sports began to supplant traditional Bengali sports, resulting in a loss of native culture.

In communist controlled East Germany, from the 1970s to 1990, 'an estimated 3,000 unofficial collaborators were used each year in top-level sport, including many football players, fans and referees'. Among the most important reasons for the Stasi setting up this extensive network of collaborators was to prevent athletes escaping to the West, using both methods of surveillance and repression.

== Religious views ==
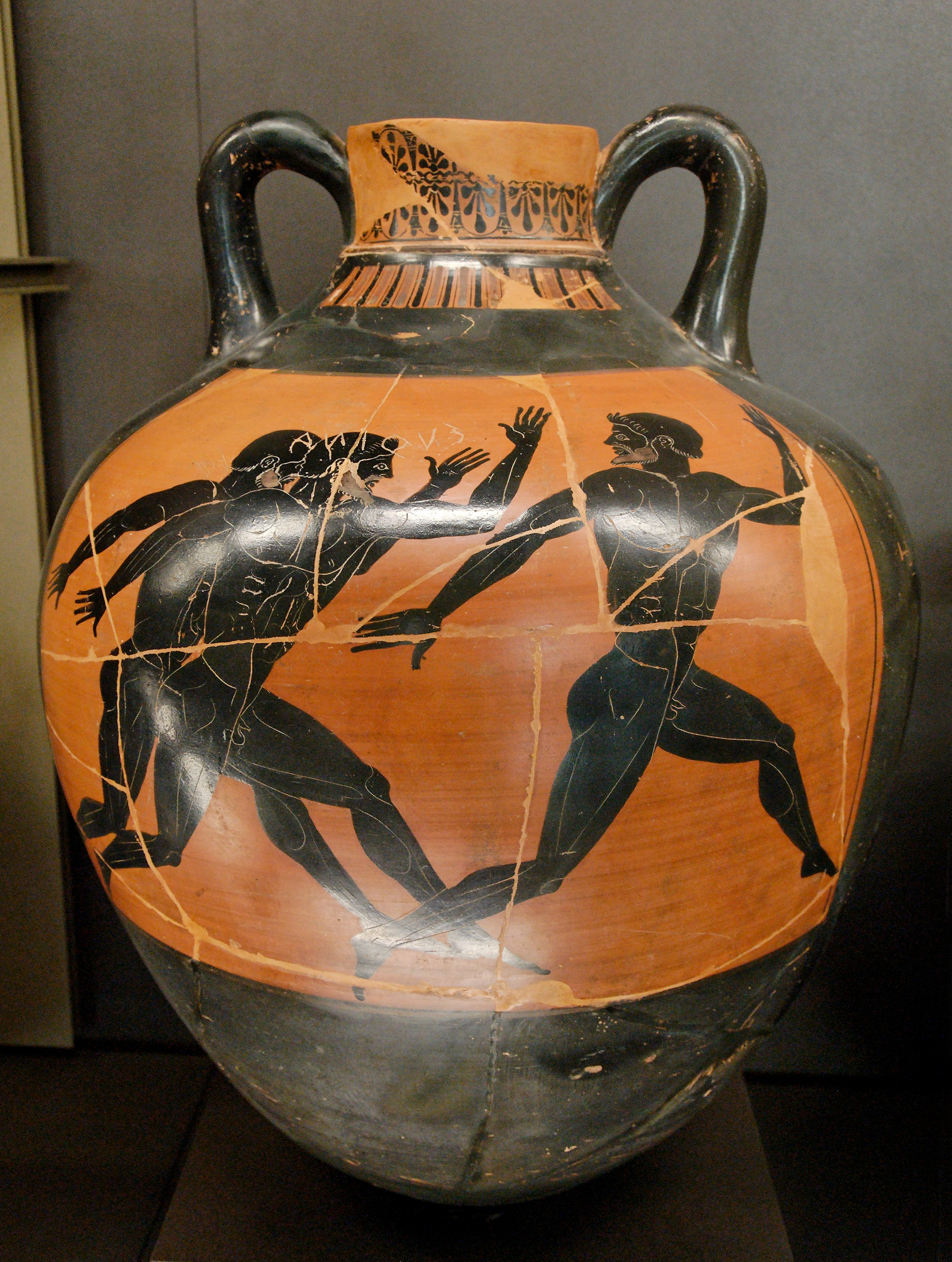
The foot race was one of the events dedicated to Zeus. Panathenaic amphora, Kleophrades painter, c. 500 BC, Louvre museum.

Sport was an important form of worship in Ancient Greek religion. The ancient Olympic Games were held in honour of the head deity, Zeus, and featured various forms of religious dedication to him and other gods. Many Greeks travelled to see the games and the combination of religious pilgrimage and sport served as a way of uniting them as one people.

The practice of athletic competitions has been criticised by some Christian thinkers as a form of idolatry, in which "human beings extol themselves, adore themselves, sacrifice themselves and reward themselves." Sports are seen by these critics as a manifestation of "collective pride" and "national self-deification" in which feats of human power are idolised at the expense of divine worship.

Tertullian condemns the athletic performances of his day, insisting "the entire apparatus of the shows is based upon idolatry." The shows, says Tertullian, excite passions foreign to the calm temperament cultivated by the Christian:

God has enjoined us to deal calmly, gently, quietly, and peacefully with the Holy Spirit, because these things are alone in keeping with the goodness of His nature, with His tenderness and sensitiveness. ... Well, how shall this be made to accord with the shows? For the show always leads to spiritual agitation, since where there is pleasure, there is keenness of feeling giving pleasure its zest; and where there is keenness of feeling, there is rivalry giving in turn its zest to that. Then, too, where you have rivalry, you have rage, bitterness, wrath and grief, with all bad things which flow from them – the whole entirely out of keeping with the religion of Christ.

Christian clerics in the Wesleyan-Holiness movement oppose the viewing of or participation in professional sports, believing that professional sports leagues profane the Sabbath, compete with a Christian's primary commitment to God, exhibit a lack of modesty in the players' and cheerleaders' uniforms, are associated with violence and extensive use of profanity among many players, and encourage gambling, as well as alcohol and other drugs at sporting events, which go against a commitment to teetotalism.

== See also ==
- List of sports
- List of sports attendance figures
- List of professional sports leagues
- Lists of sportspeople
- List of exercise activities
- New media
- Outline of sports

Related topics

- Animals in sport
- Combat sport
- Fan (person)
- Handedness#Sports
- Lawn game
- List of sports terms named after people
- Motorsport
- Multi-sport event
- National sport
- Nationalism and sports
- Penalty card
- Physical education
- Sport in film
- Sport psychology
- Sports club
- Sports commentator
- Sports entertainment
- Sports equipment
- Sports fan
- Sports governing body
- Sports injuries
- Sports league attendances
- Sports marketing
- Sports nutrition
- Sports trainer
- Sportswear
- Sunday sporting events
- Team sport
- Traditional sports and games
- Underwater sports
- Women's sports
- Water sports
- Winter sport
