= RTS =

RTS may refer to:

== Medicine ==
- Rape trauma syndrome, the psychological trauma experienced by a rape victim
- Revised Trauma Score, a system to evaluate injuries secondary to violent trauma
- Rubinstein–Taybi syndrome, a condition characterized by short stature, etc.
- Religious trauma syndrome, a disorder caused by past participation in controlling religious groups

== Radio and television ==
- Royal Television Society, a UK-based society for the discussion of television
- Radio Television of Serbia (Serbian: Radio-televizija Srbije), the national broadcasting company of Serbia
- Radiodiffusion Télévision Sénégalaise, the Senegalese national broadcasting company
- Radiotelevizija Slovenija (RTV SLO), the national broadcaster of Slovenia
- Radio Télévision Suisse, the French-speaking public broadcasting company of Switzerland
- Radio and Television of Slovakia (RTVS), the national broadcasting company of Slovakia
- Radio & Television of Singapore, Mediacorp's name from 1963 to 1980
- RedTeleSistema, a private television station in Ecuador
- SES/RTS, the callsign of a TV station in Loxton, South Australia

== Technology ==
- Return statement, mnemonic in some computer languages (ReTurn from Subroutine)
- Radio teleswitch service, which regulates energy rates via broadcast radio in the UK
- Request to Send (disambiguation), control signals
- Runtime system, an implementation for executing software
- Real Time Snickometer, technology used in cricket
- Real-time strategy, a video gaming genre

== Transportation ==
- Rapid Transit Series, transit buses originally manufactured by General Motors Corporation
- Regional Transit Service, a division of the Rochester-Genesee Regional Transportation Authority
- Gainesville Regional Transit System, the local area transit corporation in Gainesville, Alachua County, Florida, US
- Johor Bahru–Singapore Rapid Transit System, a cross-border metro between Singapore and Malaysia
- Rottnest Island Airport, Australia, IATA code RTS

== Organizations ==
- Russian Trading System, a stock exchange in Russia
- Reclaim the Streets, an organization
- Reformed Theological Seminary, a theological seminary in the US
- Religious Tract Society, 19th century religious publisher

== Other uses ==
- The Regulatory Technical Standard mandated by the EU's revised Payment Services Directive (PSD2)
- Return to sender (disambiguation)
- Ronald Reagan Ballistic Missile Defense Test Site, also known as the "Reagan Test Site"
- RTS.FM, an Internet radio station headquartered in Moscow
