= Decision Review System =

Technology-based system used in the sport of cricket

- Ball tracking visualisation in 2020
- Abbreviation: DRS
- Status: Active
- Year started: 2008
- First published: 2008
- Organization: International Cricket Council (ICC)
- Base standards: Ball tracking: Hawk-Eye or Virtual Eye Sound analysis: Real Time Snicko Infra-red imaging: Hot Spot (Australia-only)

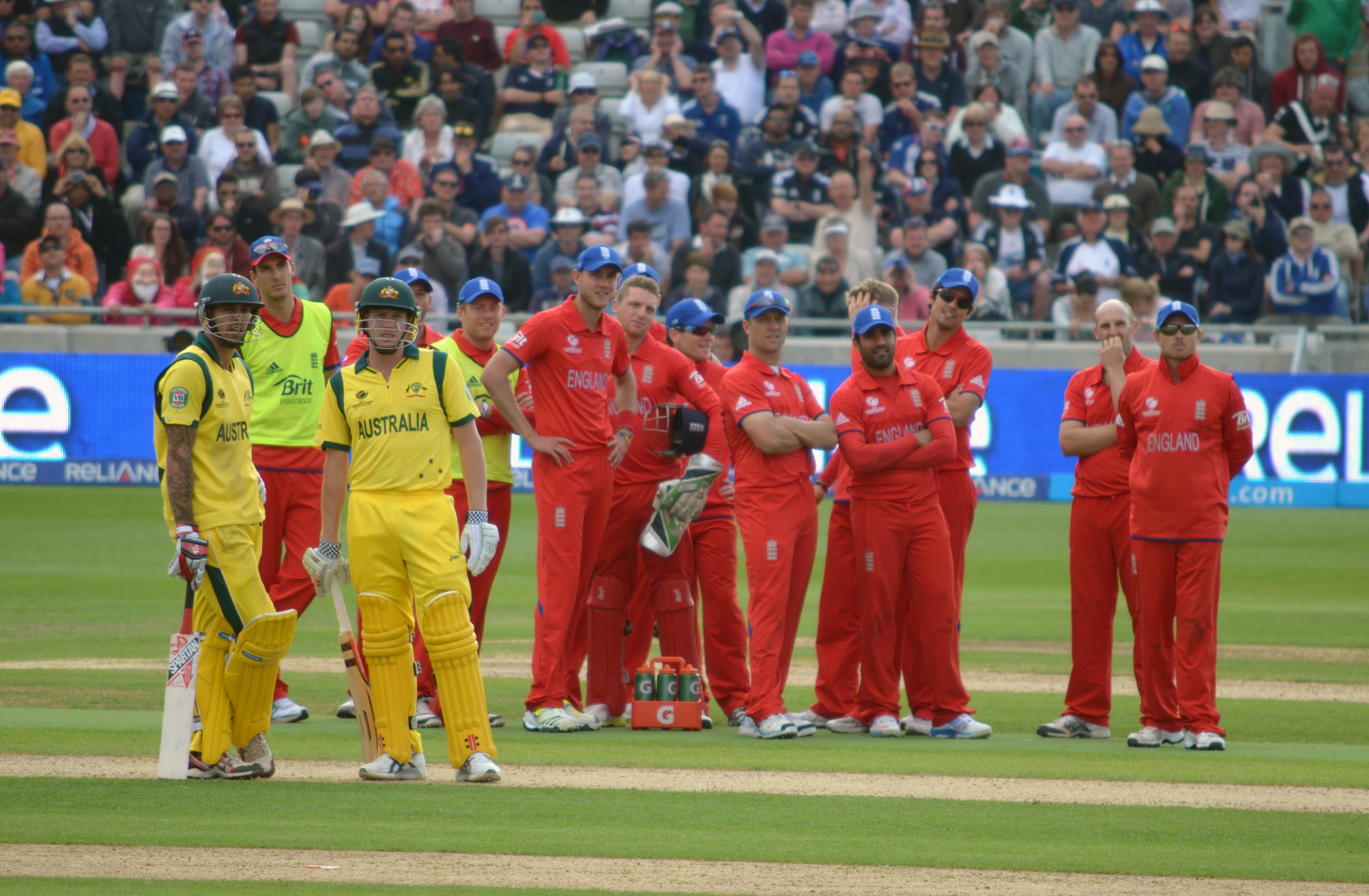
Batters and fielders wait for a decision to be shown on the big LED screen.

The Decision Review System (DRS) is a technology-based system used in cricket to assist the match officials in their decision-making. On-field umpires may choose to consult with the third umpire (known as an Umpire Review), and players may request that the third umpire consider a decision of the on-field umpires (known as a Player Review).

The main elements that have been used are television replays, technology that tracks the path of the ball and predicts what it would have done, microphones to detect small sounds made as the ball hits bat or pad, and infra-red imaging to detect temperature changes as the ball hits the bat or pad.

While on-field Test match umpires have been able to refer some decisions to a third umpire since November 1992, the formal DRS system to add Player Reviews was first used in a Test match in 2008, first used in a One Day International (ODI) in January 2011, and used in a Twenty20 International in October 2017.

== History ==
DRS was preceded by a system to allow on-field umpires to refer some decisions to the third umpire to be decided using TV replays, in place since November 1992.

Sri Lankan born Lawyer Senaka Weeraratna conceived the concept of 'Player Referral' in 1997, who penned a letter which was published in several newspapers. It was then forwarded to Upali Dharmadasa, the then Sri Lankan board president for action.

The Player Referral system was first tested in an India v. Sri Lanka match in 2008, and was officially launched by the International Cricket Council (ICC) on 24 November 2009, during the first Test between New Zealand and Pakistan at the University Oval in Dunedin. It was first used in One Day Internationals (ODI) in January 2011 during Zimbabwe's tour of Australia. The ICC initially made the UDRS mandatory in all international matches, but later made its use optional, so that the system would only be used if both teams agree. The ICC has agreed to continue to work on the technology and will try to incorporate its use into all ICC events.

In October 2012, the ICC made amendments on lbw protocols, increasing the margin of uncertainty when the ball hits the batsman's pad. In July 2016, the rules were amended once again, reducing the margin of uncertainty. The updated rules were first used in the ODI match between Ireland and South Africa in September 2016.

In September 2013, the ICC announced that for a trial period starting in October 2013, a team's referrals would be reset to two after 80 overs in an innings in Test matches. Previously each team had a maximum of two unsuccessful reviews per innings.

Starting in November 2014 from Australia's ODI series versus South Africa, the field umpires' communications have also been broadcast to the viewers. Whenever a decision is reviewed by the TV umpire, their communication with the field umpire can be heard.

In February 2013, the ICC agreed the use for all future ICC World Twenty20 tournaments, with one review per team. The first T20 tournament to use the technology was the 2018 ICC Women's World Twenty20. It was used in the knockout stages of 2017 Indian Premier League, which was the first time DRS used in a T20 league. DRS was used for the first time in a Twenty20 International in the 2014 ICC World Twenty20.

Under the new ICC rules of November 2017, there would no longer be a top-up of reviews after 80 overs in Test matches, and teams will have only 2 unsuccessful reviews every innings. However, teams would no longer lose a review for an "umpire's call" (a ruling in which the on field's umpire's ruling stands due to inconclusive data) on an LBW review.

In 2020, the requirement to appoint neutral match officials was temporarily suspended due to the logistical challenges with international travel during the COVID-19 pandemic. Following from this change, the number of unsuccessful reviews per test innings was raised from 2 to 3 keeping in mind that there may be less experienced umpires on duty at times.

From 1 June 2023, the "soft-signal" requirement for umpires when referring catches was scrapped as they were "unnecessary and at times confusing".

== Components ==
The components of DRS are:

A typical "snick" shown in the Snickometer display

A typical edge shown in the Hot Spot display

- Video replays, including slow motion.
- Hawk-Eye, or Virtual Eye (also known as Eagle Eye): ball-tracking technology that plots the trajectory of a bowling delivery that has been interrupted by the batter, often by the pad, and can predict whether it would have hit the stumps.
- Real Time Snicko (RTS) or Ultra-Edge (Hawk-Eye Innovations): directional microphones to detect small sounds made as the ball hits the bat or pad. The use of the original Snickometer was superseded by Real Time Snicko in 2013. RTS is calibrated each morning without needing manual syncing during play. The third umpire interprets RTS/Ultra-Edge data by checking if an audio spike occurs on the frame before, on the frame, or the frame after the ball passes the bat.
- Hot Spot: Infra-red imaging system that shows where the ball has been in contact with bat or pad. Improved cameras were introduced for the 2012 season. The system came under fire after the 2013 Ashes in England. It was claimed that using silicone tape prevented faint edges being picked by Hot Spot, which was later confirmed by a MIT report.

Comparison of ball-tracking technology
System	No. of cameras	Camera framerate
Hawk-Eye	6	340 fps
Virtual Eye (Eagle Eye)	4	230 fps

== System ==
=== Umpire reviews ===
In many cases, the event occurs in a fraction of a second. At their discretion, on-field umpires may request the Third Umpire reviews the following dismissal decisions:

- Run out. If the on-field umpires are unable to decide if the batsman is out, they may request the third umpire to ascertain whether the batsman had made it home. Also the case where both batsmen have run to the same end and the on-field umpires are uncertain over which batsman made his ground first. An example of this was the Third Test between New Zealand and the West Indies in 2006.
- Caught and Obstructing the field if both umpires are unsure. In some cases the fielder may catch the ball a few inches above ground level. If the umpire's vision is obscured or is unsure if the ball bounced before the fielder caught the ball, he can refer the decision. The third umpire also checks whether the delivery was a no-ball and whether the batsman hit the ball.
- Whether the delivery causing any dismissal was a no-ball.

Note the on-field umpires may not request the Third Umpire review an LBW decision (apart from whether the delivery was a no-ball).

The on-field umpires may also request the Third Umpire reviews the following:

- Boundary calls (to see if a batter hit a four or a six). In some cases the ball may bounce just a foot inside the boundary rope resulting in four runs. If the umpire needs to ascertain if it had been a 4 or a 6, he may consult the third umpire. Near the boundary, often a fielder may dive to save the ball from travelling beyond the boundary. If the fielder makes any simultaneous contact with the boundary and the cricket ball, 4 runs are declared. A third umpire may also be consulted in such a case.
- Whether the ball has hit cameras on or over the field of play.

Umpire Reviews are also available to the on-field umpires when there is a Third umpire but the full UDRS is not in use. In this case, the Third umpire uses television replays (only) to come to a decision, and not the additional technology such as ball-tracking.

=== Player reviews ===
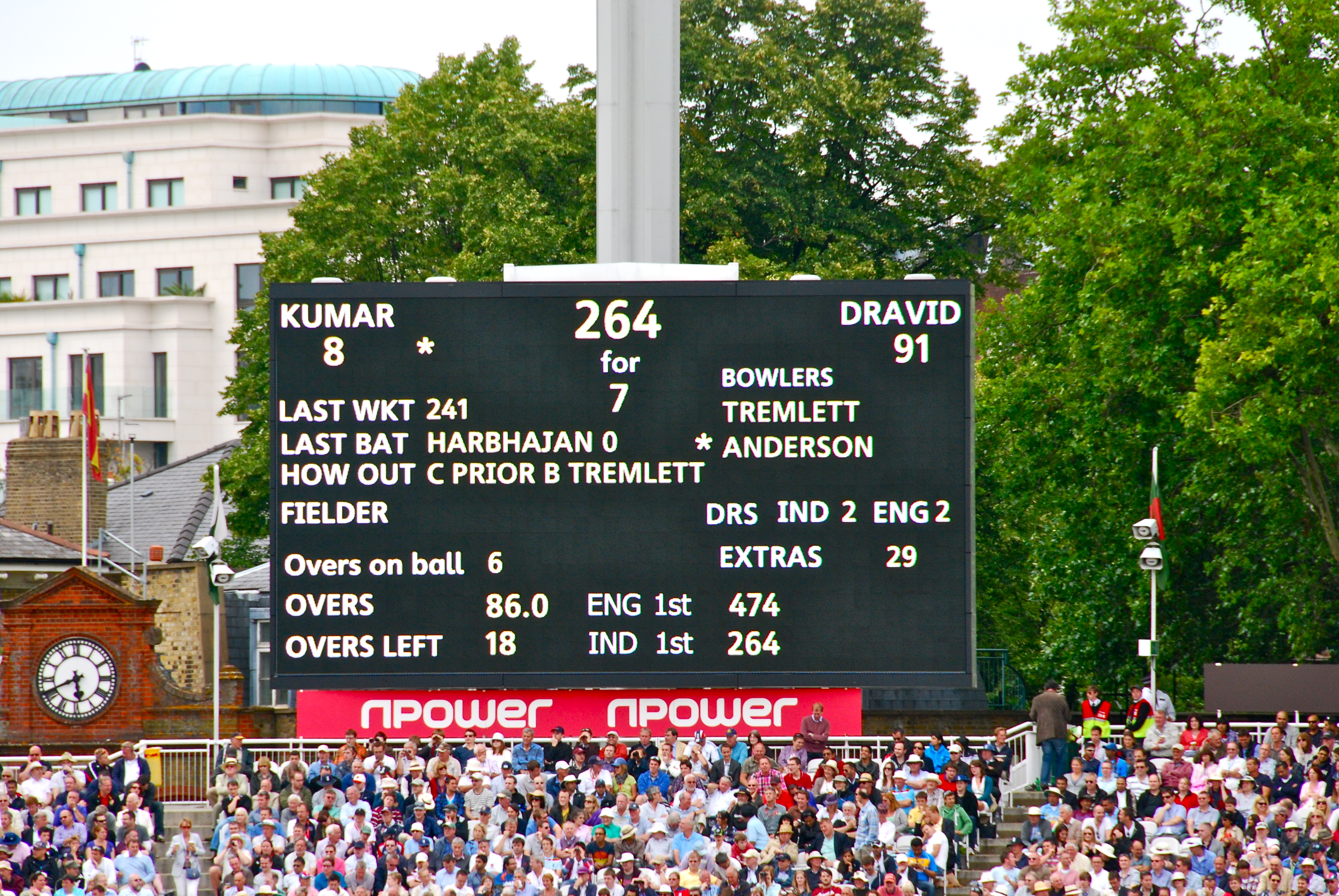
Scoreboard showing number of DRS Player Reviews remaining for India (2) and England (2)

A fielding team may use the system to dispute a "not out" decision and a batting team may use it to dispute an "out" decision. The fielding team captain or the batter being dismissed invokes the challenge by signalling a "T" with the arms or arm and bat. A challenge is only used in situations that did or could result in a dismissal: for example, to determine if the ball is a legal catch (making contact with the batter's bat or glove and not touching the ground before being held by a fielder), or if a delivery made the criteria for an LBW dismissal.

Once the challenge is invoked, acknowledged, and agreed, the Third Umpire reviews the play.

Each team can initiate referrals until they reach the limit of unsuccessful reviews. This limit is three unsuccessful review requests per innings during a Test match, and two unsuccessful review requests per innings during a One Day International or T20I (this limit was temporarily raised to three per innings for tests and two for one-day matches from July 2020 as a COVID-19-related rule change but has since become permanent). From 2013 until September 2017, the number of reviews available for a team in a Test innings was topped-up to two after 80 overs. From October 2017, if the on-field decision remains unchanged because the DRS shows "umpire's call", the team will not lose its review.

==== Umpire's call ====
As DRS is designed to allow for clear errors to be corrected, umpires call is utilised in situations where there are doubts in the accuracy of the technology, or the decision is not a clear error. This is utilised when determining LBW.

When determining LBW, the umpire must be sure of multiple factors. Where the ball "pitches" or lands on the pitch, where the ball impacts on the player, if the player has hit the ball with their bat before it impacts the player, as well as if the ball would have gone on to hit the stumps. This is usually split into three sections. "Pitching", "Impact" and "Wickets".

Umpire's call is not utilised for where the ball pitches, or if the player has hit the ball first.

For a decision to be Umpire's call, the ball must either be judged to impact the player with less than 50% of the ball in line with the stumps, or less than 50% of the ball must be judged to be hitting the stumps, either horizontally or vertically.

In addition, due to issues with the technology available, any impact with the player 300 cm or more from the stumps, or less than 40 cm between the ball pitching and impact the player, is also judged to be the Umpire's call.

If either impact or wickets is judged umpires call. The umpire's original decision is upheld and the reviewing team retains their review.

The implementation of the Umpire's call has been noted in other sports whereby similar issues have arisen in the case of highly-marginal decisions (i.e. not a "clear mistake) which are perceived to be unfairly decided by forensic and technical means.

On April 4, 2021, in the International Cricket Council committee meeting led by Anil Kumble, the height margin of the Wicket Zone was lifted to the top of the stumps to ensure the same Umpire's Call margin around the stumps for both height and width.

==== Final decision ====
The third umpire then looks at various TV replays from different angles, comes to a conclusion, and then reports to the on-field umpire whether their analysis supports the original call, contradicts it, or is inconclusive. The on-field umpire then makes the final decision by either re-signalling a call that is standing or revoking a call that is being reversed (usually by placing their crossed hands on shoulders) and then making the corrected signal. Only clearly incorrect decisions are reversed; if the Third Umpire's analysis is not within established margins of error or is otherwise inconclusive, the on-field umpire's original call stands.

== Officiating replay system ==
In 2013, ICC tested a broadcaster-free replay system. Under the experiment, a non-match umpire sits in a separate room with a giant monitor and has discretion over which replays to see rather than relying on the broadcaster. The non-match umpire mirrors the role of the third umpire without having the duty of making adjudications. The system was first used in an Ashes Test (where Nigel Llong performed the duties of non-match umpire) and was repeated in a Pakistan-Sri Lanka ODI.

After The Ashes in 2013, the ICC has started to take steps to give third umpire access to instant replays. This is regardless of calls being referred to by on-field umpires. By doing so, ICC wants to make sure that any obvious mistakes are avoided in future.

== Reception ==
The Decision Review System has generally received positive response from players and coaches since its launch. Because of its positive response, the ICC has attempted to apply uniform application of DRS in all cricket games around the world, but this has been difficult for some countries to implement. Some countries, especially the poorer ones, are unable to afford the technology and choose to use parts of it or not use it at all. The technology is often used by broadcasters to bring an even more vivid analysis of specific plays and games. It was designed to eradicate the errors of umpires, and it has done so in many games.

However, there have been some negative responses to the DRS technology as well. West Indies legend Joel Garner labelled the system a "gimmick". Another West Indian Ramnaresh Sarwan said that he was not a supporter of the experimental referral system. Former umpire Dickie Bird also criticised the system, saying it undermines the authority of on-field umpires. The BCCI has expressed a skeptical view on the adoption of the system if it is near perfect. Pakistani spinner Saeed Ajmal expressed dissatisfaction over the Decision Review System after a semi-final of the 2011 Cricket World Cup against India. He said that DRS showed the line of the ball deviating more than it actually did. Hawk-Eye officials admitted in December 2014 that their review technology made an error in a decision to give Pakistan opener Shan Masood out in the second Test against New Zealand in Dubai (17–21 November 2014). At a meeting held at the ICC office in Dubai two weeks later, Hawk-Eye is understood to have conceded to Pakistan captain Misbah-ul-Haq and team manager Moin Khan that the projection used by their technology for the Leg before wicket decision was incorrect. Also, a challenge can only be made by the captain within a 15-second window from when an initial decision is made, but it can be lengthened if no clear decision is made, especially they are assumed not out if there is no reaction by the umpire.

During the 2012/2013 domestic season Cricket Australia trialed a review system in the domestic one day competition where the third umpire could intervene and review any out or not out decision. The review system was unpopular among players and critics, which the Australian International Twenty20 captain George Bailey calling the system "shocking and embarrassing". The review system was dropped by Cricket Australia after only two rounds of the competition.

During an ODI between Australia and South Africa in June 2016, Hawk-Eye's accuracy came under criticism after AB de Villiers was dismissed clean bowled by Josh Hazlewood but subsequent Hawk-Eye trajectory prediction of the same delivery showed that the ball would go over the stumps.

== Player Review statistics ==
An analysis of more than 2,100 Player Reviews between September 2009 and March 2017 found that:

- 26% of Player Reviews resulted in on-field decisions being overturned.
- Reviews by batsmen were less frequent than reviews by bowling teams, as 41% of reviews were by batsmen and 59% by bowling teams.
- Reviews by batsmen were more likely to be successful, with a 34% success rate, compared to a success rate of about 20% for bowling teams.
- 74% of referrals were for LBW, 18% for wicketkeeper catches, and the rest for catches elsewhere or indeterminate reason. The success rate was only 22% for LBW, compared to 40% for wicketkeeper catches.
- There were on average about 1.4 batting overturns and 1.2 bowling overturns per match. Initial fears that DRS would bring an increase in the number of dismissals have, therefore, not come true.
- The DRS claims to have 90% accuracy

== See also ==
- Hawk-Eye
- Automated Ball-Strike System
