= Immigrant surveillance =

Immigrant surveillance refers to the practice of tracking both illegal and legal immigrants through several methods, some of which include electronic verification, border surveillance, or federal raids. Historically, countries such as the United States have required that immigrants carry evidence of citizenship. Controversies within immigrant surveillance in the United States involve the alleged racial profiling committed by police departments and negligence found in detention centers. Laws concerning surveillance and immigration vary by country but terrorist attacks have made the issue more prevalent.

== History ==
=== The United States ===
==== 1700s–1900s ====
Immigrant surveillance has been a prevalent issue throughout United States history. Historians argue that policies involving immigration surveillance are a product of nativism and can be evidenced throughout United States history. The Alien and Sedition Acts of the 1790s is one of the earliest cases of immigration surveillance, allowing the president to act on their own discretion in regards to whether or not non-citizens were dangerous to the country because of their nationality. Congress passed its first exclusionary immigration law with the Page Act of 1875, which prohibited entry to immigrants from Asia that were thought of as undesirable, such as prostitutes and convicts. In 1893, a United States Supreme Court case involving a similar issue, Fong Yue Ting v. United States, ruled that the federal government had the right to arrest and deport non-citizens if they failed to carry certification verifying their lawful residency even if there was no other crimes committed.

After the assassination of President William McKinley in 1901 by Leon Czologosz, the son of Polish immigrants, the United States acted to exclude the entry of anarchists or those who had violet opposition to the United States government.

==== World War I ====
During World War I, Congress passed the Immigration Act of 1918 which ordered the deportation of immigrants that held anarchist beliefs in the United States. During the war, anti-German sentiments began increasing in the United States. The Department of Justice began placing German nationals in internment camps as a result of the war. The number of German nationals arrested during 1918 rose to 6,300. Those who were not placed in internment camps were required to register and were ordered not to leave the country.

==== World War II ====
The government began to take increasing actions against potentially dangerous immigrants during World War II. This was the result of the Pearl Harbor attack by Japanese forces. The Smith Act was enacted in 1940 and dealt with the deportation for various offenses and added registration requirements, including the fingerprinting of immigrants before being issued a visa. In addition to the Smith Act, the federal government ordered the internment of over 100,000 people of Japanese descent, many of which were immigrants. In 1988, President Ronald Reagan signed the Civil Liberties Act of 1988 which established legislation that authorized the payment of $20,000 to each surviving Japanese American that was affected by internment.

J. Edgar Hoover also ordered for the detention of Italian and German immigrants during this time because of their connections to the war. Four days before the United States declared war on Italy, government agencies began detaining German nationals and detained them in facilities for processing before their eventual internment. President Roosevelt signed Proclamation No. 2527, which categorized illegal Italian immigrants as "alien enemies." Though Proclamation No. 2527 only categorized illegal Italian Americans as enemies, Italians with American citizenship were also targeted for arrests. Under Proclamation No. 2526, German nationals and German Americans were also arrested and detained.

==== McCarthyism ====
After World War II, surveillance against alleged communists and foreign nationals became widespread. The McCarthyism Era began around 1947 and ended in the late 1950s. With the rise of the McCarthyism Era in the United States, anyone who had ideals that contrasted that of the United States, such as communists, would be questioned. This resulted in the deportation of approximately 850 non-citizens to Europe. This also led to the Immigration and Nationality Act of 1952 which introduced an ideological criteria. Immigrants and visitors of the United States were denied entry on the basis of political ideology, this was used to limit communism. Though the curbing of communism was the end goal of McCarthyism, many anarchists were also not widely accepted.

==== Post September 11 attacks ====
After the September 11 attacks, the United States increased its surveilling of citizens and non-citizens in order to prevent terrorism. After the attacks, the United States focused on issuing various forms of counter-terrorism, from internet surveillance to increased border surveillance. The United States government alongside some states, increased efforts to regulate immigration from the interior of the border. The proposals that have been drafted and passed by lawmakers expect individuals to demonstrate their lawful presence in the United States. With the passing of the Patriot Act, the possibility of indefinite detentions for immigrants became possible. The Patriot Act was enacted seven weeks after the September 11 attacks and allowed for the deportation of immigrants that were suspected of terrorist activity. Under the Patriot Act, immigrants that were considered threats to national security could also be indefinitely detained without the possibility of bond. Detention would also become indefinite if the immigrant's country did not want to receive the immigrant in question. As a result of this, multiple civil liberties organizations such as the American Civil Liberties Union (ACLU) began to file lawsuits against federal districts to declare the detention of multiple Muslim men unconstitutional.

== Surveillance methods ==
=== The United States ===
==== State surveillance ====
Since 2002, the Department of Homeland Security (DHS) has made the enforcement of surveillance interior of the border its main priority, focusing on undocumented workers, suspected gang members, and unlawful immigrants with the final order of removal. Two of the biggest operations that targeted these groups have been Operation Return to Sender and Operation Community Shield, conducted by U.S. Immigration and Customs Enforcement (ICE) starting in 2006.

In a legislative response to the September 11 attacks, Congress passed the Aviation Transportation and Security Act (ATSA) in November 2001. This required all baggage screeners to be United States citizens. The ATSA also created the Transportation Security Administration (TSA) which ensures the safety of the traveling population in the United States. Passing of the ATSA ensured that many airports would have high security standards, but resulted in immigrants losing their jobs because of it. During the passing of the ATSA, approximately twenty percent of airport screeners were legal immigrants.

In 2002, the Department of Justice (DOJ) announced that it would renew the enforcement of section 265(a) of the Immigration and Nationality Act, which required all non-citizens to report if there was a change in their address. This was met with controversy because many of those who tried to submit forms stating their change of address were not able to have their forms processed. In July 2002, it was reported that the Immigration and Naturalization Service (INS) had approximately 200,000 unprocessed change of address forms.

The Social Security Administration (SSA) has issued no-match letters, which notifies employers that they have workers with Social Security Numbers that do not match the name stated in the SSA database. The program received an expansion and issued approximately 750,000 letters to employers in 2002. In turn, the earnings made by workers that are named in the no-match letters must fix the error in order to receive them. The Earnings Suspense File, an electronic holding file for wages that cannot be claimed to earnings, has not decreased in size through this method. Another technological advancement that has resulted in surveillance is E-Verify. E-Verify has the ability to determine the citizenship status of a potential employee and allows for the employer to act on their own discretion with this information. This is considered a helpful program that assists employers to protect themselves from hiring unlawful immigrants, which is punishable by law. Some critics of E-Verify argue that this further makes immigrants more vulnerable to exploitation.

==== Border surveillance ====
Since the September 11 attacks, measures were taken to keep the borders of the United States secure. President George W. Bush signed the Enhanced Border Security and Visa Entry Reform Act of 2002. This Act provides for the increase of intelligence gathering and allows for information found to be shared among government agencies. This act focused on the security arrangements between the United States, Mexico, and Canada in hopes of preventing another terrorist attack. In addition, the Bush administration signed agreements with Canada and Mexico in order to create regional security zones, later referred to the Smart Border agreements. What was initially a four-part Action Plan turned into a thirty-point Action Plan within a year. Within the Mexico–United States border, there have been new implementations to surveil people that cross unlawfully. Ground-level radar is used to detect movement at the border, using computer programs to determine if it is an animal versus a human. The law enforcement located at the port of entry focuses on the foot and car traffic. The documentation that is required at this port has become more difficult to forge, now requiring a biometric identification that can be found on a computer-readable strip.

== Controversies ==
=== The United States ===
The Fourth Amendment

The Fourth Amendment is often used to argue against the federal raids that occur in the homes of unlawful immigrants, sometimes resulting in illegal searches and seizes. The Fourth Amendment has been interpreted to signify that a warrant or probable cause is required in order to search a home, but this is not relevant when there is a suspicion that a person is violating a law. Though the Fourth Amendment was initially created to protect the home, it protects persons from public seizes more than it does private ones. If the Fourth Amendment is violated, the person can sue the officer in question for damages in federal court. In the United States Supreme Court decision, United States v. Martinez-Fuerte, it was decided that the Fourth Amendment was not violated in cases of interior checkpoints. Though this became a decision because of the importance of public interest over the protected interest of a private citizen, some would argue that this allowed for racial profiling because it permits for the inspection of suspicious persons.

==== Federal raids ====
One of the most controversial issues within immigration surveillance are the raids conducted by ICE. Though some of the programs conducted by ICE have been effective in deporting copious numbers of people, it has been met with criticism and multiple lawsuits. These lawsuits came after some of the homes that were raided had outdated and inaccurate information about the persons living in the residence. Immigrant rights organizations have critiqued the methods ICE uses to detain illegal immigrants, sometimes grouping criminal illegal immigrants with non-violent illegal immigrants. Some of the critics of the program believe the behavior of ICE is coercive because of how they choose to identify themselves to residents and the lack of information they offer residents, making it unclear that there is the ability to refuse consent. Those who praise the programs have done so because of the large arrest rates. Between May 2006 and February 2007, Operation Return to Sender lead to the arrest of 18,149 people. The Obama Administration oversaw mass deportations that occurred in 2014, many illegal immigrants deported were of Central American descent.

==== Arizona SB 1070 ====
Arizona was in the midst of controversy during 2010 due to its passage of Arizona SB 1070, making it a misdemeanor crime if an unlawful citizen did not carry identification that determined if they were in the country legally. This legislation also allowed for officers to attempt to determine an individual's immigration status based on reasonable suspicion. Arizona was the first state in the country to pass legislation that penalized employers for knowingly hiring unlawful immigrants. In addition, Joe Arpaio, former sheriff of Maricopa County, was another controversial figure at the time due to the raids he conducted in predominantly Latino neighborhoods in Phoenix. The controversies surrounding the state of Arizona called for different social organizations, such as the ACLU to challenge the law. Opponents of this law cited that it promoted racial profiling and was surveilling people unlawfully.

==== Detention centers ====
Detention centers in the United States have become a controversial topic due to the reports and allegations of mistreatment towards illegal immigrants. In 2009, the ACLU and the National Immigration Law Center filed a lawsuit concerning the treatment of immigrants within a detention center in Los Angeles. The lawsuit filed by both agencies detailed that the detainees were held up to ten hours or more despite overcrowding in the detention center and without access to water or beds. In another instance, Francisco Castaneda, a Salvadoran immigrant, was denied a biopsy while in prison for eleven months for a lesion he had. He was later diagnosed with cancer and died. In 2010, the T. Don Hutto Residential Center was investigated by the DHS after it was discovered that a male detention officer was sexually assaulting women that were in his custody while they were in his sole custody. This was in violation of DHS policies and the private company that was contracted to run the facility, Corrections Corporation of America, was put on probation during the investigation process. As of 2011, there were no mental health resources or legal obligations to provide inmates in detention centers with legal representation.
