= Return to sender =

Return to sender may refer to:

== Arts and entertainment ==
- "Return to Sender" (song), a 1962 Elvis Presley song
- Return to Sender (1963 British film), a 1963 British film, part of the Edgar Wallace Mysteries
- Sin Remitente (also known as 'Return to Sender' and 'Sender Unknown'), a 1995 Mexican drama film written and directed by Carlos Carrera
- Return to Sender (2004 film), a 2004 film, starring Aidan Quinn, Connie Nielsen, Tim Daly and Kelly Preston
- "Return to Sender" (Dexter), a 2006 episode of the television series Dexter
- Return to Sender (2015 film), a 2015 film, starring Rosamund Pike, Shiloh Fernandez, and Nick Nolte
- Return to Sender, a webcomic by Vera Brosgol

== Other uses ==
- "Return to sender", a phrase used when undeliverable mail is processed to be returned to the indicated return address
- Operation Return to Sender, a 2006 sweep of illegal immigrants by the U.S. Immigration and Customs Enforcement

== See also ==
- RTS (disambiguation)
