= Project Southern Tempest =

Law enforcement operation in the United States

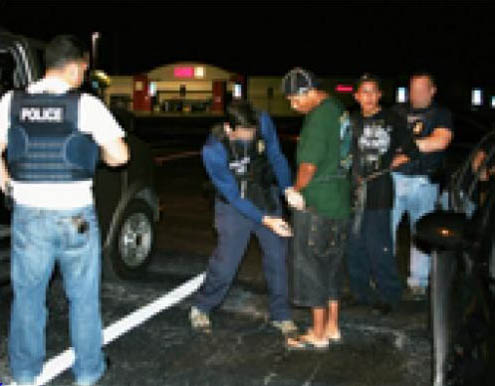
- ICE making an arrest in Salt Lake City
- Date: December 2010 – February 2011
- Outcome: Successful project, 678 gang members and associates arrested

Project Southern Tempest was a major U.S. Immigration and Customs Enforcement (ICE) operation conducted between December 2010 and February 2011 targeting transnational street gang members with ties to drug cartels in Mexico, as part of the ongoing law enforcement initiative known as Operation Community Shield.

== Project ==
During Project Southern Tempest, ICE's Homeland Security Investigations (HSI) unit and officers from 173 cooperating federal, state and local law enforcement agencies arrested 678 individuals from 133 different gangs, in 168 cities across the nation. Of the 678 arrested, over 46% percent were members or associates of gangs with ties to drug trafficking organizations (DTOs) in Mexico.

ICE Director John Morton issued the following statement: "Project Southern Tempest is the largest ever ICE-led gang enforcement operation targeting gangs with ties to drug trafficking organizations. Through gang enforcement operations like Project Southern Tempest and Project Big Freeze last year, ICE will continue to disrupt and dismantle these transnational gangs and rid our streets not only of drug dealers, but the violence associated with the drug trade."

In addition to the 678 arrested gang members, 164 individuals were arrested for federal and/or state criminal violations, or administrative immigration violations. Of the 164, 117 were charged with criminal offenses, 46 had violent criminal histories, 47 were administrative arrests and 78 were foreign nationals. Eighty-six firearms, eight pounds (3.6 kg) of methamphetamine, 30 pounds (14 kg) of marijuana, one pound (0.45 kg) of cocaine, over US$70,000 and two vehicles were also seized.

== Arrests ==
Those arrested came from 24 countries in South and Central America, Asia, Africa and the Caribbean. Of the total number of arrested, 776 were males and 72 were females.

Of the 678 gang members or associates arrested:

- They hailed from 133 different gangs;
- 447 were charged with criminal offenses;
- 231 were administrative arrests;
- 322 had violent criminal histories;
- 421 were foreign nationals.

Among those arrested during Project Southern Tempest were:

- Andrey Melnikov, 36, a Russian national with legal permanent residence status and an associate of the Valleros gang was arrested in Oceanside, California., for auto theft. His criminal convictions include possession of weapon on school grounds/carrying loaded firearm public place and felon in possession of a firearm.
- Cesar Enrique Barreiro, 27, a U.S. citizen and member of the Lennox 13 gang was arrested in Lennox, California., for RICO charges from an ongoing multi-agency investigation. His criminal convictions include for aggravated assault with serious bodily injury. He faces federal criminal prosecution on racketeering charges.
- Shawn Allison, 32, a Jamaican national and member of the Jamaican Posse gang was arrested in the Bronx, New York., for attempted murder. His convictions include possession with intent to distribute and criminal contempt. He faces state criminal prosecution on charges of attempted murder.
- Rodimiro Burquez-Cortez, 34, a Mexican national and Surenos gang associate was arrested in Provo, Utah, for re-entry after deportation and narcotics and weapon offenses. His criminal convictions include illegal re-entry; carrying a concealed weapon, assault, DWI, illegal possession of controlled substance, possession of dangerous weapon. He faces federal criminal prosecution for re-entry of previously removed alien, illegal alien in possession of a firearm, and felon in possession of a firearm.
- Gustavo Morales, 52, a Mexican national and an associate of the Boomerangz gang was arrested in Reading, Pennsylvania., for federal offenses related to narcotics and weapons violations. His criminal history has a conviction for re-entry. He faces federal prosecution for illegal re-entry and narcotics and weapon offenses.

During Project Southern Tempest, the HSI-led Salt Lake City Operation Community Shield Task Force arrested the 20,000th gang member since the beginning of the operation in 2005.

== See also ==
- Illegal immigration to the United States
- Mexican drug war
