= Project Shadowfire =

2016 US criminal investigation

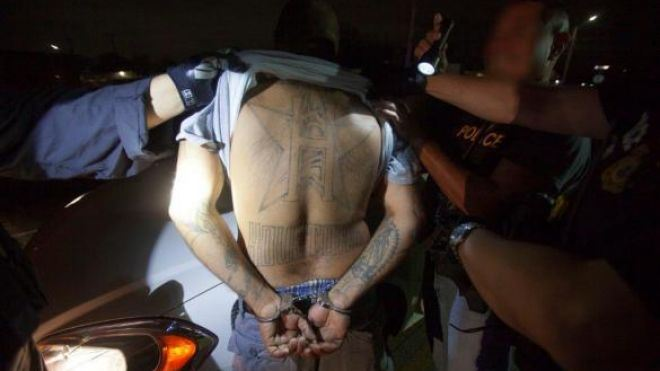
- ICE arresting a suspected gang member
- Date: February 15 – March 21, 2016
- Location: California, Texas, Georgia, Puerto Rico
- Outcome: Successful project: 1,133 arrested, $70,000 and 20 kilos of narcotics seized

Project Shadowfire was an American police investigation in early 2016 that resulted in the arrest of 1,133 people, 915 of whom were suspected members of "multinational organized criminal gangs", involved in murder, racketeering, drug smuggling and human trafficking from Mexico and elsewhere. The majority of the arrests took place in Los Angeles and San Francisco in California; El Paso and Houston, Texas; Atlanta, Georgia, and San Juan, Puerto Rico. 70,000 US, 150 firearms and more than 20 kg narcotics were seized.

Of the 1133 arrested, 1001 were charged with criminal offenses, and 132 were arrested for immigration violations. Over 900 of those arrested were believed to be members or associates of MS-13, Sureños, Norteños, Bloods and other prison gangs. U.S. Immigration and Customs Enforcement (ICE) officials confirmed that most of those arrested were American citizens, though 239 were foreign nationals from Central America, the Caribbean, Asia and Europe.

== Response ==
According to Peter Edge of Homeland Security Investigations in an interview with ABC News, gangs in the United States have seen an increase in prevalence. He noted that gangs are becoming more organized as gang members enter the country, whether legally or illegally, and engage in various recruiting activities. The objective is for these criminal gang members to undergo judicial processing and, if applicable, be deported if they are not citizens of the United States.

Former ICE Director Sarah Saldaña issued a statement regarding Project Shadowfire, stating that it exemplifies ICE's ongoing efforts, which began over a decade ago under Operation Community Shield, to target violent gang members and their associates. The operation aims to eliminate the violence inflicted by these gangs on communities and disrupt the financial resources that support transnational organized crime groups operating abroad.

== See also ==
- Illegal immigration to the United States
- Mexican drug war
- Operation Community Shield
