= Project Wildfire =

American criminal investigation

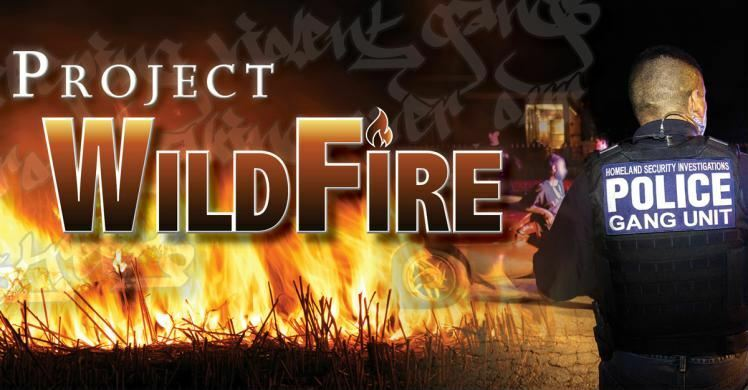
- Date: February 23 – March 31, 2015
- Location: California, Florida, Illinois, Michigan, Puerto Rico, Texas
- Outcome: Successful project

Project Wildfire was a nationwide, multi-agency investigation of various transnational criminal gangs in the United States mainland and Puerto Rico. It began on February 23, 2015, and concluded on March 31 of the same year. It resulted in the arrests of 976 individuals, representing 239 different organizations, in 282 cities. Eighty-two firearms, 5.2 kg (11 lb) of methamphetamine, 7.8 kg (17 lb) of marijuana, 5.6 kg (12 lb) of cocaine, 1.5 kg (3.3 lb) of heroin, US$379,399 cash, counterfeit merchandise with a suggested retail price of US$547,534, and five vehicles were seized.

As part of the ongoing U.S. Immigration and Customs Enforcement (ICE) effort known as Operation Community Shield, Project Wildfire began on February 23, 2015, and concluded on March 31, with most arrests involving members and those affiliated with the Crips, Bloods, and Sureños, along with a few Puerto Rican gangs and several prison-based gangs. Arrests were made all around the country, with the greatest activity taking place in Texas, Detroit, Los Angeles County, Florida and San Juan, Puerto Rico.

== Arrests ==
The following number of arrests, made by Homeland Security Investigations (HSI) and other participating agencies, were released by ICE:

- In Lubbock, Texas, HSI special agents and task force officers arrested 122 known or suspected gang members and associates from the Bloods, Crips, Rolling 60s, Mexican Mafia, Sureños, West Texas, Raza Unida, Aryan Brotherhood, White Aryan Resistance, West Side, Gangster Disciples, Peckerwood, Texas Syndicate and West Texas Tango.
- In the Detroit area, (HSI) special agents and task force officers arrested 89 gang members and associates with ties to gangs such as the Latin Counts, Folk Nation, Sureños and Atherton Terrace.
- In Puerto Rico and central Florida, 46 members of the Zorrilla criminal organization were arrested for various charges of manufacturing and distributing narcotics, money laundering and other related criminal activity.
- In the Chicago area, HSI special agents arrested 30 gang members and affiliates with ties to the Sureños 13, Latin Kings, La Raza, Conservative Vice Lords, Gangster Disciples, 4 Corner Hustlers, Maniac Latin Disciples and the Vice Lords.
- In California's Imperial Valley, HSI special agents arrested 28 individuals, including 10 documented gang members of the Brole, North Side Centro, West Side Centro, South Side Centro and Pilgrim street gangs.

== See also ==
- Illegal immigration to the United States
- Mexican drug war
