= Spectator sport =

Sport characterized by the presence of spectators

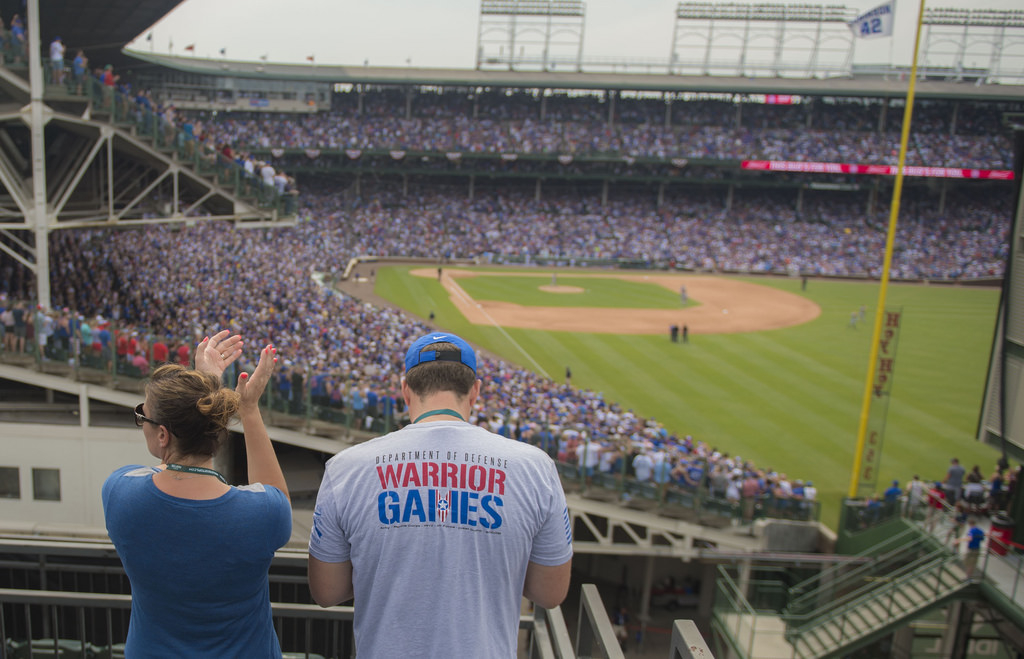
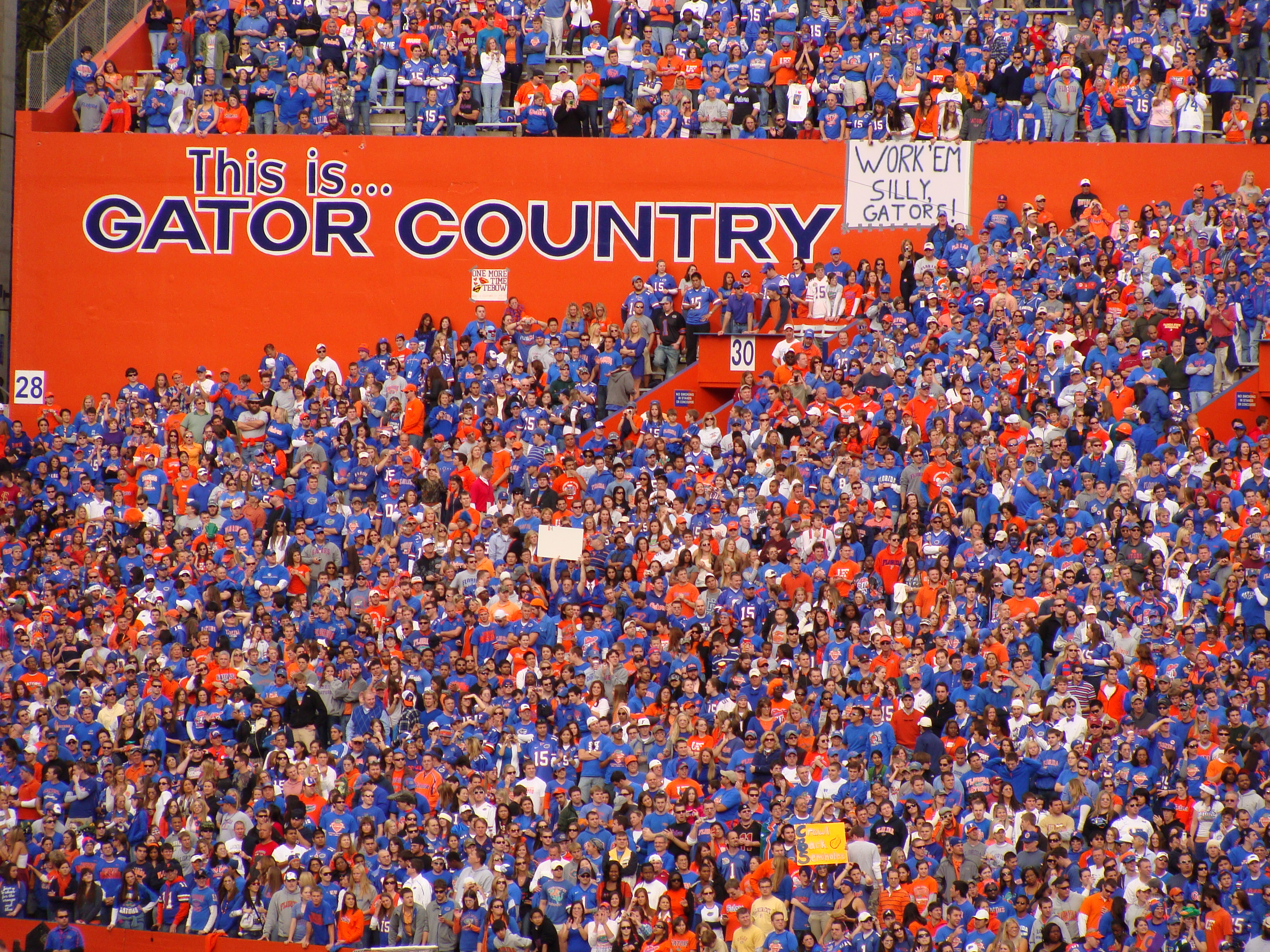
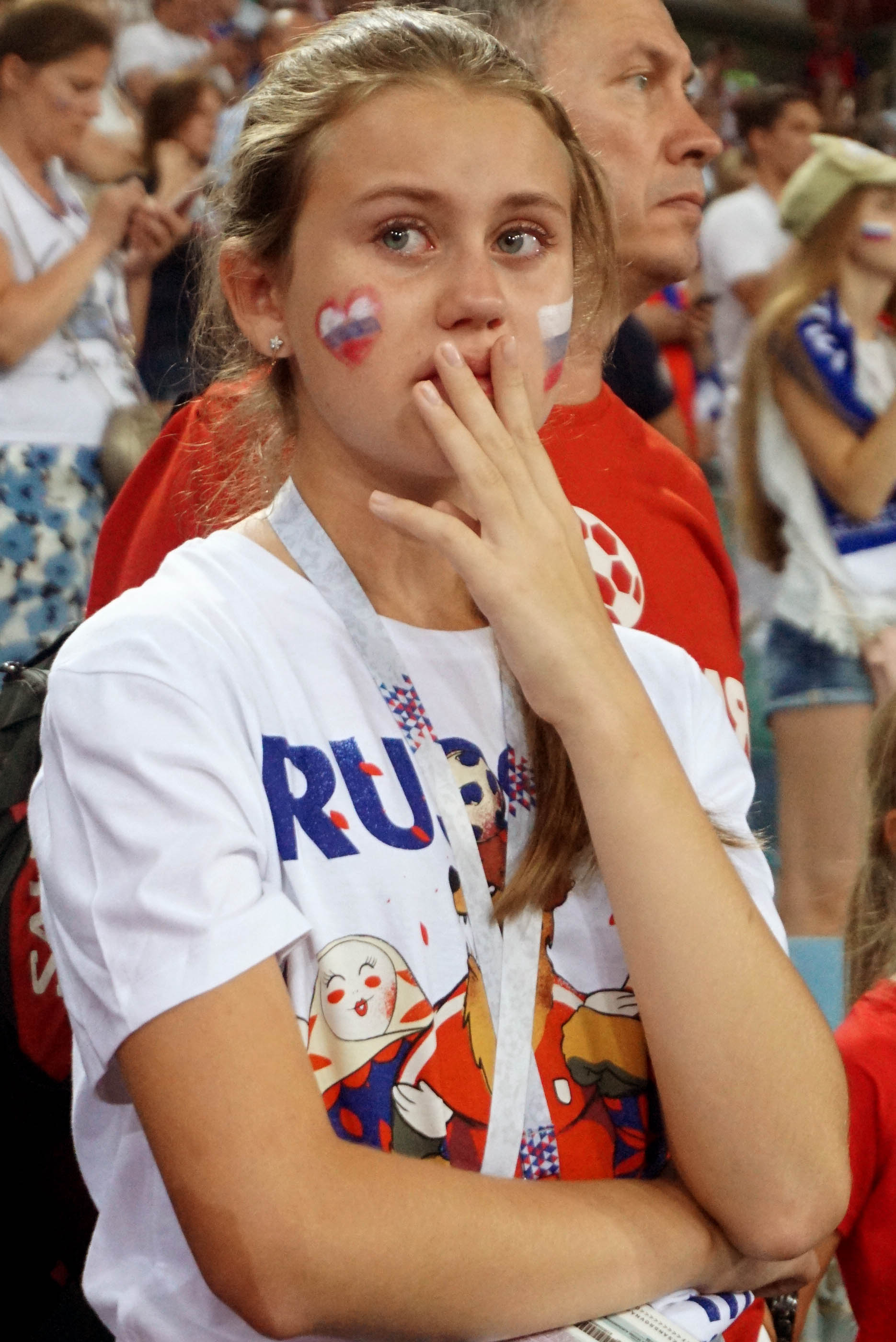
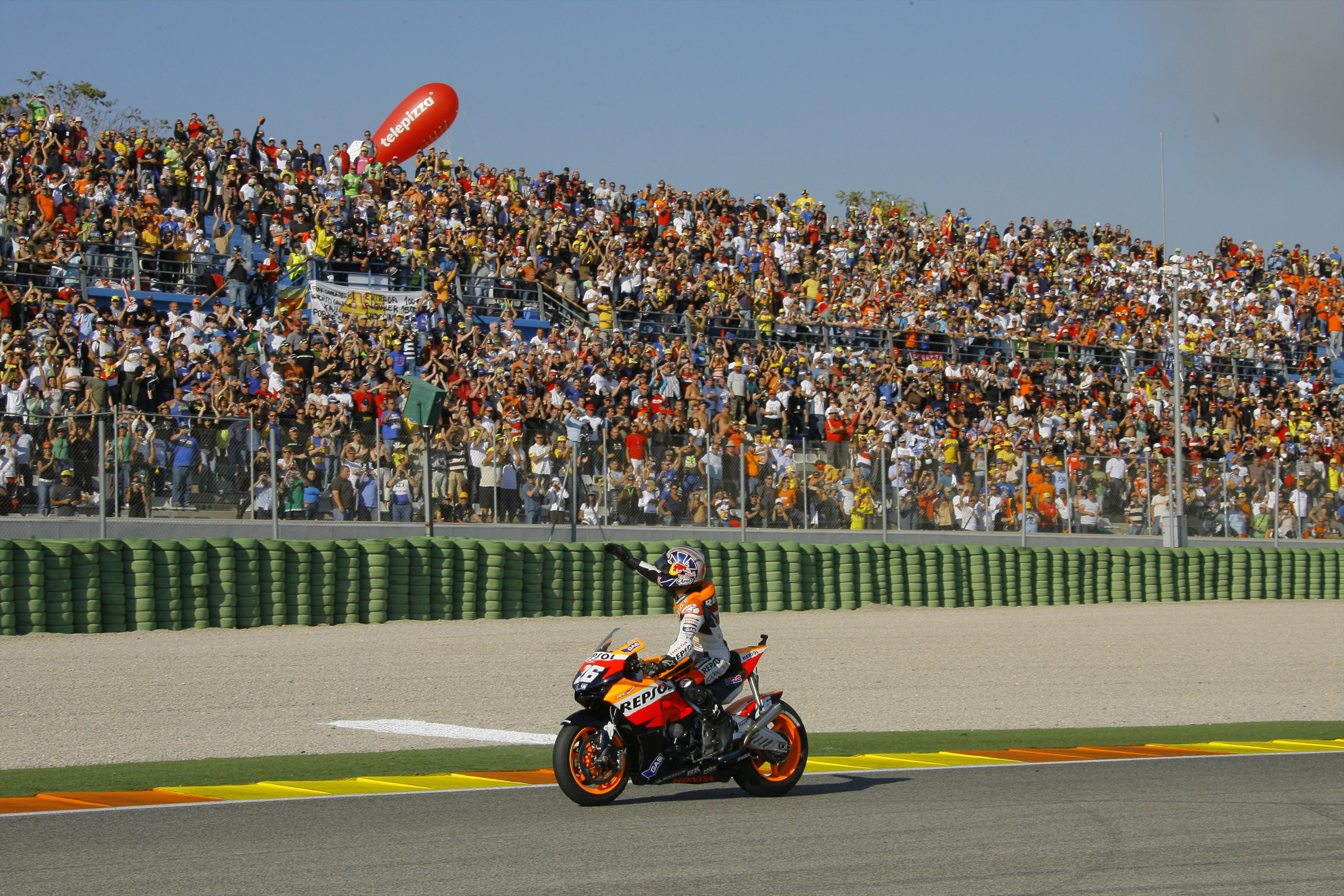
- Top left: Spectators at a baseball game between the Chicago Cubs and Tampa Bay Rays in 2017
- Top right: An American college football match between Florida and Florida State being watched by supporters
- Bottom left: An emotional spectator at an association football match between Russia and Croatia at the 2018 FIFA World Cup
- Bottom right: Dani Pedrosa waving to spectators at the 2007 Valencian Community motorcycle Grand Prix

A spectator sport is a sport that is characterized by the presence of spectators, or watchers, at its competitions. Spectator sports may be professional sports or amateur sports. They often are distinguished from participant sports, which are more recreational.

== Overview ==
Most popular sports are both spectator and participant, for example association football, basketball, cricket, tennis, rugby, golf, athletics and volleyball. Less popular sports are mainly participant sports, for example hunting.

The increasing broadcasting of sports events, along with media reporting can affect the number of people attending sports due to the ability to experience the sport without the need to physically attend and sometimes an increasingly enhanced experience including highlights, replays, commentary, statistics and analysis. Some sports are particularly known as "armchair sports" or "lounge room sports" due to the quality of the broadcasting experience in comparison to the live experience.

Spectator sports have built their own set of culture and traditions including, in the United States, cheerleading, team mascots, and pre-game and half time entertainment such as fireworks, particularly for big games such as competition decider events and international tests. The passion of some sports fans also means that there are occasionally spectator incidents.

The North American Society for Sport Management (NASSM) devotes much of their annual conference to research addressing the psychology behind a desire to view spectator sports, and how it might be leveraged to increase demand. Much of the research focuses on exploiting a need for vicarious achievement, and a desire within the spectator to project a public image through a declaration of team allegiance.

Separation of the active and the passive, the line between sport and spectator, gives rise to the paradox of the spectator—described by French philosopher Jacques Rancière—which is to seek an opportunity to passively contemplate engaging in an activity, and in doing so, forfeit that life moment one might have used to actually engage in the activity.

== See also ==
- List of sports attendance figures
- Moundball
- Sport fandom
