= Moundball =

Baseball spectator side-betting game

Moundball is a side-betting game typically played by spectators sitting in the bleachers at Major League Baseball games. It is often played to pass the time during slow games. At the start of the game, each player places their ante into a plastic cup or hat; the kitty is then passed to the next person at each half inning. The game is turn-based, with the goal of having the ball remain on the mound at the end of a player's half-inning turn, in order to win and collect all the money in the kitty.

== Rules ==
The rules for Moundball are:

- An ante amount is established prior to the game (e.g, $1, $5, etc.).
- A passing order is established among all participants.
- Prior to the beginning of the game, each player places their ante into a plastic cup (or hat), forming a kitty.
- Between each half inning, each player places the ante amount in the cup.
- Between each half inning, the kitty is passed to the next player in the passing order.
- Between each half inning, the ball is monitored to determine if has been placed on the dirt of the pitcher's mound by the umpire.
  - If the ball remains at rest completely upon the dirt of the pitcher's mound, the player who has been holding the kitty during that half of the inning wins the kitty and keeps the money in the cup. Each player places another ante amount in the cup and the cup is passed to the next player in the passing order.
  - If the ball remains at rest touching the grass (i.e., has rolled down the mound and is stopped by grass), is fully on the grass, or was never placed near the pitcher's mound by the umpire (e.g., the ball was given directly to the pitcher), the player who has been holding the kitty during that half of the inning does not win the kitty. Each player places another ante amount in the cup and the cup is passed to the next player in the passing order; the kitty grows.
- The starting player is the person closest to the aisle.
  - To ensure a more random starting position for the cup, the cup is passed to the next person in the passing order for each batter faced in the top of the 1st inning. Whoever is holding the cup when the third out is recorded is the first holding player; the cup is only passed one person down the passing order during subsequent half innings.
- If the game can end (e.g., the home team is leading in the top of the 9th inning or the home team is trailing/tied in the bottom of the 9th inning) and the ball will not be placed on the mound at the conclusion of the half inning, the kitty is passed to the next person in the passing order for each batter faced in that half inning (i.e., "batter-by-batter passing"). Whoever is holding the cup when the third out is recorded (or won outright, in the instance of a walk-off win) is the winner of the final kitty.
  - In rare instances, the home team can tie in the 9th inning, leading to extra innings. If batter-by-batter passing is occurring, the player holding the cup when the inning changes is eligible to keep the kitty based on the ball/mound position rules stated above. Antes continue to be placed in the cup between half innings. The cup passes to the next player in the passing order to start the 10th inning. Batter-by-batter passing does not occur in the top of the 10th since the game cannot end; the cup is passed to the next player in the passing order to start the bottom of the 10th and batter-by-batter passing resumes. This rule applies to all innings past the 9th inning.
- If the player holding the cup is not in their seat to witness whether the ball remained at rest on the dirt of the mound, other participants are under no obligation to tell the holding player and the cup may be passed to the next participant in the order without the holding player winning the kitty.

== Wrigley Field ==
The Chicago Cubs conduct a sweepstakes during every home game at Wrigley Field. Only season ticket holders are eligible to participate. In between the third and fourth inning of every Chicago Cubs home game, the home plate umpire rolls a baseball toward the pitching mound. If the baseball stays within the dirt of the pitcher’s mound, the potential winner, selected prior to the beginning of the game, will be contacted. If the baseball rolls from the mound to the grass, the prize money of $1,000 will be added to the winnings for the next Chicago Cubs home game.
