= Operation Community Shield =

U.S. law enforcement initiative

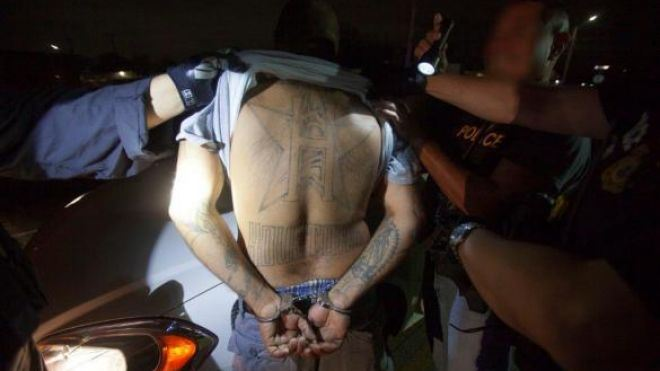
- ICE arresting a suspected gang member as part of Project Shadowfire in 2016
- Date: February 2005 – present
- Location: United States of America
- Outcome: Ongoing

Operation Community Shield is an ongoing multi-agency law enforcement initiative targeting violent gang members and their associates involved in the illegal drug and human trafficking industries in the United States. Since its launch by U.S. Immigration and Customs Enforcement (ICE) in February 2005, Homeland Security Investigations (HSI) and other participating federal, state and local law enforcement agencies have made more than 40,000 gang-related arrests, including 451 gang leaders, representing more than 2,400 different gangs and organizations, and have seized more than 8,000 guns in multiple projects.

== National Gang Unit ==
HSI's National Gang Unit (NGU) is a critical part of ICE's mission to bring the fight to transnational criminal gangs. The NGU identifies and develops intelligence on gang membership, associations, activities and international movements. It also deters, disrupts gang operations by tracing and seizing cash, weapons and other assets derived from illicit activities.

NGU leverages its anti-gang initiative called Operation Community Shield to enhance U.S. public safety. The unit develops strategic domestic and foreign law enforcement partnerships and utilizes those partnerships, along with all of its unique legal authorities to target gangs, to suppress violence and prosecute criminal enterprises.

== Overview ==
Operation Community Shield investigators perform the following duties:

- Works with federal, state and local law enforcement partners, in the United States and abroad, to develop a comprehensive and integrated approach to conducting criminal investigations and other law enforcement operations against gangs.
- Identifies violent street gangs and develops intelligence on their membership, associates, criminal activities and international movements.
- Deters, disrupts and dismantles gang operations by tracing and seizing cash, weapons and other assets derived from criminal activities.
- Seeks prosecution and/or removal of alien gang members from the United States.
- Works closely with our attaché offices worldwide and foreign law enforcement counterparts in gathering intelligence, sharing information and conducting coordinated enforcement operations.
- HSI special agents routinely investigate these crimes side-by-side with law enforcement partners in pursuit of racketeering influenced and corrupt organization (RICO), violent crime in aid of racketeering (VICAR) and Hobbs Act prosecutions in order to most effectively disrupt and dismantle criminal enterprises.

== Projects ==
Operation Community Shield projects include:

- Project Big Freeze: 2010 drug trafficking investigation
- Project Southern Tempest: 2010-11 drug trafficking investigation
- Project Nefarious: 2012 human trafficking investigation
- Project Southbound: 2014 investigation of the Sureños
- Project Wildfire: 2015 investigation of various drug and human trafficking organizations
- Project Shadowfire: 2016 investigation of various drug and human trafficking organizations

== See also ==
- Mexican drug war
- Illegal immigration to the United States
- Immigrant surveillance
