= RTS.FM =

Russian internet radio station

- Website type: Internet radio
- Available in: Russian, English
- Website: www.rts.fm
- Commercial: No

RTS.FM is an international Internet radio station headquartered in Moscow. Launched in 2006, the radio station is centered around club music created by both Russian and international musicians/DJs, focusing on tech house, minimal house, minimal techno and wider electronica. Live audio/video performances of artists are broadcast daily from RTS studios online, with the rest of the programming consisting of previous performances and DJ mixes on the station.

== Main services ==
RTS.FM is a thematic network community, united by the "club" principle. The main services of the site are open to a wide Internet audience and include:

- A directory of biographies of musicians, containing links to their performances on air of RTS.FM
- Catalog of releases by station artists (usually on vinyl)
- Calendar of upcoming performances
- Announcement of partners' offline and online events.

Registration on the site is provided by the system of invites. Additional services become available to users after receiving the invitation and registration:

- Photo album (within the personal page — user profile)
- Rating system of musicians and their performances
- Ability to view video and download audio recordings of past performances on request
- Ability to send 5 invitations to the site to friends (with the increased contribution to the site's activities, user is given the opportunity to invite additional members to the community).

Listening to the Internet radio station is possible both through the media player and directly on the page in a web browser. Users can also watch and listen to live and recorded performances via an offline player (powered by AIR technology) or an add-on for Firefox. The RTS.FM media content is relayed by the 44100.COM and DJ.RU music web portals and also by a number of local network providers.

== History ==
=== 2006 ===
The project was launched in 2006. The first version of the internet radio-station was accessible at the address www.radiotochka.net. Dmitry Green, author of the project was inspired by Deepmix and the idea of broadcasting live performances via a webcam. He decided to create such a resource for himself, as a side project and a hobby. The station was not designed as a commercial project.

=== 2009 ===
After almost three years of operation, on September 11, 2009, a new version of the station was released. The official opening took place in the Moscow club "Propaganda" at a special party. At the same time, the Russian and English versions of the site were launched.

== Current activities ==
As of February 1, 2011, more than 19 thousand users registered on the site, more than 350 artists performed at RTS.FM studios. The content of the station has thousands of videos — recordings of broadcasts, interviews, performances, training programs. International expansion continues, the opening of the RTS.fm Studio in Canada was announced.

The radio station collaborates with Russian and foreign music labels and artists. As an art project, it promotes young performers, united around itself a community of DJs, musicians and VJs who became station residents. The audience of the station is 60% Russian. Many musicians are users of the site and communicate with listeners, as well as, for example, on Myspace.

== Awards ==
=== 2008 ===
- Primeshow Agency award — nominee in the category "Internet radio station of the year" (as Radiotochka.ru).

=== 2009 ===
- Russian Dance Music Awards — nominee in the category "dance music media of the year".
- Runet Prize — winner in the category "Culture and mass communications", noted as "the First interactive radio in Russia" (Первое интерактивное радио в России).
