= Virtual Eye =

Animation studio in New Zealand

Virtual Eye, the sports division of Animation Research Limited (ARL), specialises in real time sports animations. Based in Dunedin, New Zealand, the company provides its services to a wide range of sports and sports organisations around the world.

Most widely known for its real time sailing graphics package, Virtual Eye is also involved in golf, cricket, motorsport, and a variety of air sports.

== See also ==
- Hawk-Eye
