= Operation Return to Sender =

2006 American immigration raids

- Part of Secure Communities
- Operation name: Operation Return to Sender
- Part of: Secure Communities
- Type: Illegal immigration dragnet

Participants
- Executed by: U.S. Immigration and Customs Enforcement (ICE), U.S. Postal Inspection Service (USPIS)

Mission
- Target: Illegal immigrants who had been convicted of crimes in the United States
- Objective: Identifying, arresting, and deporting illegal immigrants who had committed crimes, ignored final orders of deportation, or re-entered the country after being deported.

Timeline
- Date end: April 2007
- Date executed: May 26, 2006

Results
- Arrests: 23,000

Operation Return to Sender is the name for a massive sweep of illegal immigrants by the U.S. Immigration and Customs Enforcement (ICE) agency that began on May 26, 2006.

According to ICE, the campaign has focused on individuals deemed to be the most dangerous, including convicted felons and gang members, particularly those of the notorious Mara Salvatrucha (MS-13) gang, as well as repeat offenders, some of whom had already been deported. As of late April 2007, over 23,000 illegal immigrants had been arrested.

== Overview ==
On Sept. 19, 2006 ICE conducted a sting operation and arrested 11 immigrants in Danbury, Connecticut who came to be known as "The Danbury 11." A federal agent disguised himself as a contractor and enlisted the men to work on a construction site before handing them over to ICE. 9 of the 11 were later released on bail. In January 2007, due to a major push within Operation Return to Sender, raids in the Los Angeles Metro area netted 338 illegal immigrants who were arrested at their homes and apartments and 423 who were identified in area jails since Jan. 17. Those already jailed will be transferred to federal custody when they finish serving their state sentences, said Virginia Kice, spokeswoman for U.S. Immigration and Customs Enforcement.

The sweep netted illegal immigrants from 14 countries in all, including Mexico, Honduras, Ukraine, India, Japan, Poland and Trinidad and Tobago.

An ICE press release from June 14, 2006 claims that Operation Return to Sender ended June 13, 2006 and brought in "More Than 2,100 Criminal Aliens, Gang Members, Fugitives and Other Immigration Violators". However, this is contradicted by numerous citations that the operation is ongoing, including one from the Contra Costa Times newspaper dated March 9, 2007, which quotes ICE as having arrested 13,000 more people from mid-June 2006 through January 2007, and also outlines the ACLU of Northern California's involvement in filing FOIA requests to find out more information about how ICE is conducting this operation. Raids in Marin County, California under "Return To Sender" occurred in early March 2007, showing that the operation continues. On June 6, 2007 ICE arrested 29 individuals in New Haven, Connecticut as part of Operation Return to Sender and arrested a few days later in nearby North Haven. Some of these individuals had no criminal or immigration history.

== See also ==
- Illegal immigration to the United States
