= Snickometer =

Audio-based review system in cricket

A typical "snick" shown in the Snickometer display.

Snickometer, commonly known as Snicko, was a system used in cricket to determine whether the ball edged (Note: "Edge" being a synonym for "nick" or "snick", hence the origin of the name.) the bat, for a potential dismissal such as a catch or leg before wicket. It does this by showing a frame-by-frame replay of the footage of the ball passing the bat alongside a waveform displaying the soundwave of an oscilloscope connected to a sensitive microphone near the stumps. The newer version currently in use is called Real-Time Snickometer (RTS) and does not need to be manually synchronized for every piece of footage, making the process much faster. It was initially used for the broadcast team to attempt to determine whether the ball hit the bat and therefore if the umpire gave the correct decision. It is now also used for DRS reviews when the third umpire needs to determine whether the ball hit the bat, such as for when a ball is caught behind and the batsman might have edged the ball, or in the case of leg before wicket, where the batsman is not out lbw if the ball has hit the bat (or glove) before it hit their body. It is used for this purpose in tandem with Hot Spot. It was invented by English computer scientist Allan Plaskett in the mid-1990s. The snickometer was introduced by Channel 4 in the UK, who also introduced the Hawk-Eye and the Red Zone, in 1999.

== Uses ==
The Snickometer is used in a slow motion television replay by the third umpire or broadcasters to determine if the cricket ball touched the cricket bat. The soundwave appears next to the slow motion, frame-by-frame replay. If there is a sound of leather on willow, which is usually a short, sharp sound producing a sharp waveform, in synchrony with the ball passing the bat, then the ball is deemed to have hit the bat. If the spike on the waveform comes too late or early, it is determined that the spike was not caused by the ball hitting the bat. Other sounds such as the ball hitting the batsman's pads, or the bat hitting the pitch, and so on, tend to have a less sharp shape on the sound waveform, so it can be determined with some accuracy what contact made the sound.

When the Decision Review System (DRS) was introduced to test cricket, initially Snicko was not considered accurate enough, and so another edge-detecting tool, Hot Spot, was used. In 2013, an improved Snicko called the Real-Time Snickometer, which was more reliable and faster to use, was used for first time for DRS in the 2013–14 Ashes series.

== Drawbacks ==
The system relies on users to tell the difference between a contact between bat and ball, and other contact which has a more flat waveform such as bat on pad or ball on pad. It is easier to tell where the ball contacted precisely with Hot Spot, but that system has the disadvantage of needing a clear angle, which is sometimes obstructed by a fielder or umpire.

== See also ==
- Cricket clothing and equipment
- Laws of cricket
