= Hot Spot (cricket) =

Infrared imaging system using in cricket

A typical example of a Hot Spot display: the white "spot" on the edge of the bat indicates that it was struck by the ball (moving from right to left).

Hot Spot is an infrared imaging system used in cricket to determine whether the ball has struck the batsman, bat, or pad. Hot Spot requires two infrared cameras on opposite sides of the ground above the field of play that are continuously recording an image. Any suspected nick or bat/pad event can be verified by examining the infrared image, which usually shows a bright spot where contact friction from the ball has elevated the local temperature. Where referrals to an off-field third umpire are permitted, the technology is used to enhance the on-field umpire's decision-making accuracy. Where referrals are not permitted, the technology is used primarily as an analytical aid for television coverage.

== Use ==
The system's principal application in cricket is in deciding whether the ball has struck the batsman's bat or pad – this determination being critical in determining if a batsman is out or not on appeal for lbw or caught.

In considering whether a batsman is out, it can be difficult when the ball strikes the bat and is then caught by a member of the fielding team. It can also be caught in front of the stumps when the ball hits the pad. One of the most difficult decisions is whether the ball struck the pad or bat only. Or, if it struck both, whether the pad or the bat was struck first. If the ball strikes the bat only, or strikes the bat followed by the pad, then the batsman could be out caught but not lbw. If the ball strikes the pad in front of the stumps or inline with the stumps, then the batsman could be out lbw but not caught. Also, if the ball strikes the pad followed by the bat, then the batsman could be out lbw or out caught if a fielder catches the ball. The batsman's bat and pad are often close together, and it can be very hard to determine by eye which was struck first, whereas the hotspot technology can often resolve the question.

Hot-spot imagery is also used to show which part of the cricket bat hit the ball, as ideally the batsmen try to "middle" the ball, i.e., hit it where the sweet spot lies. Hot spot cameras provide some valuable information while analyzing the strokes played by a batsman.

== Mechanism ==
Hot Spot uses two infrared cameras positioned at either end of the ground. These cameras sense and measure heat from friction generated by a collision, such as ball on pad, ball on bat, ball on ground or ball on glove. Using a subtraction technique, a series of black-and-white negative frames are generated into a computer, precisely localizing the ball's point of contact.

== History ==
Hot Spot uses technology developed in the military for tank and jet fighter tracking. The technology was adapted for television by BBG Sports, the Australian company responsible for the Snickometer. The technology was first used during the first Test match of the 2006–07 Ashes at the Gabba on 23 November 2006.

The International Cricket Council announced that Hot Spot images would be available for use as part of its ongoing technology trial during the second and third Tests (March 2009) in South Africa. The system was to be available to the third umpire in the event of a player referral.

For the 2012 season, BBG Sport introduced a new generation of Hot Spot using high-performance SLX-Hawk thermal imaging cameras provided by UK-based Selex ES (part of Italian-owned defence contractor Finmeccanica, later renamed Leonardo S.p.A.). These cameras provided sharper images with improved sensitivity and much less motion blur than earlier Hot Spot technologies. As a result, the upgraded Hot Spot system was able to detect much finer edge nicks than in previous seasons, essentially ending all earlier doubts about the capability of the technology. Following the success of this updated Hot Spot system, BBG Sport and Selex signed an exclusivity agreement for the supply of SLX-Hawk cameras for Hot Spot in cricket and other sports.
