= Prison gangs in the United States =

A prison gang is an inmate organization that operates within a prison system, that has a corporate entity, exists into perpetuity, and whose membership is restrictive, mutually exclusive, and often requires a lifetime commitment. Political scientist David Skarbek argues the emergence of prison gangs are due to the dramatic increase in the prison population and inmate's demand for safety. Skarbek observes that in a small, homogeneous environment, people can use social norms to interpret what behavior is acceptable, but a large, heterogeneous setting undermines social norms and acceptable behavior is more difficult to determine. Prison gangs are geographically and racially divided, and about 70% of prison gang members are in California and Texas. Skarbek suggests prison gangs function similar to a community responsibility system. Interactions between strangers are facilitated because you do not have to know an individual's reputation, only a gang's reputation. Some prison gangs are transplanted from the street. In some circumstances, prison gangs "outgrow" the internal world of life inside the penitentiary, and go on to engage in criminal activities on the outside. Gang umbrella organizations like the Folk Nation and People Nation have originated in prisons.

== Prison gangs ==
=== Hispanic or Latino ===
- La Eme or the Mexican Mafia: (Blue) "Eme" is the Spanish pronunciation of the letter "M," the 13th letter in the alphabet. The Mexican Mafia is composed mostly of Hispanic or Latino, although there rarely are some non-Hispanic White members (at least associates). The Mexican Mafia and the Aryan Brotherhood are allies. They work together to control prostitution, drug-running, weapons, and "hits" or murders. Eme was originally formed in 1956 in the Deuel Vocational Institute by Hispanic or Latino prisoners from the southern part of that state. It has traditionally been composed of US-born and US-raised Hispanic or Latino with "Sureños" gangs of southern California paying tribute to it. During the 1970s and 1980s, Eme in California established the model of leveraging its power in prison to control and profit from criminal activity on the street. The gangs activities fall into two categories: conventional crimes - distributing drugs, robbery, and murder, and illicit market exchange - protecting property, enforcing agreements, and handling disputes. Members of the Mexican Mafia are recognized by a "black hand" tattoo commonly found across their back, chest, leg, or neck. (photo)
- Nuestra Familia: (Red) ("Our family" in Spanish) "N," the 14th letter in the alphabet, along with the Roman numeral "XIV" is the symbol Nuestra Familia is another mostly Hispanic or Latino prison gang that is constantly at war with La Eme. It was originally formed by Northern-California- or rural-based Hispanic or Latino prisoners with "Norteños" gangs of Northern California paying tribute to it, opposing domination by La Eme which was started by and associated with Los Angeles gang members. Nuestra Familia was first established California's Soledad Prison in the 1960s.
- The Texas Syndicate: A mostly Texas-based street and prison gang that includes mostly non-White Hispanic or Latino members and does (albeit rarely) allow White Hispanic members. The Texas Syndicate, more than La Eme or Nuestra Familia, has been associated or allied with Mexican immigrant prisoners, while Eme and Familia tend to be composed of and associate with US-born or raised Hispanic or Latino.
- Mexikanemi: Also known as the Texas Mexican Mafia, is a Mexican-American prison and street gang established in the Texas Department of Criminal Justice in 1984. It functions separately from the original California Mexican Mafia, and members consider themselves primarily tied to the area of Aztlán, formerly Mexican territories in the southwestern United States. The group engages in a wide range of illegal activities including drug trafficking, loan sharking, and money laundering.
- Ñetas: a Hispanic or Latino (mainly Puerto Ricans) gang, founded in Puerto Rico and on the eastern coast of the US. Originally formed in 1970 in the Río Piedras State Penitentiary, Puerto Rico.
- Fresno Bulldogs: Mexican American street and prison gang. Fresno Bulldogs are largely conflicted with other prison gangs and are the biggest Hispanic gang in California unaffiliated with Sureños and Norteños.
- Latin Kings: Hispanic or Latino street and prison gang established in Chicago in 1954.
- The Barrio Azteca (Spanish pronunciation: [ˈbarjo asˈteka]), or Los Aztecas (pronounced [los asˈtekas]), is a Mexican-American street, and prison gang originally based in El Paso, Texas.
- Puro Tango Blast, Houstone, or Tango Blast, is a term used to collectively describe various regionally based street, and prison gangs of generally Hispanic or Latino men from major Texas cities, but mainly from the Houston, Texas area .

=== Black ===
- Most black prison gangs retain their street gang names and associations. These commonly include Rollin' sets (named after streets, i.e. Rollin' 30s, Rollin' 40s etc.) that can identify with either Blood or Crip affiliations.
- The Black Guerrilla Family represents an exception, as an originally politically based group that has a significant presence in prisons and prison politics. It was founded in 1966 at San Quentin State Prison, California by former Black Panther member George L. Jackson.
- United Blood Nation: a black street, and prison gang found on the east coast. They are rivals with the Ñetas and have ties with the Black Guerilla Family.
- Folk Nation: Founded in Midwestern and Southern states, allied with Crips, bitter rivals with the People Nation.
- People Nation: Founded in Midwestern and Southern states, allied with Bloods, bitter rivals with the Folk Nation.
- D.C. Blacks: Founded in Washington D.C. by black inmates, are allied with the Black Guerilla Family and United Blood Nation, and enemies to the Aryan Brotherhood and Mexican Mafia.
- Almighty Vice Lord Nation (AVLN): black street, and prison gang in Chicago.
- Conservative Vice Lords (CVL): A primarily black gang that originated in the St. Charles Illinois Youth Center outside Chicago. In Chicago, CVL operated primarily in the Lawndale section and used drug sales profits to continue operation and used prisons to train and recruit new members.
- Gangster Disciples: A black street, and prison gang.
- KUMI 415: Generally referred to as 415 or Kumi 415, a predominantly black prison gang that was originally formed in Folsom State Prison in the mid-1980s, and the founding members were mainly from the San Francisco Bay Area.

=== White ===
- Aryan Brotherhood: A White prison gang that originated in California's San Quentin Prison amongst White prisoners in 1964. Their emblem, "the brand", consists of a shamrock and the number 666. Other identifiers include the initials "AB", Swastikas and the sigrune. Perhaps out of their ideology and the necessity of establishing a presence among the more numerous Hispanic or Latino and black gang members, the AB has a particular reputation for ruthlessness and violence. Since the 1990s, in part because of this reputation, the AB has been targeted heavily by state and federal authorities. Many key AB members have been moved to "supermax" control-unit prisons at both the federal and state level or are under federal indictment.
- Nazi Lowriders: A newer White prison gang that emerged after many Aryan Brotherhood members were sent to the Security Housing Unit at Pelican Bay or transferred to federal prisons. NLR is associated with members originally from the Antelope Valley and is known to accept some light-skinned or White Hispanic members.
- Public Enemy No. 1: A White street and prison gang based in Southern California. They have replaced the NLR in holding the "keys" for the Aryan Brotherhood on the mainline prison population.
- Dirty White Boys: A White prison gang made up of inmates from Texas, and have a heavy presence in the federal system.
- European Kindred: a White White supremacist prison gang founded in Oregon that is affiliated with the Aryan Brotherhood (AB) and the Ku Klux Klan (KKK).
- Aryan Circle: The Aryan Circle split from the Aryan Brotherhood to maintain criminal gang status and White supremacist beliefs, and to oppose Hispanic or Latino and black prison gangs.
- Dead Man Incorporated (DMI): a predominantly White prison gang founded in the Maryland Correctional System with branches in many other correctional facilities throughout the U.S.
- Pale Kings (PK): a White prison gang that originated in Pittsburgh, Pennsylvania. The Pale Kingz who also identify by the initials "PK" are primarily located within the Pennsylvania state prison system and throughout the county jails of Pennsylvania. Unlike many of the White prison gangs PK does not share the same White supremacy/White supremacist beliefs.
- Aryan Brotherhood of Texas: A White prison, and street gang. Despite the similarity of the name, the Aryan Brotherhood of Texas (ABT) does not have ties with the original Aryan Brotherhood. Founded in Texas in the 1980s, the ABT was created mainly as a criminal enterprise.
- 211 Crew
- Simon City Royals: A predominantly White street and prison gang, established in Chicago during the late 1950s.
- Soldiers of Aryan Culture: A nationwide neo-Nazi prison gang composed exclusively of White inmates.
- Universal Aryan Brotherhood: A White White power prison gang primarily based out of Oklahoma. Despite its name, this gang had no relation to the original Aryan Brotherhood.
- Chicago Gaylords: A White Chicago gang founded in the 1950s. Formerly a racist gang, though it places less emphasis on race in the present day. Allied to People Nation, one of the few White gangs to do so. Still prevalent in small strongholds in north Chicago and the wider Illinois prison system.

== Latent prison management function ==
Christian Parenti argues in his book Lockdown America that prison gangs serve a convenient function for the prison establishment and officers. They help regulate rogue and rebellious elements within the prison population without intervention from prison authorities.

Parenti sees the repression dished out by gangs on non-affiliated prisoners as a latent function of prison gangs. Thus, gangs are often more-or-less tolerated by prison administrators due to the side-benefits they afford.

== US prison gangs in fiction ==
- Sons of Anarchy
- Oz
- Blood In Blood Out
- American Me
- American History X
- Felon
- Shot Caller
- The Butterfly Effect
- Animal Factory
- Law & Order (season 15)
- My Name is Earl (season 3)

Escape from Alcatraz

== See also ==
- Incarceration in the United States
- Gangs in the United States
- Identity politics
