= Universal Aryan Brotherhood =

White supremacist prison gang in the United States

- Founded: 1993
- Founder: Wilhelm Mast
- Founding location: Oklahoma Department of Corrections
- Years active: 1993–present
- Territory: Federal Prison system, Oklahoma, Colorado, Kansas, Texas, and California
- Ethnicity: European Americans
- Membership: 3,000+
- Activities: Racketeering, kidnapping, murder, drug trafficking home invasion, carjacking, and money laundering
- Allies: Aryan Brotherhood of Mississippi
- Rivals: Aryan Circle; Oklahoma Irish Mob Gang

The Universal Aryan Brotherhood (UAB), also known as the Universal Family, are an active neo-Nazi white supremacist prison gang in the United States. Primarily based out of Oklahoma, the gang also has members in federal custody, as well as in several states across the country.

The UAB modeled itself after the principles and ideologies of the original Aryan Brotherhood prison gang, but despite the similar name, the Universal Aryan Brotherhood has no connection to said gang. It is also unrelated to the United Aryan Brotherhood (also based in Oklahoma).

== Background ==
The Universal Aryan Brotherhood are one of the many white supremacist prison gangs across the United States. Much like the Aryan Brotherhood of Texas and the Soldiers of Aryan Culture, the UAB operates both inside and outside of prison walls.

Members of the UAB identify themselves through distinctive criminal tattoos, as well as red and black clothing The gang's particular insignia consists of a dual set of sig runes adopted from the infamous Schutzstaffel, which is also used by many other unrelated white power groups and neo-Nazi organizations. An additional expression used by the Universal Aryan Brotherhood is the numerical code "2112" (also written as "21-12"), referencing the 21st letter of the alphabet, 'u' for 'universal', in combination with the first and second letters of the alphabet (1, 2) which each correspond to 'a' and 'b' for 'Aryan' and 'Brotherhood'. Likewise, some UAB members sport tattoos of the letters "T.T.B.B.E", an acronym for the phrase "Till The Bitter Bloody End". Another acronymic slogan used by the gang is "U.F.F.U.", meaning "Universal Forever, Forever Universal".

Two distinct subsets of the UAB exist: UAB 21 WoodGrain and the UAB Universal Family.

== Organization and structure ==
Membership is exclusive to white prisoners. Members, who often refer to themselves as "Universal Soldiers", adhere to militaristic rules.

Universal Aryan Brotherhood’s top echelon, known as the Main Council, directs gang activities and controls sub-councils in smaller prisons. Most of the Main Council members are imprisoned inside the maximum-security Oklahoma State Penitentiary-McAlester.

The UAB recruits by offering protection to white inmates in return for joining the gang. In order to be considered for UAB membership, a prisoner is required to be sponsored by a fully initiated member. Said sponsoring UAB member would then be responsible for conducting a background investigation of the prospect as a way of ensuring that he was not a sex offender, a law enforcement cooperator, or otherwise undesirable for gang membership.

According to the United States Department of Justice, the gang uses cell phones that have been smuggled inside Oklahoma prisons to orchestrate criminal activities on the outside.

== Criminal activities ==
The Universal Aryan Brotherhood has been involved in numerous violent crimes ranging from kidnapping to murder. Like many similar white supremacist gangs, its primary source of income is through the production and distribution of drugs – primarily, methamphetamine, but also oxycodone and marijuana. Additional activities include carjackings, assaults, armed robberies and murders.

=== Kidnappings ===
In an effort to expand UAB’s power and operations throughout Oklahoma, a series of multiple kidnappings were ordered and commenced. These kidnappings were also used as a way to further the gang's illegal activities and as a intimidation tactic against rivals.

=== Murder of Sufeng He ===
In 2011, Chinese-American University of Tulsa student Sufeng He was shot and killed in an attempted carjacking by UAB member Billy Joe Hammons following a police pursuit from a subsequent crime spree that Hammons had engaged in. After Sufeng He was gunned down, Hammons exchanged gunfire with local police and was fatally shot.

=== Torture and murder of Jared Langworthy ===
On December 7, 2019, UAB member Jared Langworthy was bashed with baseball bats, tortured, and thrown in a pond by a total of seven fellow gang members, allegedly over the destruction of an air conditioning unit that occurred during a fight with his girlfriend. Langworthy's gang tattoo was forcibly burned off his shoulder during the attack. Due to the severity of the beating, the inflicted injuries were fatal.

=== Additional killings ===
- In May 2012, UAB prospect Grant Curry beat former motorcycle gang member and admitted drug trafficker Anthony Mollman to death for cooperating with law enforcement. The murder was caught on a surveillance videotape and depicts a total of seven inmates helping carry out the crime.
- According to a RICO indictment, James Mask was assaulted by a Universal Aryan Brotherhood member on orders from the UAB main council. The assault resulted in Mask's death.
- In 2005, African-American inmate Donald Jones was stabbed to death and was beheaded, gouged heart out at Oklahoma State Reformatory by Johnny R. Jameson along with an additional member of the Universal Aryan Brotherhood. The attack was commenced in retaliation against black inmates for the death of another UAB member, Adam Lippert.
- Acting on orders from the UAB main council, Blake Ford was beaten to death on July 29, 2009.
- Sometime around September 2015, 6 members of the rival Irish Mob, a notorious Irish-American organized crime group, were killed beheaded, dismembered by Universal Aryan Brotherhood gang members in part of an ongoing war between both gangs.
- In 2022, an Oklahoma State Bureau of Investigation investigation discovered at least 12 dismembered bodies of human remains from properties owned by Universal Aryan Brotherhood leader Mikell Patrick "Bulldog" Smith in Logan County and Oklahoma County.

== See also ==
- prison gangs in the United States
- 211 Crew
- Texas Syndicate
- Dead Man Incorporated
- Black Guerrilla Family
