= Peckerwood =

Ethnic slur for White people

Peckerwood gang network
- Prison gangs: 211 Crew (CO, TX); Aryan Brotherhood (CA; statewide, AZ, AL, GA, LA, FL); Aryan Brotherhood of Texas (TX; NM, OK); Aryan Circle (TX); European Kindred (OR); Nazi Lowriders (CA; AZ, NV, TX); Peckerwood street gangs: European Kindred (OR); Nazi Lowriders (CA, TX); Public Enemy No. 1 (CA)

Peckerwood is a US racial epithet used against white people, especially poor rural Whites. Originally an ethnic slur, the term has been reclaimed by a subculture related to prison gangs and outlaw motorcycle clubs. The term was in use as an inversion of woodpecker in the Southern United States by the 1830s; it is also with the sense referring to white people documented from the 1850s. African-American folklore in the 1920s contrasted the white "peckerwood" bird with the African-American blackbird. The word became a common term in Jive.

== History ==
Use of the term, an inversion of woodpecker, dates to the early 19th century. The Oxford English Dictionary traces the earliest printed use to an Alabama newspaper in 1835. Peckerwood was in use in reference to white people by 1859; it often suggested a white person who was rustic or poor. The shortened form peck was in use in the same sense in the 1920s. In African American folklore during the 1920s, the woodpecker symbolically represented White Americans, in contrast to the blackbird that represented African Americans.

== Subculture ==
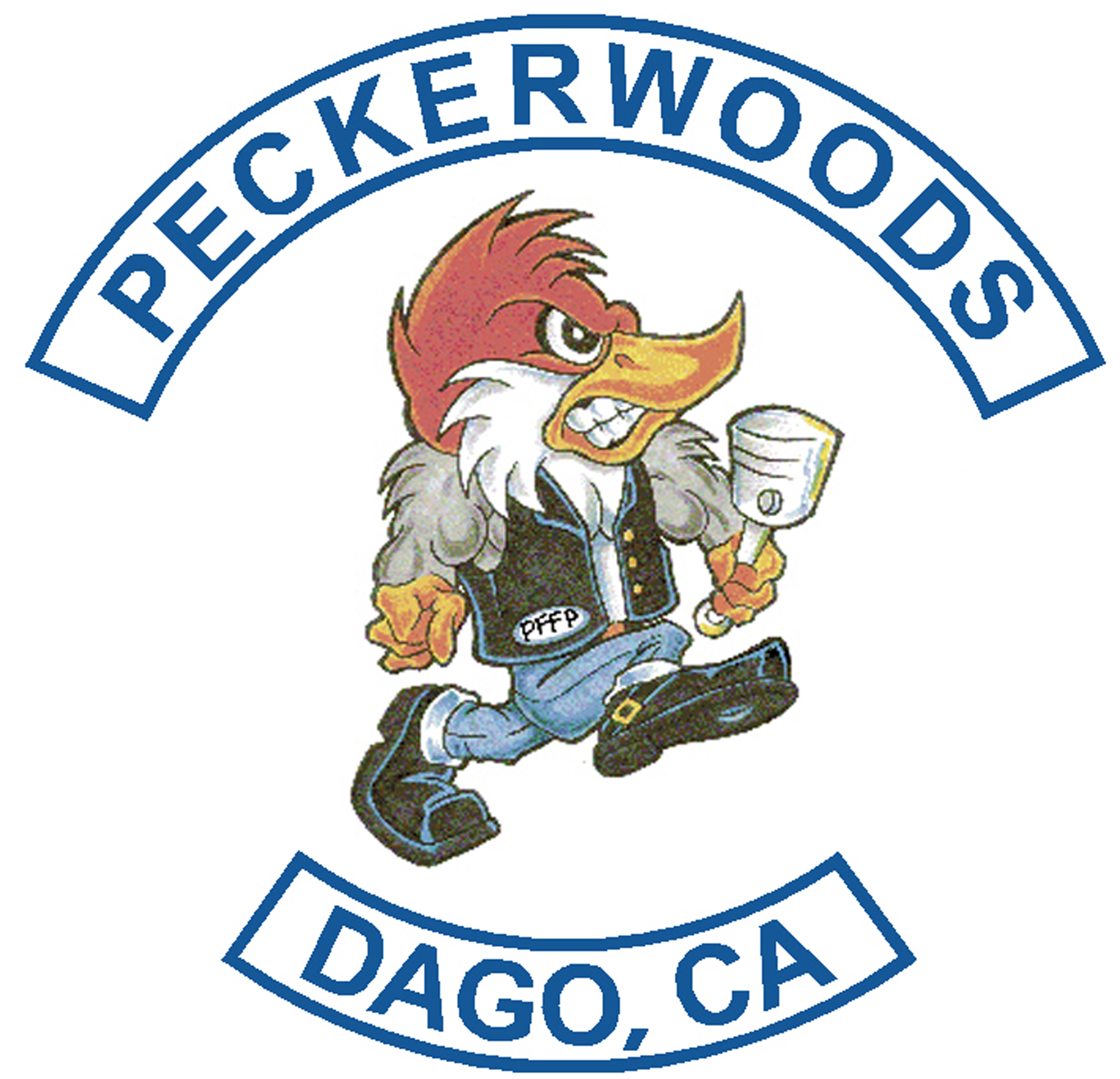
Peckerwood DAGO gang's logo

Historically, the term "peckerwood" was commonly applied to white prisoners in general. The cemetery at Leavenworth Penitentiary, officially known as Mount Hope, is informally known as "Peckerwood Hill" by prisoners and guards. In the later half of the 20th century the term narrowed to apply to a white subculture associated with street gangs and prison gangs, such as the Aryan Brotherhood. This subculture is also known as PW, P-Dub, or collectively as "the Woodpile". Men in this group are called "peckerwoods" and women "featherwoods". The woodpecker is often used as a general symbol for the group, such as in prison tattoos. It is usually drawn with a long beak, sometimes drawn to resemble Woody Woodpecker or Mr. Horsepower. Sometimes the letters "PW" or "APW" (Peckerwood and American Peckerwood) are used.

The term is also used for entry-level recruits of the Aryan Brotherhood. Within the prison system, peckerwoods may advance in the social hierarchy and become formal members of the gang, or similar gangs such as the Nazi Lowriders. Becoming a higher-ranking member involves the act of committing more and more serious crimes. Peckerwood is also used by some prison systems as a generic name for any white supremacist threat group, which has sometimes been a source of confusion. In and out of prison, the peckerwood subculture is most common in California, Texas and the U.S. South and Southwest, but less in the Midwest and Northeast.

Much of the peckerwood prison subculture had its beginnings in the desegregation of United States prisons. Aryan Brotherhood had its beginnings in the San Quentin State Prison in 1964 as a response to the newly formed black prison gang Black Guerilla Family. The San Quentin State Aryan Brotherhood uses the gang Family Affiliated Irish Mafia (FAIM) for its street-operated activity. The Aryan Brotherhood of Texas was formed in the 80s after the dismantling of the "building tender" system in which groups were segregated. ABT originally formed as a hybrid of the two gangs Aryan Society and Aryan Brothers.

In 1985, the Aryan Circle formed out of peckerwoods who did not join the newly formed Aryan Brotherhood of Texas. Aryan Circle members believed ABT did not truly stand for white supremacy. Fronted by Mark "Cowboy" Gaspard, the group was originally called Aryan Christians but changed its name due to members' varying beliefs. A group known as the "International Peckerwood Syndicate" has been listed by in the Oregon Department of Justice as operating in Oregon prisons. According to the ADL, the group, also known as the "Insane Peckerwood Syndicate", formed in 2005 and also has a presence in Washington state. Other prison gangs using the term "peckerwood" as part of their name have been documented in Connecticut, Minnesota, Missouri, Nebraska, Nevada, New Mexico.

On May 4, 2013, Charles Gaskin, who was a member of the gang according to his probation report, was sentenced for 26 years to life for the murder of registered sex offender Neil Lee Hayes. According to the report, Gaskin was required to physically harm a white person with a history of child molestation under "peckerwood law".

=== Street gangs ===
The peckerwood subculture has established street gangs that mix elements from white power skinhead culture and conventional street gang activity, such as illegal drugs. These "Peckerwood" street gangs generally form in lower-income white neighborhoods. These gangs are the manifestation of a modern "white power" subculture that combines the elements of California Latino culture, extreme sports and cannabis subculture. Stylistically these gangs combine elements of Latino gang culture (Pendleton flannel and baggy pants) and skinhead culture (Doc Marten boots, bomber jackets, and shaved heads). As well, Peckerwood gang members identify with the color white and are known for wearing white caps and handkerchiefs. The most common gang sign for Peckerwoods is forming the thumb, index finger and middle finger of the right hand to form the letter "P," and the four fingers of the left to form the letter "W".

Many of these Peckerwood gangs in California are subservient to the authority of Nazi Lowriders, which includes the punk gangs Vicious Circle and La Mirada Punks, as well as Insane White Boys, Independent Skins, Orange County Skins, and a rigid alliance with Southern California Skinhead Alliance (SoCal Skins). Leading the alliance with Nazi Lowriders, the Peckerwood gang Public Enemy No. 1 (PEN1) was established in Long Beach, California during the late 80s, and known for recruiting middle-class "latchkey kids" within the Southern California punk scene. PEN1 also known by its derivative Peni Death Squad, gained establishment as a Peckerwood gang in the late 90s in Orange County, being recruited by the Nazi Lowriders. Members of PEN1 also established a regional chapter of the straight edge street gang FSU (Fuck Shit Ups) in Huntington Beach as well. In 1993, the gang Insane White Boys (IWB) was incepted in Orange County and came into prominence being recruited by the Nazi Lowriders as well. The smaller gangs such as Public Enemy No. 1 and Insane White Boys are considered "kids" within the Peckerwood gang world, where as Nazi Lowrider groups are led by "seniors" who induct "kids" into membership. A kid can become a "junior", and a junior can become a senior if elected by three other seniors.

Within the U.S. court system, membership within a Peckerwood group has not always been accepted as indicating the existence of a larger Peckerwood gang. Peckerwood groups tend to lack a constitution, and to be more loosely organized than formal gangs. The Smalltown Peckerwoods, a gang of about a hundred members on the U.S. West Coast, was not ruled to be part of a larger Peckerwood organization in the 2008 People v. Williams case, as the main commonalities were ideology and the name, rather than organizational. Peckerwood Motorcycle Club is also the name of a Santee, California-based outlaw motorcycle club formed in 1987. According to local police, the club's patches and clothing include Nazi imagery, and members have been associated with hate crimes, although the club has denied that it is racist.
