= Gangland (TV series) =

American television series

- Country of origin: United States
- No. of seasons: 7
- No. of episodes: 87 + 1 Special

Production
- Running time: 47 minutes

Original release
- Network: History Channel
- Release: November 1, 2007 – September 24, 2010

Gangland is a television series that aired on the History Channel. Gangland explores the history of some of America's most notorious gangs. It premiered on November 1, 2007, and ended on September 24, 2010. The theme song was performed by rapper Buckshot of the Boot Camp Clik.

== Episodes ==
=== Series overview ===
Season	Episodes	Originally aired	
Season	Episodes	Season premiere	Season finale
1	13 + Special	November 1, 2007	January 31, 2008
2	12	March 13, 2008	June 12, 2008
3	12	September 12, 2008	December 4, 2008
4	12	February 5, 2009	April 30, 2009
5	12	May 28, 2009	August 13, 2009
6	13	November 5, 2009	April 30, 2010
7	13	May 7, 2010	September 24, 2010

=== Season 1 (2007–08) ===
Ep #	Title	Gang	Airdate
0	"Aryan Brotherhood "	Aryan Brotherhood in the California federal prison system	June 24, 2007
1	"American Gangster"	The Council in New York City, NY	November 1, 2007
2	"You Rat, You Die"	MS-13 in Northern Virginia	November 8, 2007
3	"Code of Conduct"	Mexican Mafia in Los Angeles, CA	November 15, 2007
4	"Behind Enemy Lines"	Hells Angels in the West Coast	November 28, 2007
5	"Race Wars"	Bloods, Crips and Sureños in Los Angeles, CA	December 8, 2007
6	"Kings of New York"	Latin Kings in New York City, NY	December 13, 2007
7	"Stone to the Bone"	Almighty Black P. Stone Nation in Chicago, IL	December 20, 2007
8	"Hate Nation"	White Aryan Resistance in Portland, OR and Hammerskins in Temecula, CA	December 27, 2007
9	"Gangster City"	Gangster Disciples in Chicago, IL	January 3, 2008
10	"Blood In, Blood Out"	Nuestra Familia and Norteños in Salinas, CA	January 10, 2008
11	"Basic Training"	Gang presence in the United States Armed Forces	January 17, 2008
12	"Blood Oath"	United Blood Nation in New York City, NY	January 24, 2008
13	"Root of All Evil"	MS-13 in Los Angeles, CA	January 31, 2008

=== Season 2 (2008) ===
Ep #	Title	Gang	Airdate
14 (1)	"Maniacal"	Maniac Latin Disciples in Chicago, IL	March 13, 2008
15 (2)	"Deadly Triangle"	Hop Sing Boys, Wah Ching and Wo Hop To in San Francisco, CA	March 20, 2008
16 (3)	"Biker Wars"	Outlaws in Chicago, IL and the rest of the Midwest	March 27, 2008
17 (4)	"Texas Terror"	Texas Syndicate in Austin, TX	April 3, 2008
18 (5)	"Crip or Die"	Crips in Los Angeles, CA	April 10, 2008
19 (6)	"Lords of the Holy City"	Vice Lords in Chicago, IL	May 1, 2008
20 (7)	"Murder by Numbers"	18th Street Gang in Los Angeles, CA	May 8, 2008
21 (8)	"Mongol Nation"	Mongols in Los Angeles, CA	May 15, 2008
22 (9)	"Gangster, Inc."	Gangster Disciples in Chicago, IL and Milwaukee, WI	May 22, 2008
23 (10)	"One Blood"	Bloods in Los Angeles and Pasadena, CA	May 29, 2008
24 (11)	"Sin City"	Hybrid gangs in Las Vegas, NV	June 5, 2008
25 (12)	"From Girl to Gangster"	Female Bloods and Crips in Compton, CA	June 12, 2008

=== Season 3 (2008) ===
Ep #	Title	Gang	Airdate
26 (01)	"Death in Dixie"	La Gran Familia in Atlanta, GA	September 12, 2008
27 (02)	"California Killing Fields"	Tiny Rascals Gangsters in Fresno, CA	September 19, 2008
28 (03)	"The Devil's Playground"	Satan Disciples in Chicago, IL	September 26, 2008
29 (04)	"Blood in the Streets"	Los Solidos in Hartford, CT	October 3, 2008
30 (05)	"From Heaven to Hell"	Crips in Salt Lake City, UT	October 10, 2008
31 (06)	"Bandido Army"	Bandidos in San Antonio, TX	October 17, 2008
32 (07)	"Menace of Destruction"	Menace of Destruction in Twin Cities, MN	October 24, 2008
33 (08)	"Rage Against Society"	Friends Stand United in Boston, MA	October 31, 2008
34 (09)	"Paid in Blood"	Warlocks in Orlando, FL	November 7, 2008
35 (10)	"Die, Snitch, Die"	Gotti Boyz in New Orleans, LA	November 21, 2008
36 (11)	"To Torture or to Kill?"	Los Zetas in Laredo–Nuevo Laredo	November 28, 2008
37 (12)	"All Hell Breaks Loose"	Zoe Pound in Miami, FL	December 4, 2008

=== Season 4 (2009) ===
Ep #	Title	Gang	Airdate
38 (01)	"Highway to Hell"	The Avenues in Los Angeles, CA	February 5, 2009
39 (02)	"Devil's Fire"	Pagans in Philadelphia, Pennsylvania	February 12, 2009
40 (03)	"Divide and Conquer"	Latin Kings in Chicago, IL	February 19, 2009
41 (04)	"Kill 'Em All"	Best Friends in Detroit, MI	Monday, March 2, 2009
42 (05)	"Kill or Be Killed"	Love Murdering Gangsters in Memphis, TN	March 12, 2009
43 (06)	"Boys of Destruction"	Boys of Destruction in St. Louis, MO	March 19, 2009
44 (07)	"Aryan Terror"	Aryan Brotherhood of Texas in Dallas, TX and the Texas federal prison system	March 26, 2009
45 (08)	"Silent Slaughter"	Sons of Silence in Colorado Springs, CO	April 2, 2009
46 (09)	"Killing Snitches"	Hidden Valley Kings in Charlotte, NC	April 9, 2009
47 (10)	"Everybody Killers"	Hoover Criminals in Portland, OR	April 16, 2009
48 (11)	"Dead Man Inc."	Dead Man Incorporated in Baltimore, MD and the Maryland federal prison system	April 23, 2009
49 (12)	"Biker Wars II"	Hells Angels and Mongols in San Francisco, CA	April 30, 2009

=== Season 5 (2009) ===
"Ice Cold Killers" is not included on the DVD release.

Ep #	Title	Gang	Airdate
50 (01)	"Ice Cold Killers"	Crips in Anchorage, AK	May 28, 2009
51 (02)	"Klan of Killers"	Imperial Klans of America in Louisville, KY	June 4, 2009
52 (03)	"Machete Slaughter"	Trinitarios in New York City, NY	June 11, 2009
53 (04)	"Blood River"	Barrio Azteca in El Paso, TX	June 18, 2009
54 (05)	"Hustle or Die"	Four Corner Hustlers in Chicago, IL	June 25, 2009
55 (06)	"Gangsta Killers"	Top 6 in West Palm Beach, FL	July 2, 2009
56 (07)	"The Death Head"	Hells Angels in Montreal, Canada	July 9, 2009
57 (08)	"Circle of Death"	Aryan Circle in Houston, TX	July 16, 2009
58 (09)	"Dog Fights"	Bulldogs in Fresno, CA	July 23, 2009
59 (10)	"Evil Breed"	The Breed in Philadelphia, PA	July 30, 2009
60 (11)	"Hunt and Kill"	Brown Pride in Nashville, TN	August 6, 2009
61 (12)	"Deadly Blast"	Tango Blast in Houston, TX	August 13, 2009

=== Season 6 (2009–10) ===
Neither "Mile High Killers" nor "Public Enemy Number One" are included on the DVD release. There was no break between seasons 6 and 7, the list below is based on the DVD release which ends with "Hell House".

Ep #	Title	Gang	Airdate
62 (01)	"Snitch Slaughter"	Vagos in San Bernardino County, CA	November 5, 2009
63 (02)	"Trinity of Blood"	Tri-City Bombers in Brownsville, TX	November 12, 2009
64 (03)	"Street Law"	Sur-13 in Atlanta, GA	December 3, 2009
65 (04)	"Skinhead Assault"	Volksfront in Portland, OR	December 10, 2009
66 (05)	"Crazy Killers"	South Side Lokos13 in Oklahoma City, OK	December 17, 2009
67 (06)	"Bloody South"	Gangster Killer Bloods in Columbia, SC	January 15, 2010
68 (07)	"Devils Diciples"	Devils Diciples in Detroit, MI	January 22, 2010
69 (08)	"The Assassins"	Logan Heights in San Diego, CA	February 19, 2010
70 (09)	"Mile High Killers"	North Side Mafia in Denver, CO	March 5, 2010
71 (10)	"Beware the Goose!"	Galloping Goose in Kansas City, MO	April 7, 2010
72 (11)	"Sex, Money, Murder"	Sex Money Murder in Trenton, NJ	April 14, 2010
73 (12)	"Public Enemy Number One"	Public Enemy Number One in Orange County, CA	April 21, 2010
74 (13)	"Hell House"	Sindicato Nuevo Mexico in the New Mexico federal prison system	April 30, 2010

=== Season 7 (2010) ===
Ep #	Title	Gang	Airdate
75 (1)	"Most Notorious"	Recap	May 7, 2010
76 (2)	"Vendetta of Blood"	Lincoln Park Bloods in San Diego, CA	May 14, 2010
77 (3)	"A Killer's Revenge"	Asian Boyz in Los Angeles, CA	May 21, 2010
78 (4)	"Wild Boyz"	Wild Boyz in Pine Ridge, SD	June 4, 2010
79 (5)	"Better Off Dead"	Ñetas in Trenton, NJ	June 18, 2010
80 (6)	"Capitol Killers"	MS-13 in Washington, D.C.	June 25, 2010
81 (7)	"Clash of the Crips"	Crips in New York City, NY	July 9, 2010
82 (8)	"Army of Hate"	Aryan Republican Army in Columbus, OH	August 6, 2010
83 (9)	"The Filthy Few"	Hells Angels in Seattle, WA	August 13, 2010
84 (10)	"Shoot to Kill"	F-13 in Los Angeles, CA	August 20, 2010
85 (11)	"Road Warriors"	Traveling Vice Lords in Memphis, TN	August 27, 2010
86 (12)	"Valley of Death"	New Mexican Mafia in Phoenix, AZ	September 17, 2010
87 (13)	"Death Before Dishonor"	Black Mafia Family in Atlanta, GA	September 24, 2010
