= List of symbols designated by the ADL as hate symbols =

This is a list of hate symbols, including acronyms, numbers, phrases, logos, flags, gestures and other miscellaneous symbols used for hateful purposes, according to the Anti-Defamation League in their "Hate on Display" database. Some of these items have been appropriated by hate groups and may have other, non-hate-group-related meanings, including anti-racist meanings.

== Acronyms ==
Acronym	Origins	Meaning
AKIA	Ku Klux Klan	"A Klansman I Am"
AYAK	Ku Klux Klan	"Are You A Klansman?"
FGRN	Ku Klux Klan	"For God, Race, and Nation"
GTKRWN	General white supremacy	"Gas the Kikes; Race War Now"
HFFH	Hammerskins	"Hammerskins Forever, Forever Hammerskins"
HSN	Hammerskins	"Hammerskin Nation"
ITSUB	Ku Klux Klan	"In The Sacred Unfailing Being", a reference to God
KABARK	Ku Klux Klan	"Konstantly Applied By All Regular Klansmen"
KIGY	Ku Klux Klan	"Klansman, I Greet You"
KLASP	Ku Klux Klan	"Klanish Loyalty, A Sacred Principle"
LOTIE	Ku Klux Klan	"Lady Of The Invisible Empire", in reference to a female Klan member
OFOF	Volksfront	"One Front, One Family"
ORION	General white supremacy	"Our Race Is Our Nation"
RAHOWA	Creativity (religion)	"Racial Holy War"
ROA	Volksfront	"Race Over All"
SS	Nazi Germany	"Schutzstaffel" Note: "SS" not specifically listed
SWP	Californian prison system	"Supreme White Power"
TND, TKD TMD	4chan, TikTok	"Total Nigger Death" "Total Kike Death" “Total Muslim Death”
WP	General white supremacy	"White Power" or "White Pride"
WPWW	Stormfront (website)	"White Pride Worldwide"
ZOG	Anti-Semitism	"Zionist Occupation Government"

== Numerical ==
Number	Origins	Meaning
1–11	Aryan Knights	Representing the first and eleventh letters of the alphabet, A and K, meaning "Aryan Knights"
100%	General white supremacy	"100% White"
109/110	General antisemitism	White supremacists claim that Jews have been expelled from 109 nations throughout history; by calling for the United States to expel Jews as well, they aim to make the USA the "110th". This number is sometimes combined with the numeric code 1488, creating 1488–110.
12	Aryan Brotherhood	Representing the first and second letters of the alphabet, A and B, meaning "Aryan Brotherhood"
13	Aryan Circle	Representing the first and third letters of the alphabet, A and C, meaning "Aryan Circle"
13/52 and 13/90	General white supremacy	The number 13 refers to the purported percentage of the U.S. population that is African-American. The number 52 refers to the alleged percentage of all murders committed in the U.S. that are committed by African-Americans. Some white supremacists use the number 50 instead of 52. The number 90 refers to the percentage of violent interracial crime allegedly committed by African-Americans.
14	David Lane (white supremacist)	Shorthand for the Fourteen Words, "We must secure the existence of our people and a future for white children"
14/23	General white supremacy	The Fourteen Words and 23 Precepts – rules for the Southern Brotherhood prison gang
14/88	General white supremacy	The Fourteen Words and the eighth letter of the alphabet, H, repeated twice, standing for "Heil Hitler"
18	Combat 18	Representing the first and eighth letters of the alphabet, A and H, meaning "Adolf Hitler"
21–2–12	The Unforgiven (prison gang)	Representing the twenty-first, second, and twelfth letters of the alphabet, U, B, and L, meaning "Unity, Brotherhood, Loyalty"
23/16	General white supremacy	Representing the twenty-third and sixteenth letters of the alphabet, W and P, meaning "White Power" or "White Pride"
28	Blood & Honour	Representing the second and eighth letters of the alphabet, B and H, meaning "Blood & Honour"
311	Ku Klux Klan	Representing the eleventh letter of the alphabet, K, repeated three times, meaning "Ku Klux Klan"
318	Combat 18	Representing the third letter of the alphabet, C, and 18, meaning "Combat 18"
33/6	Ku Klux Klan	The thirty-three represents three elevens, as K is the eleventh letter of the alphabet, and three of them make "KKK" – the six represents the sixth "era" of the Ku Klux Klan
38	Hammerskins	Representing the third and eighth letters of the alphabet, C and H, meaning "Crossed Hammers" a reference to the logo of the Hammerskins
43	Supreme White Alliance	If one substitutes numbers for the letters in Supreme White Alliance's initials (19, 23, 1), then adds those numbers together, the total is 43.
511	European Kindred	Representing the fifth and eleventh letters of the alphabet, E and K, meaning "European Kindred"
737	Public Enemy No. 1 (gang)	The numbers 737 correspond to the letters P, D, and S on a telephone keypad; the initials PDS stand for Peni Death Squad, another name for the group
83	Christian Identity	Representing the eighth and third letters of the alphabet, H and C, meaning "Heil Christ" or "Hail Christ"
88	General white supremacy	Representing the eighth letter of the alphabet, H, repeated twice, meaning "Heil Hitler"
9%	General white supremacy	The percentage of the world's population that is purportedly white

== Phrases ==
Phrase	Alternate phrase(s) or examples	Meaning
"Anudda Shoah"	"Anuddah Shoah"	A phrase used to mock the concept that Jewish people regularly talk about the Holocaust; "Annuda" is a spelling of "Another" as if spoken with a heavy Yiddish accent, and "Shoah" is a Hebrew word meaning "Catastrophe", and it is regularly used in reference to the Holocaust. As such, the phrase can be read as: "It's like another Holocaust!"
"Anti-Racist Is a Code for Anti-White"		A phrase implying that opponents of racism are secretly trying to eliminate white people, and that being anti-racist is no different than hating white people.
"Blue-Eyed Devils"		A racial slur originating from Asia to refer to people of European ancestry, it has been adopted by some white supremacists who began to refer to themselves as "Blue-Eyed Devils".
"Blut und Ehre"		A German phrase translating to "Blood and Honor", it was used as a political slogan by the Hitler Youth.
"Crazy White Boy"		A generic phrase used by white supremacists to identify themselves to other white supremacists.
"Day of the Rope"		A phrase referring to a fictional event in the neo-Nazi book The Turner Diaries. In the novel, the "Day of the Rope" is an event where mass lynchings took place against minorities, journalists, race-mixers and politicians, all within the span of a day.
"Diversity = White Genocide"		A slogan implying that growing cultural diversity will bring about "White Genocide".
"Early Life Check"		A supposed check to see if a person is Jewish or not by using the 'Early life' section of a biographical Wikipedia page. It is a reference to the International Jewish conspiracy
"Featherwood"		The female equivalent to a "Peckerwood", or a member of a white supremacist street or prison gang.
"Hate"	"H8"	White supremacists used the word to openly proclaim their hatred to people unlike them.
"Hate Edge"	“NS Straight edge”, “National Socialist Straight Edge”	A white supremacist offshoot of the Straight Edge movement.
"I have nothing to say"	"5 Words", "Five Words"	White supremacists claim that these five words should be the only words spoken to police officers.
"It's Okay to Be White"		A phrase originating on 4chan in 2017, it was created with the purpose of putting it on fliers to be put in public places. Originators assumed that "liberals" would react negatively to such fliers and condemn them or take them down, thus "proving" that liberals did not even think it was "okay" to be white.
"Love Your Race"		A phrase used by white supremacists to encourage racialism.
"Meine Ehre Heißt Treue"	"Unser Ehre Heißt Treue"	A German phrase translating to "My Honor is Loyalty". It was originally a motto used by the Waffen-SS.
"Muh Holocaust"		An antisemitic meme used to imply that Jewish people "whine" about the Holocaust. The word "Muh" means "My".
"Non Silba Sed Anthar"	"NSSA"	A Latin/Gothic phrase translating to "Not Self, But Others", a phrase used by the Ku Klux Klan.
"Peckerwood"		Originally a racial epithet aimed at white people, it was adopted by white supremacists. A "Peckerwood" is a member of a white supremacist street or prison gang.
"Sieg Heil"	"Hail Victory" "Victory Hail"	A German phrase translating to "Hail Victory". It was one of the most widely used slogans by the Nazi Party.
"Six Gorillion"	"Muh Six Gorillion"	A phrase making reference to the six million Jewish people killed in the Holocaust. The "million" is replaced with the nonsensical "Gorillion", implying that the number of Jewish deaths caused by the Holocaust is greatly exaggerated.
"The Goyim Know, Shut It Down!"	"Da Goyim Know"	A mocking antisemitic phrase meant to be understood as spoken by a panicked Jew responding to an occurrence that would ostensibly reveal the "Jewish plot" to manipulate non-Jewish people (A.K.A. "Goyim").
"We Wuz Kangs"	"We Wuz Kings", "Kings N Shiet"	A phrase, written as if spoken in exaggerated African-American Vernacular English, saying "We Were Kings". This phrase mocks the Black Egyptian hypothesis. More specifically, it mocks the idea held by some people of Sub-Saharan African descent that their ancestors were Pharaohs of the Egyptian civilization. The use of mock-vernacular is meant to contrast supposedly "uneducated" African-Americans with supposedly "civilized" Ancient Egyptians.
"White Lives Matter"	"WLM"	A phrase meant to combat and oppose the Black Lives Matter movement.
"You Will Not Replace Us"	"Jews Will Not Replace Us", "YWNRU"	A reference to the popular white supremacist belief that white people are in danger of extinction due to increasing birth rates among non-white people and decreasing birth rates among white people.

== Hate group logos ==
Group	Image	Status	Notes
Advanced White Society		Inactive; Legacy	
American Front		Active	
Identity Evropa		Inactive; Rebranded as the American Identity Movement	
Aryan Brotherhood		Current	
Atomwaffen Division		Inactive	
Bound for Glory		Active	
Daily Stormer Book Club		Current	
European Kindred		Active	
Ku Klux Klan		Active	
Mississippi Aryan Brotherhood		Active	
National Socialist Movement (United States)		Current	
New Black Panther Party			
Patriot Front		Current	Patriot Front is an American white supremacist, neo-fascist, and American nationalist hate group. Part of the broader alt-right movement, the group split off from the neo-Nazi organization Vanguard America during the aftermath of the Unite the Right rally in 2017.
Skrewdriver		Inactive; Defunct	British white supremacist band, broke up in 1993, but still popular amongst the far-right, especially in Britain. They have been the subject of at least one parody group, "Jewdriver".
Stormfront (website)		Active	Stormfront is a neo-Nazi Internet forum, and the Web's first major racial hate site. The site is primarily focused on propagating white nationalism, antisemitism, Holocaust denial and white supremacy.
Brothers of White Warriors			Prison gang whose most common symbol is an Iron Cross containing the group's initials, jail bars, and a swastika
Aryan Cowboy Brotherhood		Active	

== Flags ==
Flag	Image	Notes
Confederate battle flag/ Confederate States Navy jack (1863–1865) (lighter blue field)		Although this was not the national flag of the Confederate States of America, it was later used by racist groups to attack Black people in the American South. This flag is also commonly-known as the "Rebel flag".
Flag of South Africa (1928–1994)		During the time when the flag was used, South Africa implemented the apartheid system, which ordered all Black citizens to use poor-quality facilities, making life more difficult and dangerous for Black and Coloured South Africans. It was used by racist groups to show their opposition to multiculturalism and hatred of non-White people.
Flag of Rhodesia		During the time when the flag was used, Rhodesia was ruled by a white minority government that denied political rights to the Black majority and enforced racial segregation. The flag has since been used by racist and white supremacist groups to promote opposition to racial equality and nostalgia for colonial rule and minority domination.
Vinland flag^{a}		The Vinland flag was appropriated by racist groups from English-speaking parts of Canada and America to represent their Norse origins. It is also used by non-racists, including fans of the flag's designer, Peter Steele, and his gothic metal band, Type O Negative.
Volksfront flag		
Imperial German Reichskriegflagge		This flag is used by modern Neo-Nazis, especially in Germany and the United States, to bypass the legal ban of the Nazi flag. Because of this usage, its use is considered as a crime within seven states in Germany. In the other nine German states, misuse of the flag for fascist purposes is punishable with a fine.
Nazi Party flag		As the flag of Nazi Germany, it has become notorious in the Western world as representative of the exterminations under the Holocaust, and Nazi hatred of other races and people considered "weak" or "inferior".
Northwest American Republic		It indicates a desire to create a state for only white people.

== Gestures ==
Gesture	Image
Nazi salute	
88 (hand sign)	
Aryan Brotherhood of Texas (hand sign)	
White Power sign (OK gesture)	

== Miscellaneous symbols ==
Symbol	Image	Explanation
Anti-Antifa imagery		Commonly used as memes or symbols by white supremacists to mock Antifa activists.
Anti-SHARP imagery		Used by racist skinheads to target and demean anti-racist skinheads (SHARPs)
Arrow Cross		Based on the symbol of the Arrow Cross Party, a Hungarian fascist political party which ruled Hungary from 1944 to 1945, under Ferenc Szálasi.
Celtic cross^{a}		
Crossed grenades		Based on the symbol of the 36th Waffen Grenadier Division of the SS, also commonly known as the Dirlewanger Brigade, headed by Oskar Dirlewanger, the namesake of the brigade.
Iron Cross (German military award of the Third Reich era)		
St. Michael's Cross		Based on the symbol of the Iron Guard, a Romanian fascist political party. The party ruled Romania alongside Marshal Ion Antonescu from 1940 until 1941 when the party caused a nationwide rebellion that was crushed by Antonescu's forces.
Odal (rune)		The Odal rune was used during Nazi Germany for two Waffen SS divisions. Likewise, racist neopagan groups also used the odal rune to represent a mythical "Aryan" past. It is also used by non-racist Norse neopagan groups in religious ceremonies.
Siegrunes		
Tyr Rune^{a}		
Jera Rune^{a}		
Swastika		
Valknut^{a}		
Wolfsangel		
Triple parentheses		Used by neo-Nazis online around a person or organization's name to signal that they are secretly Jewish.
Totenkopf		
Black Sun (Sonnenrad)		
Mjölnir^{a} (Thor's Hammer)		Racist neopagan groups use the Mjolnir to represent "Aryan" mysticism. However, the symbol is also used by non-racist and anti-racist Norse neopagan groups as a symbol for their religion or to worship Thor.
Nazi eagle		
Fasces		Initially used as the symbol of authority among Ancient Romans, it became the symbol of Benito Mussolini's National Fascist Party, which ruled the Kingdom of Italy from 1922 to 1943, and the Republican Fascist Party, that was the sole legal party in the Italian Social Republic, a puppet state of Nazi Germany. In contemporary use, it has been adopted as the fascist symbol due to its acceptance in the public compared to the Nazi Swastika.
Identitarian lambda		
Triangular Klan symbol		
Burning cross		
Noose		Nooses are used by racist groups in the United States to threaten Black people, representing lynching.
Crucified Skinhead symbol		Used to convey a sense of societal alienation or persecution against the skinhead subculture. According to the Anti-Defamation League, it is used by both racist skinheads as well as anti-racist skinheads, and it can be considered a hate symbol in certain contexts.
Pepe the Frog		Cartoon frog character first created in 2005, which has been co-opted as a racist meme since the late 2010s. In practice, it is normally used in a non-racist way.
Moon Man		Racist parody of McDonald's Mac Tonight mascot, which was used in a Doom mod where said character shoots Jews, Muslims, Black people, and other groups.
Bowl cut / Dylann Roof		The bowl cut is associated with Dylann Roof, who launched a mass murder attack at the Emanuel AME Church, Charleston, South Carolina, in 2015.
Ku Klux Klan robes		
Pit bull		Used as a skinhead symbol, possibly due to their use as fighting dogs.
German Soldier		White supremacists often wear tattoos featuring World War-II era German Soldiers.
No Race Mixing sign		Typically portrayed as a multiracial couple with a red circle/bar superimposed over the depiction.
Not Equal/Unequal/Not Equal To		Mathematical sign "≠" was adopted to imply racial differences, especially white supremacists.
The Happy Merchant (Alternate names: Jew Face/Le Happy Merchant/Merchant face)		See: A. Wyatt Mann
Trollface (Racist versions)		
Boots and Laces		Steel-toed work boots are a popular symbol among subcultures related to music. White power skinheads, may specifically wear them with red or white laces, usually "ladder laced" (uncrossed), but regular lacing also can be seen. It is important to keep in mind that various subcultures, such as punks and metalheads, wear boots that can be laced in "ladder lacing" way, in various colors.

== See also ==
- Armanen runes
- Cross burning
- Far-right subcultures
- Fascist symbolism
- List of fascist movements
- List of Ku Klux Klan organizations
- List of neo-Nazi organizations
- List of organizations designated by the Southern Poverty Law Center as hate groups
- List of white nationalist organizations
- Nazi symbolism
- The modern Federal Republic of Germany's Strafgesetzbuch section 86a
