= Prison gang =

Gang operating within a prison system

A prison gang is an inmate organization that operates within a prison system. It has a corporate entity and exists into perpetuity. Its membership is restrictive, mutually exclusive, and often requires a lifetime commitment. Prison officials and others in law enforcement use the euphemism "security threat group" (or "STG"). The purpose of this name is to remove any recognition or publicity that the term "gang" would connote when referring to people who have an interest in undermining the system.

== Origins ==
=== Convict code and informal governance of prisons ===
Before the rise of large, formal prison gangs, political scientists and researchers found that inmates had already organized around an understood "code" or set of norms. For example, political scientist Gresham Sykes in The Society of Captives, a study based on the New Jersey State Prison, claims that "conformity to, or deviation from, the inmate code is the major basis for classifying and describing the social relations of prisoners". Prisoners achieved a social equilibrium around unwritten rules. The code may include an understanding of prison slang, or prison yard and dining hall territory based on gang membership, rank, race, ethnicity, religion, or crimes committed, or it could simply be loyalty between inmates and against guards. Sykes writes that an inmate may "bind himself to his fellow captives with ties of mutual aid, loyalty, affection, and respect, firmly standing in opposition to the officials." Hostility between wardens and prisoners, restrained freedom, and, some argue, the lack of access to heterosexual relationships shaped prison culture's social, environmental and political dynamics.

=== Rising prison populations and the emergence of formal gangs ===
When researchers or political scientists actively discuss "classic prison gangs", they are referring to prison gangs in the United States of America; such gangs began to form in the mid 1960s. Around this time, across the United States prison system, the prison population increased markedly.

As prison populations grew, the informal convict code no longer sufficed to coordinate and protect inmates. The constant surge of prisoners coming into the system with no understanding of the status quo had disrupted the established equilibrium cohesion. And as demographics inside prisons changed drastically, small groups centered on ethnicity, race, and pre-prison alliances were disrupted. John Irwin states in his book, Prisons in Turmoil, that by 1970 "there [was] no longer a single, overarching convict culture".

Furthermore, as the prison population grew so did the consumer base for contraband items, not only drugs and weapons but also items that are legal outside of prison but are illegal to trade within prisons, such as money, alcohol, tattoos, etc. Several challenges arose that destabilized the socio-political system of self-enforced cooperation that had existed under the convict code. These new conditions posed complications to consumer-supplier relationships in the already distrustful environment of an underground economy. It became more and more difficult for independent individual suppliers to accommodate this increased demand. Under tight prison security and with limited means, these individual suppliers could only provide a limited amount of product. Their consumer base was too small for them to establish a "brand" or credibility themselves. New consumers would have to buy products of unknown quality and bear the risk of the supplier being an undercover informant and even the possibility that he would not deliver at all.

The ever-fluctuating inmate population also provided a dangerous market in which to operate. Individual suppliers had to protect themselves from possible murder and assault by consumers and other suppliers, as well as to ensure that their products would not be confiscated or stolen. They were vulnerable to those who delivered and carried the contraband into the prison, and they bore the risk of consumers not paying for the product, or (if operating on credit) not paying the loan. The consumers could also be informants.

In legal markets, governments mitigate such risks by means of contract enforcement and the upholding of property rights. Gangs may step into this role and fill the power vacuum. They vet and manage tax-paying supplier gangs within prisons, regulate transactions, and control violence in the marketplace and on the streets.

Prison gangs are effective in governing markets. They provide protection to their member suppliers more effectively than individual suppliers could do for themselves. They carry the credible threat of exercising violence - and even murder in case of theft or snitching - to ensure timely payments. They protect their members against competing suppliers. The size of prison gangs and their scale of product supply also means that they have a broad scope of knowledge about their client base. They share information on informants or inmates who default on payments. This scope of supply also gains a reputation with consumers, who can then feel safe in being able to gauge the quality of product and credibility of suppliers.

A crucial difference between individual suppliers who operate under the convict code and prison gangs involves the time-frame in which they operate. Unlike individual suppliers who cycle in and out, prison gangs form long-term institutions, regardless of how often individual members enter or leave the system. There are always plenty of members to maintain the gang's functions – behind bars and on the streets. This means they have a solid incentive to provide a quality product to uphold a good reputation in the long run.

Prison gangs have evolved into complex organizations with hierarchies and vote-based ranks and intricate coalitions with exclusive and often permanent memberships.

=== Alternative factors and explanations ===
Another approach to understanding prison gang development is based on observations of inmates in the Texas prison system. It provides a five-stage progression from an inmate's entrance to the prison to the formation of a prison gang. First an inmate enters the prison, alone and thus fearful until he finds a sense of belonging in a "clique of inmates." They band together without formal rules, leaders, or membership requirements. It then evolves into a "predatory group," creating exclusive requirements for membership and positioning itself against wardens, even assaulting them. Then, by engaging in illegal activities, they choose leaders to manage them. In its final stage, the group emerges as a prison gang.

A gendered approach to prison gangs offers two arguments focusing on the idea of male domination and the inmate's adherence to a hyper-masculine ideal.

One argument claims that prison order is shaped by the inmates' desire or need for male domination, and the gang reconstructs this sense of power in prison. As inmates can no longer "subjugate women," they find other forms of domination, resorting to force and violence to control each other.

Another approach, discussed by Erving Goffman, maps out four steps of inmate adaptation. In the first step, the inmate undergoes a "situational withdrawal" or mental withdrawal from the institution. "The inmate withdraws apparent attention from everything except events immediately around his body." The second step is called "colonization" when the inmate tries to rationalize the institution as preferable to life on the outside. The third step, "conversion," is when "the inmate takes over the staff's view of himself and tries to act out the role of the perfect inmate." The fourth step, which prison gang members fit into, is called "the intransigent line," when the inmate refuses the authority of the institution and acts against it.

There are also two prominent sociological theories surrounding prison gangs and the order within prisons: deprivation theory and importation theory.

Deprivation theory argues that social order within prisons arises due to the pain of imprisonment; studies focusing on this theory examine the experiences of prisoners and the nature of their confinement.

Importation theory focuses instead on experiences prisoners had prior to incarceration. It explores the ways in which class, race, and drug culture outside the prison have shaped dynamics inside the prison.

Another approach to understanding prison gang development is offered in sociologist Brittany Friedman's Carceral Apartheid, which argues that what the state terms prison gangs originally emerged as prisoner organizations that were in fact social movements that consolidated cliques to protest state violence targeting certain racial groups, particularly during the height of the Civil Rights Movement; Friedman's work emphasizes how state agencies engage in criminalization, torture, and extralegal violence using white supremacists to create a governance regime of carceral apartheid that mirrors the outside world as a crucial environmental factor shaping the development of prisoner collective action.

== Operations and activities ==
The system of governance in prison gangs highlights the unusual mechanisms by which people (or groups of people) with no access to government institutions manage to facilitate exchange and establish property rights within their scope of influence. The emergence of informal governance systems within prison gangs runs parallel to successful systems of trade and control beyond bars. Skarbek (2011) uses the example of the illegal narcotics trade in Los Angeles to explain how an alternative system of governance behind bars can lead to successful socioeconomic organization. Focusing on the Mexican Mafia prison gang, Skarbek argues that the mafia holds substantial control within local jail systems which allows it to yield power over drug dealers on the streets. Drug dealers outside the prison walls anticipate future incarceration and thus future interaction with the mafia. Faced with the threat of these future run-ins with the Mafia, drug dealers on the street comply with the current demands of prison gangs in order to secure their own future.

Since prison gangs gain a long-term profit if transactions in the illicit market run smoothly, they have the incentive to ensure that there is order and cohesion between suppliers and consumers.

Similar to stationary bandits that form governance out of anarchy in the model presented by economist Marcur Olson, prison gangs are actors who have the ability to extract resources from their population by providing services. They act to maximize their profit, not only by restraining the amount they extort, but by providing services that facilitate exchange and imposing "gang taxes". The Mexican Mafia, for example, increases its tax revenue by providing three types of services: protecting street gang members while they are incarcerated, protecting taxpaying drug dealers on the street, and settling of disputes.

In the process of maximizing profit, gangs may provide public goods to ensure smooth production, such as working to resolve gang disputes inside and outside of the prison.

Moreover, by holding the monopoly on violence in prisons, they pose a credible threat to street gangs, which they leverage to extort their profits. So prison gangs can extort street gangs because they pose a credible threat to inmates in the county jail, and street gang members rationally anticipate spending time there. They effectively use incarcerated street gang members as hostages to force non-incarcerated gang members to pay. Furthermore, they can encourage street gangs to steal from and make war with other non-taxpaying street gangs.

However, prison gangs cannot extort drug dealers whom they cannot harm in jail; for American prison gangs, this usually means members of other races (the county jails segregate them based upon race). They also cannot extort taxes from people who do not anticipate incarceration because there is no threat of facing violence in prison. And they cannot tax those outside the jurisdiction of a jail controlled by the gang. Non-incarcerated prison gang members collect taxes and regulate fraud and imposters acting as tax collectors. Taxpayers also ensure that their money is going to the right hands because consequences otherwise would be severe.

Political scientist David Skarbeck writes, "Like the stationary bandit, prison gangs provide governance institutions that allow illicit markets to flourish. They adjudicate disputes and protect property rights. They orchestrate violence so that it is relatively less disruptive. They do not do this because they are benevolent dictators but because they profit from doing so. In addition to governing prisons, gangs are also an important source of governance to the criminal world outside of prison. They wield tremendous power over street gangs, specifically those participating in the drug trade. Because of this power, governance from behind bars helps illicit markets to flourish on the streets."

The way that prison gangs consolidate and maintain power is also comparable to how actors behave in Charles Tilly's predatory theory of state-building model. Prison gangs engage in "war making," or monopolizing on force and occupying the power vacuum of state authority. They eliminate rivals (in the US mostly along racial lines) within their territories, and in doing so they carry out "state making." Gangs offer protection to their members, affiliates, and clients. They also extract or collect taxes from client gangs and those in the trade to maintain and expand their system.

One of the cities in South Africa – Cape Town – has its own history of gang activity dating back to the 19th century. One of the authors that wrote about African gangs recorded in one of his books that gang activity escalated with the establishment in an area known as the Cape Flats. Many young men turned to gangs for protection, opportunity, and a sense of belonging.

== Organization and structure ==
Prison gangs work to recruit members with street smarts and loyalty, and they look for inmates who will be able to carry out the gangs' functions and exercise force when necessary. They also create a structure to monitor activities of members and regulate the behavior of existing members within the gangs to ensure internal cohesion.

To ensure that high quality, dedicated members are being recruited, many prison gangs rely on existing members to vouch for or refer new members into the group. To enter gangs, members often have to prove their loyalty through costly activity, often violent hazing or committing some crime such as theft. Gang members mark themselves as part of the gang with tattoos (or colors, on the streets) so that taxpayers know they are credible collectors and so that gangs can keep track of their members as they move in and out of prison.

Prison gangs maintain a hierarchy and have written and unwritten rules of conduct. They have constitutions to define expectations and to guide laws for those they govern as well as to direct the process for the creation of new rules. In terms of the hierarchy, at the top of most US prison gangs is a group of "shot callers" who are like major stakeholders that make the major decisions about operations. Having a single dictator-like shot caller is unusual. Checks and balances within prison gang organizations are lucrative; internally, there are ways to voice dissatisfaction towards any level of the organization. For example, when conflicts arise or abuses occur where a higher-ranked gang member commits an offense against a lower-ranked member, an internal court-like body receives complaints and determines punishments. Actions are punished with violence. In many gangs exit is not an option (or is a very costly one); many prison gangs require a lifetime membership.

Political scientist Ben Lessing differentiates between prison gangs that arise within the prison system, which he calls 'natives,' and those that were already formed outside, calling them 'imports'. He claims that norms and culture-like initiation rituals, rules about sex, and relations with guards and non-members are shaped by the direction of formation. Natives have a 'prison character' in their imagery, traits, and codes that they retain even when native gangs engage in operations beyond the prison system. On the other hand, import gangs arrive with a "strong group identity, behavioral norms, and often their publicly known histories and reputations." This gives these groups a stronger sense of solidarity and cohesion in prison, though they compensate in how well they navigate the system within prison. Imports have an advantage in their existing outside operations.

Discussing the organizational mechanism within prisoner gangs, Skarbek (2011) argues that both explicit and implicit rules govern behaviors within these groups. Explicit rules are those that are formally written and structured, while implicit rules are those that are based on the values and norms of each group. Though the use of implicit and explicit rules (to what degree and to address which situations) may vary from group to group, Skarbek maintains that since codifying all rules is costly, prison gangs rely in great part on the existence of implicit rules, with values and norms forming a foundation from where informal governance begins. Other social scientists such as Ellickson (1991), echo similar claims but with key distinctions. Ellickson states that close-knit groups rely heavily on specific norms and informal rules to achieve cooperation and to minimize transaction costs within governance institutions based on property rights. However, while Ellickson's work focuses on non-hierarchical examples, Skarbek's example considers a hierarchical system of prison gangs. Nevertheless, Skarbek maintains that norms that govern small communities can also govern illegal markets such as those operated by prison gangs.

== List of American prison gangs ==
=== Hispanic prison gangs ===
- Mexican Mafia
  - Surenos
- Nuestra Familia
  - Nortenos
- Texas Syndicate
- Mexikanemi
- Ñetas
- Fresno Bulldogs
- Latin Kings
- Barrio Azteca
- Puro Tango Blast
- Trinitarios

=== White prison gangs ===
- Aryan Brotherhood
- Aryan Brotherhood of Texas
- Dirty White Boys
- European Kindred
- Confederate Knights of America
- Aryan Circle
- 11 Bus Killas
- Dead Man Incorporated
- Brotherhood of Aryan Alliance
- Simon City Royals
- Soldiers of Aryan Culture
- Universal Aryan Brotherhood
- Public Enemy No. 1

=== Black prison gangs ===
- Black Guerrilla Family
- United Blood Nation
- Folk Nation
- People Nation
- D.C. Blacks
- Vice Lords
- Gangster Disciples

== Prison gangs in other countries ==
=== South Africa ===
Prominent prison gangs in South Africa: 26s, 27s and 28s, collectively known as the Numbers, originate from a gang called The Ninevites, in the 19th- and early 20th-century. It was born in Johannesburg, and the leader of the Ninevites, "Nongoloza" Mathebula, is said to have created laws for the gang. "Nongoloza" became a supernatural figure and left behind an origin myth that shapes the current laws of the Numbers.

The gangs began to project outside the prison system starting in 1990, as globalization led to South Africa's illicit markets seeing the rise of large drug trafficking gangs. The Americans and the Firm, the two largest super gangs outside of prison, made alliances with Numbers gangs. They imported imagery, laws, and parts of the Numbers's initiation system. Membership in these gangs is not determined by race as it is with US prison gangs, however, initiation is still a costly and violent process, sometimes involving sexual hazing.

The 26s, 27s, 28s by means of robbery, murder, extortion, brigandage, of their own culture, their own religious beliefs create a tradition handed down from generation to generation, which continues to exist to this day. They are the historically illegal group of individuals who united in gangs with numeric values mentioned above. They are formed a tradition located in South Africa and called South African criminal tradition originated in Southern Africa 200 years ago according to the official history, and it differs from other traditions with the case that it came first in the wild and then in prison, because most of other criminal traditions originated inside the prison.

==== Differences with other gangs ====
- They have a special cult of Counter God which is called the Ninevites
- Special rules divided from the legend of Nongoloza Mathebula that set the rules of life of 26s, 27s and 28s
- They have a special cult of knife which they use as a form of punishment and execution. There are two kind of knives: the long and the short one. The short one is used for punishment and the long one is used for executions.
- They have a special combat system with a knife.
- They have a special language – sabela.
- They use a forced education of their adherents.
- There is a hopelessness of the situation that creates a special religion.

=== Brazil ===
The Primeiro Comando da Capital (or the PCC) is a Brazilian prison gang based in São Paulo. The gang rose in 1993 at a soccer game at Taubate Penitentiary to fight for prisoners' rights in the aftermath of the 1992 Carandiru Massacre, when São Paulo state military police killed more than 100 inmates.

The gang orchestrated rebellions in 29 São Paulo state prisons simultaneously in 2001, and since then it has caught the attention of the public for ensuing waves of violence. The Brazilian police and media estimate that at least 6,000 members pay monthly dues and are thus a base part of the organization. According to São Paulo Department of Investigation of Organized Crime, more than 140,000 prisoners are under their control in São Paulo.

The gang does not allow mugging, rape, extortion, or the use of the PCC to resolve personal conflicts. It maintains a strict hierarchy, led by Marcos Willians Herbas Camacho. All members inside and outside are required to pay taxes. Members can be soldiers, towers (gang leaders in particular prisons), or pilots (who specialize in communications). The PCC has strong ties with the Red Command, Rio's most powerful drug-trafficking organization which is rumored to supply them with cocaine.

=== Sweden ===
Brödraskapet (Swedish for the Brotherhood), shortend BSK, is a Swedish prison gang that was founded on 27 May 1995 by inmates inside the maximum security prison in Kumla, Sweden. The police in Sweden consider the Brotherhood to be a criminal organization in regard to the EU criteria for organized crime.

== Policy implications ==
Political scientist Benjamin Lessing predicts that crackdowns and harsher carceral sentences will increase prison gangs' control of outside actors, and that beyond a point, these policies limit state power. Lessing states, "the harsher, longer, and more likely a prison sentence, the more incentives outside affiliates have to stay on good terms with imprisoned leaders, and hence the greater the prison gangs' coercive power over those who anticipate prison."

Chart 6.1 from this article in the Small Arms Survey explores the effects of certain policy measures on the propagation of prison gangs through prison systems and their projection on streets.

== See also ==
- Prison gangs in the United States
- Identity politics
- Penitentiaries, Reformatories, and Chain Gangs by Mark Colvin
- The Rise of the Penitentiary: Prisons and Punishment in Early America by Adam J. Hirsch
