= Peckerwood (disambiguation) =

Peckerwood or Wood is a racial slur used to refer to White Americans.

Peckerwood may also refer to:

- Peckerwood Cemetery, the prisoners' cemetery at the United States Penitentiary Leavenworth, Kansas
- Peckerwood Hill, a nickname for Captain Joe Byrd Cemetery in Huntsville, Texas, operated by the Texas Department of Criminal Justice
- Peckerwood Creek, a tributary of the Coosa River in Alabama
- Peckerwood, the fictional plantation that is a setting in Mame (musical)
