= Soldiers of Aryan Culture =

White supremacist prison gang in the United States

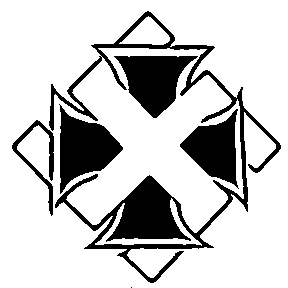
- S.A.C. emblem (patch logo)
- Founding location: Utah
- Years active: 1997–present
- Territory: Utah; Texas; Massachusetts; Pennsylvania; Montana; Virginia; Georgia
- Ethnicity: European American
- Criminal activities: Drug trafficking, assault, gun running, mail fraud, extortion, and murder
- Allies: Krieger Verwandt; Silent Aryan Warriors
- Rivals: Norteños; Big Circle Gang

The Soldiers of Aryan Culture (SAC), sometimes referred to erroneously as Soldiers of the Aryan Culture or Soldiers of an Aryan Culture, is a large white supremacist prison gang in the United States.

Initially based in its founding location of Utah, SAC has since branched out across the nation, now having members in several state correctional facilities along with the federal prison system.

== History ==
American prisoner Tracy David "Tinman" Swena founded the Soldiers of Aryan Culture in 1997. According to Tracy Swena's brother, Steve Swena, Tracy had been influenced to establish a white power group after an Aryan Brotherhood affiliate introduced him to white supremacist literature sometime in the mid-to-late 1990s. Prior to that, Steve Swena alleges that his brother was a non-racist who was once a part of a multi-racial street gang and even an avid fan of hip hop music.

The SAC has grown since its initial founding, making its way across the United States.

== Overview ==
=== Organizational structure ===
The Soldiers of Aryan Culture operate both inside and outside prison walls and are classified as a security threat group. SAC "officers" outside of prison stay in contact with those inside correctional facilities and communicate orders via phone.

The gang is organized by a paramilitary-esque ranking structure consisting of generals, captains, lieutenants, sergeants and soldiers. The more criminal activity that a member engages in, the more likely they'll advance to a higher rank. According to the Southern Poverty Law Center, SAC members rose through the ranks by committing violence against Hispanic and black inmates chosen at random.

SAC accepts new members by invitation only from a lieutenant or sergeant within the organization. These prospective members are required to complete a six-to-twelve-month period of missions. These orders typically call for attacks on other inmates. Once the mission is complete and the member is approved, they receive a SAC "patch" (tattoo) of the group's insignia: a swastika interwoven with an Iron Cross – sometimes accompanied by the initials "SAC". There also exist special patches for certain deeds, such as the SS bolts.

=== Ideology ===
Unlike most other white supremacist prison gangs such as the Aryan Brotherhood and the Nazi Lowriders, the SAC has a prominent antisemitic rhetoric within its values. For the Soldiers of Aryan Culture, hatred towards Jews is rather common.

The SAC code of conduct requires its members to attack known sex offenders and informants. Additionally, members are forbidden from cooperating with law enforcement and engaging in miscegenation, unless the gang leadership approves of it.

=== Criminal activities ===
The SAC engage in a number of different illicit actions, most notably drug production, extortion and violence. Throughout the group's history, there have also been instances of death threats, arms trafficking, courthouse violence and other crimes, including orchestrated assaults on prison guards.

== Notable crimes ==
=== 2002 Winter Olympics bomb plot ===
SAC first gained significant notoriety in 2002 when members of the group, along with members of the Silent Aryan Warriors (another white supremacist prison gang), allegedly planned to attack Jewish athletes at the 2002 Winter Olympics held in Salt Lake City by using pipe bombs.

=== Scott Biswell standoff ===
On August 11, 2002, Scott Biswell, a leader of the SAC, engaged in an armed confrontation with law enforcement members that resulted in his death.

An arrest warrant had been issued for Biswell following an incident in West Valley City, Utah, where he reportedly threatened two women and an infant child with a firearm over a traffic dispute. Biswell, who was out on parole, fled with his girlfriend Kortni Grimm – also wanted for child endangerment in a separate incident – to the Amenity Inn motel in Provo, Utah.

Executing the warrant, five members of the Provo police SWAT approached his motel room and forcibly entered the premises. Upon entry, Biswell was seen in bed with Grimm aiming a handgun at the SWAT unit. Biswell was gunned down instantly, and Grimm – believed to be unarmed – was wounded, later dying after being taken to the hospital.

=== RICO indictment ===
Twelve SAC leaders were indicted in 2003 following a law enforcement investigation. The indictment resulted in as long as 20-year sentences in federal prison. Additional lower-ranking members were tried and received prison sentences ranging from three to 15 and 1/2 years.

=== Murder of Gabriel Rhone ===
While being escorted by prison guards at USP Beaumont in 2007, SAC members Mark Isaac "Snuff" Snarr and Edgar Balthazar Garcia were able to free themselves from their restraints and subsequently stabbed the prison guards escorting them with makeshift knives. Using the keys they took off the guards, the two then unlocked the cell door of inmate Gabriel Rhone and proceeded to stab him a total of 50 times. In the process, Snarr and Garcia were quickly detained by prison personnel wielding chemical agents. While the two guards survived the attack, Rhone did not.

Investigators believed that Rhone was murdered because of his apparent escalating bizarre and violent behavior. Attorneys for Snarr and Garcia claimed that he had repeatedly threatened to kill their clients. Rhone had been serving a life sentence for a 1997 armed robbery in Washington, D.C.

Snarr and Garcia were indicted in 2009 and charged with first-degree murder. In 2010, both assailants were sentenced to death as punishment for the incident. As of 2020, they are both on death row at USP Terre Haute, awaiting execution.

=== Murder of Leo Johns ===
On March 3, 2016, SAC members Christopher Cramer and Ricky Fackrell fatally stabbed inmate Leo Johns at USP Beaumont. Johns, who was also a member of the SAC, had allegedly made a remark that had offended a fellow member of the gang, which is thought to be why the attack took place. According to court documents, the killing had been planned for a total 3 months in advance.

Cramer and Fackrell were convicted of first-degree murder and subsequently sentenced to death by a federal jury in Beaumont. Both are currently awaiting execution at USP Terre Haute.

=== Distribution of drugs and firearms ===
In October 2020, 21 members of the SAC, Silent Aryan Warriors, and Noble Elect Thugs were charged in Utah with distribution of drugs – including heroin and 1.65 pounds (0.75 kg) of methamphetamine – and firearms following a joint local-federal investigation that began in June 2019.

== Known members and associates ==
- Lee Ervin "Dallas" Heyen – Drug dealer who was later convicted for the rape of two teenage girls.
- Jason Robert Widdison – Currently serving a sentence of 31 years and eight months in federal prison for the murder of Kenneth Mills, a white inmate who did not object to having an African American cellmate at the USP Atlanta.
- Donald R. Lafond - Co-defendant in the Widdison USP Atlanta murder.
- Kevin "M&M" Mclaughlin
- Kurt "OD" Onken
- Lance "Lil' Lance" Vanderstappen – Attacked a Hispanic inmate in 2001. The victim, who Vanderstappen stabbed with a shank he smuggled into a federal courthouse, suffered non-life-threatening wounds. Committed suicide in 2006 while serving his sentence at ADX Florence.
- Joe Rakes - Accused of sending a threatening letter to a federal prosecutor who was trying to dismantle the gang.
- John Arthur "Cajun" McGee
- David "Castle" Fink
- Michael Sean Polk - A co-conspirator of a carjacking robbery that resulted in an armed confrontation.
- Jason "Kid" Bates - Convicted of blinding a fellow Weber County jail inmate in one eye in 2001.
- Eric Judkins - Heavily tattooed bank robber and prison escapee who seriously assaulted an inmate while serving time in federal prison. It is unknown if this assault was gang-related.
- Andrew "Nutz" Beck
- Jeff "Sherwood" Schirado
- Robert Austin
- Dennis Judd

== See also ==
- Prison gangs in the United States
- Universal Aryan Brotherhood – Another white supremacist prison gang in the United States.
- 211 Crew – An American white supremacist prison gang with a notorious reputation for violence.
- Aryan Nations – An antisemitic white supremacist hate group, initially based in Idaho.
- ADX Florence – A supermax prison facility reserved for the most notorious American criminals. Tracy Swena was briefly held here for some time as was Lance Vanderstappen, who committed suicide at the facility in 2006.
