= Tom Clements (public official) =

Assassinated head of Colorado Department of Corrections

Executive Director of the Colorado Department of Corrections
- In office January 2011 – March 19, 2013

Personal details
- Born: Thomas Lynn Clements; October 2, 1954 St. Louis, Missouri, U.S.
- Died: March 19, 2013 (aged 58) Monument, Colorado, U.S.
- Cause of death: Assassination
- Party: Democrat
- Spouse: Lisa Smith (m. 1984)
- Children: 2

Thomas Lynn Clements (October 2, 1954 – March 19, 2013) was head of the Colorado Department of Corrections from January 2011 until his assassination on March 19, 2013.

== Early life ==
Clements was born in St. Louis, Missouri. He married Lisa Smith in 1984 and had two daughters. Before moving to Colorado to lead the Colorado Department of Corrections (DOC), Clements had worked in a similar position in Missouri.

Clements was known as a progressive leader who cared about the mental health of his prisoners and worked to ensure their transition into society once released. "Tom Clements was someone who worked in a cold, dark world with a remarkably open and generous heart," said Colorado Governor John Hickenlooper the day after Clements was killed.

== Assassination ==
On March 19, 2013, Clements was shot in the chest at his home in Monument, Colorado after answering the door. He was pronounced dead at the scene. His assassination drew international attention, as it came hours before Governor John Hickenlooper signed new gun control laws.

=== Suspects ===
The substantial evidence in the case indicates that the assassin was Evan Spencer Ebel (August 16, 1984 – March 21, 2013), a 28-year-old white supremacist and follower of Asatru. Ebel was killed during a high-speed chase with Texas law enforcement two days after Clements' death. Ebel had driven to Wise County, Texas. A Texas sheriff's deputy realized that the car Ebel was driving matched the car suspected in the Clements killing in Colorado—an older black Cadillac sedan, with mismatched license plates. That Texas deputy was Montague County Sheriff's Deputy James Boyd, who first pulled over Ebel's vehicle and was shot in the head by Ebel but survived. The shooting was captured on the deputy's cruiser's video. After a wild chase with engaging gunfire with law enforcement, he collided with a semi-truck carrying a large payload of gravel, to which he got out and continued firing at officers. Ebel was then shot and critically wounded by them and died from his injuries without regaining consciousness.

Police also found items that they concluded were stolen from another murdered Colorado man, Nathan Leon: a pizza delivery shirt and an insulated pizza delivery container. Leon was forced to make a rambling recorded audio statement before he was murdered. Police believe that Ebel killed Leon on March 17 to get the pizza delivery "props" that Ebel subsequently used to feign a pizza delivery to the Clements home. The gun found in the stolen Cadillac matched the ballistics of the gun used in the killings of Clements and Leon.

Since Ebel could not legally purchase a pistol due to being a convicted felon, he had his friend, Stevie Vigil, a straw buyer, purchase the murder weapon. She was sentenced to more than two years in prison for supplying the murder weapon.

Ironically, Evan Ebel's father, Jack Ebel, is an old friend of Colorado governor John Hickenlooper, the man who hired Tom Clements. When Governor Hickenlooper originally interviewed Tom Clements for his position the governor claims to have had a conversation about the son of a friend in administrative segregation, but that he never mentioned Ebel by name.

=== Motives ===
Evan Ebel had spent much of his time in prison in solitary confinement. Tom Clements' successor, Rick Raemisch, has said "Whatever solitary confinement did to that former inmate and murderer, it was not for the better."

Suspicion has also fallen on members of the 211 Crew, a white supremacist gang formed in Colorado's prisons in the mid-1990s. The only formal suspect authorities have named in his death, Ebel, is thought to have had connections with the 211 Crew. On April 5, 2013, it was confirmed by the El Paso County Sheriff's Office that James Lohr, 47, had been arrested by the Colorado Springs Police Department, and that Thomas Guoly, aka Thomas Guolee, 31, was also wanted for questioning.

== Memorial service ==
A public memorial service was held for Clements at New Life Church in Colorado Springs, CO, on March 25, 2013. Mourners at the memorial service included Colorado Gov. John Hickenlooper, state leaders, family members, friends, and former inmates. Hickenlooper called Clements a great man who led a "quiet crusade" to reform the state's correctional system.

"It was a belief he had at the core of his person, that anyone could be redeemed," Hickenlooper told mourners. "He was, without question, one of the most remarkable people I've ever known in my life." Clements worked in corrections in Missouri for three decades before he accepted an offer from Hickenlooper—in 2010—to head Colorado's prisons.
