= Puro Tango Blast =

Group of street and prison gangs in Texas

- Founded: late 1980s
- Founding location: TDCJ, Texas, U.S.
- Years active: 1980's–present
- Ethnicity: Predominantly Hispanic with some White members.
- Membership: 17,000–19,000
- Activities: Prostitution, Robberies, Drug trafficking, Agg. Assault, Flight to Avoid Prosecution, Unlawful Uses of Motor Vehicles, Unlawful Poss of Firearms.
- Rivals: Mexikanemi; Texas Syndicate; Barrio Azteca; Crips

Puro Tango Blast (PTB), or Tango Blast, is a term used to collectively describe various regionally based American street and prison gangs of primarily Hispanic men from major Texas cities.

== History ==
Incarcerated Hispanic men from major Texas cities (including Houston, Dallas, Fort Worth, Austin), have banded together for protection from established security threat groups like Mexikanemi and the Texas Syndicate. Each regional group is individually called a Tango. These Tangos began forming in the 1980s and may have roots back as far as the 1970s.

The term Tango Blast, in actuality, does not refer to a separate group. Rather, it refers to the idea that a particular Tango member is more criminally active than others. Some Tango members say that Tango is an acronym for "Together Against Negative Gang Organizations". However, Tango originally meant something like 'hometown clique.'

== Structure ==
Although often referred to as a prison gang, Tango Blast is different than traditional prison gangs such as Mexikanemi and the Texas Syndicate, lacking the typically strict hierarchy of those organizations. The Texas Department of Public Safety classifies Tango Blast as a "loose affiliation" gang, with "relaxed membership requirements and little to no detectable leadership hierarchy." The El Paso County sheriff's officials have noted that "there is no known formal organization of the gang on El Paso streets." While those more structured organizations, known as Security Threat Groups, will have a variety of structures, Tango members in a particular area of a correctional facility will elect a silla (Spanish for "chair"), to speak for that area of the facility and will not have a constitution that governs how the members must behave.

Tango Blast members do not have to follow orders, attend organizational meetings or pay other Tango members to be active. They also do not have to participate in any gang activities when they are out of prison. There is no consistent pathway for initiation into a Tango. Rather, each individual set of Tango members determines who it admits and by what methods.

One initiation method is called a "Cora Check" or a test of heart in which the potential member must engage in physical combat with 2 or more members. Provided that he does not surrender during the melee he is inducted to the gang. However, membership can usually only be acquired in prison and not in jails or on the streets.

== Individual Tangos ==
While it is commonly believed that there are only four chapters to the gang, other regions of the state have their own Tangos. Collectively, the tangos from Austin, Dallas, Fort Worth, and Houston are known as the 4 Horsemen. Individual Tango members use regionally appropriate symbols as tattoos to identify the tango to which they belong. Generally, Tango members identify themselves by sport team logos or area codes from their hometown or region.

Houstone or H-Town members, who are from Houston, often use the Houston Texans logo, Houston Astros & Cracked Houston Texan Symbol star. D-Town members, who are from Dallas, may use the Dallas Cowboys star, Foritos or F-Town members, who are also known as Foros and are from Fort Worth, often use the 817 area code, a star with 817 in the center similar to a pentagram. ATX or A-Town or La Capirucha (meaning The Capital) members, who are from Austin, may use the Texas Capitol building. These four Tangos represent the earliest Tangos to form.

Other areas of Texas have their own Tangos, notably West Texas (Puro West or Wesos, often displaying 806 or 432, or a WT in tattoos), the Rio Grande Valley (Vallucos), San Antonio (Orejones), Corpus Christi (Corpitos) and El Paso (Chucos or EPT).

== Media ==
History, in their series Gangland, dedicated an episode to a description of Puro Tango Blast in episode 12 of season 5.
