= The Rise of the Penitentiary in New York =

1965 book by W. David Lewis

From Newgate to Dannemora: The Rise of the Penitentiary in New York, 1796–1848
- 2009 Book jacket
- Author: W. David Lewis
- Subject: Prisons New York (State) History
- Genre: Sociohistorical nonfiction
- Set in: State of New York
- Published: 1965, 2009
- Publisher: Cornell University Press
- Publication place: United States
- Media type: Print, E-book, Audio
- Pages: 336
- ISBN: 9780801475481
- OCLC: 320447026
- Website: Official website

From Newgate to Dannemora: The Rise of the Penitentiary in New York, 1796–1848 is a book-length history chronicling the origins and early expansion of the penitentiary in New York state during the antebellum period. It was written by W. David Lewis and published in 1965 and reissued in 2009 by Cornell University Press.

== Synopsis ==
During the 50 years following 1796, New York built four prisons - Newgate, Auburn, Sing Sing, and Dannemora. These institutions reflected the realities of the state at the time: brutality, a lack of knowledge, unconcern for inmates, carelessness, misuse of religion, political infighting, apathy and selfishness. Hence, the book argues that efforts to reform prisons in pre-Civil War New York were usually overseen by those who weren't sympathetic towards inmates. According to the book, it seems that the more successful a reformer, the less compassionate they tended to be. Two failed attempts at prison reform came to the author's attention. The first involved Thomas Eddy, who founded Newgate prison in 1796. The second was a group in the 1840s who were intent on fighting the terrible conditions that had developed since Eddy's time. Eddy's methods were derived from the Enlightenment. The second group subscribed to Romanticism.

=== Changes in thinking ===
During the late 18th century a shift occurred in the prevailing views about the treatment of offenders. This era was heavily influenced by democratic revolutions in America and France. This resulted in significant changes to penal systems because of a wide spread movement to reduce or abolish corporal and capital punishment in many countries. Imprisonment became a popular alternative form of punishment. In the United States, Philadelphia is considered to be a pioneer of this movement. The Walnut Street Prison, established in the 1790s, became the first state penitentiary in Pennsylvania. This institution attracted widespread attention, both domestically and internationally, and was seen as a model for its time. And this model influenced Thomas Eddy and Philip Schuyler, who visited the prison in 1796, to advocate for building a state penitentiary in New York.

=== Actual prison life ===
Mr. Lewis's research provides a detailed account of the prison administration's focus on utilizing inmate labor during this period. This focus aimed to achieve financial self-sufficiency and potentially generate profits for the state. The primary means of achieving this goal involved demanding long work hours, from early morning to dusk, in various locations such as Auburn's workshops, Sing Sing's quarries, and the iron ore mines of Clinton prison. Corporal punishment, in the form of flogging, was used to enforce compliance with these labor demands, and was legal from 1817 to about 1847.

== About the book ==
Much of this scholarly work was originally written as the author's Cornell University Ph. D thesis. Relevant information is derived from "legislative reports, letters, and diaries of officials," as well as diaries of others involved with New York's prisons during that period. Secondary sources are "county histories, biographies", and academic journal articles. The book is deemed to be comprehensive and written from an objective perspective. It consists of twelve chapters and 336 pages.

== See also ==
- Discipline and Punish by Michel Foucault
- The Rise of the Penitentiary by Adam J. Hirsch
- Penitentiaries, Reformatories, and Chain Gangs by Mark Colvin
- The History of United States prison systems
