= Vinland flag =

Nordic cross flag

Vinland
- Proportion: 8:11
- Designed by: Type O Negative

The Vinland flag is a Nordic cross flag designed by American gothic metal band Type O Negative.

== History ==
The flag was used to symbolize a variety of frontman Peter Steele's interests and ideals, including his Icelandic heritage. Viking explorers visiting North America around the year 1000 called one of the areas they came to "Vinland". The flag appears on various Compact Disc covers produced by the group, sometimes with the slogan "made in the People's Technocratic Republic of Vinland", and adorns various pieces of Type O Negative merchandise. The flag resembles the unofficial flag of the Forest Finns adopted in 1978.

The first physical Vinland flags went up for sale in 2004.

=== Use by white supremacists ===
In the early 2000s, white supremacist skinhead group Vinlanders Social Club widely appropriated the flag. Various far-right groups have subsequently adopted it as an ethnic flag, commodiously identifying the name of the 11th-century Norse colony at L'Anse aux Meadows, Newfoundland, called Vinland in the Norse sagas, with the predominantly Anglo-American inhabited areas of the modern nations of Canada and the United States.

In response, the Anti-Defamation League designated the flag as a potential hate symbol, while making distinctions for the use of the flag by non-racists and supporters of Peter Steele and the band Type O Negative.

== See also ==
- List of symbols designated by the Anti-Defamation League as hate symbols
