= Brödraskapet =

Swedish prison gang

Brödraskapet (The Brotherhood)
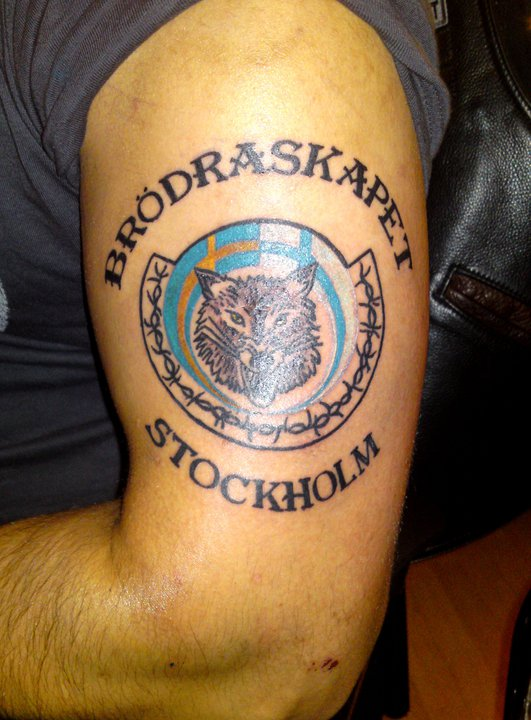
- BSK Stockholm tattoo
- Founded: 27 May 1995
- Founded by: Daniel Mark Michael Fitzpatrick
- Founding location: Kumla Prison, Sweden
- Years active: 1995–present
- Territory: A number of cities nation-wide
- Ethnicity: Swedish, Finnish
- Membership (est.): 60–70
- Criminal activities: Drug trafficking, arms trafficking, robbery, murder and extortion
- Rivals: Hells Angels

Brödraskapet (Swedish for the Brotherhood), shortend BSK, is a Swedish prison gang that was founded on 27 May 1995 by inmates inside the maximum security prison in Kumla, Sweden. The police in Sweden consider the Brotherhood to be a criminal organization in regard to the EU criteria for organized crime.

== Background ==
In 1993, stricter rules were implemented in the Swedish prison system. Among the changes, the possibility for early parole was abolished. In accordance with a tougher view on crime in Swedish society, more persons received prison sentences and the sentences also got longer. This increased the pressure on the prison system and created a tougher environment in Swedish prisons, especially inside the larger security prisons like Kumla, Hall and Tidaholm.

== The founding of the Brotherhood ==
Some of the worst inmates tried to fight the new system which led to an increased number of confrontations between prison guards and inmates. A serious riot occurred in the summer of 1994 at Tidaholm prison and parts of the prison were burnt to the ground. Some of the leaders of the riot at Tidaholm prison would later become founding members of the Brotherhood. The response of the prison authorities to the inmates' actions was extensive use of solitary confinement, forced relocation to other security prisons and delayed paroles. Around New Year's 1994/95, a group of hardcore inmates began to organize themselves inside Kumla security prison, and in the spring of 1995 they founded the Brotherhood ("BSK" for short), the first prison gang in Sweden.

== Danny Fitzpatrick ==
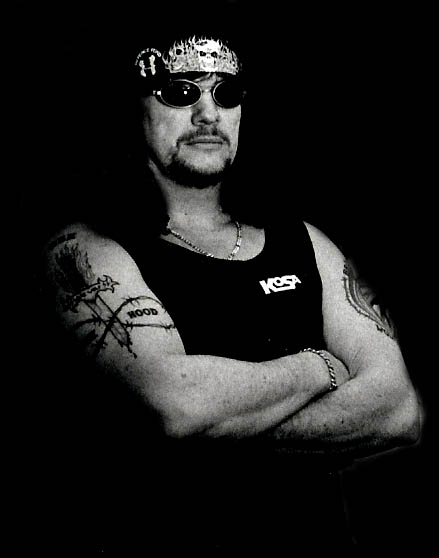
Daniel Fitzpatrick

The initiator and leader of the organization was Daniel "Danny the Hood" Fitzpatrick (born 26 February 1953, assassinated 18 June 1998). He was serving an eight-year sentence for an armed robbery committed in Stockholm in 1992. He was also suspected of murdering a police officer in connection to another armed robbery in Högdalen the same year. The Brotherhood recruited some of the worst and most infamous criminals in Sweden. Their members were serving sentences for armed robbery, drugs, murder, attempted murder of police officers, etc. Among other things the rules of the Brotherhood demanded that the members had to serve time in a security prison and refuse to participate in any rehabilitation programs or give urine samples for drug testing. They also had to show court documents to prove that they were not informers. The prison authorities sent the Brotherhood members to solitary confinement and relocated members to other prisons in an effort to break up the organization. But these actions backfired and instead the organization spread to several other prisons. During 1996–1997 the Brotherhood is estimated to have consisted of 80–90 inmates and they had a strong influence over other inmates as well as the prison staff. According to police and prison authority records, Brotherhood members were highly active in criminal activity inside the prisons, mainly in drug dealing and violent crimes. A number of murders inside the Kumla and Tidaholm security prisons during the 1990s are believed to have been committed by the Brotherhood. A Brotherhood member is still serving a life sentence for murdering another inmate at the Tidaholm prison in 1998. According to the police investigation, the inmate was murdered for slandering the president of the Brotherhood.

== The Brotherhood MC and the Brotherhood Wolfpack ==
At the end of the year 1995 the outlaw motorcycle club (omc) Asa MC in Stockholm joined up with Brotherhood members that had been released from prison and founded the first Brotherhood chapter outside of the prison walls. The chapter adopted the same organizational structure as a 1% MC and was located in Länna in the south of Stockholm. The Brotherhood MC chapter (BSK MC) consisted of about 15-20 members and maintained a high profile in the underworld of Stockholm during the years 1995-1998. BSK MC also recruited people that had not served time in prison. Therefore, Brotherhood members inside the security prisons started to use the addition "Wolfpack" to emphasize a status difference. During the period 1996-1998 several Brotherhood members in Stockholm were arrested and convicted for various crimes such as extortion, illegal possession of firearms and abduction. Danny Fitzpatrick was released from the Hall prison in January 1998. During his celebration party a defector from the club was shot in the leg and another man received an axe blow to the head.

== The Death of the President ==
Danny Fitzpatrick was shot dead in his car on 18 June 1998 in the Råcksta roundabout of western Stockholm. The reason for this has never been fully investigated. Three members of the Hog Riders Motorcycle Club, a support club for the Hells Angels, were later charged with involvement in the murder. One was sentenced to eight years in prison, and another to three years in prison for aiding and abetting. A third member, who allegedly acted as a decoy to lure Fitzpatrick to the scene of his murder, was acquitted.

Shortly after Fitzpatrick's murder, the Brotherhood MC chapter was dissolved. But inside the prisons the gang's activities continued unaffected. A new President was elected and during the fall of 1998 new chapters were established on the outside (in Göteborg and Västerås), but this time without the MC agenda. The new President had in the past been associated with the Skinhead movement. He recruited a few former skinheads to the gang's hangaround chapter in Västerås. There's however no political agenda in the organization. A number of the Brotherhood members have an immigrant background and the common denominator is the members’ criminal lifestyle. But the reign of the second president of the Brotherhood was short lived. He was jailed at the end of 1999 and left the gang in August 2000. His successor was another infamous criminal who had been a member of the gang since its founding in 1995. This man was the President of the Brotherhood during the period of 2000-2002 and then acted as president of the Göteborg chapter up until 2006. The Brotherhood recruited many well known criminals in the Göteborg area during the years 1999-2000 and established a strong presence on the Swedish west coast. In the spring of 2001 a conflict occurred within the gang. A recently paroled member of the Västerås chapter disappeared at the beginning of the summer and the police assume that he has been murdered. During a meeting in July 2001 the Vice President of the Göteborg chapter and two other members were excluded from the gang. The former vice president and one of the members disappeared at the end of August and was found dead and buried in a quarry in the spring of 2002. Ten hangarounds and prospects were also excluded from the Göteborg chapter in September 2001, probably for choosing "the wrong side" in the conflict.

== The Brotherhood expands ==
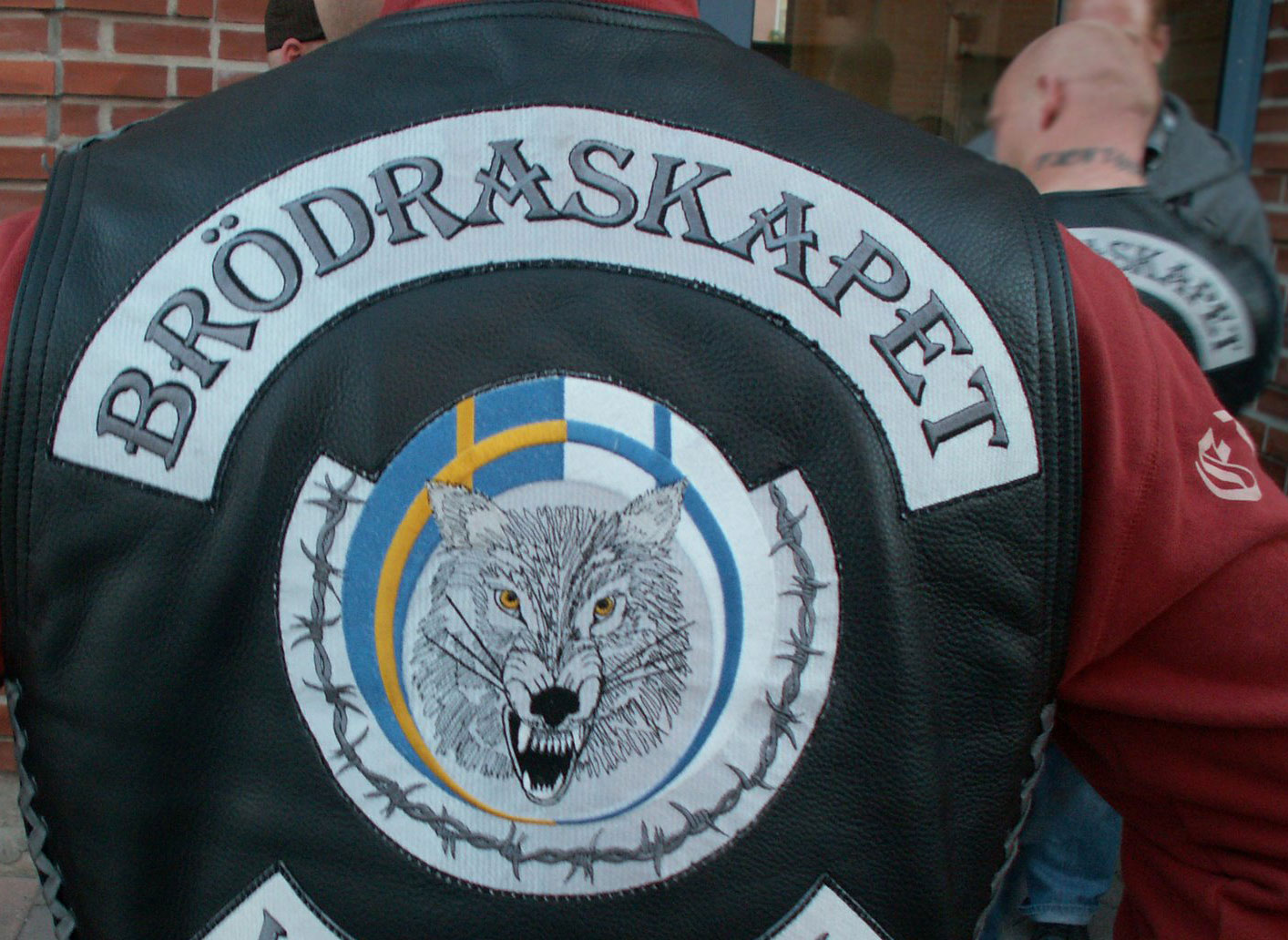
"Brödraskapet" emblem

In 2002, the Brotherhood expanded its organization outside the prison walls and founded new chapters in Helsingborg and Kristianstad. A support organization called “BSK Support” was also formed. Support crews were organized in the cities of Göteborg, Västerås, Helsingborg, Kristianstad, Uddevalla and Katrineholm. They also recruited members to the support organization inside the prisons. The Police estimate the gang's numbers to 60-70 members during 2002-2003. About two thirds of the gang's members were outside the prisons at this time, which was deemed very unusual. At the end of 2002 a National chapter was founded. This chapter was believed to have a national responsibility and be able to make decisions in overall questions. A Member from Västerås was elected National President. A member from Helsingborg became National Vice President and a member from Göteborg became Sgt. at arms. In 2003 the gang was highly active on the west coast and in the south of Sweden. Despite this, there were only a few members doing time during this year. But this was soon about to change. The Police in the Göteborg district came down hard on the gang and in 2004 some 20 members of the Brotherhood were jailed and convicted in a number of cases concerning illegal drugs, assault and battery, abduction etc. Only a handful of members from the Göteborg chapter remained on the outside in the fall of 2004. Despite police efforts the effect that this had on the gang's activities was less than expected.

The gang's criminal activities on the outside slowed down for a while but the recruitment of new members continued and escalated the following years due to the larger number of Brotherhood members inside the prisons. The Brotherhood is basically a prison gang and its members quickly adapt to new circumstances and reorganize the organization. In 2005, the Brotherhood was in a conflict with another criminal gang and many acts of violence were committed between the two groups, especially inside the prisons. During this period the Brotherhood strengthened its influence inside the prisons, while the activities on the outside slowed down due to the fact that many of the leading Brotherhood members were imprisoned. The police noted that despite the loss of many members on the outside the gang could still run its clubhouses in Göteborg and Uddevalla as usual.

== Internal conflicts ==
At the end of 2005 yet another internal conflict erupted within the organization and this resulted in the exclusion of the National Vice President and the dissolving of the Helsingborg chapter. In 2006 several Brotherhood members were released from prison and the gang's criminal activities increased once again on the west coast and in the south. A well known criminal lost an eye when he was assaulted and beat up by two members of the Brotherhood in Göteborg. A member of the BSK Support gang in Kristianstad got an ear cut off in what is believed to have been the settling of an internal dispute. Several members were convicted of a series of crimes such as extortion, assault and battery and robbery during the year. A Brotherhood member from Kristianstad was shot dead in a car in the city of Malmö. The investigation showed that it probably was an accidental shot and an acquaintance of the Brotherhood member was sentenced to a shorter prison term. According to a protocol from the annual meeting of the Brotherhood in September 2006 a decision was made to abolish the titles of President, Vice President etc. The structure of the gang's leadership today is unknown.

== Murder at the Clubhouse ==
2007 began with the murder of a former member of another criminal gang during a party at the Brotherhood clubhouse in Göteborg. The man is believed to have been murdered after making a negative remark about a Brotherhood member's tattoo. Several members and supporters were jailed for the crime. Eventually one member and one supporter were convicted for involvement in the murder. A number of the gang's members were released from prison during the summer and fall of 2007 and gang activity once again increased in the South and on the west coast.

== Stockholm is retaken ==
Nearly a decade after the dissolving of the Stockholm chapter a new chapter was established in the Swedish Capital. Several members were jailed and convicted of serious crimes during the summer and fall of 2007. Among other things the President of the Göteborg chapter was sentenced to a longer prison term for serious drug offences. The Brotherhood chapters outside the prison walls are located in the cities of Göteborg, Stockholm, Västerås, Kristianstad, Uddevalla and Malmö. A number of key members are serving long prison sentences and the gang is believed to have strengthened its position inside the Swedish prisons. The Swedish Police call the gang's activities "multi criminal" and deem the Brotherhood members as extremely violent. The prison authorities and the police are highly active in fighting the organization and in finding new ways to disrupt the gang's activities.

== In popular culture ==
The fictional character Mattias Nilsson, from the Mercenaries series of video games, is a member of the gang, and in the in-game universe is the reason behind its criminal history.

== See also ==
- Prison gang
