= Penitentiaries, Reformatories, and Chain Gangs =

1997 book by Mark Colvin

Penitentiaries, Reformatories, and Chain Gangs: Social Theory and the History of Punishment in Nineteenth-Century America
- 1997 cover jacket
- Author: Mark Colvin
- Subject: Penal theory and institutions, Punishment 1800 — 1899
- Published: 1997
- Publisher: St. Martin's Press
- Publication place: United States
- Media type: Print, e-book, audio
- Pages: 294
- ISBN: 9780312173272
- OCLC: 36528434

Penitentiaries, Reformatories, and Chain Gangs: Social Theory and the History of Punishment in Nineteenth-Century America is a non-fiction book written by Mark Colvin. It was published by St. Martin's Press in 1997. In this book, Colvin applies theoretical perspectives to changes in punishment that occurred in the United States penal system during the 19th century.

== Synopsis ==
Over the past 200 years, the United States has put into service various institutions to punish criminals. Examples include: prisons (penitentiaries), institutions for rehabilitation (reformatories), and a system where prisoners were leased to private companies (convict lease). Various social pressures influenced these methods of punishment such as economic needs, influential power politics, and the cultural beliefs of the time. Martha A. Myers, writing for The American Journal of Legal History says, "Multiple causal influences are always at work [because] human agency figures in each and every one of them."

Hence Colvin, the author, explores how punishment has changed in America from a historical and a social theory perspective. He does this by looking at three specific examples (case studies) from the 1800s that show how people viewed punishment during this period. The three specific cases are: penitentiary origins and expansion in the Northeastern United States; reevaluations in the Northern United States of how to treat women in custody, and the post-Civil War shifts in perspectives on punishment in the Southern United States.

The book also illuminates the history of and the current state of punishment, the American criminal justice system, and the rehabilitation of offenders. Additionally, the author explores the difference between punishing criminals and trying to rehabilitate them. He also looks at how women were treated in reform institutions and how convict leasing and chain gangs in the South continued the practices of slavery, especially for black prisoners.

=== Social and economic forces ===
Colvin frames his narrative from four theoretical perspectives to ask why we punish people the way we do. The answer lies within a complex web of social and economic factors. One view, from Émile Durkheim, emphasizes how punishment reflects a society's moral values, especially religious ideas. Another perspective, from Marxists, focuses on how punishment is tied to the market economy and to ideas about social class. Michel Foucault adds the role of the government and its control systems. Finally, Norbert Elias suggests that overall changes in "civilizing sensibilities" have influenced how punishments are carried out. These theories can be helpful tools for understanding how punishment systems in the US have changed over time. Colvin also discusses some of the limitations of each theory.

He additionally assesses important reformers like Benjamin Rush, Thomas Eddy, Eliza Farnham, and Zebulon Brockway. He shows how the goals and approaches of reformers generationally changed over time. For example, he analyzes how Josephine Shaw Lowell, born in the mid-19th century, bridged the gap between the earlier religious reformers and the later, more professionalized reformers.

=== Women offenders ===
This segment of the book explores how women were punished, particularly with the rise of reformatories. Colvin argues that reformatories weren't simply a response to an increase in female crime. Instead, their appearance is related to a larger shift toward principles embodied in capitalism. This shift changed women's opportunities and their social standing. Public confusion about women's roles and behavior appears to have caused the creation of these institutions by various social and charitable groups. These groups, with their specific moral views, ended up defining the characteristics of reformatories. The pervasive idea of what a good woman should be (Cult of True Womanhood) and the values of the middle class (bourgeois moral order) were connected. These ideas heavily influenced who got sent to reformatories and what kind of punishments they received.

=== Southern chain gangs ===
Henry Kamerling, who reviews this book for The Florida Historical Quarterly, says that recently, historians have been focusing more on the use of chain gangs and convict leasing in the Southern United States after the American Civil War. Kamerling also says that in contrast to some of these studies, Colvin has taken a different tack. Colvin says these prison systems were a way for white Southerners to control the black population who had just been freed from slavery. Colvin argues that conservative white Democrats were responsible for the far-reaching use of a harsh convict leasing system. Their forceful rise to power in the South during the 1870s ended the Reconstruction era, and gave impetus to the implementation of this system.

Also, according to Colvin, the economic growth in the South after the Civil War (the New South) was a major reason why convict leasing became widespread. At the same time, social theories about becoming more civilized and rational very much failed, because the South was less concerned with guiding principles that might lead to rehabilitation. Punishment then, had become something that wasn't really about reforming criminals within prison systems.

== Reception ==
Reviews of this work are mixed:

Myra C. Glenn, writing for The American Historical Review says: "Despite my criticisms of Colvin's book, it is one of the few texts that provides undergraduate students with a readable, concise history of punishment and penal institutions in the nineteenth-century United States. If used judiciously by teachers, it can challenge students to think critically about a crucial subject."

Michael Donnelly, writing for Social Forces says that Colvin's book might be easier to understand for students because he simplifies complex topics. He does a good job of bringing together different historical sources, but it would be even better if the book had pictures and charts to make it more engaging and easier to read.

Michael Meranze, writing for Law and History Review says: "[This book] emerged out of a pedagogical dilemma — the difficulty Colvin confronted in presenting the diverse array of historical and sociological studies on the history of punishment...in a coherent and manageable way. Colvin has brought together an impressive amount of historiographical and sociological material in a search for that coherence. His work clarifies issues that need to be confronted if a compelling historical sociology of punishment is to be written."

== See also ==
- Discipline and Punish by Michel Foucault
- The Rise of the Penitentiary by Adam J. Hirsch
- The Rise of the Penitentiary in New York by W. David Lewis
- The History of United States prison systems
