= The Rise of the Penitentiary =

1992 book by Adam J. Hirsch

The Rise of the Penitentiary: Prisons and Punishment in Early America
- 1992 Book jacket
- Author: Adam J. Hirsch
- Subject: Corrections, Prisons, Massachusetts History - Prisons United States History
- Genre: Sociohistorical nonfiction
- Set in: Northeastern United States, Massachusetts
- Published: June 24, 1992
- Publisher: Yale University Press
- Publication place: United States
- Media type: Print, e-book, audio
- Pages: 243
- ISBN: 9780300042979
- OCLC: 24905782
- Website: Official website

The Rise of the Penitentiary: Prisons and Punishment in Early America is a history of the origins of the penitentiary in the United States, depicting its beginnings and expansion. It was written by Adam J. Hirsch and published by Yale University Press on June 24, 1992.

== Synopsis ==
This book explores the ideas used to justify imprisoning people as punishment in the early United States. Hirsch, the author, uses Massachusetts as the template. He traces how ideas about prisons transition from being discussed in theory to becoming physical buildings and implemented systems. Hirsch also shows that there wasn't just one compelling reason behind favoring penitentiaries as a solution. There were many conflicting beliefs. Thus, this made prison philosophy complicated and ultimately deficient.

Hirsch argues that the idea of using prisons as punishment was based on three different lines of thinking that came together. First, there were ideas from 17th century England about workhouses. It was believed that workhouses reduce crime and poverty by teaching new skills to people who were incarcerated. Second, there was the 18th century European concept of "rational criminology." This approach suggested that if punishments were consistent and not based on the death penalty, crime could be controlled by the state. Finally, derived from late 18th century England was the idea of "reclamation." This philanthropic belief held that prisons could not only retrain people, but actually change their entire personality and character.

== See also ==
- Discipline and Punish by Michel Foucault
- Penitentiaries, Reformatories, and Chain Gangs by Mark Colvin
- The Rise of the Penitentiary in New York by W. David Lewis
- The History of United States prison systems
- The Penitentiary
