= Aryan Brotherhood of Texas =

American white-supremacist and neo-Nazi criminal gang

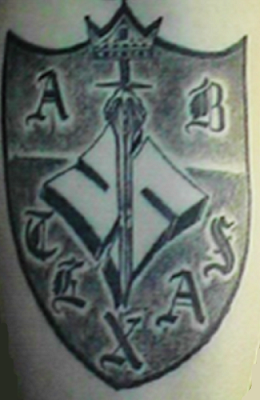
- Aryan Brotherhood of Texas tattoo
- Founded: 1981; 45 years ago
- Founding location: Eastham Unit (Texas)
- Years active: 1981–present
- Territory: Texas and throughout the federal prison system
- Ethnicity: White American
- Membership (est.): 3,500
- Activities: Drug trafficking, Arms trafficking, murder, extortion, robbery, theft and identity theft
- Allies: Gulf Cartel
- Rivals: Aryan Circle
- Notable members: Mark Anthony Stroman; Carl Wayne Buntion; David Leonard Wood

The Aryan Brotherhood of Texas (ABT) is an American white supremacist and Neo-Nazi prison and street gang. According to the Anti-Defamation League the Aryan Brotherhood of Texas is one of the largest and most violent neo-Nazi white supremacist prison gangs and organized criminal enterprises in the United States, responsible for numerous murders and other violent crimes.

== History ==
Despite the similarity in their names, the Aryan Brotherhood of Texas is not affiliated with the Aryan Brotherhood (AB), a separate and also notorious prison gang and crime syndicate founded in California in the 1960s with branches in the federal and state prison systems and outside prison walls. In 1981, a group of Texas inmates asked for permission to start an Aryan Brotherhood chapter in Texas. The AB denied their request but the Texas inmates formed it anyway. The ABT was nonetheless established in the 1980s, following the desegregation of Texas prisons and the dismantling of the "Building Tender", or Trusty system, a system in which prison officials used other inmates to help maintain order in the prisons. These major and more or less simultaneous changes created an atmosphere of uncertainty and a lack of control that proved fertile breeding grounds for Black, Hispanic and White race-based prison gangs. These gangs soon became the top predators in the Texas prison system.

The various white gangs, with names like the Aryan Society and the Aryan Brothers, mostly adopted a relatively crude white supremacist ideology. In the early to mid-1980s, most of the members of these two gangs united to become the Aryan Brotherhood of Texas, while others left out of the merger later helped form the rival Aryan Circle (AC) prison gang. From its beginning, the ABT emerged as one of the most violent gangs in the Texas Department of Criminal Justice, committing 13 murders in 1984–85 alone.

In March 1985, prospect Virgil Barfield carried out an Aryan Brotherhood of Texas order to kill Calvin Massey, who both at the time were trying to get in the brotherhood. Massey had "stood up the constitution" by getting a tattoo before he even joined the brotherhood. Barfield stabbed Massey 42 times. The violent attack was caught on camera. The video clip helped prosecutors convict Barfield for the murder of Massey. Virgil Barfield was sentenced to life in prison.

The ABT's first war was with the black gang Mandingo Warriors, who were beaten to the point of near extermination within the prison system. The Aryan Circle was the next major war, which lasted roughly 8 years (1986–1994). The ABT would take their focus off of AC for short periods of time to deal with lesser but still deadly threats, and this gave AC time to regroup. The ABT was in a state of war with multiple gangs who saw an opportunity to try to take them on while they were being weakened during those 8 years. Still, none has ever won a war against them, though the Mexican Mafia and Aryan Circle came away with "peace treaties" from them in the early 1990s. Texas Mafia (TM) was "parked" system wide, meaning they were no longer allowed to recruit members, after the ABT–TM wars in 1995/1996. Then A.C. murdered a member of ABT in 1998 on McConnell Unit. War raged until 2009. Then, yet again, war would come to these two groups, starting in 2015 and still going.

In 2001, ABT member Mark Anthony Stroman was sentenced to death for his killing spree on Middle Eastern people. He claimed it was in retaliation for the September 11 terrorist attacks. However all three of his targets were of South Asian descent. Stroman was executed by lethal injection on May 20, 2011.

On September 21, 2006, former members of the ABT were charged with the death of a young woman named Breanna Taylor. According to investigations conducted by the authorities, Taylor was tortured, sexually assaulted, and murdered by ex-ABT gang members. After she was killed, they poured acid on her body, and then put her body in a tub, poured cement on it and dumped it into a river. Dale Jameton pleaded guilty and received a life sentence, and Jennifer McClellan was sentenced to 20 years in prison. Dale "Tiger" Jameton is being held at the Alfred D. Hughes Unit in Gatesville, Texas.

In 2012, Terry Sillers, a former General in the ABT, was arrested after leading police on a wild motorcycle chase near Fort Worth. In exchange for cooperating with authorities against a gang that he says betrayed him, he was sentenced to 10 years in federal prison.

In 2018, federal prosecutors in the Northern District of Texas obtained indictments and convictions of more than 50 individuals as part of a multi-agency crackdown on white supremacist organizations including the Aryan Circle, Aryan Brotherhood of Texas, Aryan Brotherhood, Peckerwoods, Soldiers of Aryan Culture and the Dirty White Boys. The investigation was handled by numerous law enforcement agencies coordinated by the Texas Anti-Gang Center, and more than 190 kilograms of meth, about $376,500, and 31 firearms were seized. The indictments included conspiracy to distribute methamphetamine and other illegal narcotics. It was the nation’s largest prosecution of white supremacist gang affiliates.

== Ranking structure ==
The Aryan Brotherhood of Texas is run by five Generals, collectively known as the "Steering Committee" or "The Wheel". Each General is given control over a region of Texas, each region having a number of prisons within the Texas Department of Criminal Justice, as well as all of the counties that comprises the region. Each General has two Majors, one "Inside Major" and one "Outside Major". The Inside Major (who is in prison, and therefore knows the intricacies of relationships between the gangs on his units, which makes him better suited to make decisions for those units as a whole) oversees family business on the units in his region. The Outside Major does the same for the cities in his region. Both Majors report to their General, who uses the information to keep his region running smoothly. Each prison unit with members is assigned a unit Captain, who in turn assigns a Lieutenant. The Lieutenant is the lowest permanent rank within the ABT, though on larger units and in bigger cities, the Lieutenant may appoint Sergeants to assist him in the day-to-day affairs of the gang.

== Membership ==
The Aryan Brotherhood of Texas has an estimated membership of approximately 3,500, concentrated primarily in Texas but also in the prisons of neighboring states, in particular New Mexico. According to the Bureau of Alcohol, Tobacco, Firearms and Explosives (ATF), there are 2,600 members in Texas prisons and another 180 in federal prisons, as of 2012.

A Prospect, or prospective member is someone under the protection of the ABT, responsible for following any/all direct orders given by an active member, who is being considered for membership into the organization. Typically, whenever there is "dirty work" to be done, such as an assault or murder, more often than not, prospects are used. When the prospect is utilized in such a way, it is often referred to as "earning one's bones".

== See also ==
- 211 Crew
- Aryan Brotherhood
- Aryan Circle
- European Kindred
- Nazi Lowriders
- Public Enemy No. 1
- Soldiers of Aryan Culture
- Universal Aryan Brotherhood
