= Mexikanemi =

Mexican-American prison and street gang

- Founded: 1984; 41 years ago
- Founder: Heriberto Huerta
- Founding location: Huntsville Unit, Texas, United States
- Years active: 1984–present
- Territory: Texas
- Ethnicity: Mexican and Mexican American
- Membership (est.): 4,000
- Activities: Drug trafficking, human trafficking, loansharking, money laundering, extortion, murder
- Allies: Gulf Cartel; Juárez Cartel; Mexican Mafia; Los Zetas
- Rivals: Nuestra Familia; Texas Syndicate

Mexikanemi, also known as the Texas Mexican Mafia, is a Mexican-American prison and street gang established in the Texas state prison system in 1984. It functions separately from the original California Mexican Mafia, and members consider themselves primarily tied to the area of Aztlán, formerly Mexican territories in the southwestern United States. The group engages in a wide range of illegal activities including drug trafficking, loan sharking, and money laundering.

== Overview ==
The structure, rules, and procedures of the Mexikanemi are formalized through their written constitution. As stated therein, "everything will be organized because we are an organization".

=== Hierarchy ===
The hierarchy of the group begins with the president and vice president and then proceeds through general, captain, lieutenant, and sergeant. All other members not occupying one of these posts are considered soldiers. All others who are not members are prospects in the process of being adopted into the group as a member.

President through captain functions as a ranking system, wherein the title is attached to the individual and follows the individual in all their doings. However, lieutenant and sergeant are posts, which is to say that they are attached to geographical locations such as cities, ranches, buildings or institutions and remain with that location regardless of where the individual may go. When the individual leaves that location they no longer retain their title unless they then assume the same position at a different location.

The posts of sergeant and lieutenant are semi-democratic/semi-merit positions. These posts are democratic in that they are filled and can be vacated, according to the constitution, by a simple majority vote of the group that is or will be led by that person. These posts are meritocratic in that they may also be vacated by decree made by any person who holds the rank of captain or higher. Any person who vacates a post through a vote of no confidence, or through removal by a person who holds the rank of captain or higher, may never hold any other post.

All members of the group, regardless of post or responsibility, are explicitly placed below the authority of the constitution and are considered fundamentally equal, "Above all else, we are all equal and it is necessary that we all participate to the best of our abilities to be able to advance and make progress through Mexikanemi".

=== Recruitment ===
The Mexikanemi utilize a distributed recruitment system based on democratic vote and the approval authority of lieutenants. According to their constitution, any member in good standing may recommend someone as a prospect so long as they are ethnically Mexican. The prospect is then introduced to the leadership and membership of their area and begins the 120-day process of becoming a full member. During this process, the person recommending the prospect is responsible for educating and indoctrinating them into the group. They are also responsible for disciplining the prospect should it be necessary.

At 90 days, the lieutenant of the area begins a 30-day investigative process regarding the prospect to determine whether they are "good". At the end of this the group votes on whether the prospect shall be admitted as a full member. Any member who does not vote must provide a reason for abstaining.

=== Income ===
Mexikanemi is explicitly committed to gaining its revenue through any means possible. As the constitution states:

Being a criminal organization we work in any criminal aspect or interest for the benefit and advancement of Mexikanemi. we shall deal in drugs, contract killing, large scale robbery, gambling, weapons and in everything imaginable.

A considerable amount of funding comes into the organization through the means or extortion through a method referred to as "The Dime". By the rule of "The Dime", all illicit activity taking place in the group's territory, even by non-members, is taxed at a rate of 10% which is to be given to the group. This rule is strictly enforced, for example, in 1999 Mexikanemi member Manuel Vasquez strangled a local cannabis dealer, Juanita Ybarra, to death with a phone cord for refusing to pay "The Dime." Vasquez would later receive the death penalty for the crime.

== Emblems and tattoos ==
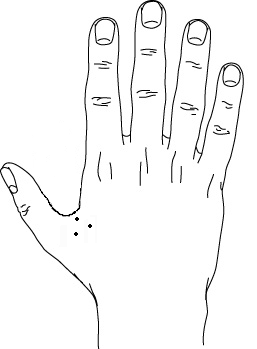
A Hand Tattoo Consisting of Three Dots

The Mexikanemi use a number of insignia to represent their affiliation. Members are permitted but not required to receive tattoos indicating their membership in the gang. At the most basic level is the word "Mexikanemi" itself or various abbreviations therefor. These include the letter M as a single letter or as a pair (i.e. MM for Mexican Mafia); the letters "eme" (Spanish for M), or the number 13 either in Arabic, Roman, or Aztec numerals (M is the 13th letter of the alphabet). The number 13 may also be represented in any number of graphical depictions combining one of something and three of something. For example, one dot under the left hand and three dots under the right hand.

A number of additional symbols stem from the group's cultural and ethnic heritage. Symbols such as the eagle or the serpent may be allusions to the Mexican flag. Additionally, as the group places emphasis on their pre-Spanish Aztec cultural heritage, a wide range of Aztec art, symbols, and architecture may be employed.

== Investigations and prosecutions ==
=== 2012 indictments ===
In 2012 numerous law enforcement agencies collaborated in an investigation that resulted in the arrest of 25 alleged members of the group including a local law enforcement officer, Michael Mares of the Onalaska, Texas police. The indictment alleged that Mares conspired with the group to provide them with "hand guns, assault rifles, hand restraints and even internal police information", and that the group as a whole was working to "traffic drugs and carry out other illegal gang business, including selling numerous assault rifles, and detonation cord".
