= Dead Man Incorporated =

Predominantly white prison and street gang founded in Maryland, US

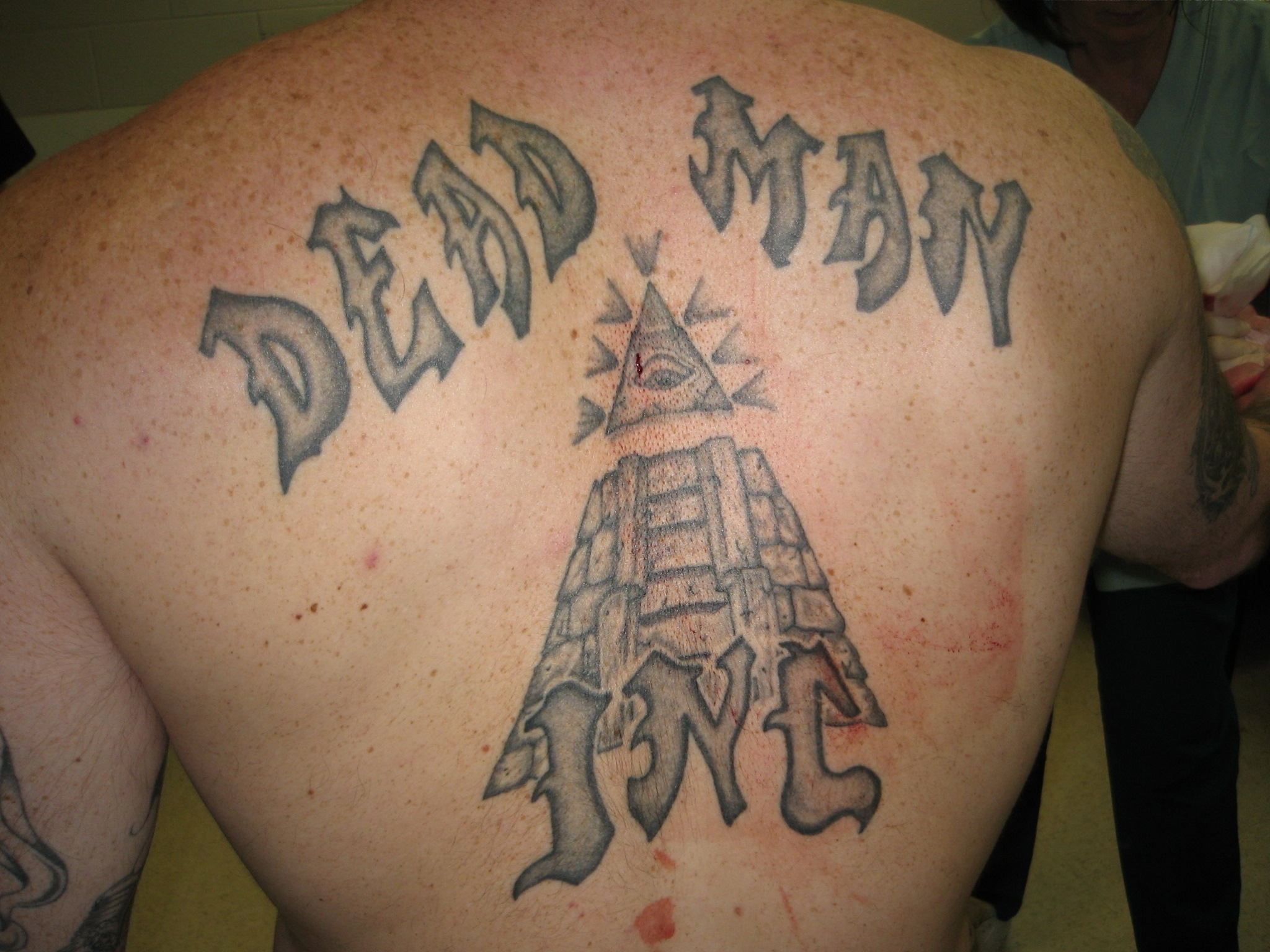
- Dead Man Incorporated gang tattoo
- Founded: 2000; 26 years ago
- Founding location: Maryland Department of Public Safety and Correctional Services
- Years active: 2000–present
- Territory: Maryland, Virginia and West Virginia
- Ethnicity: White American
- Membership (est.): approximately 370
- Activities: Drug trafficking, murder, assault, intimidation, contract killing
- Allies: Black Guerrilla Family

Dead Man Inc. or DMI is a predominantly white organized crime enterprise. It was founded in prison and has members in many correctional facilities and streets throughout Maryland, as well as other states in the U.S.

== Origins ==
DMI was founded by Perry Roark, James Sweeney and Brian Jordan in the late 1990s in the Maryland Department of Corrections. Roark was a close associate of the Black Guerrilla Family and received permission from them to start an organization to unite white inmates in the system. The group grew in size quickly due to infiltration by a man named Michael Quinn, who had joined to secure protection for himself. He recruited anybody who wanted to join in every location. Sweeney sought numbers as opposed to quality as he felt secure with numbers and thought numbers brought strength.

== Structure ==
The gang hierarchy is divided into many sections, with the Supreme Commanders (SC) at the very top. These are the gang's founders Perry Roark, James Sweeney and Bryan Jordan. DMI members in each facility are collectively called a "unit". Each unit is led by a commander, followed by lieutenant, field general, sergeant-at-arms, and a finance officer. Around 2007, a new position known as the "elders" has been established between the Supreme Commanders and the units, in order to help direct orders down the hierarchy.

== Criminal activities ==
Initially, DMI worked for the BGF, but soon began offering those services to other gangs by targeting rivals and correctional staff. This led to entry into drug trafficking and other crimes to advance their own agendas as their size and power increased.

The once tight-knit structure of the group has broken down with the explosion in numbers, as members compete with one another leading to violence between members. Fueling these internal divisions is the fact that leaders disagreed about the direction of the gang. Perry Roark wanted to return the gang to its former position alongside the BGF, while other leaders like James Sweeney want to adopt a white supremacist ideology.

A federal grand jury in Baltimore charged 22 defendants with conspiracy to participate in a violent racketeering enterprise. All but one defendant are also charged with conspiring to distribute drugs. The indictment was returned on October 6, 2011, and unsealed upon the arrests of seven defendants and the execution of seven search warrants. Eleven defendants were previously in custody and four defendants are still at large. The highly secret organization has begun to recruit members on the streets of Baltimore City, Baltimore County, and Anne Arundel County; also moving their power and structure to the correction centers all throughout West Virginia. It was brought to Huntington, West Virginia in 2007 by the man only known as Roc, and became the biggest threat and fastest growing organization in the state. The organization is now growing and has over 4,000 members incarcerated and unknown numbers out on the streets. They are infiltrating government organizations to tear them down from the inside, moving operations into small communities like Dundalk and Essex, MD, and taking advantage of the drug trade and murder-for-hire business where they are employed by other gangs for protection and "hits".

DMI member John Thomas Gordon was sentenced to 6 months in prison for his participation in the January 6 United States Capitol attack; President Donald Trump granted clemency to all of the January 6 defendants in 2025.

== See also ==
- Prison gangs in the United States
- Gangland
