= European Kindred =

United States white supremacist prison and street gang

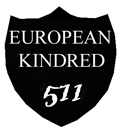
- European Kindred emblem
- Founded: 1998; 28 years ago
- Founder: English.Reeves
- Named after: EOCI
- Founding location: Snake River Correctional Institution, Oregon, United States
- Years active: 1998–present
- Territory: Oregon
- Ethnicity: White American
- Membership (est.): 500
- Activities: Drug trafficking, dog fighting, extortion, murder, assaults, home invasions, hate crimes, money laundering, assault rifle conversion, silencers
- Notable members: English

The European Kindred (EK) is a prison and street gang that began in the Oregon prison system.

== Overview ==
As of 2006, parole and probation officers report the gang may have around 500 members in the Oregon prison system. EK members have a propensity for violence and are one of the most powerful gangs within the Oregon Department of Corrections.

The group was founded in 1998 by David Patrick Kennedy and another inmate of Eastern Oregon's Snake River Correctional Institution. Membership in the EK is nearly exclusively male, and membership is restricted to those with no more than one-sixteenth Native American ancestry. The group has a formal structure, rules, and ritual. It is highly secretive.

The gang has a reputation for extortion, assaults, moving contraband goods throughout the Oregon correctional institutions, and dog fighting. New members are encouraged to "earn their bones" (their membership) through hostile action consistent with the group's cause.

A 2016 BBC documentary show entitled "A Black and White Killing" focused on the trial (and eventual conviction) of an EK gang member accused of the murder of a young black man. The documentary interviewed an ex-gang member, who stated that EK operates an unbreakable policy of 'Blood in, Blood out'. This rule requires that all potential new gang members must 'shed blood' as a condition of entry to the gang, typically in directed attacks made against members of rival gangs ('blood in'). The former member went on to explain that an attempt to leave the gang is seen as a betrayal of the 'brotherhood' of all remaining gang members - even those who are members of other gangs. The price for attempting to leave the gang, once inducted, is one's life. The spilling of the deserting gang member's blood (during their subsequent murder) constitutes the requirement for 'blood out'.

There is no documented information indicating EK members attack prison guards. Outside of prison, EK members appear to be involved in the distribution and possibly manufacture of methamphetamine.

EK members mark their membership with the initials EK in a shield on their right calf or on other parts of their bodies. Women are associated with the group, but are marked with the initials FW. The initials represent prison slang: F stands for "feather", prison slang for female, and W stands for "wood", prison slang for a caucasian.

Released members are attempting to recruit new young members in prisons, jails and on the street. According to the Portland Tribune, EK members claim that they use high schools in the Portland, Oregon area to find new recruits.

== Notable crimes ==
=== Murder of Anthony Cleo Wilson ===
In 2002, a county grand jury indicted Joshua Robert Brown, a 21-year-old, on charges of killing Anthony Cleo Wilson, a 47-year-old African-American. Brown joined European Kindred in 2000 while serving a four-year sentence for robbery. After 3 weeks from being released, police claimed that Brown stabbed Wilson to death. Authorities say Brown's motive may have been that Wilson, who'd been busted for possession and manufacture of narcotics, sold him some bad or phony drugs, but they also believe it may have been a hate crime.

=== Murder of Larnell Bruce ===
On August 10, 2016, European Kindred member Russell Courtier, 38, egged on by his girlfriend Colleen Hunt, 35, used his 1991 Jeep Wrangler to run over 19-year-old African-American Larnell Bruce. This incident occurred after Larnell propelled Russell’s head into a window, causing a concussion. Larnell Bruce then walked off after the encounter at a 7-Eleven in Gresham, Oregon. Security cameras showed the teen attempting to avoid the Jeep and escape before being hit. Police arrived after receiving a call from an employee of the 7-Eleven about the incident and found the teen bleeding, critically injured and lying in the street. Trials were eventually completed in March 2019. On March 13, Hunt pled guilty to manslaughter. Six days later, Courtier was convicted of murder and hate crime.

== See also ==
- Prison gangs in the United States
