= Texas Syndicate =

Mexican-American prison gang

- Founded: 1978; 48 years ago
- Founding location: Folsom State Prison, California, United States
- Years active: 1978–present
- Territory: Southwestern United States
- Ethnicity: Mexican American
- Membership (est.): 1,300+
- Activities: Drug trafficking, extortion, prostitution, protection, gambling, and contract murder
- Allies: Dirty White Boys; Gulf Cartel; Texas Mafia
- Rivals: Aryan Brotherhood; Nuestra Familia; Mexican Mafia; Mexikanemi; Tango Blast

The Texas Syndicate (Spanish: Sindicato Tejano) is a Texas prison gang consisting of predominantly Mexican American membership. The Texas Syndicate, unlike the Mexican Mafia or Nuestra Familia, has been more associated or allied with Mexican immigrant prisoners.

== Overview ==
The Texas Syndicate was established at Folsom State Prison in California in 1978 in direct response to the other California prison gangs, notably the Aryan Brotherhood and Mexican Mafia, which were attempting to prey on native Texas inmates. The Syndicate is the oldest Texan prison gang. The Texas Syndicate has approximately 1,300 members, the majority of whom are Mexican American males aged between 20 and 40. While the gangs maintains its headquarters in California, there are around 1,000 members in prisons and jails throughout Texas, with many others operating on the outside. The Texas Syndicate also operates in state and federal prisons across the United States, with significant activity being reported at FCI Oakdale in Louisiana and San Quentin State Prison in California, as well as some representation in the Florida Department of Corrections. As a street gang, heavy activity has been reported in Austin, Corpus Christi, the Rio Grande Valley and the Dallas Fort Worth area in Texas.

=== Criminal activity ===
Development of the Texas Syndicate was initially motivated by self-protection against the historical "building tenders" in prison. After building tenders disappeared due to a court order, the Syndicate's activities turned to drug trafficking, extortion, prostitution, protection, illegal gambling, and contract killing. Released or parole members who generate money for the gang must surrender a 10% tax ("the dime") of all proceeds toward the Texas Syndicate in prison. Gang members smuggle multikilogram-quantities of powdered cocaine, heroin, and methamphetamine, and multiton-quantities of marijuana from Mexico into the U.S. for distribution inside and outside prison. Gang members have a direct working relationship with associates and/or members of the Gulf Cartel. Syndicate members have been known to carry out contract killings for Los Zetas.

== Structure ==
TS has a paramilitary structure, headed by a president and vice president elected by the general membership. Prison units are individually controlled by a local chairman and vice chairman. Beneath them in the gang hierarchy are captains, lieutenants, sergeants of arms, and numerous soldiers.

The history of the group and documented acts of violence in other jurisdictions warrant their certification as a Security Threat Group. Receipt of inmates on interstate compact and the current membership in groups with Hispanic and Latino supremacy ideology lend to the threat of an organizing TS within our facilities. The main activities of the TS are centered on drug trafficking, extortion, protection rackets, and internal discipline and contract murdering.

=== Rules ===
Texas Syndicate members abide by a constitution requiring members to:

- Be a Texan
- Always remain a member
- Place the Texas Syndicate before anything else
- Understand that the Texas Syndicate is always in the right
- Wear the Texas Syndicate tattoo
- Never let a member down
- Respect other members
- Keep all gang information within the group

Additionally, gang leadership is determined by democratic elections, requiring a unanimous decision. Recruitment is conducted through social ties and involves a background check to screen for informants.

== See also ==
- Prison gangs in the United States
- Gulf Cartel
