= 211 Crew =

American white supremacist prison gang

- 211 Crew emblem
- Founded: 1995; 31 years ago
- Founding location: Denver, Colorado, United States
- Years active: 1995–present
- Territory: Colorado
- Ethnicity: European American
- Membership (est.): 1,000
- Activities: Murder, weapons trafficking, drug trafficking, kidnapping, domestic violence, robbery, assault
- Notable members: Michael Collins

The 211 Crew, also known as the Aryan Empire, Aryan Alliance or Brotherhood of Aryan Alliance is an American white supremacist prison gang, active both in and out of prison, that was formed in 1995 at Colorado's Denver County Jail. It was linked to several high-profile murders and criminal investigations. Those included the assassination of Colorado Department of Corrections head Tom Clements. Due to a threatening letter sent by a Texas Aryan Brotherhood member, it was suspected to be linked to similar assassinations of Texas district attorney Mike McLelland, and his assistant prosecutor Mark Hasse, but a former Justice of the Peace was eventually indicted for those murders.

== Racism and ideology ==
When founded, the gang embraced symbols traditionally associated with Irish, Nazi and Viking culture, some members have tattoos of shamrocks, Viking horns, swastikas and/or other Nazi sigils. Members refer to each other as "Mugs". There is no prohibition on members sleeping with other races. Many 211 Crew members have interracial children. Many have classified 211 Crew as a white supremacist prison gang. However, 211 Crew members, including its founders, have been documented with ties to black inmates. Israel Davis, father of Benjamin Davis, has stated that his son is not a racist and has two black siblings. However, 211 Crew members have also been linked to racially motivated murders of African Americans, making the gang's official stance on race unclear.

== Formation ==
The gang was formed in 1995 after founding member Benjamin Davis was beaten and nearly killed in a racially motivated attack by a black inmate. Davis was jumped and beaten with a sock stuffed full of soap bars, resulting in a badly broken jaw. Davis decided to form a gang in order to protect himself, and other white inmates, from the black and Latino gangs. 211 Crew began as a deception to fool black and Latino gangs into thinking that a white gang was present to protect white inmates. As the rumor grew within the institution, men soon started asking about membership and 211 Crew became a prison gang. As members got released they started recruiting on the street level. According to 2-11s own lore the gang was named because Benjamin Davis and his co-defendants were all charged with a string of robberies. Davis was a former member of the Bloods gang and formed a minority style gang with his co-defendants. Originally it was called 2-11 Irish Crew but as they recruited people without Irish heritage it just became 2-11 Crew.

Eventually 2-11 merged with the Colorado prison gangs Aryan Syndicate and ANP (American Nazi Party but no relation to the group founded by Rockwell). The new group was called Aryan Empire. Eventually the gang just went back to being called 2-11.

Benjamin Davis was transferred to Wyoming State Penitentiary in Rawlins where he was found dead of an apparent suicide in August of 2017.

== Notable incidents ==
In 2013, 211 Crew member Evan Spencer Ebel murdered a local pizza delivery man in order to use his work clothes and paraphernalia as a disguise. Ebel then drove to the home of Colorado Department of Corrections head Tom Clements and called at the door, under the ruse of delivering a pizza. When Clements answered, Ebel shot him several times. After murdering Clements on the steps of his own home, Ebel immediately fled. Authorities caught up to him on a Texas highway, possibly on his way to Mexico. Ebel refused to surrender and engaged in a protracted high-speed car chase with pursuing law enforcement officers. The pursuit came to an end after Ebel crashed into a gravel truck. Following the accident, Ebel began a gunfight with police, being shot multiple times in the process. Ebel was taken to the hospital, but never regained consciousness and was removed from life support the following day.
