= Aryan Circle =

White supremacist, neo-Nazi prison gang in the United States

- Aryan Circle emblem
- Founded: 1985; 41 years ago
- Founder: Mark "Cowboy" Gaspard
- Founding location: Texas Department of Corrections
- Years active: 1985–present
- Territory: Primarily Texas, with a smaller presence in several other states
- Ethnicity: White American
- Membership (est.): 1,400
- Activities: Drug trafficking, contraband smuggling, theft, robbery, extortion, murder, assault, hate crime
- Rivals: Aryan Brotherhood of Texas

The Aryan Circle is a white supremacist, Neo-Nazi prison gang spread throughout many U.S. correctional facilities.

The Aryan Circle was founded by Mark "Cowboy" Gaspard in 1985 in the Texas Department of Corrections as a splinter group of the Aryan Brotherhood of Texas (ABT). During the 1980s the ABT had shifted focus away from overt crime towards religion. The Aryan Circle split from the Aryan Brotherhood to maintain criminal gang status and white supremacist beliefs, and to oppose African American and Hispanic prison gangs.

The gang began growing during the 1990s, becoming the second-largest prison gang in Texas by 2008, with 730 confirmed members in state prisons. The gang also had an operational presence in neighboring states and isolated members throughout the country. The Anti-Defamation League estimated their 2009 nationwide membership to be approximately 1,400, including 150 confirmed members in federal prisons.

== Membership and identifiers ==
Membership in the group usually requires an assault on an enemy of the organization. The Aryan Circle touts four tenets: brotherhood, solidarity, loyalty, and dedication; these beliefs are represented on each side of a diamond patch.

Aryan Circle members sport common white supremacist/separatist tattoos such as swastikas, SS lightning bolts, and Celtic or Germanic symbols. The main patch of the Aryan Circle is a diamond with wood in grade under the heart with a swastika and the letters "AC" in the center of a circle. However, due to the group being classified as a Security Threat Group, many of its members no longer have the patch tattooed. Older members will have a small circle just below their left pectoral. They also acknowledge each other with patch numbers.

== Criminal activities ==
Aryan Circle members have been convicted of conspiracy to manufacture and distribute large amounts of methamphetamine.

On August 10, 2007, Aryan Circle member Dennis Leighton Clem killed two police officers at a Budget Inn Motel in Bastrop, Louisiana in a shootout, in which he was also killed. Clem and his girlfriend were on the run after Clem shot at an SUV with black teenagers who had opened fire on an acquaintance, wounding him seriously, in front of his house in Houston on July 14. Two of the assaulting teenagers were killed, one was wounded.

== Rivals ==
Although the Aryan Circle was created by white supremacists, in the mid-1990s it was caught up in a bloody war with another white supremacist prison gang called the White Knights that cost the life of one White Knights member.

== See also ==
- Aryan Brotherhood
