= List of known gang members =

This is a list of known gang members. The term gang member refers to a criminal who is a member of a crime organization. The terms are widely used in reference to people associated or affiliated with street gangs, prison gangs, and biker gangs.

- David Barksdale
- Nicky Barnes
- Brandon Bernard
- Tyler Bingham
- Vivian Blake
- Maurice Boucher
- Harry Joseph Bowman
- Carl Wayne Buntion
- Yves Buteau
- John Butler
- Rodolfo Cadena
- Genaro Ruiz Camacho
- Ruben Cavazos
- Donald Eugene Chambers
- Michael Chen
- Chen Chi-li
- Samuel Christian
- Peter Chong
- Raymond "Shrimp Boy" Chow
- Christopher Coke
- David Barron Corona
- Tiequon Cox
- Ion Croitoru
- Nicky Cruz
- Rolando Cruz
- Duane "Keffe D" Davis
- Rayful Edmond
- Johnny Eng
- Rene Enriquez
- Pedro Espinoza
- Luis Felipe
- Guy Fisher
- Joe Fong
- Jeff Fort
- Kenneth Foster
- Clayton Fountain
- Alex García
- Juan Martin Garcia
- Anthony Garrett
- Juan Garza
- Jay Goldstein
- Bobby Gore
- Gabriel Granillo
- Mark Guardado
- Willie Haggart
- Shauntay Henderson
- Larry Hoover
- George Jackson
- Jan Krogh Jensen
- Bumpy Johnson
- Dany Kane
- King Tone
- Tung Kuei-sen
- Jose Landa-Rodriguez
- Bill Lee
- Michael Ljunggren
- Antônio Francisco Bonfim Lopes
- Frank Lucas
- Luis Macedo
- Santiago Villalba Mederos
- Ramadan Abdel Rehim Mansour
- Raymond Márquez
- Alpo Martinez
- Howard Mason
- Greg Mathis
- Frank Matthews
- Robert Edward Maxfield
- Timothy Joseph McGhee
- Kenneth McGriff
- José Medellín
- Jeremy Meeks
- Lea Mek
- Benjamin Melendez
- Richard Merla
- Barry Mills
- Felix Mitchell
- Thomas Möller
- Erismar Rodrigues Moreira
- Joe "Pegleg" Morgan
- Dontae Morris
- Jørn Nielsen
- O. G. Mack
- Michael O'Farrell
- Javier Ovando
- José Padilla
- Anthony Porter
- Emigdio Preciado Jr.
- Alfredo Prieto
- Edwin Ramos
- Eduardo Ravelo
- Wallace Rice
- Luis J. Rodriguez
- "Freeway" Rick Ross
- Shorty Rossi
- Joe Saenz
- Robert Sandifer
- Kaboni Savage
- Sanyika Shakur
- Thomas Silverstein
- Aimé Simard
- Colton Simpson
- Slobbery Jim
- Wolodumir "Walter" Stadnick
- Binyamin Stimler
- Mark Anthony Stroman
- Darren Taylor
- Regis Deon Thomas
- Jemeker Thompson
- Jim Tinndahn
- Yves Trudeau
- Alex Vella
- Christopher Vialva
- Troy Victorino
- Raymond Washington
- Damien Watts
- David Wax
- Damian Williams
- Kenneth Williams
- Stanley Williams
- Marion Wilson
- Ronell Wilson
- Yang Fuqing

== See also ==
- List of gangs in the United States
