= Rene Enriquez =

Rene Enriquez may refer to:

- Rene Enriquez (mobster), American Mexican Mafia member
- René Enríquez, Nicaraguan-born American television actor of the 1970s and 1980s
