= Pelican Bay State Prison =

Prison in California operated by the CDCR

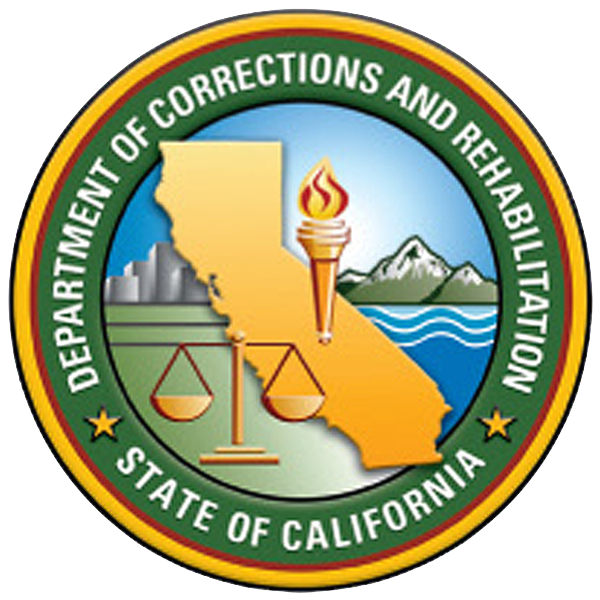
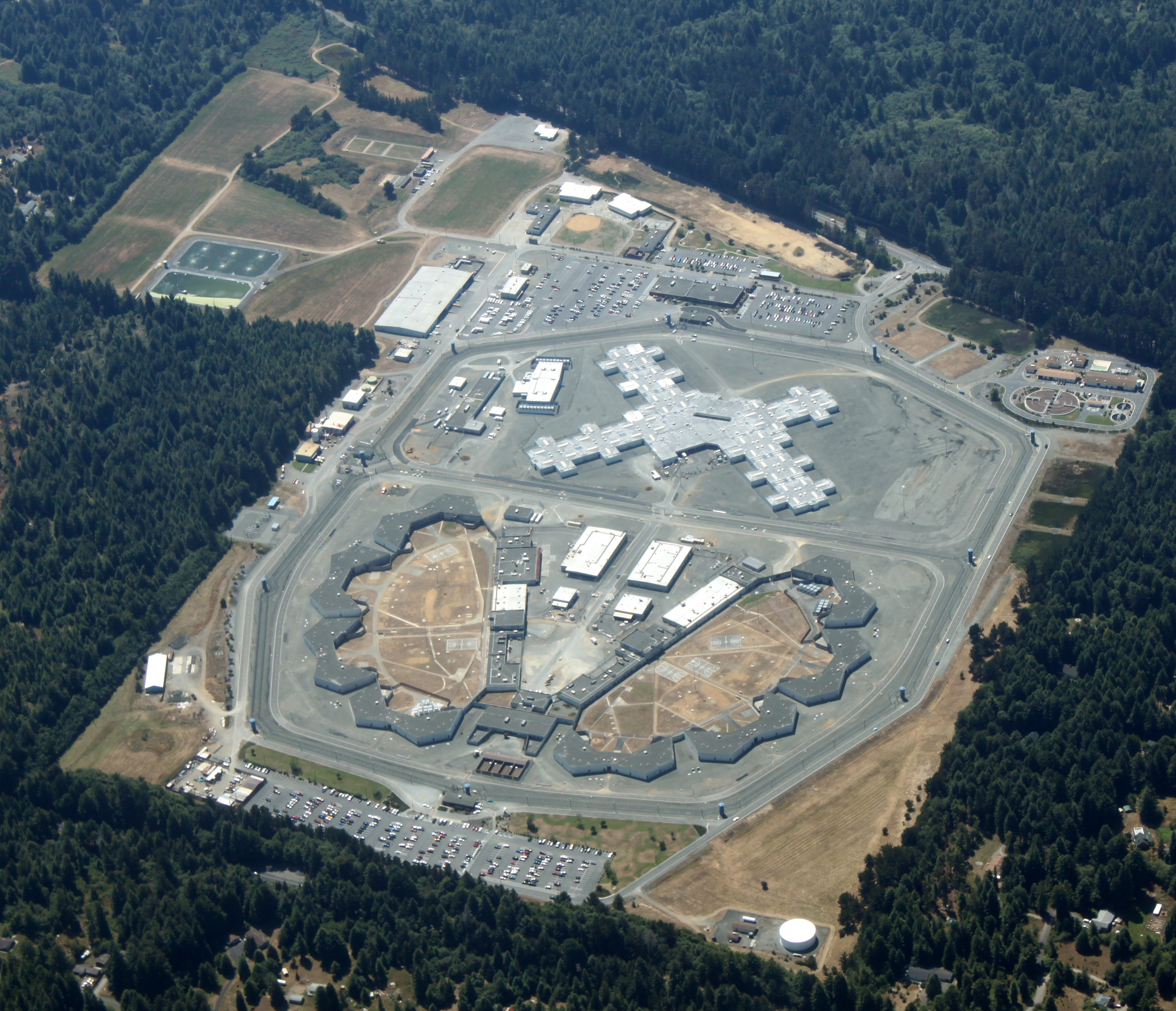
- Interactive map of Pelican Bay State Prison
- Location: Crescent City, Del Norte County, California; 41.855°N 124.15°W
- Status: Operational
- Security class: Supermax
- Capacity: 2,380
- Population: 1,711 (71.9% capacity) (January 31, 2023)
- Opened: 1989
- Managed by: California Department of Corrections and Rehabilitation
- Warden: Stephen Smith
- Website: https://www.cdcr.ca.gov/facility-locator/pbsp/

Pelican Bay State Prison (PBSP) is a supermax prison in Crescent City, California. The 275-acre (111-hectare) prison takes its name from a shallow bay on the Pacific coast, about two miles (three kilometers) to the west.

== Facilities ==
Location of Crescent City in Del Norte county and location of Del Norte in California

The prison is located in a detached section of Crescent City, several miles north of the main urban area and just south of the Oregon border.

Pelican Bay State Prison opened in 1989. It covers 275 acres (111 hectares), and grounds and operations are physically divided.

An X-shaped cluster of buildings comprise a quarter of the prison's facilities, and are known as the Security Housing Unit, or SHU. This facility contains 1,056 solitary confinement cells, organized into 132 eight-cell pods. Each cell is 8 ft × 10 ft (2.4 m × 3.0 m) and contains a concrete ledge with a foam pad to be used as a bed, a steel combination sink and toilet, and two concrete cubes that serve as a desk and chair.

Armed guards monitor six pods of 48 cells at once from central control booths, through perforated steel doors that make it easy for guards to see in, but difficult for prisoners to see out. Cell doors are controlled remotely. Prisoners can be allowed out to shower or to exercise in each 8 ft × 20 ft (2.4 m × 6.1 m) pod's solitary exercise yard.

Half of the prison holds Level IV (maximum security) inmates in a general population environment with two-man cells. The remaining prison houses Level II inmates in an open-cell, dormitory-style facility for 500 individuals. Level I (minimum security) prisoners are housed in a 400 man facility outside of the main perimeter of the prison.

As of March 2022, 1,852 people were incarcerated at Pelican Bay State Prison. 1,112 (60%) of those inmates were Level IV (maximum security) prisoners, 290 of whom were located in the Security Housing Unit.

== History ==
=== Early brutality ===
After Pelican Bay State Prison opened in 1989, guards eager to assert their dominance over the inmates established a culture of violence. Inmates in the Security Housing Unit were beaten, tied and left naked, or subjected to staged "gladiator fights" by guards who would intentionally release two prisoners from enemy gangs and then shoot at the prisoners after they began fighting.

Vaughn Dortch, who was serving a ten-year sentence for grand theft and whose mental illness had worsened since being moved to the SHU, was taken in April 1992 to be bathed by guards after smearing himself with feces. Five or six guards subjected Dortch to a bath in scalding water while he was handcuffed, leaving him with second- and third-degree burns. Prisoners were regularly housed two to a cell in the SHU due to overcrowding, with 364 prisoners double-bunked in 1990 and approximately 1,000 double-bunked by 1995, leading to serious injuries from cell fights.

Media attention, including a September 1993 60 Minutes report about the brutality against Dortch, and lawsuits ultimately led to changes at Pelican Bay State Prison. Federal District Court Judge Thelton Henderson ruled in the 1995 Madrid v. Gomez decision that the facility was not being ruled in a constitutional way, and ordered oversight by prisoner's rights lawyers and other experts. Henderson's ruling specifically demanded changes to the use of excessive force by guards, inadequate medical and mental healthcare, and the practice of housing mentally ill prisoners in the SHU.

=== Hunger strikes ===
Prisoners at PBSP, particularly those in isolation for several years, have organized or joined in hunger strikes in protest of conditions at the prison and the practice of subjecting prisoners to long periods of isolation.

In 2002, a reported 60 SHU inmates began a hunger strike.The prisoners called attention to the effects of isolation in the secure housing unit.

On July 1, 2011, several thousand prisoners at Pelican Bay State Prison joined a total of more than 6,000 prisoners elsewhere in California prisons to stage a hunger strike in protest against overly restrictive conditions and extended periods of isolation. They demanded warm clothes and a handball for use during their one-hour a day in the outdoor exercise yard, the ability to make one phone call per week, adequate food, and the possibility of reconsideration of their long periods of isolation after several years. The original strike lasted for over two weeks, and was repeated again in October of the same year.

Inmates resumed the July 2011 hunger strike two years later, on July 8, 2013, alleging a failure to uphold promises on the part of the California Department of Corrections and Rehabilitation (CDCR), with upwards of 29,000 prisoners across California joining in the hunger strike. Strikers demanded reform of "cruel" policies used to identify and subsequently isolate or punish alleged gang members, including lengthy solitary confinement and the quality of living improvements.

The strike lasted for two months, and dozens of prisoners were hospitalized. The strike brought the first widespread media attention to the Security Housing Units in California, the scale at which prisoners were being kept in such conditions, and the fact that there were prisoners who had been kept in solitary confinement at Pelican Bay for twenty years.

On the seventh week of the strike, Judge Thelton Henderson signed an order to permit the "re-feeding" of prisoners who were participating, though it was not clear precisely what was permitted by the order. This was made unnecessary shortly after when Senator Loni Hancock and Assembly member Tom Ammiano promised to investigate the state's policies around solitary confinement and consider legislation. Following this promise, the prisoners agreed to end the strike.

=== Lawsuit and termination of unlimited isolation policy ===
In May 2012, California's prison system faced a lawsuit from the Center for Constitutional Rights, Legal Services for inmates with Children, and other California attorneys on behalf of ten men incarcerated in the SHU. The plaintiffs were all housed in the SHU for 11 to 22 years, some having been transferred directly from other SHUs. The suit claims that the inmates "have been incarcerated California’s Pelican Bay State Prison's Security Housing Unit ("SHU") for an unconscionably long period of time without meaningful review of their placement", that "California's uniquely harsh regime of prolonged solitary confinement at Pelican Bay is inhumane and debilitating", and that "[t]he solitary confinement regime at Pelican Bay violates the United States Constitution's requirement of due process and prohibition of cruel and unusual punishment".

In August 2015, as a result of the aforementioned class-action lawsuit, California agreed to end its unlimited isolation policy. Inmates are no longer isolated as a preventive measure; only those who commit new crimes while incarcerated are eligible for up to five years of isolation.

== Notable inmates ==
- Roy Norris: One half of the Toolbox Killers, spent some time at PBSP in the late 90s.
- Cary Stayner: The Yosemite Park Killer sentenced to death for four counts of murder. Transferred from San Quentin to PBSP due to California's moratorium on the death penalty.
- Curtis Carroll: Murderer and financial advisor.
- Hugo Pinell: One of six inmates infamous for their 1971 escape attempt from San Quentin State Prison that left six people dead. Spent 43 years in long-term confinement (23 of those years were spent in the SHU) - longer than any other inmate in California. Was stabbed to death during a riot at California State Prison, Sacramento, just two weeks after being released from the SHU into the general population.
- Joe "Pegleg" Morgan: First non-Hispanic Mexican Mafia member, sentenced to life in prison for murder in 1956. Morgan was housed in the SHU until his transfer to the hospital ward of Corcoran State Prison, where he died from liver cancer in November 1993.
- Sanyika Shakur: Former Crips member and author of Monster: The Autobiography of an L.A. Gang Member, sentenced to five years in the SHU for assault and grand theft auto in January 1991. Was imprisoned again for six years for parole violation in May 2008 but paroled in August 2012.
- Rene Enriquez: Former member of the Mexican Mafia, sentenced to life imprisonment in 1991 for two separate murders. In 1993, he was sent to the SHU, but is now doing his time in protective custody at Ironwood State Prison after becoming a government informant.
- Damian Williams: Gained notoriety for attacking Reginald Denny and others during the 1992 Los Angeles riots. Sentenced to 10 years for assault, but released early for good behavior. Williams was sentenced to 46-years-to-life for killing a drug dealer in 2003. Currently incarcerated at Centinela State Prison.
- Mark William Cunningham: Serial killer who murdered three men in 1983.
- Lloyd Avery II: Actor most famous for his role in Boyz n the Hood, sentenced in 2005 to life imprisonment for double homicide. In September 2005, he was beaten and strangled to death by cellmate Kevin Roby; controversy ensued when it was revealed that his corpse allegedly was not discovered for another two days.
- Marion "Suge" Knight: Record producer sentenced to nine years for parole violation in 1996 and released in 2001. Sentenced to 10 months in 2003 for assault and parole violation. In 2018 Knight was sentenced to 28 years in prison and will not be eligible for parole until October 2034.
- Charles Manson: Infamous cult leader, sentenced to life imprisonment on seven counts of murder and one count of attempted murder. In March 1997, he was charged with conspiracy to distribute narcotics and transferred from CSP Corcoran to the Pelican Bay SHU for 14 months before being moved back to CSP Corcoran in May 1998; died at Mercy Hospital in Bakersfield, California, in 2017.
- Ricardo Medina Jr.: Actor famous for starring in Power Rangers Wild Force, sentenced to six years in prison for voluntary manslaughter for stabbing his roommate with a sword.
- Donny Johnson: murderer and painter.

== In popular culture ==
=== Television and film ===
In the fictional series Life, Detective Charlie Crews spends twelve years in Pelican Bay for a triple homicide he did not commit, part of it spent in the SHU, as the background of the series' plot.

In the TV series The Shield, the main character Vic Mackey regularly threatens recalcitrant suspects with only the name of the prison.

Alonzo Harris (Denzel Washington) threatens gang members with a sentence in Pelican Bay and the SHU program in the movie Training Day (2001).

Waingro (Kevin Gage) explains to a bartender he was in the SHU at Pelican Bay, B-wing, to get work in the movie Heat (1995).

=== Literature ===
In the novel The Lincoln Lawyer (2005), defense attorney Mickey Haller suggests to his client that he will serve his sentence in Pelican Bay due to his dishonesty and noncooperation.

== See also ==
- List of California state prisons
