= East Bakersfield High School =

Public high school in California, United States

Location
- 2220 Quincy Street; Bakersfield, California 93305; United States

Information
- School type: Public
- Opened: 1938; 88 years ago
- School district: Kern High School District
- Principal: Carla Stallworth
- Teaching staff: 99.48 (FTE)
- Grades: 9 to 12
- Enrollment: 2,420 (2023-2024)
- Student to teacher ratio: 24.33
- Colors: Red and Navy Blue
- Athletics conference: South Yosemite Mountain League
- Rival: West High School, Foothill High School, Highland High School
- Yearbook: Sierran
- Website: http://east.kernhigh.org/

East Bakersfield High School is a 9-12 high school located in Bakersfield, CA.

Built in 1938, EBHS, commonly called "East High", "East" or, less frequently, "EB", is the second oldest high school in Bakersfield after Bakersfield High School.

== Athletics ==
EBHS sports teams are called the Blades, and have their home games on campus. The Blades participate in the South Yosemite Mountain League CIF Central Section and have Varsity, JV and Frosh/Soph teams. Below are all the sports that EBHS participates in and their respective seasons:

Fall

- Football
- Cross Country
- Women's Golf
- Women's Tennis
- Women's Volleyball
- Cheerleading

Winter

- Men's Basketball
- Men's Soccer
- Women's Basketball
- Women's Soccer
- Wrestling
- Cheerleading

Spring

- Baseball
- Men's Golf
- Men's Tennis
- Softball
- Swimming
- Track & Field
- Cheerleading

== Notable alumni ==
- Robert Beltran: Actor
- Fred Boyd: Professional basketball player, fifth overall pick of 1972 NBA draft
- Rodolfo Cadena: Key member in the Mexican Mafia.
- Louie Cruz Beltran: Musician
- Johnny Callison: All Star MLB player
- Keith Carpenter: former CFL player
- Jeanne Cooper: American actress
- Billy Cowan: MLB player, college basketball player University of Utah
- Dave DeRoo: American rock musician and bassist of the band Adema
- J. R. Sakuragi: American-Japanese professional basketball player
- Rick Sawyer: MLB player
- James Shaffer: guitarist and founding member of the nu metal band Korn
- Mary K. Shell: First female Mayor of Bakersfield.
- Brian Welch: singer, songwriter, guitarist, and founding member of the nu metal band Korn
