= American Me =

1992 film directed by Edward James Olmos

- Theatrical release poster
- Directed by: Edward James Olmos
- Screenplay by: Floyd Mutrux; Desmond Nakano
- Story by: Floyd Mutrux
- Produced by: Edward James Olmos; Robert M. Young; Sean Daniel
- Starring: Edward James Olmos; William Forsythe; Pepe Serna; Evelina Fernández
- Cinematography: Reynaldo Villalobos
- Edited by: Richard Candib; Arthur Coburn
- Music by: Claude Gaudette; Dennis Lambert
- Production companies: YOY Productions; Olmos Productions; The Sean Daniel Company
- Distributed by: Universal Pictures
- Release date: March 13, 1992
- Running time: 126 minutes
- Country: United States
- Languages: English; Spanish
- Budget: $16 million
- Box office: $13 million

American Me is a 1992 American crime drama film produced and directed by Edward James Olmos, in his directorial debut, from a screenplay by Floyd Mutrux and Desmond Nakano. Olmos stars as Montoya Santana, who is loosely based on Mexican Mafia boss Rodolfo Cadena. Executive producers included record producer Lou Adler, screenwriter Mutrux, and Irwin Young. The film is a fictionalized account of the founding and rise to power of the Mexican Mafia in the California prison system from the 1950s into the 1980s. The film received positive reviews from critics but was a box office failure.

In 2024, the film was selected for preservation in the United States National Film Registry by the Library of Congress as being "culturally, historically, or aesthetically significant".

== Plot ==
The film spans 30 years of Chicano gang life in Los Angeles. The story opens with the Zoot Suit Riots of 1943 and depicts a young Latino couple, Esperanza and Pedro Santana, being racially targeted by sailors. Pedro is beaten alongside other Latin-Americans, while Esperanza is gang-raped by the sailors. Years later, in 1959, the Santana family's teenaged son, Montoya, forms a street gang called La Primera along with his friends J.D. and Mundo. The three friends soon find themselves committing crimes and are therefore arrested.

In juvenile hall, Santana murders a fellow inmate who raped him. As a result, his sentence is extended, and he is moved to Folsom State Prison after he turns 18.

Years later, Santana has become the leader of a powerful prison gang, La Eme. Upon his release from prison in 1977, he tries to relate his life experiences to the society that has changed so much since he was incarcerated. La Eme has become a feared criminal organization beyond Folsom, selling drugs and committing murder. Santana begins a romantic relationship with a woman named Julie, but she becomes repulsed by his violent tendencies and by La Eme's negative influence on their community.

After a drug lord refuses to give control of distribution to La Eme, La Eme retaliates by brutally raping and murdering the drug lord's son in prison. In response, the drug lord targets Santana's community by distributing pure heroin to local users. The pure heroin causes mass overdoses, and one of the overdose victims is Julie's brother. Santana visits his mother's grave, where his father reveals that he always resented Montoya because he might have been the son of one his mother's rapists.

Santana starts to see the error of his ways. Before he can take action, however, he is sent back to Folsom for drug possession. When J.D. visits, Santana tells him that he is no longer interested in leading La Eme. However, following a precedent set by Santana himself earlier in the film, his men—including Mundo—murder him to show the other prison gangs that La Eme is not weak and will not tolerate departures from its ranks. Santana is fatally stabbed and thrown off a balcony to his death.

Julie receives a letter from Santana thanking her for opening his eyes. The letter contains his necklace of St. Dismas. Julie gives the necklace to Santana's teen brother Paulito, who then inducts a young boy into the street gang, La Primera by having him commit a drive-by shooting.

== Cast ==
- Edward James Olmos as Montoya Santana, based on Rudy "Cheyenne" Cadena, a notorious La Eme mob boss. Cheyenne died in 1972 after being stabbed and bludgeoned to death by members of the Mexican Mafia's long-standing bitter rival, the Nuestra Familia.
  - Panchito Gomez as young Montoya Santana
- William Forsythe as J.D, based on Joe "Pegleg" Morgan. Joseph Morgan was a Croatian-American man who became a member of the Mexican Mafia in 1968 while doing time in San Quentin State prison, despite his lack of Mexican or other Latino heritage. He died in prison in 1993 from inoperable liver cancer.
  - Steve Wilcox as young J.D.
- Pepe Serna as "Mundo", based on Ramon "Mundo" Mendoza. According to 'Mundo', he was not a founding member of La Eme and he didn't become a member shortly after his arrival to San Quentin State prison in 1968. He stated that he had not murdered 'Cheyenne' Cadena, after he saw the film's depiction.
  - Richard Coca as young "Mundo"
- Daniel A. Haro as "Huero". Based on Luis "Huero Buff" Flores, who was the founder of the Mexican Mafia while doing time for murder in 1957 at the Deuel Vocational Institution.
- Sal Lopez as Pedro Santana
- Vira Montes as Esperanza Santana
- Danny De La Paz as "Puppet"
- Daniel Villarreal as "Little Puppet"
- Evelina Fernández as Julie
- Roberto Martín Márquez as Acha
- Dyana Ortelli as Yolanda
- Jacob Vargas as Paulito Santana
- Eric Close as Juvie Hall Attacker
- Rigoberto Jimenez as "Big Happy"
- Cary-Hiroyuki Tagawa as "El Japo" based on Mike "Jap Mike" Kudo.
- Robby Robinson as Drug Thief
- Ron Thompson as Junkie
- Rafael H. Robledo as "El Chucko" Pena
- William Smith as Deacon

== Production ==
Parts of the film were shot in Folsom State Prison and California Institution for Men. Shooting lasted for three weeks and included 800 inmates and guards, who appeared as extras. Scenes shot in Los Angeles included gang members as extras.

Edward James Olmos originally offered Danny Trejo the role of Pedro Santana. Trejo was unimpressed by the script and his initial meeting with Olmos. Trejo claims rumors began circulating within the Mexican Mafia that the script was taking narrative liberties. Before Trejo had the chance to attend a second meeting with Olmos, he received a call from Joe "Pegleg" Morgan, the then-don of the Mexican Mafia; Morgan approved of his choosing a role in Blood In, Blood Out instead of American Me. In 2021, Trejo stated that he believes Olmos has yet to accept him as a serious actor.

== Reception ==
=== Box office ===
The film opened in wide release in the United States on March 13, 1992 (830 screens). The opening weekend's gross was $3.4 million, and the total receipts for the first three weeks were $9.1 million. The film was in wide release for three weeks (seventeen days). In its widest release the film was featured in 830 theaters across the country. The final box office gross amounted to $13.1 million.

=== Critical response ===
Roger Ebert of the Chicago Sun-Times liked the reality that came through in the film and that it rang true: "What I felt watching American Me, however, is that it is based on a true situation—on the reality that street gangs and prison, mixed with the drug sales that finance the process, work together to create a professional criminal class."

Janet Maslin writes in The New York Times, "But Mr. Olmos's direction...is dark, slow and solemn, so much so that it diverts energy from the film's fundamental frankness. Violent as it is, American Me is seldom dramatic enough to bring its material to life."

Marjorie Baumgarten, a film critic for The Austin Chronicle, wrote, "American Me is crafted with heart and conviction and intelligence. It demands no less of its audience. It insists that there are no quick fixes, but that solutions are of the utmost urgency."

The film was screened in the Un Certain Regard section at the 1992 Cannes Film Festival.

On Rotten Tomatoes, the film has an approval rating of 73% based on 11 reviews, with an average rating of 6.7/10. On Metacritic, the film has a score of 66% based on reviews from 11 critics, indicating "generally favorable" reviews.

== Soundtrack ==
Since the film deals with a Latino subculture, the music included in the soundtrack was Latino oriented—late 1970s urban sounds and oldies from the 1950s.

The original soundtrack was released on April 28, 1992, by Virgin Records.

The CD contains ten tracks and includes songs performed by various artists including: Los Lobos, Santana, Ike & Tina Turner, Bobby Day, Kid Frost, War, and other performers.

== Mexican Mafia reaction ==
Segments of the Mexican Mafia were enraged by the film, specifically the lead character's rape as a juvenile and his death at the hands of his own followers at the end of his criminal career. Whether as retaliation over their depiction in the film, or as a routine criminal racket, Mexican Mafia member Joe "Pegleg" Morgan, who served as the inspiration for the character of J.D., allegedly attempted to extort money from Olmos. Court documents show that Olmos was a victim in one extortion count contained in a 33-count federal indictment. According to reportage by CBS News weekly 60 Minutes, three consultants on this film were later murdered because of the depiction of a homosexual rape scene which offended the Mexican Mafia gangsters' machismo.

Actor Danny Trejo said in an interview that he was aware of 10 people having been murdered for their involvement with the film. The first killing occurred 12 days after the film's premiere when one of the film's consultants, Charles "Charlie Brown" Manriquez, a member of La Eme, was killed in Ramona Gardens, L.A.'s oldest public housing project.

Another consultant to the film, 49-year-old grandmother Ana Lizarraga, commonly known as "The Gang Lady", was murdered when she was gunned down in her East Los Angeles driveway while loading luggage into her car the day of her mother's funeral. A federal indictment accused La Eme of ordering the 1992 murder of Lizarraga. Lizarraga was a former gang member who was, by the time she was killed, an anti-gang counselor. She played a grandmother in the film. Her murder occurred eight months after American Me was completed.
