= Robert Beltran =

American actor (born 1953)

- Beltran in 2013
- Born: Robert Adame Beltran; November 19, 1953 (age 72); Bakersfield, California, U.S.
- Education: Bakersfield College (attended); California State University, Fresno (BA)
- Occupation: Actor
- Years active: 1981–present
- Children: 1
- Relatives: Louie Cruz Beltran (brother)

Robert Adame Beltran (born November 19, 1953) is an American actor known for his role as Commander Chakotay on the 1990s television series Star Trek: Voyager. He is also known for stage acting in California, and for playing Raoul Mendoza in the 1982 black comedy film Eating Raoul.

== Early life ==
Beltran was born in Bakersfield, California, the son of Aurelia and Luis Beltran Perez, immigrants from Mexico. He attended East Bakersfield High School and Bakersfield College. He has two sisters and seven brothers, including Latin Jazz musician Louie Cruz Beltran.

== Career ==
Beltran graduated from California State University, Fresno with a degree in Theater Arts and moved to Los Angeles to begin his acting career. He had his first film role in Zoot Suit in 1981, but his breakthrough came in 1982 when he played the title character in the independently produced dark comedy Eating Raoul. Beltran had a supporting role as Chuck Norris' partner Trooper Kayo Ramos in the 1983 film Lone Wolf McQuade. He then starred in the 1984 TV film The Mystic Warrior as Native American brave Ahbleza, and as Hector in 1984's Night of the Comet. He played Father Michael in a 1993 episode of Murder She Wrote (S9, E12). He played Commander Chakotay, the Native American first officer of the starship Voyager, in the science-fiction television series Star Trek: Voyager from 1995 to 2001. During this time, he won the Nosotros Golden Eagle Award for Outstanding Actor in a Television Series in 1997. He was also nominated in 1996 for the NCLR Bravo Award for Outstanding Television Series Actor in a Crossover Role, and the ALMA Award for Outstanding Individual Performance in a Television Series in a Crossover Role in 1998 and 1999.

Beltran founded and co-directed the East LA Classic Theater Group. He is also a member of the Classical Theater Lab, an ensemble of professional actors who co-produced his production of Hamlet in 1997, which he directed and starred in.

Beltran has collaborated with amateur actors in performing plays and scenes of plays of William Shakespeare. He produced and starred in a Los Angeles production of The Big Knife by Clifford Odets, a play which explores the Hollywood environment under the big studio system of the 1940s.

In May 2009, Beltran played the dual roles of Don Fermin and Older Eusebio in the American Conservatory Theater's staging of José Rivera's Boleros for the Disenchanted. He had the recurring role of Jerry Flute in Seasons 3 and 4 of HBO's Big Love.

== Recordings ==
Latino Poetry – Excerpts from a live performance by Beltran, recorded at the Museum of Latin American Art in Long Beach, California, April 2002

== Filmography ==
=== Film ===
Year	Title	Role	Notes
1981	Zoot Suit	Lowrider	
1982	Eating Raoul	Raoul Mendoza	
1983	Lone Wolf McQuade	Deputy Arcadio "Kayo" Ramos	
1984	Night of the Comet	Hector Gomez	
1985	Latino	Eddie Guerrero	
1987	Slam Dance	Frank	
1987	Gaby: A True Story	Luis	
1988	The Bulldance	Jack	
1989	Scenes from the Class Struggle in Beverly Hills	Juan	
1991	Kiss Me a Killer	Tony Montero	
1991	To Die Standing	Juan Delgado	
1991	Bugsy	Alejandro	
1995	500 Nations		
1995	Nixon	Frank Sturgis	
1997	Managua	Ramon	
1997	Trekkies	Himself	Documentary
1997	How Else Am I Supposed to Know I'm Still Alive		
1999	Luminarias	Joe	
2000	Fahrenheit 452: The Art Police		Short
2002	Foto-Novelas		
2009	Repo Chick	Aguas	
2009	Taking Chances	Joseph Sleeping Bear	
2013	Water & Power		
2013	Free Birds	Chief Massasoit (voice)	
2018	Magic Lantern	Ed	
2019	The Circuit		
2020	Butterflies	James	Short

=== Television ===
Year	Title	Role	Notes
1984	Calendar Girl Murders	Mooney	Television film
1984	The Mystic Warrior		Television film
1985	Street Hawk	Marty Walsh	1.5-hour pilot
1986	The Family Martinez	Hector Martinez	Television film
1987	CBS Summer Playhouse	Howard Thunder	Episode: "Barrington"
1987	Private Eye	Miguel Brojas	Episode: "Barrio Nights"
1988	The Bronx Zoo	Mike	Episode: "A Day in the Life"
1989	Miami Vice	Amendez	Episode: "Freefall"
1990	Sisters	Mike Perez	Television film
1990	El Diablo	"El Diablo"	Television film
1990	Midnight Caller	Carlos Valenzuela	
1991	The Chase	Mike Silva	Television film
1991	Veronica Clare	Duke Rado	
1991	La Pastorela	Luzbel	
1992	Stormy Weathers	Gio	Television film
1993	Shadow Hunter	Frank Totsoni	Television film
1993	Rio Shannon	Tito Carson	Television film
1993–1994	Murder, She Wrote	Frank Garcia / Father Michael	
1994	Lois & Clark	Fuentes / Murphy	
1994	Models, Inc.	Lieutenant Louis Soto	
1994	State of Emergency	Raoul Hernandez	Television film
1995	Runway One	Ramon Perez	Television film
1995–2001	Star Trek: Voyager	Commander Chakotay	Main cast; 172 episodes
1999	Ultimate Trek: Star Trek's Greatest Moments	Chakotay (archive footage)	
2001	2001 ALMA Awards	Himself - Presenter	TV special
2003	CSI: Miami	Judge Ojeda	Episode: "Tinder Box"
2005	Manticore	Sergeant Baxter	Television film
2007	Fire Serpent	Cooke	Television film
2007	Medium	Father Armando Avilar	Episode: "Whatever Possessed You"
2007	Cry of the Winged Serpent	Father Juan	Television film
2009–2011	Big Love	Jerry Flute	
2012	Young Justice	Maurice Bodaway (voice)	Episode: "Beneath"
2022	Star Trek: Prodigy	Captain Chakotay (voice)	Recurring role; 7 episodes

=== Theatre ===
Year	Title	Role	Director	Writer	Theatre	Notes
1979	California Shakespeare Festival	Unknown	Unknown	Unknown	Unknown	
1980	Bard in the Box Tour	Unknown	Unknown	Unknown	Unknown	
1980	La Pastorela	Luzbel	Unknown	Unknown	El Teatro Campesino	
1981	A Midsummer Night's Dream	Oberon	Unknown	William Shakespeare	California Shakespeare Festival	
1981	Henry IV, Part 1 & Henry IV, Part 2	Unknown	Unknown	William Shakespeare	California Shakespeare Festival	
1981	Hamlet	Hamlet	Robert Beltran and Kris Tabori	William Shakespeare	The Actors' Gang	
1981	Romeo and Juliet	Unknown	Unknown	Unknown	Unknown	
1981	The Taming of the Shrew	Petraccio	Unknown	Unknown	Unknown	
1983	Corridos	Unknown	Unknown	Unknown	El Teatro Campesino	
1985	The Quartered Man	Agent	Mark Travis	Donald Freed	Los Angeles Theatre Center	
1986	I Don't Have to Show You No Stinkin' Badges	Sunny	Tony Curiel	Luis Valdez	San Diego Repertory Theatre	
1987	Stars in the Morning Sky	Unknown	Bill Bushnell	Alexander Galin	Los Angeles Theatre Center	
1988	A Burning Beach	Cuba	Bill Bushnell and Jose Luis Valenzuela	Eduardo Machado	Los Angeles Theatre Center	
1989	Macbeth	Banquo	Des McAnuff	William Shakespeare	Mandell Weiss Center	
1991	Windows	The Lieutenant	Robert Egan	Ariel Dorfman and Tony Kushner	Los Angeles Theatre Center	
1993	A Touch of the Poet	Cornelius	Rubén Sierra	Eugene O'Neill	Cal State L.A.	
1997	Hamlet	Hamlet	Robert Beltran	William Shakespeare	The Actors' Gang	
2003	The Big Knife	Charlie Castle	Tonyo Melendez	Clifford Odets	Lillian Theatre	
2009	Henry IV, Part 1 & Henry IV, Part 2	Unknown	Unknown	William Shakespeare	Unknown	
2009	Boleros for the Disenchanted	Don Fermin/Eusebio	Carey Perloff	José Rivera	American Conservatory Theater	
2009	Solitude	The Man	Jose Luis Valenzuela	Evelina Fernandez	Los Angeles Theatre Center	
2011	Devil's Advocate	General Noriega	Jose Luis Valenzuela	Donald Freed	Los Angeles Theatre Center	

=== Video games ===
Year	Title	Role	Notes
2000	Star Trek: Voyager – Elite Force	Commander Chakotay	

== Awards and nominations ==
Year	Association	Category	Nominated work	Result
1996	NCLR Bravo Award	Outstanding Television Series Actor in a Crossover Role	Star Trek: Voyager	Nominated
1997	Nosotros Golden Eagle Award	Outstanding Actor in a Television Series	Star Trek: Voyager	Won
1998	ALMA Award	Outstanding Individual Performance in a Television Series in a Crossover Role	Star Trek: Voyager	Nominated
1999	ALMA Award	Outstanding Individual Performance in a Television Series in a Crossover Role	Star Trek: Voyager	Nominated
