= Deuel Vocational Institution =

State prison in San Joaquin County, California

Deuel Vocational Institution (DVI)
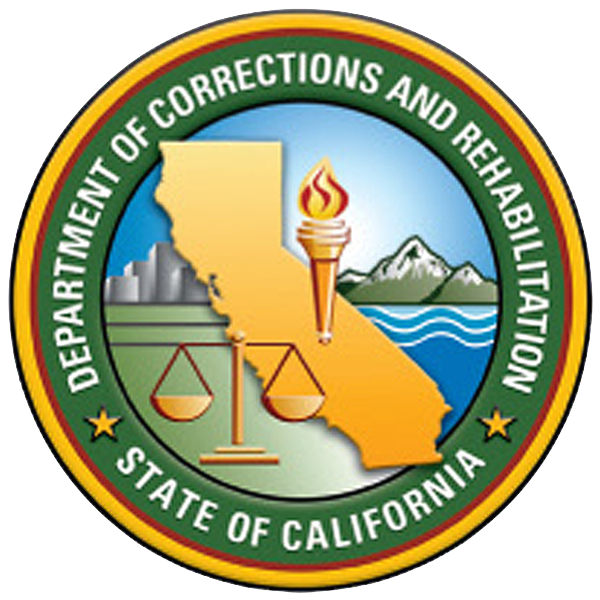
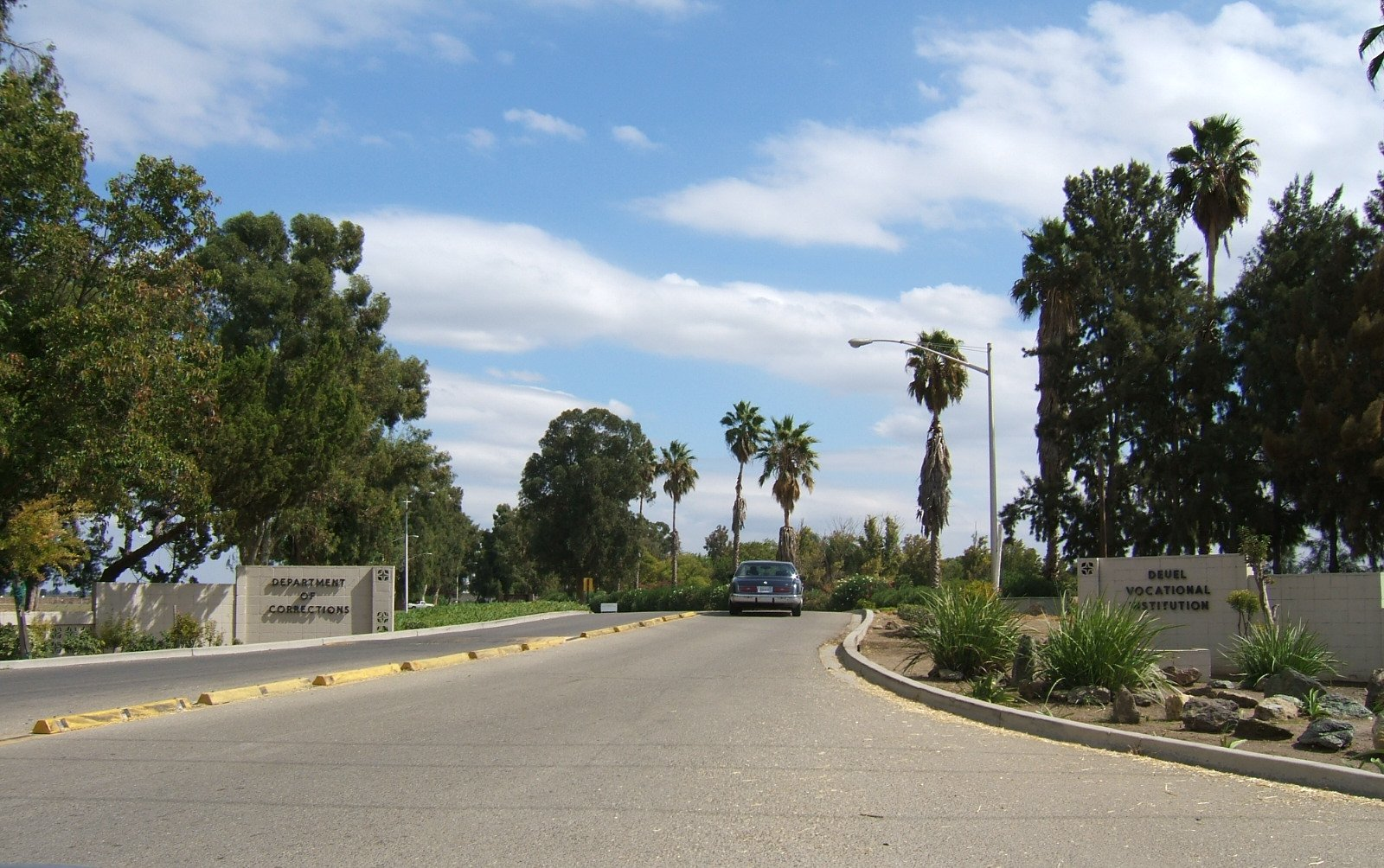
- Interactive map of Deuel Vocational Institution (DVI)
- Location: San Joaquin County, California; 37.7479°N 121.3302°W
- Status: Closed
- Capacity: 1,681
- Population: 2,047 (121.8% capacity) (April 30, 2020)
- Opened: 1953
- Closed: 2021
- Managed by: California Department of Corrections and Rehabilitation

Deuel Vocational Institution (DVI) was a state prison located in unincorporated San Joaquin County, California, near Tracy. The prison closed on September 30, 2021.

== Facilities ==
Location of Tracy within San Joaquin County and San Joaquin County within California

DVI opened in 1953 and named for California state senator Charles H. Deuel, who sponsored legislation establishing the institution. The facility has been expanded and reorganized several times, in 1959, 1981 and 1993.

As of April 30, 2020, DVI was incarcerating people at 121.8% of its design capacity, with 2,047 occupants.

In 1956 the Mexican Mafia was established at Deuel.

One purpose of DVI was to serve as a reception center for newly committed prisoners to the California Department of Corrections and Rehabilitation from northern California county jails. The facility also housed "mainline" inmates classified by CDCR as levels II and III. There was also a minimum security "ranch" that supports a dairy. As of January 2006, the total count of prisoners at DVI was 3,748, with 3,162 of that number assigned to the reception center.

As recently as June 2010, an inmate murder in the facility has been recorded.

DVI also had a 110-inmate farm and operate a 1200-cow dairy. They grew cattle grain and supply milk to other state prisons and tax-supported public agencies.

== Notable inmates ==
- Rodney Alcala- Serial killer known as the Dating Game Killer. Convicted in 1971 for child molestation, spent time here before being transferred to CMF. Paroled in August 3rd 1974.
- Bobby Beausoleil (born 1947), Manson family member; musician, recorded Lucifer Rising while incarcerated at Deuel.
- Rodolfo Cadena (1943-1972), mob boss; later stabbed to death in another prison
- Diego Corrales (1977-2007), boxer; served 14 months for assault
- Fleeta Drumgo (1945-1979), member of the San Quentin Six; served time for attempted murder
- Rene "Boxer" Enriquez (born 1962), gang member; later sent to Pelican Bay State Prison in 1993
- Joe Fong (born 1954/5), former gang member; released in 1979
- Gerald Gallego Serial killer, spent one year here for auto theft.
- Glen Stewart Godwin (born 1958), murderer; later transferred to Folsom State Prison
- Clem Grogan (born 1951), Manson family member
- Gary Steven Krist, most notable for the Barbara Mackle kidnapping in 1968, briefly escaped from DVI in 1966
- Chol Soo Lee (1952-2014), immigrant wrongfully convicted of murder; later transferred to San Quentin State Penitentiary for killing an inmate; acquitted in 1983
- Robert Maxfield (born c.1978), convicted for the murder of Yetunde Price; served 12 years before being released on parole
- George U. Powell (1933-2012), murderer; died at California Medical Facility
- Craig V. Smith (1945-2012), musician; sentenced for trying to kill his mother; served time in several prisons, including DVI; paroled in 1976
- Raymond Washington (1953-1979), gangster and Crips gang founder; served 5 years for robbery
- Melvin Yu, one of the perpetrators of the Golden Dragon massacre; released from Solano State Prison in 2015

== See also ==
- List of California state prisons
