= Don Carpenter =

American novelist

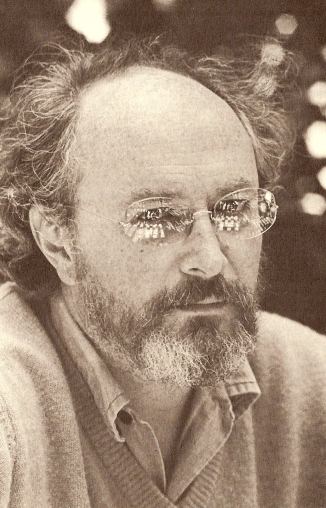
Don Carpenter

Don Carpenter (March 16, 1931 – July 27, 1995) was an American writer, best known as the author of Hard Rain Falling. He wrote numerous novels, novellas, short stories and screenplays over the course of a 22-year career that took him from a childhood in Berkeley, California and the Pacific Northwest to Hollywood. A close observer of human frailty, his writing depicted marginal characters like pool sharks, prisoners, and drug dealers, as well as movie moguls and struggling actors.

Although lauded by critics and fellow writers, Carpenter's novels and stories never reached a mass audience, and he supported himself with extensive work for Hollywood.

== History ==
Don Carpenter was born in Berkeley, California, and lived in Lafayette during the early years of his childhood. He attended and graduated from Berkeley High School. In 1951, Carpenter enlisted in the U.S. Air Force and was stationed in Kyoto, Japan. During his time in the service, Carpenter was a writer for the military newspaper Stars and Stripes, where he met musician and cartoonist Shel Silverstein.

When Carpenter was discharged from service in 1955 he returned to Portland, where he married Martha Ryherd. They had two daughters, Bonnie and Leha, and settled in San Francisco in the late 1950s. In 1957, Carpenter enrolled in San Francisco State College and received an M.A. when he graduated in 1961. Four years later (1965), the Carpenters settled in Mill Valley, California. Carpenter taught English for two years before publishing his first novel Hard Rain Falling (1966).

From the late 1960s to the early 1980s Carpenter lived in and out of Hollywood writing screenplays for movies. Carpenter wrote a screenplay for the film Payday which was filmed in 1972 and starred Rip Torn as a country singer. He also wrote a teleplay for an episode of the 1960s television series The High Chaparral called "Once on a Day in Spring". He also wrote three Hollywood novels between 1975 and 1981.

One of the most troubling chapters to occur in Carpenter's life was in 1984, when his best friend Richard Brautigan committed suicide. In the late 1980s, Carpenter suffered from several medical maladies including tuberculosis, diabetes, and glaucoma. As the years went on, Carpenter's illnesses got progressively worse. After many years of suffering, Carpenter died of a self-inflicted gunshot wound in the summer of 1995 at his home in Mill Valley, California. He was 64. At the time of his death, Carpenter was working on a novel called Fridays at Enrico's, which was finished by Jonathan Lethem and published in 2014 by Counterpoint Press. The Hollywood Trilogy, an omnibus of his three Hollywood novels, was published by Counterpoint later that same year.

Don Carpenter's first novel, Hard Rain Falling, was reissued by New York Review Books as part of its Classics series, with an introduction by George Pelecanos.

In The 1,911 Best Things Anybody Ever Said by Robert Byrne, Don Carpenter is credited with the line, "'Hello,' he lied." The line was later used in two Hollywood memoir titles: "Hello, He Lied & Other Tales from the Hollywood Trenches" by Linda Obst (1997) and "'Hello', Lied the Agent: And Other Bullshit You Hear as a Hollywood TV Writer" by Ian Gurvitz (2006).

Carpenter described himself as an atheist.

== Death ==
Carpenter died on July 27, 1995, in his "tiny cluttered apartment in Mill Valley, California". The cause of death was suicide.

== Works ==
- Hard Rain Falling (1966, novel)
- Blade of Light (1967, novel)
- The Murder of the Frogs and Other Stories (1969, short stories)
- Getting Off (1971, novel)
- Payday (1972, screenplay)
- The True Life Story of Jody McKeegan (1975, novel)
- Charles Bukowski's Post Office (1977, screenplay)
- A Couple of Comedians (1979, novel)
- Turnaround (1981, novel)
- The Class of '49 (1985, novel and three stories)
- The Dispossessed (1986, novel)
- From A Distant Place (1988, novel)
- Fridays at Enrico's (1993–1994, published 2014)
