= Donny Johnson =

American painter and murderer

Donald Clayton "Donny" Johnson (born 1960) is an American painter and convicted murderer. He is known for his unconventional technique, which involves using a brush made of his own hair and pigment from M&M's candy shells dissolved in water. The New York Times described his style as abstract; Spiegel Online mentioned that his art varies from colorful to dark.

Johnson grew up in a family of abusers and criminals, ran away from home at 10, and spent time repeatedly in juvenile detention. He has been in prison since 1980 after pleading guilty to second-degree murder and being sentenced to 15 years to life. In the late 1980s, he cut a prison guard's throat and assaulted another, and was convicted for both and sentenced to two additional terms of nine years to life. In 2007, he was reported to be incarcerated at the secure housing unit of California's Pelican Bay State Prison, where he had been since 1989. The Secure Housing Unit, the highest-security unit at Pelican Bay, did not offer any art supplies, so Johnson created a paintbrush using hair, plastic wrap, and ballpoint pen refill, and created paint from M&M's candy coatings.

Johnson is not allowed to profit from his artwork. In 2006, he stated that he intended the money to go to the Pelican Bay Prison Project that helps the children of prisoners. After Johnson sent paintings to a friend, the friend organized an exhibition of work in Mexico. In July 2006 and August 2007, exhibitions of Johnson's paintings were held at the Yam Gallery in San Miguel de Allende, Mexico, with proceeds to go to the Pelican Prison Bay Project. On one night, six of his postcard pictures sold there for $500 a piece. Prison officials responded by confiscating his art supplies and prohibiting him from sending pictures out, as a punishment for "unauthorized business from inside prison", but eventually allowed him to send pictures out again.

On August 4, 2006, The New York Times reported that Johnson has been disciplined for engaging in unauthorized business, but this proved not to be the case and Johnson continues to produce and mail out his work to friends.

As of 2021, Johnson is serving his sentence at High Desert State Prison.

Mike Dibb created a documentary about Johnson’s life entitled Painted With My Hair; the film was released in 2021.
