= Wang Yangyuan =

Chinese physicist

- 王阳元
- Born: 1 January 1935 (age 91); Ningbo, Zhejiang, China
- Education: Peking University
- Spouse: Yang Fuqing
- Children: 2
- Scientific career
- Fields: Microelectronics
- Workplaces: Peking University

Chinese name
- Simplified Chinese: 王阳元
- Traditional Chinese: 王陽元
Transcriptions
Standard Mandarin
- Hanyu Pinyin: Wáng Yángyuán

Wang Yangyuan (born 1 January 1935) is a Chinese physicist who is a professor at Peking University, a member of the Chinese Academy of Sciences, and currently dean of the university's Institute of Microelectronics and director of its Department of Microelectronics.

== Biography ==
Wang was born into a family of farming background in the town of Chaiqiao, Ningbo, Zhejiang, on 1 January 1935. He has seven siblings. He secondary studied at Ningbo High School. In 1953, he was admitted to Peking University, where he majored in the Department of Physics. He joined the Chinese Communist Party in 1956. After graduation, he taught there, where he served as director of the newly founded Microelectronics Laboratory in 1978. In 1975, Wang and his colleagues developed 1024 bit MOS dynamic-random access memory after eight years of research, making China become the third country after the United States and Japan. He was a senior visiting scholar at the University of California, Berkeley between 1982 and 1983. In 1986, Peking University organized the Institute of Microelectronics, Wang became its first dean. In 1986, the Chinese government established the National Key Laboratory of Micro/Nano Processing Technology in Beijing, Wang was made director. In 1986, he led 118 experts and scholars from 17 units in China to develop computer-aided design technology for IC, which was successful in 1993. Wang co-founded the Semiconductor Manufacturing International Corporation (SMIC) in 2000, which greatly helps the development of the semiconductor industry in China. In 2002, he became dean of Peking University's Institute of Microelectronics and director of its Department of Microelectronics.

== Personal life ==
Wang married his alumni Yang Fuqing, who is also a member of the Chinese Academy of Sciences. The couple has a son and a daughter.

== Honors and awards ==
- 1995 Member of the Chinese Academy of Sciences (CAS)
- 2000 Fellow of the Institution of Electrical Engineers (IEE Fellow)
- 2001 Fellow of the Institute of Electrical and Electronics Engineers (IEEE Fellow)
- 2003 Science and Technology Progress Award of the Ho Leung Ho Lee Foundation
- 2006 Cai Yuanpei Prize
- 2008 SEMI Prize
