= Payday (1973 film) =

1973 American drama film

- Theatrical release poster
- Directed by: Daryl Duke
- Written by: Don Carpenter
- Produced by: Don Carpenter; Martin Fink
- Starring: Rip Torn; Ahna Capri; Michael C. Gwynne; Jeff Morris; Cliff Emmich
- Cinematography: Richard C. Glouner
- Edited by: Richard Halsey
- Music by: Ed Bogas; Tommy McKinney; Shel Silverstein; Ian Tyson; Sylvia Tyson
- Production companies: Fantasy Films; Fantasy Records; Pumice Finance Company
- Distributed by: Cinerama Releasing Corporation
- Release date: February 22, 1973 (New York City)
- Running time: 103 minutes
- Country: United States
- Budget: $760,000

Payday is a 1973 American drama film written by Don Carpenter, directed by Daryl Duke, and starring Rip Torn as a country music singer. Other members of the cast include Ahna Capri, Elayne Heilveil, and Michael C. Gwynne. The picture was filmed in and around Selma, Alabama.

== Plot ==
Maury Dann (Rip Torn) is a successful country-western singer who travels around the Southern states in a Cadillac and gets himself into all sorts of adventures.

The film opens with Dann performing in a small club with his band, entourage, and nagging girlfriend, Mayleen, in tow. He meets a young girl named Sandy backstage and seduces her in the back of his car while her boyfriend and boss, Mr. Bridgeway, is looking for her.

The band returns to a nearby motel, bringing along Rosamond, a young lady from the show. The next day, Maury visits his invalid mother and, along with a couple of the guys from the band, goes on a hunting trip. He gets into a fistfight with Bob Tally over Maury's dog Snapper, who is not being properly taken care of by Maury's sick mother. After the fight, Maury reluctantly gives Snapper away to Bob, but fires him from the band before returning to the motel.

During the trip, Maury seduces Rosamond in the back of the Cadillac, much to Mayleen's dismay. Later, while in the ladies' room, Mayleen warns Rosamond to stay away from Maury. The band stops by a local radio station to help promote Maury's new album, Payday, and to bribe a DJ with a gift of Wild Turkey liquor to keep playing more of Maury's records on-air.

During a heated exchange, Maury kicks Mayleen out of the car and leaves her stranded by the side of the road. Maury take a detour and goes to visit his ex-wife, Galen, to celebrate his son's birthday. They get into an argument as well and Maury leaves without seeing his son.

At a restaurant, Maury and company are confronted by a drunken Bridgeway, who claims that Maury had raped Sandy the day before. Maury and Bridgeway step outside to discuss the matter. Bridgeway pulls out a knife and tries to attack Maury, who quickly turns the knife around and stabs Bridgeway to death. To avoid a scandal and missing tour dates, Maury's tour manager McGinty arranges for his chauffeur, Chicago, to take the blame for Bridgeway's death.

With Chicago gone, Maury hires a young fan named Ted, an aspiring country singer, to be his new driver. Rosamond, feeling distraught over Bridgeway's death, tells Ted that she wants to go home but does not have any money. The local police and district attorney come to Maury's motel to bring him in for questioning over Bridgeway's death. He makes a dash for the Cadillac. With Ted in the back seat and Maury driving the car, Maury suffers a heart attack and dies behind the wheel.

The film ends with Ted, who survives the crash but is badly injured, running out of a wooded area looking for help.

== Cast ==
- Rip Torn as Maury Dann
- Ahna Capri as Mayleen Travis
- Elayne Heilveil as Rosamond McClintock
- Michael C. Gwynne as Clarence McGinty
- Jeff Morris as Bob Tally
- Cliff Emmich as Chicago
- Henry O. Arnold as Ted Blankenship
- Bobby Smith as Lyman Pitt
- Dallas Smith as Henry Tutweiler
- Richard Hoffman as Foggy Bottom Yonce
- Walter Bamberg as Bridgeway
- Eleanor Fell as Galen Dann
- Clara Dunn as Mama Dann
- Linda Spatz as Sandy
- Earle Trigg as Bob Dickey
- Winton McNair as Officer Ratliff
- Mike Edwards as Restaurant Manager
- Gene Cody as Motel Manager
- Frazier Moss as Jesse Weatherwax
- Bill Littleton as Process Server
- Phillip Wende as Billy Lee Blackstone
- Ed Neeley as Abe
- Sonny Shroyer as Dabney
- Cliff Hillerby as Club Manager

== Reception ==
Peter Schjeldahl of The New York Times called it "a brilliant, nasty little chrome-plated razor blade of a movie ... a 'road picture' that is not, for once, a sentimental odyssey, but rather a clear-eyed study of people whose lives are linked to the road, how they behave and what becomes of them. Its clarity is what makes it so extraordinary. It is a work of such dead-honest realism that it is hard to know how, except as a kind of literal truth, to take it." Arthur D. Murphy of Variety called it "a topnotch melodrama which explores incisively one of the dimmer aspects of the backstage pop music scene. Director Daryl Duke's feature debut is outstanding." Charles Champlin of the Los Angeles Times wrote, "While backstage dramas are nothing new and we have been shown the sneer behind the starry grin often enough, in 'A Face in the Crowd' and elsewhere, 'Payday' explores the Nashville-centered world of country with an easy authenticity which makes this nothing like a repetition of what has been before."

The film was named one of The Best 1000 Movies Ever Made by The New York Times.

== DVD ==
Payday was released by Warner Bros. on DVD January 8, 2008.

== See also ==
- List of American films of 1973
