= Yang Fuqing =

Yang Fuqing, may refer to:

- Yang Fuqing (general) (died 1874), a Chinese general during the Taiping Rebellion
- Yang Fuqing (scientist) (born 1932), a Chinese computer software expert, member of the Chinese Academy of Sciences
