= Hard Rain Falling =

Book by Don Carpenter

- First-edition cover
- Author: Don Carpenter
- Language: English
- Genre: Crime novel
- Publisher: Harcourt
- Publication date: 1966
- Publication place: United States
- Media type: Print
- Pages: 336

Hard Rain Falling is a 1966 crime novel written by Don Carpenter. The novel was Carpenter's first published book, and follows the adventures of Jack Levitt, an orphaned teenager living off his wits in the fleabag hotels and seedy pool halls of Portland, Oregon.

Upon its release the book was heralded as a readable, grim, and masterful debut. "…a first novel . . . of remarkable quality, written with authority, detachment and an almost uncanny, deadpan intelligence," wrote Martin Seymour-Smith in The Spectator, adding "I have seldom come across a new novel in which such compelling readability coexists with such absolute seriousness of purpose and keenness of psychological insight." Kirkus said that as a book "it's stringent, it's strong, and intensely alive."

In 2009, the book was re-published by New York Review Books as part of their Classics series, with an introduction by George Pelecanos. It was positively reviewed in The Washington Post and The Independent. Jonathan Lethem has praised it as one of the best American prison novels. Contemporary critics have noted the novel's sensitive treatment of same-sex relationships in prison, described by Pelecanos as "matter-of-fact, non-exploitive, and frequently moving."

== Summary ==
In the late 1940s Jack Levitt, abandoned at birth, runs away from an orphanage to bum around the streets of Portland. He takes to frequenting pool halls and befriends a group of teenaged delinquents, including Denny Mellon. Newly arriving in Portland is Billy Lancing, a black sixteen year old pool prodigy determined to make it on his own through hustling. Billy is quickly hustled by Denny who later introduces him to Jack. Billy is immediately frightened by Jack, however Jack has the opposite feeling towards Billy and immediately feels kinship and warmth towards him. Jack bets on Billy's skills during a game of pool with a local prodigy and wins the bet. The three later make plans to have a party at the home of the Weinfelds, friends of Denny's who are on vacation. Unbeknownst to Billy, Denny and Jack plan to fleece Billy at the party though they never follow through with the plan. During the evening Jack is envious of Denny, who plans to join the marines, and Billy, who has a talent for pool, and is frustrated with his own lack of a future. The following morning Jack is arrested for trespassing and is sent to a juvenile detention centre.

Years later, as a young adult in San Francisco, Jack runs into Denny again. The two men have had difficult experiences: Jack survived solitary confinement in juvenile detention and worked as a boxer while Denny experienced trauma in the Korean War and has taken to a life of petty crime. Denny introduces Jack to his girlfriend, Sue, and her friend Mona and though Jack and Sue are attracted to one another he begins sleeping with Mona. Running out of money Jack has a falling out with Denny and drinks himself into a stupor trying to reflect on what he wants out of life. He is later arrested in his hotel room where he learns that Sue and Mona are underage and have accused him of kidnapping and trafficking them. A county D.A. tells Jack that pleading to the kidnapping charge that he is not guilty of will lead to the charges of statutory rape being dropped against him. Jack reluctantly cooperates however the local judge does not play along and Jack is eventually sentenced and sent to Chino. In Chino Jack is placed in a cell with Billy Lancing who has conned his way into the white section of the segregated prison. Billy recounts how his life hustling in pool eventually led to a large score in which he earned enough to go to university. While in school Billy met a woman and married her, however he found traditional life unsatisfactory and was eventually convicted of cheque forgery. The two men eventually become lovers. After a while Billy confesses to Jack he loves him while Jack, who feels the same, remains unwilling to vocalize his feelings. Billy later murders a fellow inmate who had been planning to rape Jack and in the process is murdered himself.

At the age of 26 Jack is released from prison and tries to build a life in San Francisco. While working at a bakery he draws the ire of a wealthy young customer and is subsequently fired. She apologizes to Jack and offers him a job and the two quickly begin a sexual relationship. Sally offers to take Jack to Vegas where they quickly marry. Afterwards she explains that her money came from alimony which is being cut off now that she has remarried. Sally attempts to educate Jack, introducing him to important works of literature and art. Jack works as a parking attendant and decides after a while that children are what give meaning to life. He and Sally have a son that Jack names Billy Lancing Levitt.

Sally and Jack have a tempestuous marriage as she struggles to survive on his working class salary and revolts against motherhood. After she abandons young Billy without a babysitter Jack finally divorces her. He is shocked when she wants sole custody of their child, revealing that she is to marry Myron Bronson, a former friend and billionaire who had long been in love with her. Bronson tells Jack he wants to adopt Billy and he, Billy and Sally move to Paris.

Years later while vacationing in Saint-Tropez, Bronson begins hatching a plan to get sole custody of young Billy as he has tired of Sally but still loves his son. He hopes to one day tell Billy the truth about his father without Billy loathing or pitying Jack.
