= Robert Biehler =

American serial killer and contract killer

- Born: Robert Leroy Biehler; August 5, 1934; Chase, Kansas, U.S.
- Died: January 10, 1993 (aged 58); San Quentin State Prison, San Quentin, California, U.S.
- Conviction: First degree murder (4 counts)
- Penalty: Life imprisonment

Details
- Victims: 4
- Span of crimes: 1966–1974
- Country: United States
- State: California
- Date apprehended: December 12, 1975

Robert Leroy Biehler (August 5, 1934 – January 10, 1993) was an American serial killer who killed four people in various neighborhoods of Los Angeles, California from 1966 to 1974, either to cover up previous crimes or as part of contract murders. Unable to be sentenced to death due to Furman v. Georgia, Biehler was instead given four consecutive life terms, which he served until his death in 1993.

== Crimes ==
Biehler's first recorded criminal offense dates back to February 25, 1956, when he and two accomplices, 22-year-old Louis Evangelisti and 18-year-old Kay G. Mills, broke into the home of Paul and Marguerite Troutner in Pasadena during a robbery. After threatening to kill his wife if Troutner did not reveal where he hid his money, the trio tied them up with electric cords and gagged them with adhesive tape, before stealing money and valuables amounting to $1,500. Reportedly, one of the trio later bought a motorcycle with the loot, which led to the arrest of all three by the local authorities. For this crime, Biehler and the two men were each convicted and given a short prison term. After his release in the late 1950s, Biehler went on to commit a variety of crimes, most notable of which was participating in an organized burglary ring that stole $10,000 from a bank in 1960. He was later caught and ordered to serve another sentence at the California Institution for Men, from where he was eventually paroled in August 1966.

A few months later, on December 22, Biehler went to the North Hollywood home of a former associate, 38-year-old Julia Cook, who had an extensive criminal record for drug possession. Fearing that she might tell the police he was part of a prostitution ring, he held her and her 15-year-old son Kenneth at gunpoint, before forcing them to kneel and shooting each twice in the head. Police later detained him and an acquaintance, Morton Molin, for parole violations and attempted to charge the pair with the murders - however, the police department were forced to drop them due to lack of evidence. As a result, Biehler was instead jailed for parole violation while Molin was later tried for unrelated offences, and despite the officers best efforts, they were unable to charge him with the killings at the time.

After being paroled from prison in the early 1970s, Biehler again resumed with his criminal conduct, mainly centered around burglaries and pimping. On October 14, 1973, he confronted a retired paratrooper from Sunland, 28-year-old Michael Rodney Coveny, after the pair had a scuffle at a lounge in Shadow Hills for the latter missing the deadline for a $800 debt concerning cocaine. After driving him out to supposedly meet another supplier, Biehler threatened Coveny at gunpoint with a shotgun. Despite Coveny's pleas for mercy, he was shot and killed on the spot, and after his death, Biehler drove to the Angeles National Forest, where he buried his body in a shallow grave.

Approximately a year later, he was paid an undetermined sum of money by 34-year-old Maida Sue Ellington to kill her roommate, 33-year-old roller derby skater Carole E. Phillips, who had threatened to expose her criminal activities. Sometime during that month, Biehler, disguised as a plumber, went to the pair's shared apartment in Lake View Terrace, where he shot her four times in the head. Miraculously, Phillips survived, forcing Ellington to pay Biehler even more for a second attempt. He accepted, and Christmas Eve, shortly after leaving a bar in North Hollywood, Biehler confronted Phillips, pressed the gun up to her face and fired two shots into her eye and then her ear. To make sure that she was dead, he fired two additional shots into the body before leaving the crime scene.

== Arrest and trial ==
Several months after Phillips' murder, Ellington was arrested under charges of conspiracy to murder. At her trial, Ellington initially claimed that she was innocent and that an unknown person had shot and killed her friend, but evidence suggested that she was indeed the one who had paid for the hit. She was subsequently sentenced to life imprisonment and remanded to the California Institution for Women, where she was visited by Biehler on December 12. In the midst of the visitation, Biehler was arrested by officers of the LAPD and charged with fourfold murder, after they had found Coveny's body a few days prior.

The trial was marred with difficulties from the very beginning, as the prosecution asked for an extension regarding how long the convict could be detained, citing threats of harming the witnesses. The motion was granted over the protests of Biehler's attorney, Gerald Cohen, who claimed that this act would prejudice the prospective jury. From the beginning the prosecution announced that they would seek the death penalty under special circumstances, citing charges such as contract killing, kidnapping resulting in murder and a killing with prior murders.

After accepting a plea bargain in exchange for legal immunity, Biehler's ex-wife Janet testified that she had fabricated an alibi in the 1966 murders, claiming that he had been at home with her at the time. In her testimony, she confirmed suspicions that Biehler had indeed killed Cook because she supposedly threatened to rat him out to the police, and had later convinced her to lie for his benefit. Later on, one of Biehler's attorneys, Jeffrey Brodey, unsuccessfully attempted to petition for a mistrial to one of the higher courts, citing the fact that a dozen jurors had been excused from jury duty due to their views on the death penalty, but his request was promptly shot down. Another attorney, Donald Wager, who later dropped out of the case, was later sentenced to 10 days in jail for contempt of court over his refusal to divulge the details of a conversation he had had with his client prior to his resignation. On his part, Biehler claimed that he was not responsible for the murders, even pinning the Coveny killing on his wife, claiming that she had accompanied the pair to the supposed meeting with the dealer and had accidentally shot their hostage after he had attempted to snatch the shotgun out of her hands.

== Imprisonment and death ==
In spite of his various claims, neither judge nor jury were swayed by Biehler's explanations, and he was subsequently convicted on all counts. The ruling came after five days of deliberations. Due to the statute at the time, Justice Harry V. Peetris was forced to sentence Biehler to four consecutive life terms with chance of parole, as the law prohibited him applying either the death penalty or life without parole. He expressed his disappointment with the verdict in court statements, but reiterated that he had to abide by the law.

In the aftermath of the verdict, Peetrus published a letter addressing the criticisms surrounding the verdict, and advocated that the citizens take action and demand judicial reform, as the sentencing laws were being reviewed at the time. The later rulings did not affect Biehler's sentence, which he served at San Quentin State Prison until his death from cancer in 1993.

== See also ==
- List of serial killers in the United States
