= Rodolfo Cadena =

Mexican-American mob boss (1943–1972)

Rodolfo "Cheyenne" Cadena
- Born: Rodolfo Alvarado Cadena; April 15, 1943; San Antonio, Texas, U.S.
- Died: December 17, 1972 (aged 29); Chino, California, U.S.
- Cause of death: Homicide (stabbed and beaten to death)
- Resting place: Union Cemetery, Bakersfield, California, U.S.
- Other names: Cheyenne; CHY
- Occupations: Mobster; Mob Boss
- Parents: Daniel Hernandez Cadena (father); Anita Alvarado (mother)
- Status: Deceased

Rodolfo Alvarado "Cheyenne" Cadena (April 15, 1943 – December 17, 1972) was a Mexican-American mob boss and a prominent figure in the Mexican Mafia prison gang also called La eMe (Spanish for the letter M).

== Biography ==
Cadena was born on April 15, 1943, in San Antonio, Texas, the son of second-generation Mexican immigrants Anita (née Alvarado) and Daniel Hernandez Cadena. The family later moved to Bakersfield, California, where Cadena attended East Bakersfield High School. Cadena became a member of the Varrio Viejo Gang (now known as the Varrio Bakers). He was incarcerated at Deuel Vocational Institution after he and Richard Ruiz, who would become one of the founding members of La eMe, stabbed a man to death outside of a dancehall called 'Salón Juárez' in 1959. At the time of his conviction, Cadena was only 16 years old. While incarcerated, he earned the respect and admiration of the members of the Mexican Mafia which was still in its development stage.

According to Chris Blatchford,

By 1961, administrators at DVI, alarmed by the escalating violence, had transferred a number of the charter Eme members to San Quentin, hoping to discourage their violent behavior by intermingling them with hardened adult convicts. It didn't work. For example, the story goes that Cheyenne Cadena arrived on the lower yard and was met by a six-foot-five, 300-pound black inmate who planted a kiss on his face and announced this scrawny teenager would now be his 'bitch.' Chy returned a short time later, walked up to the unsuspecting predator, and stabbed him to death with a jailhouse knife, or shiv. There were more than a thousand inmates on the yard. No witnesses stepped forward, and only one dead man entertained the idea that Cadena was anybody's bitch.

Cadena and Joe "Pegleg" Morgan, who became his best friend and mentor, led the gang to prominence in the California correctional system by terrorizing other unorganized ethnic inmate groups, gaining a monopoly over the sale of drugs, pornography, prostitution, extortion, and murder for hire.

Cadena continued to run the Mafia's activities and began to look beyond the walls of the prison, envisioning a statewide monopoly of crime. He struck an uneasy alliance with George Jackson and the Black Guerrilla Family and became active in Latino political organizations like the Brown Berets. Cadena made overtures to unite La Eme with the rival Nuestra Familia (NF). His peace talks with "the farmeros" were frowned upon by Joe Morgan and other senior eMe leaders. In response, they ordered the murder of two Familia leaders just prior to an important peace conference between Cadena and Death Row inmate Joe Gonzalez, an NF leader at Chino Reception center, undermining Cadena's peace mission and effectively "green-lighting" him. With no remaining influence in the Mexican Mafia, his importance in the eyes of the NF was diminished; he was now a target for retribution. . On his arrival in Chino for the now sabotaged peace mission, he was taunted by the Norteños and told his time would come.

=== Death and afterward ===
The night before his death, Cadena had received multiple death threats and knew that when he left his cell in the morning, he would die. On the morning of December 17, 1972, Cadena was asked if he wanted to leave his cell with the rest of the prisoners; rather than avoiding his fate and staying in his cell, he stepped onto the tier of his cell in "Palm Hall" at the Chino Reception center. He was stabbed repeatedly with shanks, and beaten with a pipe by Nuestra Familia assassins. He was stabbed an estimated fifty times on the tier and thrown off a third story tier onto the concrete floor below and stabbed another dozen times. Cadena was subsequently buried at Union Cemetery in Bakersfield, California with an inscription reading, "Recuerdo de tu madre y familia" (Remembered by your mother and family.) His parents would divorce shortly afterwards.

== Legacy ==
Cadena's murder sparked an era of gang warfare within the California penal system. Over the next year, 31 prisoners lost their lives in tit-for-tat killings. After over 40 years of warfare, there has now been an official end of hostilities between these two groups.

Cadena was the basis for the 1992 movie American Me, in which, Montoya Santana, a character based upon Cadena, was portrayed by Edward James Olmos. The Mexican Mafia, however, was enraged by certain parts of the movie, especially the portrayal of Santana being raped in juvenile hall and a climax in which Santana is murdered by his own followers. Two of Olmos' consultants on the film were subsequently murdered and a plot to extort the director was uncovered.

== See also ==
- List of known gang members
