= Louie Cruz Beltran =

American Latin jazz musician

- Occupation: Musician
- Relatives: Robert Beltran (brother)

Louie Cruz Beltran is an American Latin jazz musician. Beltran is the son of first generation Mexican-American parents. Among his seven brothers and two sisters is the former Star Trek: Voyager actor Robert Beltran.

== Background ==
Beltran's music uses Afro-Latin rhythms combined with influences from jazz, Latin jazz, pop and R&B.

After graduating from East Bakersfield High School, Beltran began his formal music education while attending Bakersfield College in the early 1970s. He played with the Bakersfield Jazz Ensemble under the direction of Doc Woods and later worked as a percussionist on "The Writer's Album" as a member of the Cal State Jazz Ensemble under the direction of Charles Argersinger. He has performed with Ray Barretto, Mongo Santamaria, Tito Puente, Francisco Aquabella, Jorge Claudio, Natalie Cole, Gladys Knight, Stevie Wonder and Smokey Robinson.

In 2005, Louie Cruz played Manny Gonzalez in the film Mexican Werewolf in Texas.
