= Keith Carpenter (Canadian football) =

American gridiron football player

Profile
- Position: Tackle

Personal information
- Born: c. 1930 (age 95–96)
- Listed height: 6 ft 3 in (1.91 m)
- Listed weight: 220 lb (100 kg)

Career information
- High school: East (Bakersfield, California)
- College: San Jose State
- NFL draft: 1951: 26th round, 306th overall pick

Career history
- 1952: Edmonton Eskimos
- 1953: Winnipeg Blue Bombers

Keith Carpenter (born c. 1930) was an American professional football player who played for the Edmonton Eskimos and Winnipeg Blue Bombers. He played college football at San Jose State University.
