= Mark William Cunningham =

American serial killer

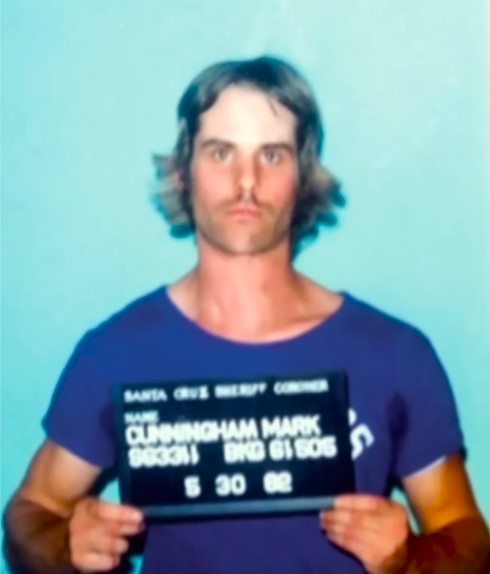
- Mugshot
- Born: January 27, 1960 (age 66); Santa Clara County, California, U.S.
- Convictions: First degree murder with special circumstances (2 counts); Second degree murder
- Penalty: Life sentence without the possibility of parole

Details
- Victims: 3
- Span of crimes: April 27 – June 7, 1983
- Country: United States
- State: California
- Date apprehended: January 3, 1985
- Imprisoned at: Ironwood State Prison

Mark William Cunningham (born January 27, 1960) is an American serial killer and arsonist who shot and killed three men at random in Santa Cruz and Laguna Beach, California, between April and June 1983. The murders remained unsolved for nearly two years until Cunningham's gun was tied to the crime scenes based on ballistic evidence. He was tried, found guilty, and sentenced to life without the possibility of parole in 1988.

== Murders ==
=== Mark Ferrell ===
On April 27, 1983, Santa Cruz authorities responded to call about a burning vehicle found along East Zayante Road. Firemen arrived and were able to stop the fire, but soon after they discovered a dead body lying in the front seat. The man, later identified as 20-year-old electronics worker Mark Cameron Ferrell, was determined to have been shot multiple times before the killer set his car on fire. A bullet was recovered from Ferrell's chest which was determined to have come from an Old West style .38 caliber revolver.

=== Hon Lee and Chen Ying ===
On June 7, 1983, the bodies of two men were discovered by a duo of surfers lying face down and riddled with gunshot wounds on a trail leading from Laguna Beach to Highway 1. Just a few hours after the discovery, a man who had been witnessed walking away from the crime scene was arrested by local police, but quickly released as no evidence linked him to the murders. The two bodies were identified as 30-year-old Hon Mau Lee and 29-year-old Chen Chien Ying, both of Chinatown, Los Angeles. Authorities noted the randomness of the killings; the killer had not tried to hide the bodies, and investigators speculated the perpetrator shot the two at random while they walked down the trail. In addition, none of the men's personal and valuable possessions had been taken.

== Arrest ==
In November 1983, ballistics evidence showed that there was a 90 percent chance that the same gun had been used in the three killings. Despite the breakthrough, at the time, police had few leads, and for over a year, detectives were frustrated as the case sat unsolved with no suspects. However, on January 3, 1985, a man called police to turn in his friend Mark William Cunningham, whom he overheard bragging about killing three men.

In addition, Cunningham's girlfriend Lynn Bohnen came forward. She had met Cunningham in 1981, when she was 14 and Cunningham was 21, and the two started a relationship, though the two did stop dating after a while. In 1984 she broke down to her new boyfriend, Steve Walker, that she had been with Cunningham the day of Lee and Ying's murders, and that she knew he had killed them. She later told detectives the same story. Following this, Cunningham was arrested.

== Trial and imprisonment ==
Cunningham was indicted on three counts of first-degree murder. He pleaded not guilty. In October 1985, it was announced that prosecutors would seek the death penalty. In January 1988, Cunningham went to trial. The star witness in the case was Bohnen. Bohnen took the stand and told the jury that on June 7, 1983, after Cunningham had picked her up from school, they stopped across from Laguna Beach. Cunningham then spotted the two men walking up the trail to the beach and pulled a gun from under his seat then followed the men up the trail. Shortly after, according to Bohnen, Cunningham sprinted back to his vehicle and frantically drove away.

In early February, the seven women and five men jury found Cunningham guilty of two counts of first-degree murder for the killings of Lee and Ying and found him guilty of one count of second-degree murder for the killing of Ferrell. That same April, the jury spared his life and decided to sentence Cunningham to life imprisonment without the possibility of parole. Following his sentencing, Cunningham was transferred to Pelican Bay State Prison in Del Norte County, where he has remained ever since.

== Media ==
In 2003, Discovery Channel TV show The New Detectives aired the episode "Random Targets", which examined Cunningham's case along with Timothy Wilson Spencer.

== See also ==
- List of serial killers in the United States
