= Mexican Mafia =

Mexican American criminal organization

- The primary symbol used by La eMe
- Founded: 1957; 69 years ago
- Founder: Luis "Huero Buff" Flores
- Founding location: Deuel Vocational Institution, California, United States
- Years active: 1957–present
- Territory: West Coast and Southwestern United States, and throughout the federal prison system and Californian prison system
- Ethnicity: Mexican American
- Membership: 250–300 "made" members
- Activities: Drug trafficking, extortion, illegal gambling, prostitution, assault and murder
- Allies: Armenian Power; Aryan Brotherhood; Gambino crime family; Hells Angels MC (1960s–1980s); Independent Soldiers; Los Angeles crime family; Mexikanemi; Mongols MC; MS-13; Sinaloa Cartel; Sureños Tijuana Cartel
- Rivals: Black Guerrilla Family; Hells Angels MC (1980s–present); Norteños; Nuestra Familia]
- Notable members: Rodolfo Cadena; Rene Enriquez; Jose Landa-Rodriguez; Joe "Pegleg" Morgan

The Mexican Mafia (Spanish: Mafia Mexicana), also known as The M (Spanish: La eMe), is a predominantly Mexican American prison gang and criminal organization in the United States. Despite its name, the Mexican Mafia has no origins in Mexico and is entirely a U.S. prison-based organization. Law enforcement officials report that the Mexican Mafia is the deadliest and most powerful gang within the California prison system.

Government officials state that there are currently 350–500 official members of the Mexican Mafia with thousands of hitmen and associates within prison and an estimate of more than 50,000 loyal foot soldiers who also carry out its illegal activities on the streets in the hopes of becoming full members. The Mexican Mafia has immense influence and control over every Hispanic street gang in Southern California, including the notoriously brutal MS-13 and 18th Street Gang, since in the prison system inmates are recruited into gangs based on race regardless of street gang affiliation. The U.S. Government considers the Mexican Mafia to be "among the most powerful, dangerous and feared criminal organizations in the world".

== History ==
The Mexican Mafia was formed in 1957 by thirteen Hispanic street gang members from different Los Angeles neighborhoods who were incarcerated at the Deuel Vocational Institution, a California Youth Authority facility, which later became an adult state prison in Tracy, California, closing in 2021. The organization was formed to create a Mexican version of the Italian Mafia, which at the time was the most powerful group in the prison system. One of the founders of La eMe is Luis "Huero Buff" Flores, who was an active member of the Barrio Hawaiian Gardens gang in Hawaiian Gardens, California. Gang warfare between Hispanic neighborhoods was the norm during the 1950s and 60s, so the fact that Luis Flores was able to get established enemies to set aside their rivalry upon entry into the prison system was something that was not thought possible. This requirement exists to the present day. Hispanic street gangs like White Fence, The Avenues, Clanton 14, Hawaiian Gardens, Varrio Nuevo Estrada, and Primera Flats, were already into their second decade and firmly established as self-sustaining entities. Luis Flores initially recruited violent members to the gang in an attempt to create a highly feared organization which could control the black market activities of the Deuel prison facilities. La eMe member Ramon "Mundo" Mendoza claims that in the beginning the overall goal was to terrorize the prison system and enjoy prison comforts while doing time. It is said that the name "Mexican Mafia" was to show organization similar to the American Mafia but it was later changed so as not to be confused with it. Furthermore, the black hand symbol was a reference to the Black Hand of the early 20th century.

=== Rise ===
By 1961, violence got so bad at the Deuel Vocational Institution that administrators transferred a number of the charter La eMe members to San Quentin Penitentiary in the hopes of discouraging their violent behavior. This tactic failed. Cheyenne Cadena arrived on the lower yard of San Quentin and was met by a six-foot-five, 300-pound black inmate who kissed him. Cadena returned a short time later, walked up to the unsuspecting predator, and stabbed him to death with a jailhouse knife, or shiv. Despite there being more than a thousand inmates on the yard, no witnesses stepped forward.

A string of other slayings soon followed as Mexican Mafia members sought to establish a reputation among the inmates of San Quentin. The Mexican Mafia's quest for complete control alienated many other Mexican-American inmates who were fed up with Mexican Mafia stabbing, killing, and stealing their watches, rings, cigarettes and anything else of value. Some of them secretly founded a new prison gang called Nuestra Familia (NF) or "Our Family." It was first established in the mid-1960s at the California Correctional Training Facility in Soledad. Some of the early members were from the Los Angeles area, but NF soon drew inmates primarily from rural communities in Northern California. The Mexican Mafia saw Nuestra Familia as inferior and "just a bunch of farmers", or farmeros. However, in 1968 at San Quentin, a full-scale riot broke out after a Mexican Mafia soldier, or soldado, stole a pair of shoes from a Nuestra Familia sympathizer. Nineteen inmates were stabbed and one La eMe associate ended up dead. The battle became known as the "Shoe War" and it established Nuestra Familia as the major La eMe rival.

The Mexican Mafia gained significant power and control over illegal activities in the California prison system by using violence. The gang also extended its influence outside the prison system when members who were released from custody began taking control of narcotics distribution in parts of Southern California, primarily by "taxing" drug dealers.

=== New Mexican Mafia ===
La eMe should not be confused with the New Mexican Mafia. Around 1974, a group of Hispanic inmates at Arizona State Prison, Florence, formed a prison gang known as the Mexican Mafia. Arizona Department of Corrections officials at that time obtained information that this group patterned themselves after the California Mexican Mafia which had been in existence for several years. Several Hispanics who came into the Arizona Prison System brought the concept and philosophy of the California Mexican Mafia. In 1978 the Mexican Mafia split into two organizations. One kept the original philosophy and structure and currently refer to themselves as the Original Mexican Mafia, "Califas Faction", "EME". The other, which came into prominence in 1984 and refer to themselves as the New Mexican Mafia. Many assaults and murders of members of both groups have occurred as a result of each organization claiming the title of "Mexican Mafia" within the Arizona prison system. They have created their own rules and regulations and have established an organizational structure. Each member is allowed to vote on issues regarding membership and leadership. The leader, approved by the members, has the power to solely decide important issues.

== Culture ==
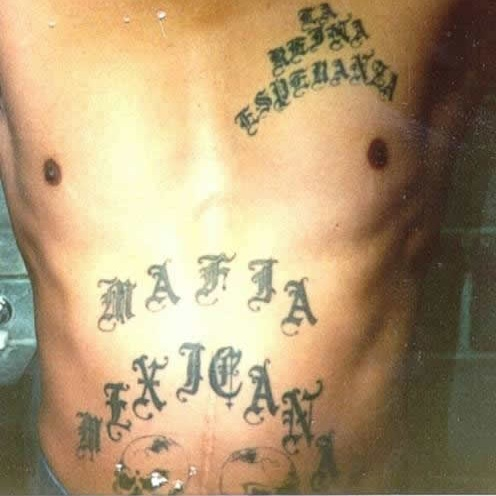
The organization's name tattooed on member's abdomen.

Law enforcement believes that La eMe presently is not presided over by a single leader. Many Mexican Mafia members have the authority to order murders and oversee various other criminal activities. They have almost a thousand associates that help carry out those orders and have the theoretical control of all Sureño gang members. Members are expected to engage in tests of their loyalty to La eMe, which may include theft or murder. The penalty for refusing orders or failing to complete an assigned task is often death. According to the gang's constitution, members may also be punished or murdered if they commit any of four major infractions. These include becoming an informant, acts of homosexuality, acts of cowardice, and showing disrespect against fellow gang members. According to gang policy, a member of the Mexican Mafia may not be murdered without prior approval by a vote of three members, yet the murder of non-members requires no formal approval.

During the early 1960s at San Quentin Prison, Luis "Huero Buff" Flores and Rudy "Cheyenne" Cadena established a blood oath for members of the Mexican Mafia. Prior to the establishment of the oath, members of the Mexican Mafia were allowed to return to their street gangs after incarceration. The new oath stipulated that the only way for a member to leave the Mexican Mafia was to be killed. Flores and Cadena also established a set of gang commandments. These included policies such as: a new member must be sponsored by an existing member, unanimous approval from all existing members to join (no longer policy), prioritizing the gang over one's family, denial of the existence of the Mexican Mafia to law enforcement or non-members, respect of other members, and forgiving street conflicts which existed before incarceration. Execution of a member of the gang for policy violation must be committed by the gang member who sponsored him. La eMe has a blood-in, blood-out policy: murder or drawing of blood is a prerequisite for membership and anyone trying to get out will be killed.

=== Rules ===
1. A member may not be an informant.
2. A member may not be a coward.

The rules of conduct are:

1. A member may not raise a hand against another member without approval from the higher-ups and leaders.
2. A member must not show disrespect for any member's family, including sex with another member's wife, or girlfriend.
3. A member must not steal from another member.
4. A member may not be homosexual, sex offender, child killer, child molester, or rapist.
5. A member must not politic against another member or cause dissension within the organization.
6. Membership is for life, the only way out is death.
7. Retaliation must be carried out if anyone crosses La eMe, no exceptions.
8. Vendetta must be carried out, even if it takes months, years, or decades.
9. If a member of La eMe gets harmed or killed by someone else such as police, or another criminal gang, retaliation must be immediate, and must be swift, brutal and deadly.
10. It is mandatory to assault/kill all dropouts and traitors.
11. La eMe comes first. Even before your own family, religion and god.
12. A member must not interfere with another member's business activities.
13. A member must never harm children.
14. A member must always treat another member's family with respect and kindness.
15. A member must protect another member from harm.
16. A member must treat another member like a brother.

=== Allies and rivals ===
The Mexican Mafia is the controlling organization for almost every Hispanic gang in Southern California, and some gangs located in Central and Northern California, with their vassal gangs being called Sureños. Members of almost all Hispanic gangs in Southern California are obliged under the threat of death to carry out any and all orders from made Mexican Mafia members. The Mexican Mafia also holds a loose alliance with the Aryan Brotherhood, mainly due to their common rivals within the prison system.

The primary rivals of the Mexican Mafia are Nuestra Familia. The Mexican Mafia is also a rival of the Black Guerrilla Family prison gang, which holds a loose alliance with La Nuestra Familia. Bloods and Crips are the new enemies.

=== Symbols ===
Mexican Mafia symbols include images of a black hand. The gang's primary symbol, which is often used in tattoos by members, is the national symbol of Mexico (eagle and a snake) atop a flaming circle over crossed knives. Street gangs that are aligned with the Mexican Mafia often use the number 13 as a gang identifier, as the letter "M" is the 13th letter of the modern Latin-derived alphabet.

== Criminal activities ==
According to the FBI, the Mexican Mafia had arranged for contract killings to be carried out by the Aryan Brotherhood, a white prison gang. The Mexican Mafia and the Aryan Brotherhood are mutual enemies of the Norteños and the African-American gangs Black Guerrilla Family and D.C. Blacks. Even though homosexuals are barred from entry into La eMe, they are engaged heavily in homosexual prostitution in the prison system. Many of the street level homicides in the Highland Park area of Los Angeles committed by the Avenues gang were done on orders issued by the Mexican Mafia.

The Mexican Mafia is involved in a variety of criminal activities both inside and outside the prison system, but its main source of income is extorting drug distributors outside prison and distributing various narcotics within and outside the prison system. In 1992, an example of La eMe's influence and power over Sureños was made clear to law enforcement. Joe "Pegleg" Morgan, a prominent Mexican Mafia leader, ordered that no more drive-by shootings and violence were to take place by Sureños. Between April, when the edict was announced, and September 1992 there were no drive-by shootings in East Los Angeles, an area that was notorious for violence and drive-bys.

=== 1950s ===
In 1957, Gregory Huerta Valenzuela and Augustin Acosta, two Mexican Mafia associates and members of the White Fence gang, shot and killed grocer Jose Castellanos during a robbery in East Los Angeles. On May 13, 1958, while standing trial for Castellanos' murder at the Hall of Justice, Valenzuela and Acosta managed to stab Los Angeles County Sheriff's Department (LASD) sergeant Ned Lovretovich with sharpened spoons after Lovretovich had given testimony against the pair. Valenzuela and Acosta were convicted of first-degree murder in the death of Castellanos and sentenced to life in state prison. They also pled guilty to assault with intent to commit murder and injury to a county employee for the stabbing of Lovretovich and were given sentences to run concurrently with their life terms.

The first murder of a prison guard by La eMe was carried out by Doroteo "Sleepy" Betancourt and Frank "Moose" Bazure at San Quentin State Prison in June 1958.

=== 1970s ===
The first murder outside of prison that was ordered by La eMe occurred in 1971 when Mexican Mafia member Alfonso "Pachie" Alvarez was found shot twice in the head in a secluded area of Monterey Park. His offense: collecting taxes on narcotics dealers without kicking up the profits to eMe leaders behind bars, known in the gang as "Big Homies" or Emeros. The person responsible for the murder was Joe "Pegleg" Morgan—the notorious white godfather of La eMe who had ascended by then to become one of the highest-ranking bosses of the entire organization, even with no "official" Mexican blood himself. His connections with cocaine and heroin suppliers in Mexico helped pave the foundation for the Mexican Mafia's narcotics distribution throughout California. During the 1970s, while under the control of Morgan's protégé Rodolfo Cadena, the Mexican Mafia often took control over various community groups. The gang was able to filter money from alcohol and drug prevention programs to finance their criminal activities.

The Mexican Mafia and the Italian-American Los Angeles crime family collaborated in skimming money from Get Going, a taxpayer-funded drug treatment program. By 1977, Get Going founder Ellen Delia was determined to expose the infiltration of her beloved program. Shortly before an appointment with the California State Secretary of Health and Welfare Services, Delia was murdered. Her collection of evidence on Italian and Mexican Mafia infiltration of the Get Going program was never recovered.

=== 1980s ===
On October 14, 1984, Alfred Arthur "Chato" Sandoval, a high ranking eMe member and Arizona Maravilla gangster, shot and killed Gilbert Martinez and Anthony Aceves during a gang-related fight in Belvedere Park, East Los Angeles; a third victim, Manuel Torres, survived the attack. The victims were members of the Mariana Marivilla gang. Around two weeks later, on October 31, 1984, Ray and Marlene Wells were also shot execution-style in their home in Baldwin Park. Sandoval killed Ray Wells because he believed the man had told police of the whereabouts of the car he used in the Belvedere Park murders; Marlene Wells was then killed because she had witnessed the murder of her husband. Sandoval was convicted on four counts of first-degree murder in Los Angeles County Superior Court and was sentenced to death for the murder of Marlene Wells, and to life in prison without the possibility of parole for the murders of Martinez, Aceves and Ray Wells. On November 6, 2000, Sandoval had his death sentence for the murder of Marlene Wells overturned by the 9th Circuit Court of Appeals but remained imprisoned for life without parole.

Two Mexican Mafiosi, the brothers Hector and Ronaldo Ayala, along with a third man, bound and then killed three others — Ernesto "Chacho" Mendez Dominguez, Marco Zamora-Villa, and Jose Luis "Cucuy" Rositas — by shooting them execution-style at the A & Z Auto Repair shop in the Logan Heights neighborhood of Southeast San Diego after demanding $10,000 from the men, who were allegedly involved in the heroin trade, on April 26, 1985. A fourth shooting victim, Pedro "Pete" Castillo, survived and identified the Ayala brothers as the killers. Ronaldo Ayala was convicted of three counts of first-degree murder, attempted murder, robbery, and attempted robbery, on October 12, 1988, and sentenced to be executed in the gas chamber at San Quentin State Prison, on February 9, 1989. Hector Ayala, who stood trial separately, was convicted on the same charges, on August 1, 1989 and also sentenced to death, on November 17, 1989. The third defendant, Joseph Moreno, was acquitted of all charges.

=== 1990s ===
On July 16, 1991, Mexican Mafia members Benjamin "Topo" Peters and Rene "Boxer" Enriquez stabbed another eMe member, Salvador "Mon" Buenrostro, at the Los Angeles County Jail. Buenrostro, who survived the attack despite being stabbed 26 times, was targeted because he had sided against Joe "Pegleg" Morgan in internal gang affairs.

Mexican Mafia member Charles "Charlie Brown" Manriquez was targeted for death by the gang when he was accused of cowardice after failing to carry out a prearranged stabbing on another inmate at the Chino State Prison in 1991. Manriquez was fatally shot to death by La eMe hitman David "Smilon" Gallardo in the Ramona Gardens housing project in the Boyle Heights neighborhood of Los Angeles, on March 25, 1992.

In 1998, United States federal authorities indicted 22 members and associates of the Mexican Mafia, charged under the federal Racketeer Influenced and Corrupt Organizations Act with crimes which included extortion, murder, and kidnapping. One of the arrested members, Benjamin "Topo" Peters (Arizona Maravilla), was allegedly the Mexican Mafia's highest-ranking member at the time, and was engaged in a power struggle with fellow member Ruben "Tupi" Hernandez (Onterio Varrio Sur – Ontario, California). Another indicted member was accused of having plotted the death of an anti-gang activist who served as a consultant for the film American Me. The indictments marked a two-year investigation by federal, local, and state law enforcement officials.

=== 2000s ===
Mike "Acha" Ison, a Mexican Mafia leader described by San Francisco Chronicle writer Julian Guthrie as "a small man with a giant reputation who had survived 30 years in California's toughest prisons", was beaten to death by three or four people armed with pool cues after he was involved in a bar fight at Grady's Bar in the Mission District of San Francisco, on March 25, 2001.

On 18 December 2003, a 34-year-old man Daniel Larson who was the owner of D&D Auto Recycling in Fort Collins disappeared in either Larimer County or Weld County, Colorado. The day prior Larson told his ex-wife that he had to meet with members of the Mexican Mafia over an unpaid debt. On 28 December Larson’s gray 1990 Pontiac 6000 was discovered at a Park & Ride, evidence of foul play was discovered in the car, most notably blood in the trunk of the car. On 13 January 2004 hunters discovered Larson’s body in a field north of Kersey near Weld County Roads 388 and 59.

In 2006, a 36-count federal indictment was brought against members of the Mexican Mafia. The arrests were made for alleged acts of violence, drug dealing, and extortion against smaller Latino street gangs. According to the federal indictment, Mexican Mafia members exert their influence in both federal and state prison systems through either violence or the threat of violence. Members and associates of the gang remain fiercely loyal to the criminal organization both in and outside of prison, particularly in Southern California cities such as Los Angeles and San Diego. The gang asserts its influence over Chicano gangs throughout Southern California by threatening violence against their members should they ever become incarcerated. Gangs and drug dealers who refuse to pay a protection "tax" to the Mexican Mafia are often murdered or threatened with murder. High-ranking members of the Mexican Mafia who are locked in private cells for 23 hours of each day are still able to communicate with their associates, through methods which range from tapping in code on prison plumbing pipes to smuggled letters. The primary goal of the Mexican Mafia is to control all drug trafficking in all areas that they have been established.

=== 2010s ===
In early 2012 there was a federal indictment of 119 San Diego County gang members, including a Mexican Mafia boss that was arrested in a raid of his San Marcos home, which portrays a sprawling, well-organized criminal network that ran drug dealing on the streets of North County and even extended inside the Vista jail. Rudy "Crazy" Espudo (Esco Varrio Diablos – Escondido, California) was in control of the Hispanic gangs in the area and forced drug dealers to pay taxes in tribute to La eMe or face the consequences. The local gangs were smuggling narcotics into the Vista Detention Center in order to sell them for the Mexican Mafia. On North County streets, La eMe ordered Surenos to obtain taxes from the local drug dealers. Members of the Azusa 13 gang, associated with the Mexican Mafia, were indicted in 2011 for harassing and intimidating black people in Southern California.

=== 2020s ===
On January 31, 2022, a fight broke out between members of the Mexican Mafia and MS-13 at United States Penitentiary, Beaumont, Texas, causing two fatalities and leading to all U.S. federal prisons being placed on lockdown due to fears of retaliatory attacks.

A joint investigation by the Los Angeles Police Department (LAPD) and the Federal Bureau of Investigation (FBI) into the Westside Wilmas gang in the Los Angeles Harbor Region commenced in October 2022 and culminated with the arrests of 12 Mexican Mafia members and the seizure of 23 firearms, 57.7 pounds of methamphetamine, approximately 23,000 fentanyl pills, 5.2 pounds of powdered fentanyl and 2.2 pounds of cocaine as search warrants were executed in the South Bay and as far as Bakersfield, on May 17, 2023.

On January 21, 2025, a coordinated operation led by the San Diego Police Department and other law enforcement agencies resulted in the arrest of 39 individuals associated with the Mexican Mafia during a six-month investigation that uncovered a vast network of criminal activities orchestrated by the Mafia's leadership, even from within prison walls. The arrested individuals faced serious charges, including murder, attempted murder, arson, extortion, and weapons and drug trafficking. The operation also led to the seizure of over three dozen firearms and multiple pounds of methamphetamine, cocaine, and fentanyl. The investigation revealed that the Mexican Mafia exerted control over various street gangs, compelling them to pay "taxes" on drug sales and other illicit activities. Business owners were subjected to threats of violence, including vandalism, arson, physical harm, and even murder if they failed to comply with extortion demands.

== In popular culture ==
The Mexican Mafia received mainstream notoriety after being featured in the 1992 movie American Me. The film was co-produced, directed and starred in by actor Edward James Olmos, who allegedly received death threats by members of the Mexican Mafia for what they considered an unflattering depiction of the gang. Two consultants for the film were murdered shortly after the film's release, though it is unclear whether the murders were tied to the Mexican Mafia or to recent layoffs that had provoked death threats. The Mexican Mafia was allegedly displeased with the portrayal of the murder of Rodolfo Cadena (who was the basis for Olmos' character Santana) as being committed by his fellow gang members. Mexican Mafia members were also allegedly offended by the portrayal of a homosexual rape committed by Puppet, a Mexican Mafia character in the film who in the latter part of the movie murders his own brother, Li'l Puppet, for disrespecting La eMe. Olmos subsequently applied for a concealed handgun permit, which was denied. While serving a life sentence for murder at Pelican Bay State Prison, Joe "Pegleg" Morgan, filed a $500,000 lawsuit against Olmos, Universal Studios, and other producers of the film. Morgan claimed that one of the principal characters in the film was based on him without obtaining his permission.

The 1993 film Blood In Blood Out is loosely based on the Mexican Mafia, although the story is fictional. The protagonist Miklo Velka is largely based on Joe "Pegleg" Morgan, being white and having lost his leg from getting shot during a robbery (one of the rumored ways that Morgan lost his). The prison gangs named in the film are in turn inspired by real-life counterparts: La Onda (Mexican Mafia), Black Guerilla Army (Black Guerilla Family), and Aryan Vanguard (Aryan Brotherhood).

== See also ==
- Hermanos de Pistoleros Latinos
- Mexikanemi
- Texas Syndicate

== Bibliography ==
- Christie, George (2016). Exile on Front Street: My Life as a Hells Angel. New York City: Thomas Dunne Books. ISBN 9780283072666.
