= Curtis Carroll =

American inmate

- Born: 1978 (age 47–48); Washington, D.C., U.S.
- Known for: FEEL—Financial Empowerment Emotional Literacy
- Title: The Oracle of San Quentin; Wall Street
- Term: 54 years to life
- Criminal charges: Burglary, murder
- Criminal status: Released from San Quentin Prison, California
- Website: https://projectfeel.org/

Curtis "Wall Street" Carroll (born 1978) is an American former prisoner in California's San Quentin State Prison, released from serving a sentence of 54 years to life for murder. He has earned the nickname "Wall Street" and "The Oracle of San Quentin". Curtis Wall Street Carroll has been featured in numerous publications like the Wall Street Journal, Forbes, BBC and NPR.

== Early life ==
Carroll was born in Washington, D.C. and later moved to East Oakland, where he grew up. His mother was a waitress at a bowling alley and the family was often on welfare. He later befriended his mother's drug dealer, who taught him to steal quarters from arcade machines. Carroll was eventually caught and sentenced to juvenile hall.

== Prison ==
Carroll was arrested for murder in 1996 when he was 17. He surrendered to police and was sentenced to a minimum of 54 years with a maximum of life. He was illiterate when he was imprisoned but learned to read and write at the age of 20.

Carroll became interested in the stock market after realizing its financial potential. He learned about the markets through newspaper financial sections. He got his start investing in penny stocks by cashing in unused postage stamps he bought with revenue from his tobacco sales to other prisoners.

Carroll was transferred to San Quentin Prison in 2012.

=== Financial literacy courses ===
Carroll along with fellow inmate Troy Williams, started the Financial Literacy Program. Together they created F.E.E.L (Financial Empowerment Emotional Literacy), a project Carroll gave a TED talk about in 2019. As of September 5, 2024, Carroll's TED (conference) has 4.2M views on YouTube.

Carroll has taught a financial literacy class with Zak Williams, the son of comedian Robin Williams and a graduate of Columbia Business School. The class educated inmates on how they can develop skills applicable to life outside prison. He has been called the "Oracle of San Quentin", and when asked in 2017, Carroll was optimistic Donald Trump’s presidency would stimulate the economy.

In 2023, Curtis Carroll was featured in Forbes magazine.

== Philosophy ==
Carroll's philosophy is that most crime is attributed to a lack of financial security, which has led him to teach other San Quentin State Prison inmates about the stock market.

== See also ==
- Juvenile court
- Defense of infancy
- American juvenile justice system
