= California Institution for Men =

State prison in Chino, California

California Institution for Men (CIM)
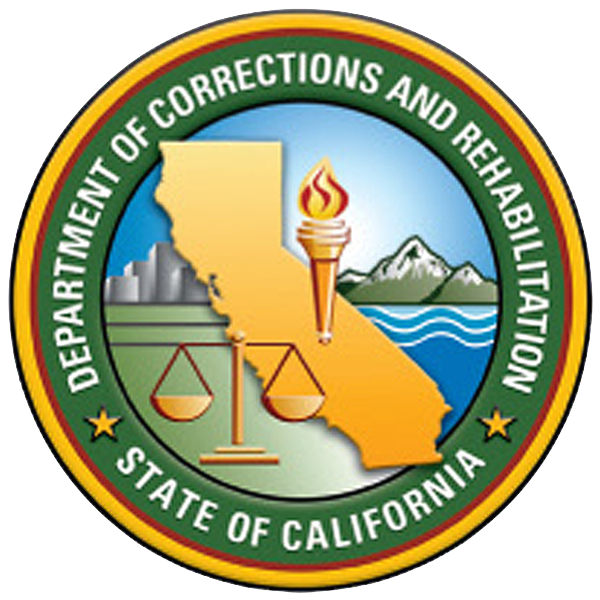
- Aerial View
- Interactive map of California Institution for Men (CIM)
- Location: Chino, California; 33.982°N 117.682°W
- Status: Operational
- Security class: minimum to maximum
- Capacity: 2,763
- Population: 2,867 (104.8% capacity) (January 31, 2023)
- Opened: 21 June 1941
- Managed by: California Department of Corrections and Rehabilitation
- Warden: Travis Pennington

California Institution for Men (CIM) is a male-only state prison located in the city of Chino, San Bernardino County, California. It is often colloquially referenced as "Chino". In turn, locals call the prison "Chino Men's" or just "Men's" to avoid confusion with the city itself.

== Facilities ==
Location of Chino in San Bernardino county, and San Bernardino County in California

CIM is a 2,500-acre (1,000 ha) facility located east of Los Angeles on arid farmland. Facilities include:

- "The largest Level I inmate population within the California prison system" ("Level I" referring to "open dormitories without a secure perimeter").
- Three Reception Centers (RCs) which "provide short term housing to process, classify and evaluate incoming inmates." Reception Center Central for medium/maximum custody level inmates "receives intake from several southern California counties"; Reception Center East "houses [medium/maximum custody level] Reception Center inmates with sensitive needs, Mental Health inmate/patients requiring an Enhanced Out-Patient level of care and a 100 bed HIV/CID unit"; and Reception Center West is for "medium level custody inmates" who are "waiting processing/transfer to programming institutions."
  - The counties served by Reception Center Central include Orange County, Riverside County, San Diego County and San Bernardino County. It also serves prisoners transferred from the Pitchess Detention Center in Castaic, Los Angeles County.

== Population and staffing ==
As of Fiscal Year 2006/2007, CIM had 2,327 staff and an annual budget of $232.2 million. As of February, 2012 it had a design capacity of 2,976 but a total institution population of 5,266, for an occupancy rate of 177 percent.

As of April 30, 2020, CIM was incarcerating people at 112.8% of its design capacity, with 3,357 occupants.

== History ==
CIM opened in 1941 and "was the first major minimum security institution built and operated in the United States." It was the fourth state prison built in California (after San Quentin State Prison, Folsom State Prison, and the original California Institution for Women at Tehachapi). Since the California Correctional Institution replaced the original California Institution for Women at Tehachapi, CIM is now the third-oldest California state prison.

In 1970, a commercial diver training program started at CIM. In following years, the program's graduates had much success in finding jobs after release from prison and a recidivism rate of only 12 percent. The program was "closed in 2003 due to budget constraints," but reopened in 2006.

Inmate Kevin Cooper escaped from CIM in 1983. In retrospect, factors that may have contributed to the escape included conviction "under an alias," an undetected "history of escaping from jails and mental hospitals," and "a hole in a fence" surrounding CIM. Three days after Cooper's escape, four people were found dead in nearby Chino Hills, and Cooper was later convicted of murdering them. However, there have been doubts raised as to Cooper's guilt over the years. Although DNA evidence obtained through Governor Newsom’s investigation has proven Cooper was responsible. DA Press Release

In 1987, officials of the city of Chino opposed a plan to build a ward at CIM for inmates with HIV/AIDS because they "believe[d] it would threaten the community." After "Corrections Department officials announced they wouldn't increase the AIDS inmate population to more than 200 men," opposition decreased. The ward was constructed and received its first patients in May 1988, making it the second such AIDS ward in California (following one opened in 1984 at the California Medical Facility).

Shayne Allyn Ziska was a correctional officer at CIM "from January 1984 through October 2000." In 2004 he was arrested for helping the Nazi Lowriders (a white supremacist organization) "distribute drugs and assault inmates" inside CIM. In 2006, Ziska was convicted "on charges of conspiracy, civil-rights violations and violent crime in aid of racketeering" and sentenced to 17 years and was released in 2021.

Correctional Officer Manuel A. Gonzalez Jr. was stabbed to death in CIM in 2005. Factors that may have contributed to the killing were prison overcrowding, understaffing, a failure to segregate the inmate in question due to a history of violent behavior, the inmate's lengthy stay at CIM, the inmate's access to a weapon, and the officer's lack of a protective vest. In the aftermath of the Gonzalez murder, CIM instituted reforms. The California Department of Corrections and Rehabilitation in July 2007 agreed to pay $1.2 million to settle a lawsuit by Gonzalez's family.

In 2005 and 2007, the state of California proposed building hundreds of new units for mentally ill inmates at CIM and at the nearby California Institution for Women; local officials opposed such plans. A "general acute-care hospital at CIM" had received a license to operate in 1984, but in March 2006 the hospital operating room was closed and in July 2007 the plan was "to relinquish the license" because the facility was not functioning as a hospital.

On August 8, 2009, a prison riot broke out at CIM during which over 250 inmates were injured, and which ultimately took more than twelve hours to put down. The cause of the riot is under investigation. The riot broke out at 8:20 p.m. Although other races were involved the riot was mainly between Hispanic inmates and African American inmates. The prison's damages were severe, bathroom sinks ripped off the walls, fires broke out, and 50 inmates were taken to nearby hospitals. The riot caused a lockdown of the prison and six others in the area.

In February 2010, the youth facility Heman G. Stark Youth Correctional Facility was closed. California authorities indicated they would incorporate the facility into CIM. As of 2017, it remains empty except for an apartment-style housing unit for CDCR employees.

In August 2020, CIM's role as a reception center ended, and it was one of three former reception centers in California that were reclassified.

== Coronavirus outbreak ==
As of December 4, 2020 it was reported that the COVID-19 virus had killed 27 inmates at CIM, and the virus had infected 172 staff with 789 recovered cases 18 active cases and 1036 inmates had been infected and had since recovered.

== Notable people ==
=== Inmates ===
- Randy Kraft- Serial killer known as the Freeway Killer, sentenced to death in 1989 for the murders of 16 young men. Transferred from San Quentin State Prison to CIM due to the abolishment of death row.
- Kassim Alhimidi, convicted of murdering his wife.
- Rodney Alcala, Serial killer known as the Dating Game Killer. Spent time here for parole violation and providing drugs to a minor in 1974 before being moved to California Men's Colony.
- Robert Biehler (1934–1993), serial killer; sentenced for several crimes before being released in 1966
- Seth Binzer (1974–2024), musician better known as "Shifty Shellshock"; sentenced for 3 months for attempted robbery and for selling and using drugs
- Frank Bompensiero (1905–1977), mobster and hitman, longtime caporegime in the Los Angeles crime family; sentenced for bribery and conspiracy
- Rodolfo Cadena (1943–1972), mobster, prominent figure in the Mexican Mafia; was murdered in CIM
- Steven David Catlin (born 1944), serial killer; sentenced to 3 years for credit card theft
- Caryl Chessman (1921–1960), robber, kidnapper, and rapist; was sentenced for robbery; escaped in 1943
- Kevin Cooper (born 1958), mass murderer; was sentenced for two burglaries under a false name; escaped in 1983
- Geza de Kaplany (born 1926), physician convicted of killing his wife; paroled in 1976
- Bobby Driscoll (1937–1968), actor; held in CIM's Narcotic Rehabilitation Center after being arrested as a drug user
- Maurice Elias (1936–2016), actor better known as "James Stacy"; was sentenced for child molestation and failing to appear in court
- Ray Ferritto (1929–2004), mobster; sentenced for robbery with explosives. He served as an associate and hitman for the Cleveland crime family and Los Angeles crime family
- Alex Peter García (born 1961), heavyweight boxer; sentenced to several prisons for manslaughter, including CIM
- Santiago Garcia Gutierrez (Born 1968) assisted Armenian mafia leader Lev Derman, Mormon Brothers, Jacob and Isaiah Kingston. Convicted of the largest fraud of $2 billion against the United States government. Santiago Garcia Gutierrez assisted by Chinese girlfriend Jordan Fujiko Louie of Salt Lake City of money laundering, wire fraud and other fraudulent activity across multiple states.
- Timothy Joseph McGhee (born 1973), serial killer and Toonerville Rifa 13 gang member; sentenced for parole violation
- Joseph Međugorac (1929–1993), mobster known as "Joe "Peg Leg" Morgan", member of the Mexican Mafia
- Roman Polanski (born 1933), actor and director; held for a 90-day psychiatric evaluation after being arrested for rape and sexual assault of a minor
- Michael Rizzitello (1927–2005), mobster and high ranking member of the Los Angeles crime family
- Peter Robbins (1956–2022), actor; sentenced for sending threatening letters
- Thomas D. Shepard (1925–2012), politician; sentenced for bribery and conspiracy; served 15 months
- Glen Sherley (1936–1978), imprisoned at several facilities for numerous crimes, including CIM
- Craig V. Smith (1945–2012), musician; sentenced for assaulting his mother; was sent to several prisons, including CIM, before being released in 1976
- Charles Andrew Williams (born 1986), perpetrator of the 2001 Santana High School shooting
- Victor Lawrence Paleologus - Murdered Kristi Johnson.
- Bryan Oliver (born 1996), perpetrator of the 2013 Taft Union High School shooting.

=== Staff ===
- Michael J. Hill (1949–2023), director; worked as a guard
- Michael Lent, writer and producer; taught writing at CIM

== References in popular culture ==
- The prison is referenced in the movie Heat when Charlene is told by Sergeant Drucker that her son will end up in Chino if she does not cooperate.
- The 1966 novel Hard Rain Falling is partially set in Chino when the main character Jack Levitt is sent there after being convicted of kidnapping.
- The prison is seen in season 2 of The O.C. when Ryan's brother Trey is released from custody to Ryan's newly adoptive father, Sandy Cohen.
- The prison is a setting in Season 4 of Veronica Mars. Many past characters from the show are incarcerated there
- The prison is a major setting in American History X, as Derek Vinyard's personality changes as a result of enduring the prison culture and prison rape during a manslaughter sentence.
- The 1955 film Unchained was filmed at CIM and included footage of actual inmates. It concerned reform warden Kenyon Scudder and represented his successful attempts to rehabilitate prisoners. The film is most famous for the song Unchained Melody.
- In the 1998 film The Big Lebowski, the character of Jesus Quintana was said to have served six months at Chino for exposing himself to an eight year old.
- On the crime drama Numb3rs, suspects are often mentioned to have done time at Chino and met criminal associates there. In the episode "Sneakerhead", a suspect is threatened with incarceration in his home country, which "makes Chino look like Chuck E. Cheese".
- The song "Murder Was the Case" by Snoop Dogg includes the lyrics "No more indo, gin and juice, I'm on my way to Chino, rollin on the grey goose"
- In the film 2 Fast 2 Furious Brian O'conner references taking his chances in Chino, as opposed to going undercover with agent Dunn.
- The film Shot Caller initially is set in Chino.
- In the TV series Sons of Anarchy, many characters served time in Chino, including Opie Winston, Marcus Alvarez, Ernest Darby, and Nero Padilla.
- In Thomas Harris's 1981 Red Dragon, protagonist Will Graham interviews a murder victim's son who served time at "Chino".
