= Evelina Fernandez =

American dramatist

Evelina Fernández
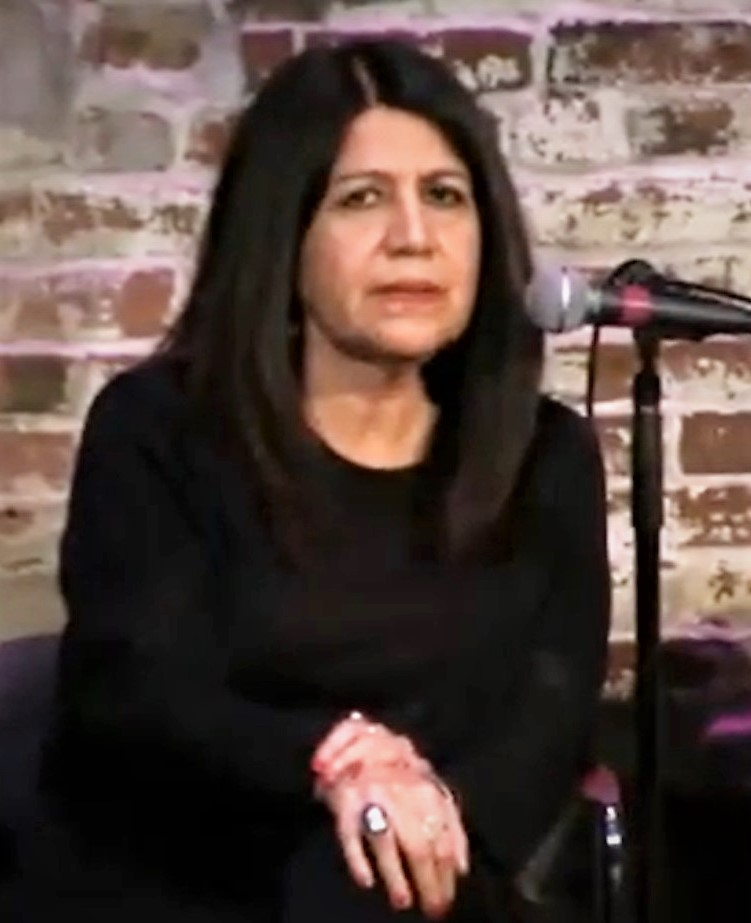
- Fernández speaks in 2016
- Born: Los Angeles, California, United States
- Occupations: Actress, playwright, screenwriter
- Years active: 1987-present

Evelina Fernández is an American playwright and actress from Los Angeles.

== Early life and education ==
Fernández is a second generation Mexican-American. Fernández's grandparents immigrated to the United States in 1910 from Jalisco, to escape the Mexican Revolution. Fernández was born in Los Angeles but lived the first nine years of her life in Arizona before returning to live with her grandparents after her parents got divorced.

Fernández first got involved in drama in the Garfield High School Drama Club. She then attended California State University, Los Angeles, where she continued to pursue theater and became involved in the Chicano Movement. Evelina was a founding member of the Latino Theatre Company (LTC) in 1985. She has remained involved for 30 years, writing several and performing in a dozen plays for the LTC. The LTC currently has a 20-year lease with the City of Los Angeles to operate in the Los Angeles Theater Center (LATC).

== Career ==
Her first prominent role as an actress came in Luis Valdez's Zootsuit in 1978. The play was the first play with a Chicano to be shown on Broadway however, Fernández was pregnant with her first child, Fidel, and could not perform in the Broadway production. After Zootsuit, Fernández performed for El Teatro de Esperanza, performing at both the New York Shakespeare Festival and the Denver Center for the Performing Arts. Fernández then performed as Julie in American Me, a film about Chicano gang life and the prison system in the United States. She has since appeared as an actress in 28 movies, shows and film shorts.

A theme of her work is to fight the common representation of Latino/a characters as victims. Her frustration with the portrayal of Latino/a characters prompted her to write the screenplay for the film Luminarias, released in May 2000. Luminarias is a commentary about race, sex and love from the perspective of single, Chicana women. In addition to writing Luminarias, Fernández also produced and starred in the film as the actress of one of the protagonists, Andrea.

Fernández wrote a loosely autobiographical trilogy called A Mexican Trilogy, which were put on at the LATC by the LTC. The Trilogy is made up of Faith, Hope and Charity. The titles were intended to be the names of the protagonists but in the end, were the themes of each of the play.

== Awards ==
Fernández has received several awards for her work. In 1998, she won the American Latino Media Arts Award for her work in the movie Hollywood Confidential. In 2007 she was nominated for the Humanitas Prize for her work on an episode of the T.V. series Maya and Miguel. In 2000, the year that Luminarias was released, Fernández won the Nosotros Golden Eagle Awards for Outstanding Writer. Two of her works, Solitude and Dementia have made the Los Angeles Times Critic's Choice list. Evelina has received two Ted Schmitt Awards from The Los Angeles Drama Critics Circle for A Mexican Trilogy: An American Story and The Mother of Henry.

== Personal life ==
Fernandez is married to the artistic director and one of the founders of the Latino Theater Company, Jose Luis Valenzuela. Jose has directed many of the plays that Evelina has written and starred in. Valenzuela and Fernández have two children and live in Los Angeles.

== Filmography ==
=== Acting ===
==== Film ====
Year	Title	Role	Notes
1989	Danger Zone II: Reaper's Revenge	La Zona Rosa Hostess	
1990	Flatliners	Latin Woman	
1990	Postcards from the Edge	Airline Employee	
1992	American Me	Julie	
1994	A Million to Juan	Mrs. Gonzales	
1999	Luminarias	Andrea	
2001	Gabriela	Sofia	
2008	Moe	Raquel	
2013	Go for Sisters	Ynez	
2020	Going Rogue	Christina Rivera	

==== Television ====
Year	Title	Role	Notes
1987	Hill Street Blues	Woman	Episode: "Sorry Wrong Number"
1988	Aaron's Way	—N/a	Episode: "A Healing Power"
1988	Run Till You Fall	Evelina	Television film
1988–1989	Roseanne	Juanita Herrera	9 episodes
1990	Alien Nation	Female Executive	Episode: "Eyewitness News"
1990	Knots Landing	Dr. Carroll	2 episodes
1990	Parker Lewis Can't Lose	Registrar	Episode: "Pilot"
1990	The New Adam 12	Mrs. Martinez	Episode: "A Gang of Two"
1992	The Larry Sanders Show	Julie	Episode: "The New Producer"
1997	Hollywood Confidential	Mrs. Navarro	Television film
1997	Sparks	Alonzo's Bride	Episode: "A Bride for Alonzo"
1999	Women: Stories of Passion	Rosie	Episode: "Angel from the Sky"
1999–2001	Judging Amy	Lana Reyes	3 episodes
2000	City of Angels	Nurse Celia	2 episodes
2002	The Brothers García	Mrs. Rizzo	Episode: "School Daze"
2013	NCIS: Los Angeles	Guadalupe	Episode: "Drive"
2020	The Conners	Juanita	2 episodes

=== Writing ===
==== Film ====
Year	Title	Notes
1999	Luminarias	Also actor and producer
2008	Moe	Also actor

==== Television ====
Year	Title	Notes
2004	Maya & Miguel	Episode: "The Letter"
2014–2015	East Los High	14 episodes
