= Yang Fuqing (scientist) =

Chinese mathematician and computer scientist

- 杨芙清
- Born: 6 November 1932 (age 93); Wuxi, Jiangsu, China
- Education: Peking University
- Spouse: Wang Yangyuan
- Children: 2
- Scientific career
- Fields: Software
- Workplaces: Peking University
- Academic advisors: Xu Xianyu; Mikhail Romonovic Shulabola

Chinese name
- Simplified Chinese: 杨芙清
- Traditional Chinese: 楊芙清
Transcriptions
Standard Mandarin
- Hanyu Pinyin: Yáng Fúqīng

Yang Fuqing (born 6 November 1932) is a Chinese computer software expert who is a professor at the School of Information Science and Technology, Peking University, a member of the Chinese Academy of Sciences, and currently chairwoman of the university's School of Software and Microelectronics and director of National Engineering Research Center of Software Engineering.

== Biography ==
Yang was born in Wuxi, Jiangsu, on 6 November 1932, to Yang Jiechen (杨介辰), a businessman, and Li Wenying (李文英). Her last name "Fuqing" means lotus in Chinese. In 1945, she attended the Wuxi No.1 Girls' Middle School, where she was fascinated by mathematics. In 1949, Wuxi was liberated. One day, Yang and other eight girls took part in a charity performance for poor students organized by the local communist government in the people's theater. After the performance, Yang and the girls became popular amateur dance stars in Wuxi overnight. Since then, dance became her hobby.

In 1951, she was admitted to the Department of Mathematics, Tsinghua University with the highest marks in her school. In 1952, the Chinese Communist Party regrouped China's higher education institutions, she moved to Peking University with her department. Under the supervision of Xu Xianyu, she became the first graduate student majoring in computational mathematics in China. In 1957, China sent a computer delegation to the Soviet Union. As a member of the delegation, Yang first contacted the vacuum tube computer in the computing center of the Academy of Sciences of the Soviet Union and began to learn how to write programs. In 1958, she transferred to the Department of Mathematics and Mechanics, Moscow University and studied programming automation under the guidance of Mikhail Romonovic Shulabola.

Yang returned to China in October 1959 and taught at her alma mater. In 1962, she went to the Soviet Union again and joined the Computing Center of Dubner Institute of Nuclear Physics. In December 1969, she participated in the development of China's first integrated circuit computer DJS11 and was responsible for the design of instruction system and operating system. In 1973, Peking University was invited to participate in the overall design of DJS200/XT2 series computer, she was appointed as a member of the overall design group of the 200 Series Software and the leader of the 240 Computer Software. She became deputy director of the Department of Computer Science and Technology in 1981, and was promoted to director in 1983. In November 1994, Beida Jade Bird Group was officially registered, Yang was made the chairwoman.

== Personal life ==
Yang met Wang Yangyuan in Peking University. They got married in the autumn of 1960. The couple has a son and a daughter.

== Honours and awards ==
- 1991 Member of the Chinese Academy of Sciences (CAS)
- 1997 Science and Technology Progress Award of the Ho Leung Ho Lee Foundation
- 1998 State Science and Technology Progress Award (Second Class)
- 2003 Fellow of the Institute of Electrical and Electronics Engineers (IEEE Fellow)
- 2007 State Science and Technology Progress Award (Second Class)
- 2011 Lifetime Achievement Award of the China Computer Federation
