= Jose Landa-Rodriguez =

Alleged leader of the Mexican Mafia

Jose Landa-Rodriguez, also known as "Fox" and "Fox Tapia", is an alleged leader of the Mexican Mafia who is alleged to have run Mexican Mafia operations from inside Los Angeles County jails from 2012–2016. The alleged actions are purported in a May 2018 federal indictment and by prosecutors to have occurred primarily at the Men's Central Jail, a Los Angeles County Sheriff's Department county jail. It is alleged that Landa-Rodriguez had ordered murders and assaults to occur, for a kidnapping and murder to occur, and that he controlled all drug trafficking in Los Angeles County jails.

In addition to charges accusing Landa-Rodriguez of controlling illegal operations within the Los Angeles County jail system, he has been accused of using his attorney, Gabriel Zendejas-Chavez, to relay messages to Mexican Mafia controlled street gangs known as Sureños. Attorney Gabriel Zendejas-Chavez was arrested on May 23, 2018 in conjunction with the allegations of acting as a messenger, however in a trial in August of 2022, the government failed to convict Chávez when the jury could not reach a verdict. RICO charges were dismissed against Chávez in September of 2024 in exchange for a plea to the charge of Misprision of a Felony. Chávez received no jail time, no probation, no supervision or fines. .

Landa-Rodriguez is originally from the Mexican state Michoacán. Gang experts have described him as "the most powerful and influential inmate in L.A. County Jail". In 2025, he struck a plea deal that after serving 2 more years in prison he would be deported to Mexico.
