= Slobbery Jim =

James "Slobbery Jim" White (c. 1839 - disappeared June, 3, 1859) was a leader of the 1850s New York City gang, the Daybreak Boys, which was formed in the late 1840s in Five Points slum with membership drawn from teenaged Irish immigrants. The gang committed robberies, ship sabotage, and frequent murders along the East River. The Daybreak Boys are believed to have caused the loss of at least $100,000 in property and committed at least twenty murders between 1850 and 1852.

Jim assumed leadership of the gang with Bill Lowrie in 1853 after three of the gang's leaders were arrested after a failed attempt to raid the brig Thomas Watson. However, he had to flee New York City to avoid prosecution for the murder of a fellow Daybreak Boy known as Michael "Patsy the Barber" Dooley on June 3, 1859. According to Herbert Asbury in his colorful book The Gangs of New York, the two had robbed and murdered a newly arrived German immigrant but then the pair got into an altercation at a criminal dive known as the "Hole-in-the-Wall" over the distribution of the twelve cents taken from the victim. Slobbery Jim wanted the biggest share as he had thrown the man into the river while Patsy the Barber wanted an equal share as he had bludgeoned the victim in the first place. Slobbery Jim tried to bite Patsy the Barber's nose off while Patsy the Barber tried to cut Jim's throat. After a lengthy fight, Jim cut Patsy's throat before stomping him to death with his hobnail boots. According to newspaper accounts of the time, however, the stabbing occurred at an unnamed porter house. Additionally, a coroner's inquest found that Patsy the Barber died as a result of a loss of blood from a stab wound received in a fight with the perpetrator inside the house, and that the victim then walked out of the house before collapsing on the sidewalk.
