= Joe "Pegleg" Morgan =

American crime boss (1929–1993)

Joe Morgan
- Born: Joseph Međugorac; 10 April 1929; Los Angeles, California, U.S.
- Died: 8 November 1993 (aged 64); Corcoran, California, U.S.
- Other names: "Pegleg"; "Cocoliso"
- Occupation: Crime boss
- Years active: 1946–1993
- Allegiance: Mexican Mafia

Joseph Morgan (born Joseph Međugorac; April 10, 1929 – November 8, 1993) was a Croatian-American gangster who became the first non-Mexican American member of the Mexican Mafia (La eMe). He received the nickname "Pegleg" by authorities because of his prosthetic leg.

== Early life ==
The youngest of four siblings, Morgan was born on April 10, 1929, in San Pedro, California to Croatian immigrants Clara (née Radišić from Imotski) and Grgo Međugorac, a truck driver who was an ethnic Croat from Ljubuski. Shortly after his birth his father naturalized as a U.S. citizen, anglicizing the family name to Morgan due to anti-immigrant and anti-Slavic sentiment at the time (in 1929, the same year Morgan was born, the U.S. passed immigration laws limiting immigration from the Balkans. It is believed that more than half of the Croatian population in the U.S. at the time was deported from the nation). Morgan grew up in a primarily Mexican and Croatian neighborhood in San Pedro. Later, he was raised by his mother in a Mexican neighborhood in Boyle Heights. In the late 1930s, he joined the Ford MaraVilla street gang, one of the oldest documented gangs in Los Angeles.

Morgan became fluent in Spanish.

== Prison time ==
In 1946, Morgan beat to death the husband of his 32-year-old girlfriend and buried the body in a shallow grave. While awaiting trial, he escaped using the identification papers of a fellow inmate awaiting transfer to a forestry camp. He was recaptured and sentenced to nine years at San Quentin State Prison. He was only seventeen years old at the time.

Morgan was paroled in 1955, but a year later, he returned to prison for an armed robbery at a West Covina bank where he ran off with $17,000 (equivalent to $201,000 in 2025).

In 1961, Morgan led eleven inmates in a jailbreak from Los Angeles County Jail through a pipe shaft and using hacksaw blades he hid in his prosthetic leg.

Morgan was well respected within the ranks of the Mexican Mafia and became a high-ranking member. His connections with cocaine and heroin suppliers in Mexico helped pave the foundation for the Mexican Mafia's narcotics distribution throughout California. Morgan was able to persuade the Aryan Brotherhood to forge a loose alliance with La eMe, due to having the Black Guerrilla Family as a mutual rival. This was after Morgan tried and successfully made loose alliances with black gangs such as the BGF, which eventually broke down because the Mexican leaders at the time had issues with multiple black gangs. It was thought that Morgan wanted to set deals with white and black gangs to ensure La eMe would come out the dominant force with little resistance. Morgan was known for thinking strategically.

Allegedly, Morgan established diplomatic relations with the Los Angeles crime family through Michael Rizzitello, whom he and Rodolfo Cadena met during the nine-year sentence of the reputed mobster in Chino for a string of armed robberies during the 1970s.

Morgan committed the first prison gang street execution in Los Angeles in 1971.

Morgan spent more than seven months in federal prison for arms trafficking from Utah to California. By the mid to late 1970s Morgan was one of the highest ranking Mexican Mafia members in Southern California, and had influence in most of the U.S and even as far as Mexico.

== Death ==
On October 27, 1993, Morgan was diagnosed with inoperable liver cancer while serving a life sentence at California State Prison, Corcoran. His wife requested that he be released on compassionate release, but he died on November 9, before the process began. "When I visited him about six months ago, he appeared to be losing some weight and his color didn't look good, but Joe is a very private person and he didn't complain", said his attorney, Shirley MacDonald, after his death.

== Legacy ==
In 1992, the film American Me was released, which was based on the history of the Mexican Mafia. A principal supporting character is "J.D." (played by William Forsythe), a non-Mexican member who has an artificial leg. Edward James Olmos (the movie's writer/director/star) attempted to visit Morgan in hopes that he would gain his approval for the movie. Morgan refused to see him, and filed a lawsuit against Olmos and Universal Studios claiming inaccuracies in the film. It has been alleged that at least two people were killed on account of Mexican Mafia displeasure with the script, including former Mexican Mafia members and affiliates who had served as advisers during the making of the movie.

At the time of Morgan's death, his wife filed a $500,000 lawsuit against Olmos and the filmmakers, arguing that the film did not request her permission for basing one of the characters on Morgan.
