= Rene Enriquez (mobster) =

American mobster

- Born: July 7, 1962 (age 63); Artesia, California, U.S.
- Other names: Boxer, Rain Man
- Known for: Author of The Black Hand

Rene "Boxer" Enriquez (born July 7, 1962 in Artesia, California) is a Mexican-American former prison gang member and major organized crime figure. His criminal history also includes jailhouse stabbing attacks on other inmates, drug trafficking, extortion, and a sexual assault. He was a high ranking made man in the Mexican Mafia before defecting and becoming a federal witness in 2003. His life is chronicled by journalist Chris Blatchford in the true crime book The Black Hand: The Story of Rene "Boxer" Enriquez, and his life in the Mexican Mafia.

== Early years ==
Enriquez was born to recent immigrants from Mexico and grew up in a middle-class home in Cerritos, California but hung out in Artesia, California. He showed early promise in school, but dropped out of Cerritos High School in the 9th grade. His father tried to teach him how to run the family business, but Enriquez preferred stealing with his friend Johnny Mancillas, who channeled his ambitions into the local street gang Artesia 13/Arta 13.

As a child, Enriquez idolized his older brother Marc, who was already an Artesia 13/Arta 13 gang member. Marc gave Enriquez the nickname "Boxer" and used him to break into neighbors' homes. At age 12, Enriquez was jumped in to his brother's gang. By 13, Enriquez began to drink after a year of smoking marijuana. By this time, he already had encounters with law enforcement for property damage. Within a year, he became a regular user and dealer of PCP (phencyclidine), and later LSD (lysergic acid diethylamide).

In 2015, Enriquez testified that Marc and other members of Artesia 13/Arta 13 savagely beat him up behind a gas station as a gang initiation. Enriquez subsequently went to juvenile hall after he was convicted of armed robbery for several hold ups of convenience stores.

== Criminal career ==
In his late teens, Enriquez was arrested after committing a string of armed robberies and was sentenced for a long period in prison.

At the age of nineteen, Enriquez first encountered the Mexican mafia, or La eMe. While Enriquez was imprisoned at the Deuel Vocational Institution, he acted as a hitman for the Mexican Mafia and stabbed a gang member from Los Angeles, who survived the stabbing. Enriquez later killed an imprisoned Vagos Motorcycle Club member nicknamed "Chainsaw."

In 1985, Enriquez became a full-fledged Carnal (Mexican vernacular Spanish for brother) or made guy in the Mexican Mafia. He projected the Mexican Mafia into a status of unprecedented organizational structure with a base army of approximately 60,000 heavily armed gang members who controlled the prison system and a large part of California crime. He stated, "I believe I'm a cut above the rest. As a mafioso, you have to be an elitist. You have an elitist, arrogant mentality. That's how you carry yourself in the Mexican mafia. That's how you project yourself."

In 1989, Enriquez was released on parole and began extorting street tax from drug dealers and other criminals in the territory the Mexican Mafia had assigned to him. In the process, he committed two murders. He put out a contract on alleged drug dealer Cynthia Gavaldon, whom Enriquez believed was holding back street tax from La Eme. Enriquez also personally murdered fellow Carnal, David Gallegos, who had been greenlit for running from a gunfight. Enriquez personally gave Gallegos an overdose of heroin and then shot him five times in the head.

Enriquez was arrested and charged with Cynthia Galvadon's murder, to which he later pled guilty in return for a life imprisonment, rather than facing the death penalty.

In 1991, Enriquez and another man assaulted Mexican Mafia leader Salvador "Mon" Buenrostro at a lawyers' interview room in the Los Angeles County Jail. They stabbed him 30 times, but Buenrostro survived.

In 1993, the state sent him to Pelican Bay State Prison on California's remote north coast. Since he was a prison gang member, Enriquez was locked in a windowless isolation cell in the Security Housing Unit, or SHU. There inmates spend 23 hours a day alone without seeing the outside world, except during their yard time in which they are transferred to a small cage outside filled with workout equipment. Years later, Enriquez described the SHU:

"What impacts me immediately as soon as I walk in, is the smell. I just stepped outside from the bus and you smell the pines, the redwoods, the forest ... these earthy, loamy smells. But as soon as you step into the SHU, it hits you like a wave. It's the smell of despair, depression, desperation. This is a place where people come to die."

In the mid-1990s, the Mexican Mafia put out calls to stop drive-by shootings among L.A. Latino gangs. But Enriquez says the aim was not peace.

"Our true motivation for stopping the drive-bys was to infiltrate the street gangs and place representatives in each gang, representatives which then, in turn, tax illicit activities in the areas," he said. Enriquez said the Mexican Mafia wanted to channel the random shootings into a form of violence it could control, for profit.

"And we already had it planned out that California would be carved up ... into slices, with each member receiving an organizational turf," he said.

== Defection from Mexican Mafia ==
In 2003, Enriquez left the Mexican Mafia. Since then, he has provided intelligence and other information to help law enforcement, acting as an expert witness in dozens of State murder and Federal racketeering trials and has spoken at a number of conferences and training sessions. In 2014, officials from at least 11 federal and state law enforcement agencies wrote letters to the State Parole Board attesting to his contributions.

According to Enriquez's parole officer, "There is a possibility Rene may get out of prison once his work with the feds are done, however there is also possibility that he may not."

In February 2015, Enriquez told the parole board that if released, he would enter the Federal Government's Witness Protection Program because he remains on the Mexican Mafia's hit list more than a decade after his 2003 cooperation with law enforcement. He would not appear as a registered sex offender in the witness protection program, he said, but added that he would be under stringent monitoring by the U.S. Marshals Service.

"I cannot undo the past. But I can contribute to the future," Enriquez told the parole board. "I can contribute to dissuading other individuals from participating in this."

California Governor Jerry Brown blocked Enriquez's release, writing, "Because he is a high-profile drop out targeted by the Mexican Mafia, Mr. Enriquez's parole poses a serious security risk to him, his family, his parole agents, and the community in which he is placed."

On November 2, 2017 Governor Brown denied parole for Enriquez, making it the third time he has been denied by the governor.

In April 2019, Enriquez was again denied parole, by California Governor Gavin Newsom. Although he again expressed remorse for his criminal past and a desire to change, the family of Cynthia Gavaldon also testified before the parole board, disputing Enriquez's allegations that she was a drug dealer and questioning the sincerity of Enriquez's decision to break with the Mexican Mafia.

In July 2022, Enriquez was granted parole.
