= List of gangs in the United States =

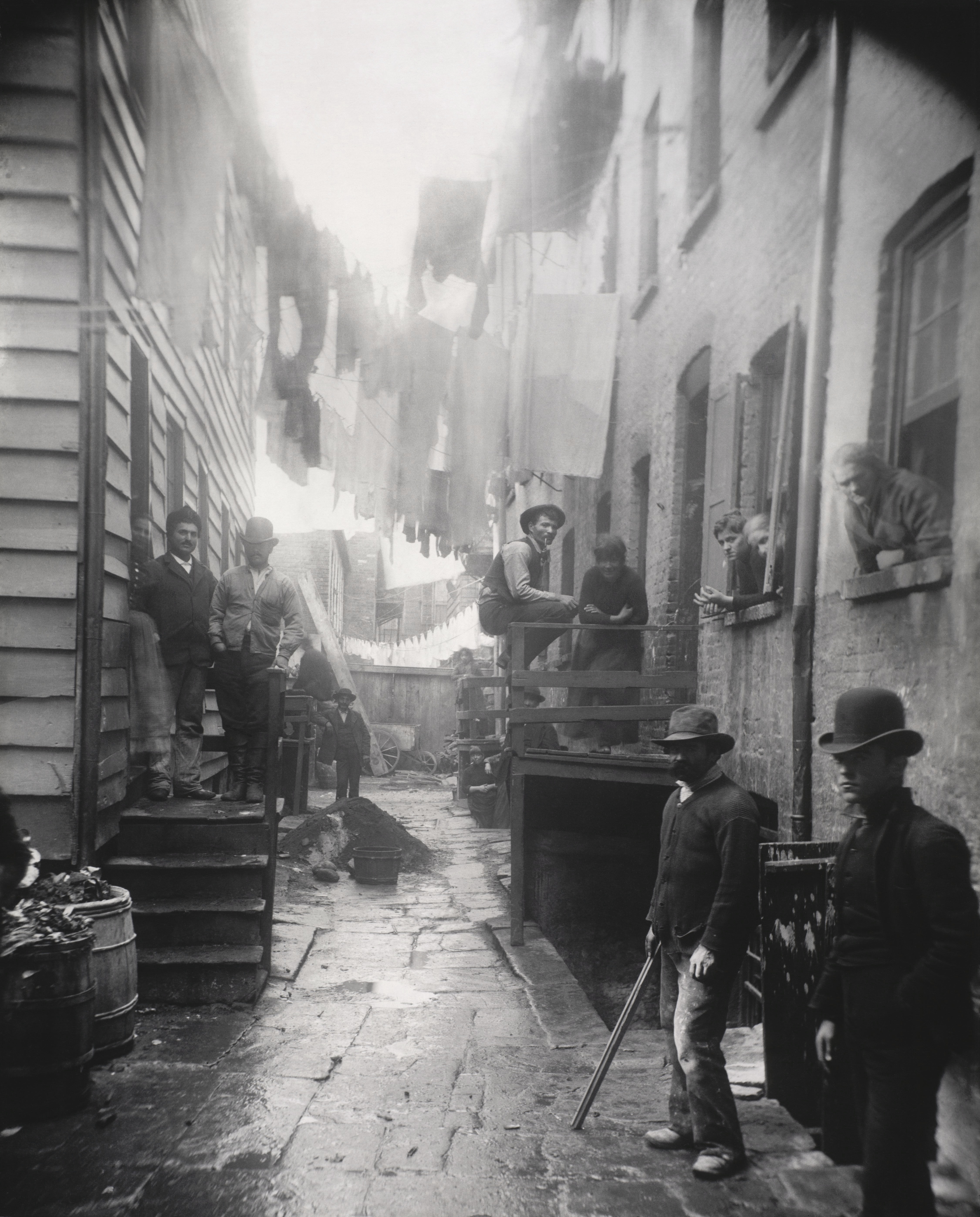
The Five Points, Manhattan is a location that was associated with gang activities from the early 19th century.

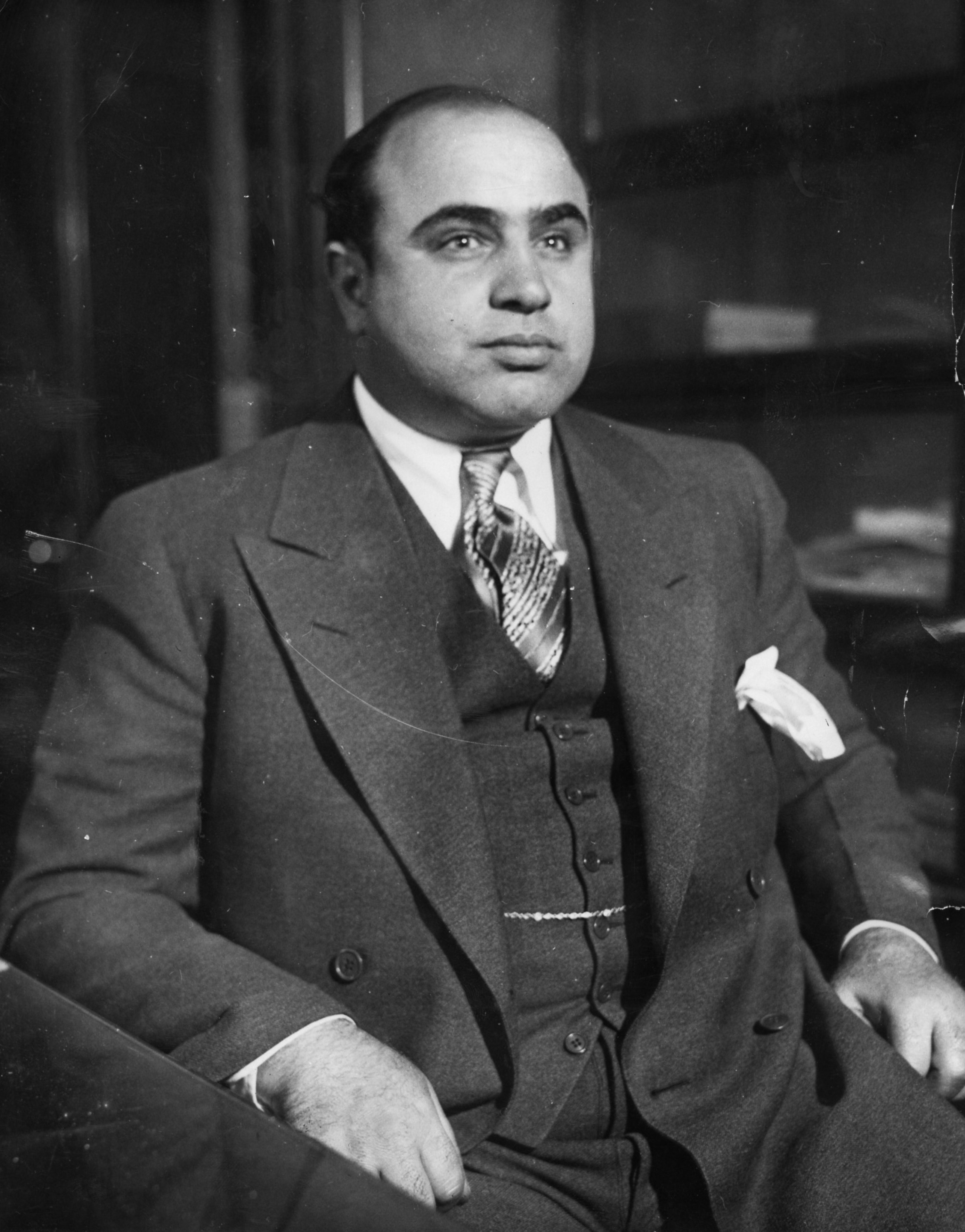
In the late 1920s, Al Capone was the leader of the Chicago Outfit

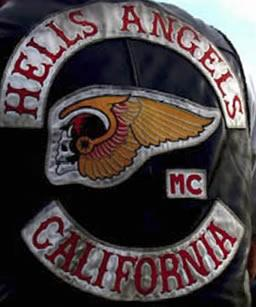
The Hells Angels outlaw motorcycle club was founded in 1948 and is considered a criminal gang by American law enforcement agencies, particularly for their involvement in drug-related activities and violent crimes.

The Federal Bureau of Investigation website in 2014 stated that there were some 33,000 gangs in the United States which they classified as street gangs, motorcycle gangs or prison gangs. While some gangs are multi-ethnic, many criminal enterprises are organized along racial lines and restrict membership to individuals of particular ethnicities or races.

Notable criminal gangs include:

== By ethnic origin ==
=== African-American ===
- 31 Gang
- Almighty Black P. Stone Nation
- Almighty Vice Lord Nation
  - Four Corner Hustlers
- Bailey Boys
- Black Disciples
- Black Guerrilla Family
- Black Mafia
- Black Mafia Family
- Black Spades
- Bloods
  - Black P. Stones
  - Bounty Hunter Bloods
  - Crenshaw Mafia
  - Nine Trey Gangsters
  - Pirus
  - Sex Money Murda
  - United Blood Nation
- CBL/BFL
- Chambers Brothers
- Columbia Point Dawgs
- The Council
- Crips
  - Grape Street Watts Crips
  - Rollin' 30s Harlem Crips
  - Rollin' 60s Neighborhood Crips
  - Venice Shoreline Crips
- D.C. Blacks
- Decepticons
- Errol Flynns
- The Family
- Folk Nation
- Fruit Belt Gang
- Gangster Disciples
  - OutLaw Gangster Disciples
- Hidden Valley Kings
- KUMI 415
- LRGP
- Lucerne Street Doggz
- Miami Boys
- Mickey Cobras
- Orchard Park Trailblazers
- Savage Nomads
- Savage Skulls
- Schuele Boys
- Somali Outlaws
- Supreme Team
- Westmob
- Young Boys Inc.

=== Caribbean ===
- Jamaican posse
  - Shower Posse
  - Yardies
- Zoe Pound
- Rasta City
- Bloods
- Crips

=== Caucasian ===
- 311 Boyz
- American Front (white supremacist)
- Aryan Nations (white supremacist)
- Aryan Republican Army (white supremacist)
- Chicago Gaylords
- Combat 18 (white supremacist)
- Dead Man Incorporated
- Dixie Mafia
- Friends Stand United
- Hammerskins (white supremacist)
- Imperial Klans of America (white supremacist)
- Keystone State Skinheads (white nationalist)
- Ku Klux Klan (white supremacist)
- The Order (white supremacist)
- Peckerwood
  - 211 Crew (white supremacist)
  - Aryan Brotherhood (white supremacist)
  - Aryan Brotherhood of Texas (white supremacist)
  - Aryan Circle (white supremacist)
  - European Kindred (white supremacist)
  - Nazi Lowriders (white supremacist)
  - Public Enemy No.1 (white supremacist)
- People Nation
- Popes
- Simon City Royals
- State Line Mob
- Volksfront (white supremacist)
- White Aryan Resistance (white supremacist)

=== East Asian ===
- Chung Ching Yee, Chinese
- Fullerton Boys, Korean
- Kkangpae, Korean
- Snakehead, Chinese
- Tong, Chinese
  - Bing Kong Tong
  - Hip Sing Association
  - Hop Sing Tong
  - On Leong Chinese Merchants Association
  - Suey Sing Association
- Triad
  - 14K Triad, Chinese
  - Bamboo Union, Taiwanese
  - Big Circle Gang, Chinese, Vietnamese, and Cambodian
  - Black Dragons, Chinese and Vietnamese
  - Flying Dragons, Chinese and Vietnamese
  - Four Seas Gang, Taiwanese
  - Ghost Shadows, Chinese and Vietnamese
  - Jackson Street Boys, Cantonese and Vietnamese
  - Ping On, Chinese
  - Sun Yee On, Chinese
  - Wah Ching, Chinese
  - Wo Hop To, Hong Kong
  - Wo Shing Wo, Hong Kong
- Wah Kee, Chinese and Malaysian
- Yakuza, Japanese
  - Inagawa-kai
  - Yamaguchi-gumi

=== Eastern European ===
- Albanian mafia
  - Albanian Boys
  - Rudaj Organization
- Bosnian mafia
- Brothers' Circle
- Greek mafia
  - Philadelphia Greek Mob
  - Velentzas crime family
- Polish mob
- Romanian mafia
- Russian mafia
  - Solntsevskaya Bratva
- Serbian mafia
- Ukrainian mafia

=== European American ===
- Bowery Boys (gang)

=== Hispanic ===
- 10th Street Gang
- 18th Street gang
- 7th Street Gang
- Almighty Saints
- Barrio Azteca
- Cali Cartel
- Dominicans Don't Play
- Folk Nation
- Fresno Bulldogs
- Ghetto Brothers
- Gulf Cartel
- Hermanos de Pistoleros Latinos
- Imperial Gangsters
- Jalisco New Generation Cartel
- Jheri Curls
- Juárez Cartel
- La Familia Michoacana
- La Línea
- La Raza Nation
- Latin Counts
- Latin Eagles
- Latin Kings
- Lopers
- Los Mexicles
- Los Solidos
- Los Zetas
- Maniac Latin Disciples
- Marielitos
- Medellín Cartel
- Mexican Mafia
- Mexikanemi
- MS-13 (Mara Salvatrucha)
- Ñetas
- Norteños
- Nuestra Familia
- People Nation
- Puro Tango Blast
- Savage Nomads
- Savage Skulls
- Sinaloa Cartel
  - Beltrán-Leyva Cartel
- Spanish Cobras
- Spanish Gangster Disciples
- Sureños
  - 38th Street gang
  - The Avenues
  - Forming Kaos
  - Azusa 13
  - Culver City Boys 13
  - El Monte Flores 13
  - Florencia 13
  - Logan Heights Gang
  - OVS
  - Playboys
  - Puente 13
  - Santa Monica 13
  - Temple Street
  - Toonerville Rifa 13
  - Varrio Nuevo Estrada
  - Venice 13
  - Westside Locos 13
  - White Fence
- Texas Syndicate
- Tijuana Cartel
- Tren de Aragua
- Trinitario
- Vatos Locos

=== Irish-American ===
- Charlestown Mob
- Dead Rabbits
- Five Points Gang
- Gustin Gang
- Hogan Gang
- Irish Mob
- K&A Gang
- Killeen Gang
- Mullen Gang
- North Side Gang
- Ragen's Colts
- Roach Guards
- Shirt Tails
- Valley Gang
- Westies
- White Hand Gang
- Whyos
- Winter Hill Gang

=== Italian-American ===
- 10th and Oregon Crew
- American Mafia
  - The Commission
  - Five Families
    - Bonanno crime family
    - Colombo crime family
    - Gambino crime family
      - Baltimore Crew
      - Ozone Park Boys
    - Genovese crime family
      - 116th Street Crew
      - Greenwich Village Crew
    - Lucchese crime family
      - Lucchese crime family New Jersey faction
      - The Tanglewood Boys
      - The Vario Crew
  - Bufalino crime family
  - Buffalo crime family
  - Chicago Outfit
  - Cleveland crime family
  - Dallas crime family
  - DeCavalcante crime family
  - Denver crime family
  - Detroit Partnership
  - East Harlem Purple Gang
  - Genna crime family
  - Houston crime family
  - Kansas City crime family
  - Los Angeles crime family
  - Magaddino crime family
  - Milwaukee crime family
  - Morello crime family
  - Murder, Inc.
  - New Orleans crime family
  - Patriarca crime family
  - Philadelphia crime family
  - Pittsburgh crime family
  - Rochester crime family
  - San Francisco crime family
  - San Jose crime family
  - Seattle crime family
  - St. Louis crime family
  - Trafficante crime family
- Camorra
- The Combined
- Corsican mafia
  - Unione Corse
- Five Points Gang
- Forty-Two Gang
- Jousters
- National Crime Syndicate
- 'Ndrangheta
- Sacra Corona Unita
- Sicilian Mafia
- South Brooklyn Boys

=== Jewish ===
- Jewish mafia
  - The Bugs and Meyer Mob
  - Mickey Cohen gang
  - Murder, Inc.
- New York divorce coercion gang
- The Purple Gang
- Yiddish Black Hand

=== Indigenous American ===
- Native Mob
- Red Skin Kingz

=== Pacific Islanders ===
- The Company
- Sons of Samoa
- Tongan Crip Gang

=== Southeast Asian ===
- Asian Boyz, Southeast Asian (mostly Cambodian)
- Bahala Na Gang, Filipino
- Born to Kill, Vietnamese
- Menace of Destruction, Hmong
- Satanas, Filipino
- Tiny Rascal Gang, Southeast Asian (mostly Cambodian)

=== South Asian ===
- Indian Mafia
- Pakistani mafia

=== West Asian ===
- Armenian Power
- Chaldean mafia
- Israeli mafia
  - Abergil crime family
- TAP Boyz
- Turkish mafia

== Outlaw motorcycle clubs ==
- Bandidos
- Breed
- Brother Speed
- Chosen Few
- Coffin Cheaters
- Devils Diciples
- Diablos
- El Forastero
- Free Souls
- Galloping Goose
- Gypsy Jokers
- Hells Angels
- Hell's Lovers
- Highwaymen
- Iron Horsemen
- Market Street Commandos
- Mongols
- No Surrender
- Outlaws
- Pagans
- Pissed Off Bastards of Bloomington
- Rock Machine
- Sons of Satan
- Sons of Silence
- Vagos
- Warlocks (Florida)
- Warlocks (Pennsylvania)

== Prison ==
Membership in this group may overlap other groups above.

- 211 Crew
- Almighty Vice Lord Nation
- Aryan Brotherhood
- Aryan Brotherhood of Texas
- Aryan Circle
- Asian Boyz
- Barrio Azteca
- Black Guerrilla Family
- Dominicans Don't Play
- Bloods
- Crips
- D.C. Blacks
- Dead Man Incorporated
- European Kindred
- Folk Nation
- Hermanos de Pistoleros Latinos
- KUMI 415
- Latin Kings
- Mexican Mafia
- Mexikanemi
- MS-13
- Nazi Lowriders
- Ñetas
- New Mexican Mafia
- Nuestra Familia
- People Nation
- Public Enemy No. 1
- Puro Tango Blast
- Texas Syndicate
- Tiny Rascal Gang
- Trinitario
- United Blood Nation
- Wah Ching
- Zoe Pound

== See also ==
- List of criminal gangs in Los Angeles
- List of California street gangs
- Crime in the United States
