= James Edwin Richards =

American journalist

- Born: ca. 1945
- Died: October 18, 2000 (aged 55); Venice, California, United States
- Cause of death: Gunshot wounds
- Education: Ohio State University, BA; UC Berkeley, MBA
- Occupations: Citizen journalist, editor and publisher House painter, property manager and real estate agent
- Organization(s): Venice-area Model Neighborhood Program; Neighborhood Watch; Community Police Advisory Board
- Known for: Neighborhood News (weekly)
- Style: Crime reports
- Partner: Cynthia Jean Moore

James Edwin Richards, also known as Jim Richards, (ca.1945 – 18 October 2000), was an American citizen journalist, editor and publisher of Neighborhood News, a weekly e-mail newsletter, that reported on crime in Venice, California. Richards was murdered at his Oakwood neighborhood home, one convicted assailant was sentenced to 16 years in prison, and the anniversary of his death is honored by locals.

== Personal ==
James Edwin Richards was 55 years old at the time of his murder. He had lived at 546 Vernon Avenue for 20 years and in Venice since 1969. Richards was known in his community as a local anti-crime activist, block captain for the Model Neighborhood Program, and a member of the Community Police Advisory Board. His hometown was Dayton, Ohio. After attending Catholic schools in Dayton, he went on to earn his BA degree from Ohio State University. He then studied at UC Berkeley and graduated with a master's degree in business. Before turning to citizen journalism, Richards had established himself as a house painter, property manager, and real estate agent.

His memorial service was held at Church of St. Mark, Oakwood. Richards was survived by his older sister Rita, his companion Cynthia Jean Moore and her two children.

== Citizen journalism ==
Richards reported on criminal activity in the Oakwood neighborhood for around three years and was known by residents to be a "controversial" figure.

As part of his activism against crime, Jim Richards became a citizen journalist focusing on local crime, and he edited and published an Oakwood neighborhood e-mail newsletter, which he published from his home in Venice, California. Richards was known for reporting what he had heard on crime scanners, visiting crime scenes—often arriving first—and investigating criminals and even photographing drug deals for Neighborhood News. The Neighborhood News published a listing of crimes, such as shootings, drug sales, thefts, and vandalism.

== Death ==
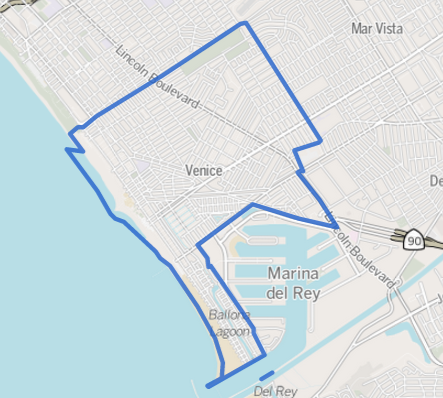
Oakwood is a neighborhood located in Venice, California.

James Edwin Richards was known as a "controversial" figure in the community, according to Ruth Galanter, a Venice city councilwoman. She called Richards' killing "a straightforward assassination." Galanter said Richards' stance and activism against crime had made him a highly visible obstacle to crime elements and attracted many enemies as a result.

Police believed that two assailants murdered Jim Richards. Police said his murderers waited for him and shot him several times in his driveway after he returned home in his camper van from a workout at an all-night gym around 4:15 a.m.

== Legal investigation and prosecution ==
Police carried out an investigation into Richards' premeditated murder. Initially, police said they did not have any leads and the Los Angeles City Council established a $25,000 reward.

Police investigated a conspiracy to kill Richards. A man was sentenced on 24 February 2003 to 25 years in prison for his role in a national cocaine ring, and it was also believed that he and others were linked to the slaying of James Richards. Richards kept tabs on the crime activity in his neighborhood and police believed others had conspired to kill him. It was alleged that Richards was killed because the people in the crime ring thought he was giving police information about their operations. The indictment indicated that Richards murder and the attempted murder of an unidentified man were meant to further the individuals criminal enterprise.

There was also a conviction in another case against a person believed to be the only surviving assailant. Byron Lopez, a.k.a. "Crook", who was arrested 26 February 2002 and later pleaded guilty and did not contest the pre-meditated murder charges brought against him. He was sentenced to 16 years in prison.

== Context ==
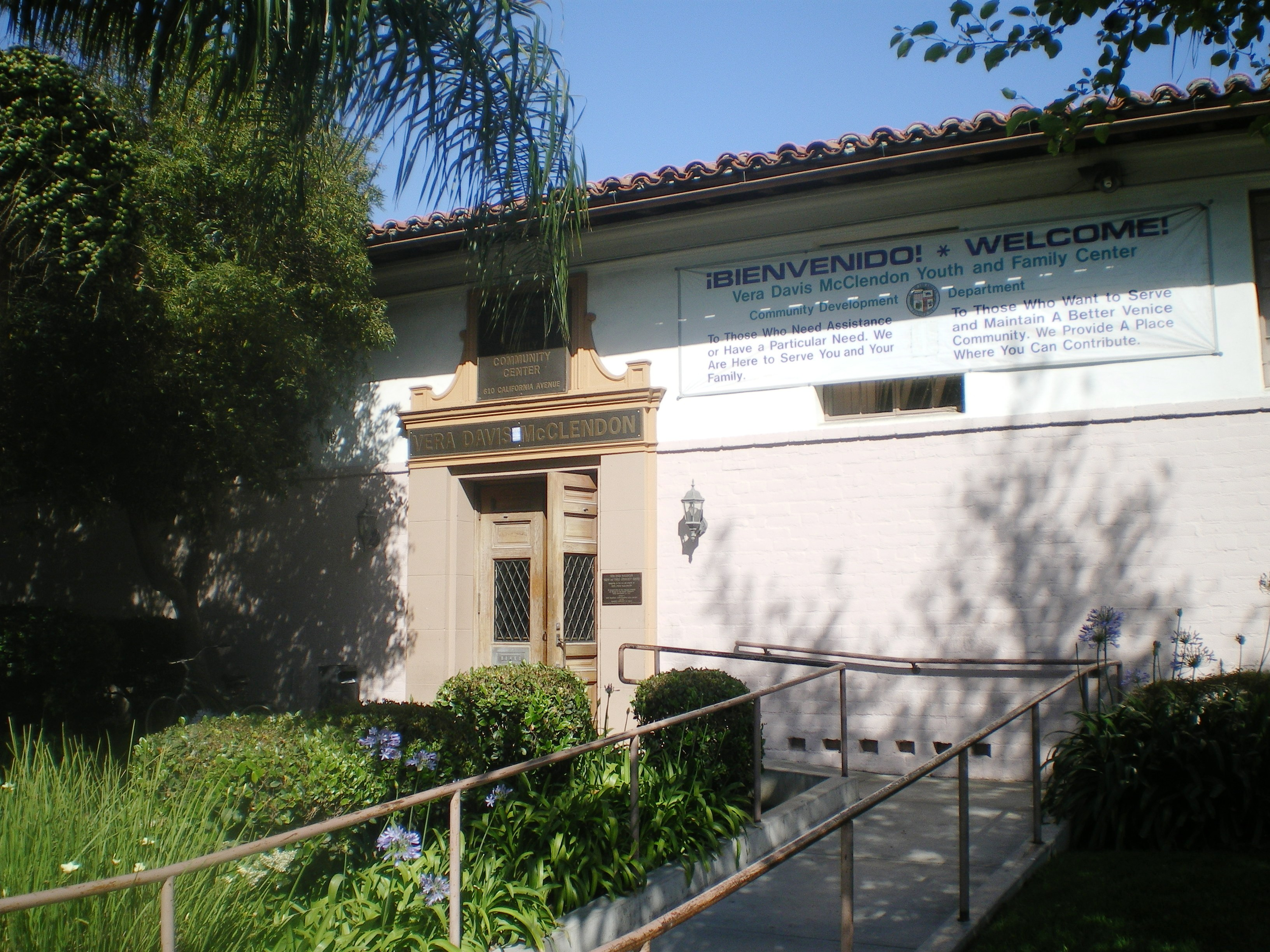
The Vera Davis McClendon Youth & Family Center is a local public meeting place for Oakwood neighborhood activists and residents, located in Venice, California.

Venice, California had experienced a wave of gang-related violence during the 1990s, especially from 1994 to 1997, and experienced a resurgence prior to Richards' murder. In response, police, under the leadership of LAPD Chief of Police Bernard C. Parks, established a Model Neighborhood Program that placed more police in the neighborhoods who were regular patrolling within a zone while at the same time the city of Venice, according to advocate councilwoman Ruth Galanter, would use city resources to clean up vandalism and involve citizens. Richards' Oakwood neighborhood is located in Venice, California and is about 12 city square blocks in size.

== Impact ==
The city of Venice designated 18 October, the anniversary of Richards' murder, as "Jim Richards Day", which has been observed since 2008.

== Reactions ==
As the investigation began, L.A. Police Lt. Horace Frank said, "people ought to be outraged by every murder. We're outraged by every murder and will pursue every murder aggressively."

In reaction to Richards' murder, Venice residents spoke of a climate of fear that was settling in as a result of the violence.

Ruth Galanter, a Venice councilwoman representing Oakwood, said, "It is a heinous act meant to intimidate the community and threaten residents into staying quiet in the face of a criminal takeover of their community by gang members and drug dealers."

Vanessa Celentano, Jim Richards' neighbor, said, "People are going to be more worried now than ever. The fact that the block captain got shot to death, I mean, where does that leave us? It's scary."

Resident Patt Morrison wrote about the intimidation that neighbors in Oakwood felt about talking about Richards' murder, the complacency of residents about the neighborhood's problems, and the admiration for Richards' activism in an atmosphere of fear.

In the 2008 proposal to create a day of commemoration, Galanter said, "Jim was a brave and dedicated man. The city and the community owe a debt of gratitude to him. Those who believe they can intimidate this community have sorely underestimated the good people of Oakwood."

== See also ==
- List of journalists killed in the United States
- Venice Shoreline Crips
- Venice 13
- Culver City Boys 13
