= Marielitos (gangs) =

Immigrants from Cuba to the United States

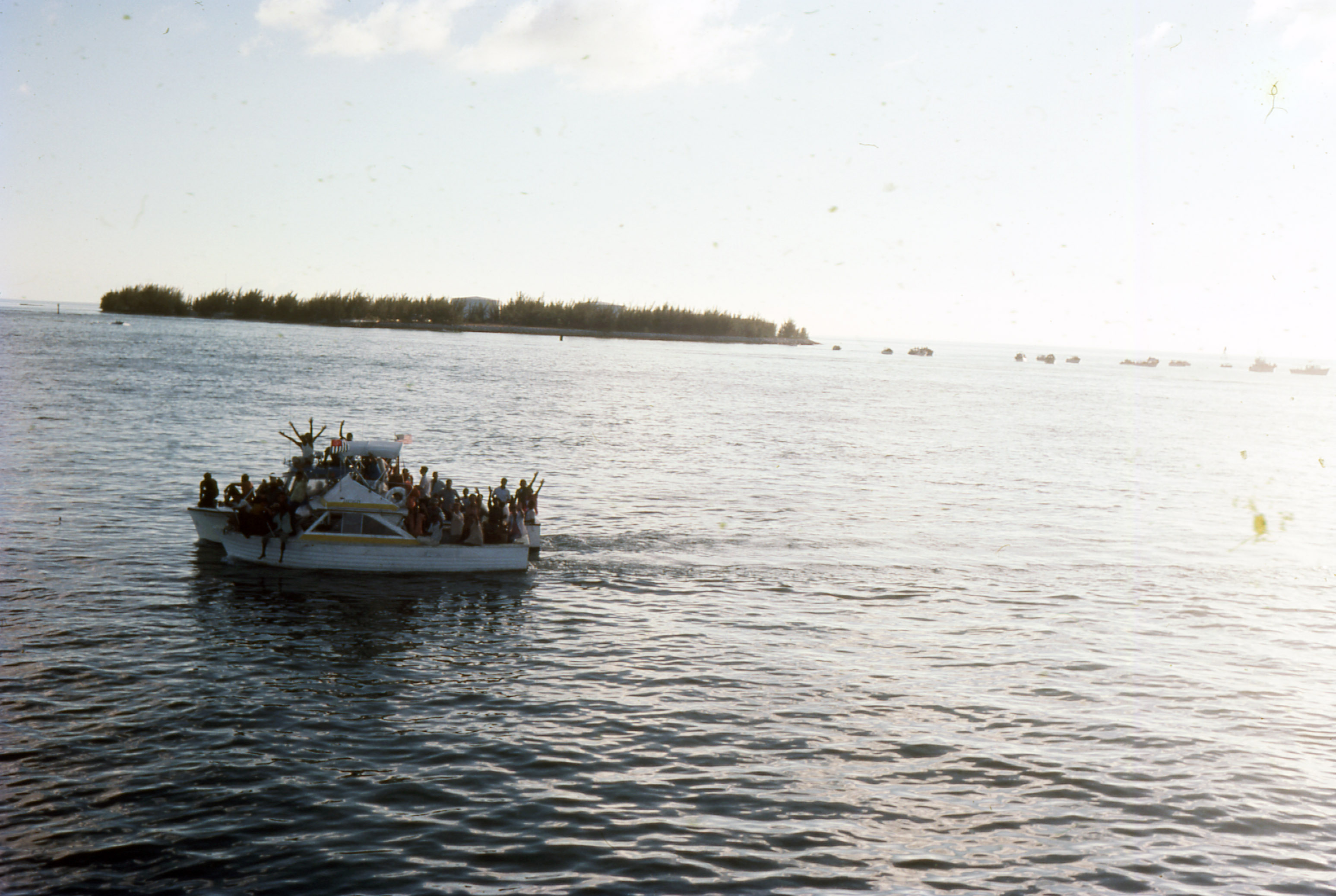
- Founded: Early 1980s
- Founding location: United States
- Years active: 1980s-present
- Ethnicity: Cuban, Cuban Americans
- Criminal activities: Drug trafficking, arms trafficking, human trafficking, contract killing, murders, thefts, breakins, pimping, prostitution, procurement
- Allies: Latin Kings, Vatos Locos
- Rivals: Netas, Trinitarios, Dominicans Don't Play

Marielitos is the name given to the Cuban immigrants that left Cuba from the Port of Mariel in 1980. Approximately 135,000 people left the country to the United States from April to September in what became known as the Mariel boatlift.

== History ==
While there already was a largely successful Cuban immigration to the United States before the 1980s, the third and most well-known wave of Cuban immigration was in 1980. The Cuban government permitted approximately 125,000 Cubans to board a decrepit fleet of boats in Mariel Harbor. Of the 125,000 refugees that entered the United States on the boatlift, around 16,000 to 20,000 were estimated to be criminals or "undesirables" according to a 1985 Sun Sentinel magazine article. In a 1985 report around 350 to 400 Mariel Cubans were reported to inhabit Dade County jails on a typical day. However, Demetrio Perez, the city commissioner of Miami, had said "That even among those Marielitos who had criminal records, there were thousands whose offenses were so minor that they would not be considered criminals here, and thousands of others whose ‘criminal record’ was based on their opposition to the Communist regime." Estimates assert that the Cuban refugees only included some 2,700 hardened criminals.

The U.S. government claimed to be ready to accept Marielito refugees with open-arms on May 5, 1980; however, this was short-lived after President Carter accused Castro of sending mostly criminals to the United States June 7 of the same year. Castro denied President Carter’s accusation only one week later, yet he agreed to accept 3,000 Marielitos back into Cuba. Remarkably, this was the only time Castro agreed to allow criminals back to the island for the next 30+ years.

Restrictions on these new American citizens tighten and loosen with the subsequent presidential administrations. President Clinton loosened restrictions to allow flights between Havana and Miami. President Bush tightened travel restrictions to allow a singular visit once every three years for the Marielitos.

In 2013, Raúl Castro, brother of Fidel Castro, took power over Cuba. When President Obama took office in 2009, he made an effort to loosen travel restrictions once again. He allowed unlimited trips for Marielitos to visit their families in an attempt to normalize relations with Cuba. In a similar fashion, Obama also declared there will be a U.S. Embassy in Havana, Cuba.

In 2019, Raúl Castro stepped down, and Miguel Diaz-Canel became his successor. The Trump administration imposed historically heavy sanctions on Cuba. The sanctions were the most extreme that Cuba had seen since Kennedy in the early 1960s. President Biden expressed desires in his campaign to ease these sanctions from the Trump administration but eventually authorized additional sanctions.

== Membership ==
Marielito crime gangs consist of generally male Cubans. Many of the original Marielitos have specific tattoos, displaying patron saints, names, words or arcane symbols. Marielito gang members, white Cubans as well as Black-Cubans, are members of Afro Cubans religious cults engaged in religious rituals often resulting in self-inflicted bodily scars. While the original Marielito gang members came to the US in the 1980s, younger Cuban-Americans living in impoverished neighborhoods may imitate the rituals of the original Marielito criminals.

== Activities ==
Marielito crime groups are mostly involved in drug trafficking and contract killing, although prostitution, corruption, extortion, robbery, burglary, auto theft and money laundering are also activities of choice. In some cases they have aligned themselves with American Mafia families and Colombian cartels to set up drug pipelines and working for them as enforcers. Marielito gang activity isn't as endemic as it was in the 80s, but Marielito gangs are still active in Los Angeles, Washington and New York City (especially the South Bronx).
