= RSK =

RSK may stand for:

- RSK Group, a UK consultancy group
- Republic of Serbian Krajina
- Robinson–Schensted–Knuth correspondence in mathematics
- Ribosomal s6 kinase, protein kinase
- RSK Sanyo Broadcasting, Japan
- Red Skin Kingz, Native American gang
- rsk, the ISO language code for Pannonian Rusyn
