= Lenox Street Boys =

- Founded: 1950s (possibly)
- Founding location: Boston, Massachusetts
- Years active: 1980's–present
- Territory: United States of America, Boston, Roxbury
- Ethnicity: Primarily African American
- Criminal activities: Drug trafficking, robbery and murder
- Allies: Orchard Park Trailblazers, Heath Street Gang, Academy Homes Gang, Villa Victoria Park Gang, Everton Geneva Grizzleys
- Rivals: Columbia Point Dawgs (long-standing), Vamp Hill Boys, H Block, X-men, Franklin Hill Giants, Greenwood Street Posse, Ruggles St, 1850 Washington St, Castle Square Cubs

The Lenox Street Boys also known as the "Lenox Street Cardinals" or Lenex Street Crew are one of the oldest and most dangerous street gangs in Boston, Massachusetts. The gang originated in the Lenox Street Projects in the Tremont section of Roxbury, Boston Possibly dating back to the 1950s along with the Ruggles Street gang. The gang has been visible on Boston Police's radar since the mid-1980s as they terrorized local stores and civilians. They were also among the only gangs to feud with New York–based drug gangs associated with drug lord Darryl Whiting.

During the early 1990s, the Lenox Street gang controlled the Lenox-Camden complex and the area around it, selling drugs. According to BPD a bloody war started when a crew of the Columbia Point Dawgs tried to set-up shop in their turf in Ramsey Park where Lenox members frequently congregated.

On August 16, 1991, three members of the Lenox Street Boys gunned down a well-known Columbia Point Dawg member Steven Gaul and wounding other CBDs in Ramsey Park. After a brief shootout with Columbia Point Dawgs, all three LSB members ran off. The shooting lead to several other retaliatory shootings in which two other Columbia Point Dawgs were shot.

== Investigations and prosecutions ==
=== 2011 Raid ===
Boston Police made a slew of arrests in 2011 after raiding the Lenox Street housing project, picking up 21 alleged drug dealers as part of a special operation targeting drugs and gun violence in the area. 18 men had been indicted on drug charges.

=== 2016 raid ===
Federal and state law enforcement officials raided the Lenox Street Projects arresting twenty-seven people, many of them allegedly connected to the Lenox Street Cardinals street gang in the Lenox Street Housing development. Nineteen were charged with distribution and possession of drugs and firearms while eight were hit with state-level drug distribution charges. Ten of the 19 have been arrested and charged.
