= Trinitario (disambiguation) =

Trinitario may refer to:

- Trinitario people
- a cultivar of the cocoa bean

== See also ==
- Trinitarios
