= Miami Boys =

African-American organized crime group

- Years active: 1982 -1996/1999
- Territory: Florida, Georgia, Ohio
- Ethnicity: African Americans
- Activities: drug trafficking, arms trafficking
- Allies: Black Mafia Family. Black Mafia
- Rivals: Zoe Pound, Shower Posse, Marielitos gangs

The Miami Boys was a notorious drug trafficking organization based in the Liberty City neighborhood of Miami, Florida. It was founded in 1982 by Issac Hicks "Big Ike" and James Sawyer "Bossman".

The Miami Boys was structured like organized crime or paramilitary group, with assigned ranks and sectors of territory ("quadrants"), and weapons such as Soviet AK-47s and Uzi submachine guns. By 1989, crews had expanded into different cities around the South and Midwest specifically, Atlanta, Tampa, Jacksonville, Augusta, and Columbus, Ohio and many other cities. The Miami Boys operated from two main hubs: one in Overtown and Liberty City.

== History ==
The Miami Boys were reported in the early 1980s in Miami when drug dealers ("the boys from Miami") traveled northwards. By 1986, the Miami Boys were operating in Atlanta, where an ounce of cocaine sold for triple the Miami price, displacing local small-time dealers. The gang arrived in Jacksonville, Florida in 1986, and members played a large role in that city's crack and heroin trade, until the last remaining Miami Boys dealer, Michael Delancy, was arrested in 1999. The gang was largely eliminated in Atlanta in 1996, as part of the city's efforts to prepare for the 1996 Summer Olympics.
