= Venice 13 =

Mexican-American street gang

- Founded: 1920-1930
- Founding location: Oakwood, Venice, Los Angeles, California, United States
- Years active: 1920 or 1930–present
- Territory: Venice
- Ethnicity: Mexican American
- Activities: Murder, kidnapping, extortion, assault, and vandalism
- Allies: Lennox13; PlayBoys Gangster Crips; Santa Monica 13; 18th Street gang Venice Shoreline Crips
- Rivals: Culver City Boys 13

Venice 13 or West Side Venice 13, abbreviated as V13 or VX3, is a Mexican American street gang based in the Oakwood (aka "Ghost Town") neighborhood of Venice, a section of Los Angeles, California. It has a substantial presence in East Venice as well as the Culver City/Los Angeles border, especially around Washington Blvd.

The gang dates back to the 1920s or 1930s. It was amongst the first Mexican gangs to fight gang wars against African-American gangs, especially the local Venice Shoreline Crips which were founded in the mid-1970s. It is affiliated with the Sureños and the Mexican Mafia. It is widely known for its deadly street violence with fellow Mexican-American gang, the Culver City Boys 13.

== History ==
After the 405 freeway tore through predominantly Mexican American and immigrant communities in the late 1950s and early 1960s, many migrated west into the Oakwood area of Venice Beach. Originally the Oakwood area was labeled as a "servant's zone" and was one of the only areas where African Americans could live on the Westside of Los Angeles. During this time Venice had been notoriously known as the "ghetto by the sea" due to the City of Los Angeles' negligent attitude toward the area, and as a result, Oakwood's cheap housing prices, which attracted young counterculture artists and poor European immigrants, and maintained a preexistent working-class African American population, made it relatively easy for Mexicans to settle in. It was in this extreme poverty that the Venice 13 gang formed, becoming one of the earliest gangs in the city.

Throughout the 1960s the gang grew rapidly and Venice gang members began playing an active role in the California prison system through Mexican Mafia membership, while on the streets the gang viciously battled with Culver City 13 creating a rivalry spanning over 50 years and still running. By this time the area was overrun with drugs and times changed, with V13 taking control of the drug trade as unemployment and racial tensions escalated, further fueling gang membership. Gang members found income supplying drugs to the hippies, and eventually high-income residents who came to Oakwood from affluent areas as crack cocaine arrived. In the 1990s Oakwood exploded when a war broke out between Venice 13, the Venice Shoreline Crips (VSLC) and the Culver City gang. As ordered by the Mexican Mafia, Venice 13 was to maintain control of Oakwood's drug trade and eventually a peace treaty formed between Venice 13 and the Crips. The 1980s and 1990s brought on a series of revitalization as white homeowners began purchasing property and renovating old houses, causing the City of Los Angeles to combat the gang problem although V13 still remains active.

== Cliques ==
Venice 13 is made up of a series of cliques, or subsets within the gang.

Dukes (DKS) Mainly active in the '80s and early '90s, the set is composed of older members. Duke members often wear clothes with the Duke University Blue Devil or blue Detroit Tigers caps.

Lil Jokers(LJKS L'Js) was a large clique from V13 and are still active.

Gangsters (G'S, GEES) are a large clique. Made up of some older members, the set has seen a rapid increase in membership and activity as more and more youngsters have grown and earned membership, replacing many past members who were specifically targeted by injunctions. The GEES look up to the Dukes clique because of their well-known gang activity "back in the day".

Malos (MLS) Mainly active east of Lincoln Blvd., the division between Oakwood and the rest of Venice, and East Venice.

Lil Locos (LLS')and the Big Locos(L' S), cliques that function within Oakwood as well as around the outskirts of Venice by displaced members. Mentioned in the original script for the movie American History X. They also have an asesinos[ASNS] clique and the Jokers[JKS]clique

== Injunctions ==
The Venice gang has also been the target of West Side gang injunctions in the 1990s along with Culver City 13, and the Venice Shoreline Crips.

== Rivalry ==
Venice 13's main rivals were the Santa Monica 13 and Santa Monica 17th St gangs, however they both settled a truce and formed an alliance. As well as 18th Street gang (particularly the 106th St in Inglewood), as well as the Grave Yard Gangsta Crips in Santa Monica and Culver City 13 in the Mar Vista neighborhood. Historically, the main rivals of the gang have long been Venice Shoreline Crips who have shared the same neighborhood in Venice called Oakwood, which in from early to mid 20th century was segregated and sectioned as the only area in Venice that African-Americans and Hispanics could own properties.

== Shoreline Crips ==
Venice 13 was involved in an intense battle with the Venice Shoreline Crips during the 1990s. The conflict escalated and in one point in time Venice 13 and the Culver City gang went as far as to set aside their own fight to unite against the Shorelines. In 1994 Venice 13 and the Shorelines bargained for a cease fire, after a war that left 55 people dead and many more wounded.

== Notoriety ==
Although the gang has been known to be relatively laid back and often members prefer not to exert themselves, they have gained notoriety for violent and often very reckless retaliation attacks. The gang is also involved in large scale narcotics trafficking business along the Oakwood and boardwalk areas, a prime market for selling to high income residents who come from surrounding affluent areas. Venice 13 has also been known to viciously defend their turf from outside drug trafficking and trespassing, with violators being killed or at least shot at.

Aside from the war with the Shorelines, V13 has also gained infamy as being the most violent rival of the Culver City gang. The gang has been known to publicly take credit for the murders of rivals by marking the neighborhood with "VX3," "V13" and "Venice 13" taggings. In one incident "V13s invaded the hospital in search of a Culver City enemy they hadn't quite managed to kill. It was necessary to give the patient a fictitious name and change all the labels on the census boards, chart backs, etc," as described by a nurse.

On November 7, 2007 members of the Venice 13 gang fired shots, from a vehicle leaving Venice High School, at alleged rival Culver City members who were standing outside the SHOP-4 building at approximately 2:58 pm. The incident began with an argument until it turned to gunfire. The argument is said to have start with gang identification. After the first victim, Carlos, was aware of the situation he was shot at leaving 3 holes on his sleeve with one bullet. He then tried running into other classes were teachers refused to keep him there. The two other victims are unknown. The school was put on lockdown and police were dispatched for extra security for a couple days until threat was minimized. Carlos and the other victims have disappeared only with rumors from friends of moving to Mexico.

== Gentrification ==
In 1994, due to the stigma of the neighborhood's reputation as "Los Angeles at its worst" many investors were deterred from the area.

With gentrification transforming the formerly more downscale sections of the West Side, many of its rivals are either near-defunct or in severe decline. With housing prices starting in the $500,000 and escalating into the millions from there, Venice 13 struggled to maintain the same presence it used to have in its neighborhood during the 1990s. While Oakwood was at one point a very inexpensive area to buy property, it is being sought after by wealthy artists and businesspeople at competitive prices. Famous movie stars such as actresses Julia Roberts and Anjelica Huston, and actor Nicolas Cage have taken residency in or around the Oakwood area. According to a Venice gang member, some Venice 13 members have even been forced into nearby Inglewood due to rent and housing costs. The affiliate, with plenty of animosity for the mostly, non-Hispanic white professional newcomers, stated that new home owners in the area at sometimes fail to even notice Oakwood as a gang neighborhood. This gentrification has been the cause of rising racial tension between the original African American and Latino residents and the more affluent newcomers.

The inconsistent pattern of gang violence in Oakwood has also scared many high income residents who are not accustomed to the neighborhood, such as a 2001 string of violent shootings which resulted in 3 murders in a two-week period. Months following the incidents residents reported the streets being empty at sundown despite increased police presence. In the November 2004 issue of Vanity Fair magazine author John Brodie contested that gentrification would fail as "...the gunplay of the Shoreline Crips and the V-13 is as much a part of life in Venice as pit bulls playing with blond Labs at the local dog park.".
