= KUMI 415 =

African-American prison gang

- Founding location: California, United States
- Years active: 1980s-present
- Ethnicity: African American,

Kumi African Nation Organization, generally referred to as 415 or Kumi 415 is a predominantly African-American prison gang that was originally formed in Folsom State Prison in the mid-1980s, and the founding members were mainly from the San Francisco Bay Area.

== Overview ==
Along with the Crips and Bloods, Kumi 415 members have recently provided recruitment pools for the Black Guerrilla Family, a gang with similarly large numbers in the Bay area and Northern California. In the Monterey County Jail, brief alliances have been reported among the Bloods, Crips, and Kumi 415 during the period leading up to Stanley Williams' execution.

Kumi is the Swahili word for the number ten, and the sum of 415 is ten. 415 also refers to San Francisco's area code. They have been reported in:

- Folsom State Prison
- Lerdo County Jail
- Monterey County Jail
- Pelican Bay State Prison
- Pleasant Valley State Prison in Coalinga, California
- Salinas Valley State Prison
- Selected areas across East County, San Diego
- Solano County Jail

== Tattoos and culture ==
Kumi African Nation Organization, also known as 415 or Kumi 415, often incorporate African symbols—including pictures of the continent itself—in their tattoos. For example, a popular tattoo among members of Kumi 415 depicts a yero, or African Warrior, rising up out of an outline of the continent of Africa. In his left hand he holds a machine gun, and in his right he holds a flag bearing the numbers 415. These images reflect the African orientation of both the Black Guerrilla Family and the Kumi African Nation Organization, which both encourage their members to learn Mau Mau history and words drawn from the Swahili language, which they use to communicate with each other in ways that will not be accessible to outsiders.
