= Ñetas =

Gang that began in the Puerto Rico prison system

Netas
- Founded: 1979; 47 years ago
- Founder: Carlos Torres Irriarte
- Founding location: Río Piedras State Penitentiary, Puerto Rico
- Years active: 1979–present
- Territory: 9 U.S. states, Puerto Rico and Spain.
- Ethnicity: Puerto Rican
- Membership (est.): 7,000 members in Puerto Rico and 5,000 in the United States
- Activities: Drug trafficking, assault, murder, auto theft, burglary, extortion, money laundering, robbery, weapons trafficking.
- Allies: Boricua Popular Army; Martinez Familia Sangeros; La ONU
- Rivals: 20 Luv; Latin Kings; Trinitarios; Dominicans Don't Play; Los Solidos; United Blood Nation; Grupo 27; La Rompe ONU

The NETA Association (Asociación Pro-Derechos del Confinado, "Association for Prisoners' Rights", Asociación NETA, or simply NETA) is the name of a gang that began in the Puerto Rico prison system and spread to the United States mainland. Although Puerto Rico has many small street gangs claiming its poorer neighborhoods, NETAS is by far the largest and most dominant, controlling the illegal drug trade in the island's prison system.

== History ==
The Asociación Ñeta (Ñeta Association) was founded in 1979 by Carlos Torres Irriarte, also known as "La Sombra" ("The Shadow"), when several pro-independence political prisoners were incarcerated in the maximum security Oso Blanco prison located in Rio Piedras. They formed as a mutual protection group, ostensibly to improve living conditions and defend inmates from abuses committed by guards and other prisoners, as well as to fight the prison gang Grupo 27 ("Group 27"), or the "Insectos" ("Insects"). The G27s called the Ñetas "Gusanos" ("Worms"). The Ñetas became the most dominant gang in the Oso Blanco prison by the early 1980s but their conflict with the G27s continued. On March 30, 1981, Ñetas leader Carlos Torres Irriarte was shot and stabbed to death by the G27s—along with the help of paid-off authorities—as he returned to his cell from the prison chapel. During the investigation of the murder of Irriarte, the correctional authorities found that he was likely betrayed by his lieutenants. His lieutenants wanted to get into the business of drug-trafficking in the prisons, which Irriarte had opposed. After the death of their founder, the Ñetas rioted, taking over several wings of the prison compound and the prison's pharmacy, where they stole narcotic medications. To avenge the murder of Irriarte, Ñeta members stabbed to death and dismembered the G27s leader "Manota" after breaking into his cell. By the middle of 1984, the Ñetas' numbers had multiplied excessively and the gang had taken over seven major prison facilities across the island. The gang threatened the prison administration into improving the living conditions within the facilities. They denounce and punish sexual offenders, pedophiles and abusers, and exile them to solitary confinement where they are not allowed to interact with the rest of the prison population. It became such a force that the Puerto Rico Department of Corrections and Rehabilitation physically segregated Ñetas and their rivals in separate buildings or facilities within the prisons.

== Organization and ideology ==
The Ñeta Association has an established hierarchical structure; each chapter's hierarchical leadership structure includes a president, vice president, treasurer, disciplinarian, and a coordinator responsible for organizing monthly meetings. The entire gang chapter participates in an election process in order to determine who will hold these six leadership positions. Prospective Ñetas members are required to serve a probationary period before being formally "blessed in" to membership at a meeting of the chapters held on March 30 of each year. Ñetas refer to each other as "hermanitos" and "hermanitas" (brothers and sisters). The gang has a membership of approximately 13,000, with 7,000 members in Puerto Rico and 5,000 in the United States. Ñeta chapters in Puerto Rico exist exclusively inside prisons. In the U.S., chapters exist both inside and outside prisons in 36 cities in nine states, primarily in the northeastern region. The states in which the Ñetas are most active include Connecticut, Florida, Massachusetts, New Jersey, New York, Pennsylvania, and Rhode Island.

Robert Walker of the website GangsOrUs.com has said of the Ñetas, "they use the facade of a cultural organization and see themselves as oppressed people who are unwilling to be governed by the United States." The Ñetas gang identifies with the Boricua Popular Army and their revolutionary philosophy in seeking independence for Puerto Rico. The gang's colors are red, white and blue, the national colors of Puerto Rico.

== Criminal activity ==
The Ñeta Association can be found throughout the prison systems of Puerto Rico and the United States. Operating mainly out of the tri-state and Upstate area, the gang is reported as having up to 6,000 members in the North East Coast of the U.S. alone. The Ñetas' main source of income is derived from the retail distribution of powdered and crack cocaine, heroin, marijuana and, to a lesser extent, LSD, MDMA, methamphetamine, and PCP. Ñeta members commit assault, auto theft, burglary, drive-by shooting, extortion, home invasion, money laundering, robbery, weapons and explosives trafficking, and witness intimidation. The Ñetas' rivals vary throughout territories. These rival gangs include the United Blood Nation, Crips, 20 Luv, Dominican Power, Dominicans Don't Play, MS-13, Los Solidos, Grupo 27 and Latin Kings.

=== Investigations and prosecutions ===
In the late 1990s, there were confirmed reports that Joanna Pimentel, known as "La Madrina", had been appointed council and leader of the New York City chapters. In 2001, Pimentel was convicted in a federal court in Brooklyn, New York, of ordering a gang-related killing in 1995 and was sentenced to life in prison. She is currently being held at the Federal Correctional Institution, Danbury, a federal prison in Connecticut.

On June 3, 2003, seven leaders of the Ñeta Association were arrested in Long Island, New York, for the stabbing and murder of two MS-13 members.

Ñetas members Amadeo Rodriguez and Christopher Moore were convicted of murder, conspiracy, assault, and the illegal use of firearms on June 18, 2008, in connection with the January 1, 2001, murder of Giovanni Aguilar at a residence in Freeport, New York. Aguilar, a landscaper, was killed because Rodriguez and Moore mistakenly believed that he was a member of the rival MS-13 gang. Rodriguez and Moore were sentenced to life imprisonment on July 27, 2010.

Twelve members of the Ñetas and the Bloods operating in Chelsea, Massachusetts, were indicted on federal and state drug and firearm charges on January 8, 2010. The prosecutions were the culmination of Operation Crossroads, a year-long investigation by the Federal Bureau of Investigation (FBI), Bureau of Alcohol, Tobacco, Firearms and Explosives (ATF), Massachusetts State Police (MSP) and local police.

In May 2012, forty-one people were indicted following a nine-month undercover investigation of a heroin ring in Camden, New Jersey, led by Noel Gonzalez and Michael Rivera, members of the Ñetas. During the arrests and searches, authorities seized approximately three-quarters of a kilogram of heroin, approximately $52,000 in cash, about $20,000 in counterfeit U.S. currency, a .40-caliber handgun and eight vehicles. Gonzalez died of natural causes in June 2013 with charges pending against him, and Rivera was sentenced to sixteen years in prison in May 2015. Over thirty others charged in the indictment pleaded guilty to charges of racketeering, conspiracy to distribute narcotics, or narcotics distribution, all of which resulted in state prison sentences ranging from five to ten years.

The alleged leader and twenty-nine alleged members and associates of a Perth Amboy, New Jersey–based drug network linked to the Ñetas were charged in August 2012 with first-degree racketeering. The network allegedly trafficked heroin and crack cocaine in Middlesex County and in New Jersey State Prison in Trenton. The indictment stemmed from Operation New Era Taking Action, a joint investigation by the DEA, New Jersey Department of Corrections, local police and other departments.

In Spain, membership of the Ñetas is predominantly Ecuadorian. The main rivals of the Spanish branch of the Ñetas is the Latin Kings. On May 11, 2014, a brawl occurred in Madrid involving Ñetas and Trinitarios which resulted in two injuries and the arrests of twenty-six gang members. Such Latin American gangs spread to the country as a result of mass deportations from the United States of Latin American immigrants with criminal records.

Jason "J-Live" Cabral, leader of the gang's Long Island faction, was sentenced on November 18, 2014, to a term of 37 years' imprisonment as a result of his guilty plea to the 2004 murders of Anthony Marcano and Fabian Mestres. The 17-year-old Marcano and Mestres, members of the Latin Kings, were robbed and killed after being lured to a house in Brentwood on August 10, 2004.

Fifty members and associates of the Ñetas in Puerto Rico were indicted on various Racketeer Influenced and Corrupt Organizations Act (RICO) charges, including racketeering, drug trafficking and murder, on May 11, 2016. The third trial against the gang concluded on July 25, 2019. Over forty members, including the organization's supreme leader and his main lieutenants, were ultimately convicted.

== See also ==
- Crime in Puerto Rico
- Prison gangs in the United States
