= Murder of Lesandro Guzman-Feliz =

2018 murder of a teenager in the Bronx, New York City

Murder of Lesandro "Junior" Guzman-Feliz
- Location: 40.8547°N 73.8918°W; Intersection of Bathgate Avenue and East 183rd Street, New York City (Belmont, Bronx), US
- Date: June 20, 2018 (8 years ago)
- Attack type: Machete attack, stabbing, gang violence
- Deaths: 1
- No. of participants: 14 suspects (all convicted)

The murder of Lesandro Guzman-Feliz occurred on June 20, 2018; the 15-year-old was killed by members of the Dominican-American gang Trinitarios in the Belmont neighborhood of the Bronx. The death occurred due to mistaken identification. Public outrage arose when graphic video of the murder began to circulate on the Internet. Fourteen suspects, all members of the Trinitario gang, were arrested in connection with Guzman-Feliz's death.

== Murder ==
On June 20, 2018, at 11:30 p.m. (EDT), 15-year-old Lesandro "Junior" Guzman-Feliz left his apartment to meet with a friend. While out, he noticed four vehicles and became alarmed. He began to run and was chased for several blocks by gang members occupying the vehicles. Eventually, Guzman-Feliz sought refuge in a bodega at Bathgate Avenue and East 183rd Street in Belmont, Bronx, near his residence. The store owner (and others) witnessed the attack but initially prevented Junior from hiding behind the counter, being at first unsure of precisely what was occurring. After recognizing Junior and seeing his fear, the store owner relented and allowed him behind the counter, but Junior was nevertheless spotted by one of the gang members, who then proceeded to drag him outside, where three others waited.

The brutal killing had a significant impact upon the bodega owner. The bodega owner claimed in an MTV interview that his mother had a heart attack after viewing the security footage of the attack and died. The bodega owner also claims to have had thoughts of self-harm and had to seek psychological therapy.

The killing was captured on CCTV video inside the shop, as well as on cell phone video taken from an overhead angle by a resident of one of the building's upper floors. The cell phone video shows a dozen or more males arriving and departing at the scene. Bodega surveillance footage shows several men stabbing Guzman-Feliz with large knives and machetes. The video shows Guzman-Feliz re-entering the store; however, he appeared to be sent outside. The video shows him stumbling out of the bodega and running east on 183rd Street toward St. Barnabas Hospital, one block away. Cell phone footage showed Guzman-Feliz collapse on a step at a security booth a few yards from the hospital entrance. The video shows witnesses who knew the victim screaming frantically, holding cloths to his wounds, and attempting to console him as he died. Guzman-Feliz died only minutes after the attack at the bodega.

According to the boyfriend of Guzman-Feliz's sister, a Trinitario gang leader said on Snapchat that the killing was due to mistaken identification. Initial reports indicated that authorities considered the possibility that the murder might have been triggered by a sex video shared on Facebook, showing an individual resembling Guzman-Feliz with a young woman who was thought to be a relative of a gang member.

A hashtag, #justiceforjunior, was created and went viral on social media outlets such as Twitter and Instagram. Public outrage ensued when the graphic video of Guzman-Feliz's killing began to circulate on the Internet. Police tip lines received a "torrent" of calls from witnesses and other people identifying the suspects. Officers' posts on Twitter and Instagram were shared and viewed over 100,000 times.

== Motive ==
The killing of Guzman-Feliz was purportedly due to mistaken identification of a teen who was part of a rival gang. The police reported that the killers, all members of the Trinitarios subset "Los Sures", mistakenly believed that Guzman-Feliz was a member of the rival "Sunset" gang. Bronx County District Attorney Darcel Clark said that Guzman-Feliz had no ties to any gang activity.

== Victim ==
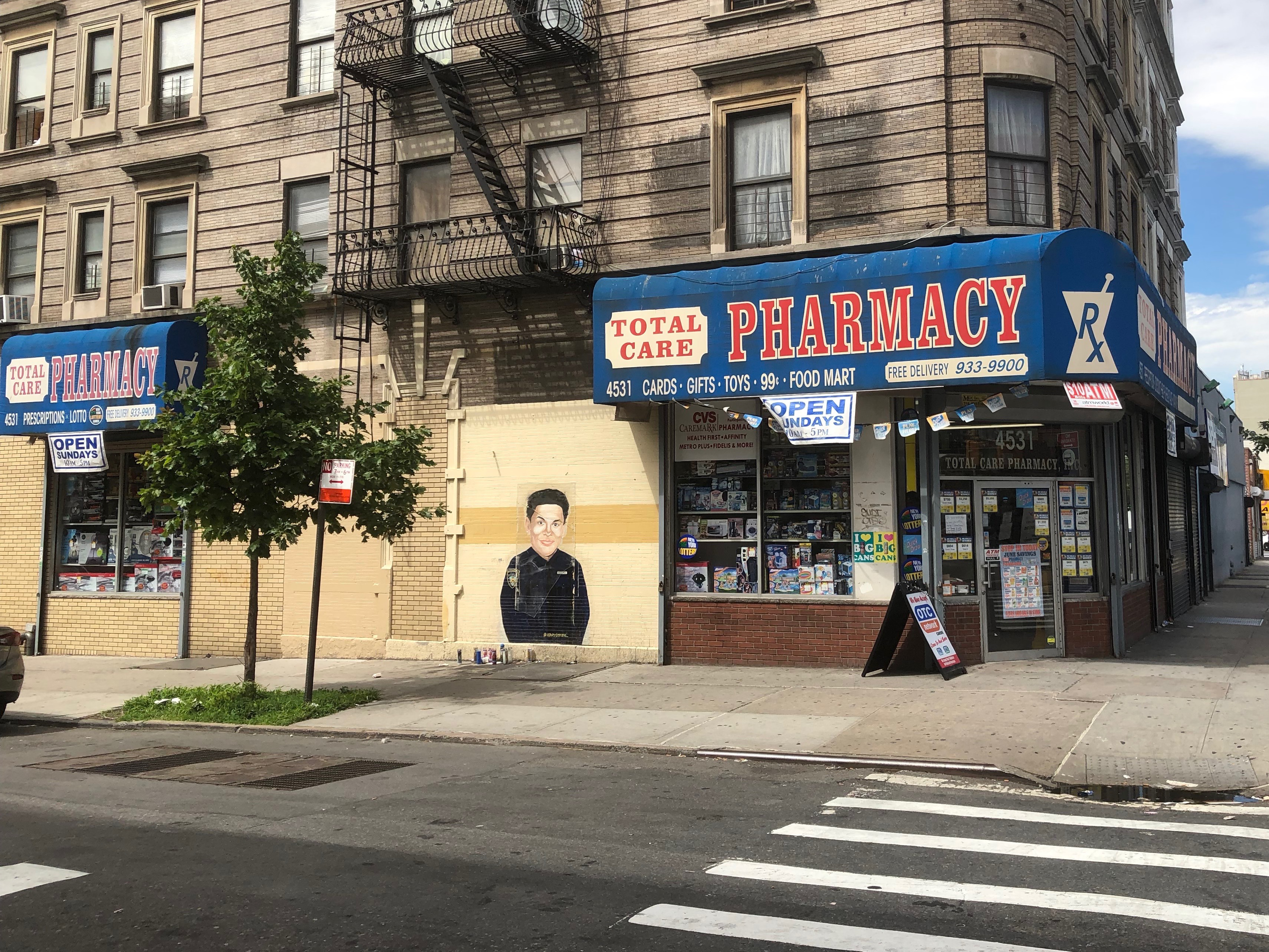
Lesandro Guzman-Feliz memorial at the corner of Bathgate Avenue and 183rd Street

Lesandro Guzman-Feliz (November 11, 2002 – June 20, 2018), known as "Junior", was 15 years old at the time of his death. His family included: his father, Lisandro Guzman; his mother, Leandra Feliz; his older sister, Genesis Collado-Feliz; and his brother, Manuel Ortiz. He attended the Dr. Richard Izquierdo Health & Science Charter School, where he was a sophomore. He was of Dominican descent.

Guzman-Feliz aspired to become a detective and was a member of the New York City Police Department (NYPD) Explorers program, a group for youths interested in law enforcement careers. His funeral, at Our Lady of Mount Carmel Church in the Bronx, was attended by thousands. Pallbearers were attired in New York Yankees jerseys as a nod to Guzman-Feliz's favorite baseball team. He was interred in Saint Raymond's Cemetery in the Bronx.

After his death, the NYPD established a scholarship in Guzman-Feliz's name. The corner of Bathgate Avenue and 183rd Street, where Guzman-Feliz was killed, was ceremonially renamed "Lesandro Junior Guzman-Feliz Way" in February 2019, on his mother's birthday.

== Perpetrators and suspects ==
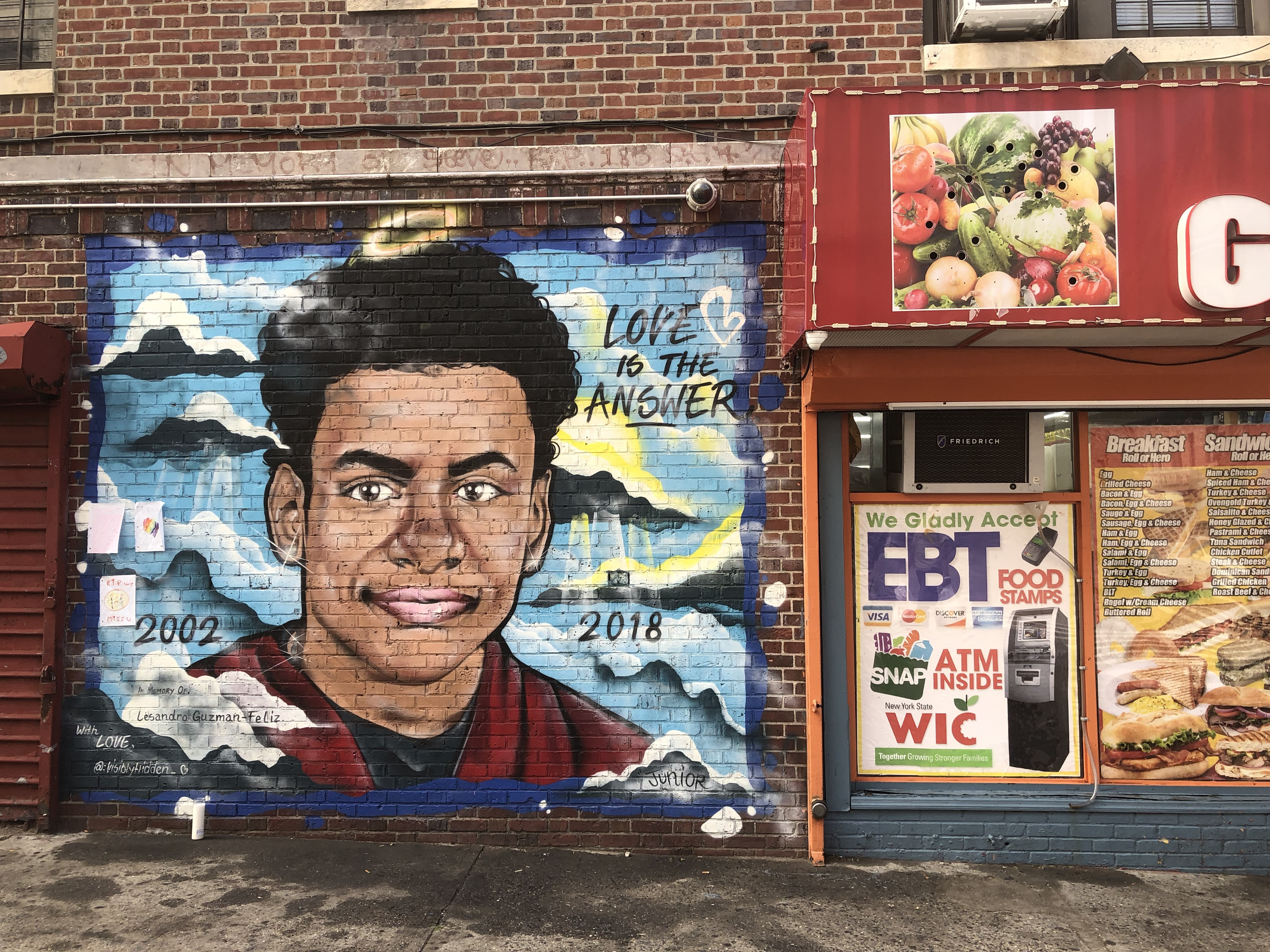
Memorial to Lesandro Guzman-Feliz across the street from the St. Barnabas Hospital entrance

Fourteen suspects were arrested in connection with Guzman-Feliz's death. All were members of the Dominican gang Trinitario and between the age of 18 and 29.

- Michael "Sosa" Reyes, age unknown (turned state's witness, all charges dropped)
- Kevin Alvarez, age 19 (turned state's witness, convicted of conspiracy, sentenced to no additional time)
- Luis Cabrera-Santos, age 25 (convicted of 1st degree manslaughter, sentenced to 12 years)
- Danel Fernandez, age 21 (convicted of 1st degree manslaughter, sentenced to 18 years)
- Elvin Garcia, age 23 (convicted of 1st degree murder, amongst other charges; sentenced to 25 years to life)
- Antonio Rodriguez Hernandez Santiago, age 24 (convicted of 1st degree murder, amongst other charges; sentenced to 25 years to life)
- Jonaiki Martinez-Estrella, age 24 (convicted of 2nd degree murder, amongst other charges; sentenced to 25 years to life, died in prison)
- Jose Muniz, age 21 (convicted of 1st degree murder, amongst other charges; sentenced to 25 years to life)
- Danilo Payamps-Pacheco, age 21 (convicted of 1st degree manslaughter, sentenced to 12 years)
- Gabriel Ramirez-Concepcion, age 26 (convicted of 1st degree manslaughter, sentenced to 12 years)
- Manuel Rivera, age 18 (convicted of 1st degree murder, amongst other charges; sentenced to 23 years to life)
- Diego Suero, age 29 (convicted of 2nd degree murder, sentenced to 25 years to life)
- Jose Tavarez, age 21 (convicted of 1st degree manslaughter, sentenced to 15 years)
- Fredrick Then, age 20 (convicted of 2nd degree murder, sentenced to 25 years to life)
- Ronald Ureña, age 29 (convicted of 1st degree manslaughter, sentenced to 15 years)

Police alleged Suero to be the ringleader, who ordered the murder of Guzman-Feliz. Officers also claimed that Martinez-Estrella delivered the fatal blow to Guzman-Feliz.

Four of the suspects (Fernandez, Muniz, Rivera, and Hernandez) were incarcerated at Rikers Island and received death threats, even from other members of the Trinitario gang, while awaiting trial. Jail officials segregated them from other prisoners and they received heightened security protection at the jail. In December 2018, while detained at Rikers Island, Rivera received a slash wound on his face from a fellow inmate. The suspect was allegedly a rival gang member. Michael Sosa Reyes, a former suspect, was a cooperating witness.

On June 29th, 2025, at approximately 1:15 PM EDT, one of the fourteen suspects, Jonaiki Martinez-Estrella (who struck the fatal blow to Guzman-Feliz), died in his cell at Coxsackie Correctional Facility in Upstate New York. His cause of death remains unknown.

== Trial verdict ==
Nearly a full year after Guzman-Feliz was killed outside of the Bronx bodega, five accused suspects were convicted of his murder. In a Bronx courtroom on June 14, 2019, a jury convicted Jonaiki Martinez-Estrella, Manuel Rivera, Elvin Garcia, Jose Muniz and Antonio Rodriguez Hernandez of first-degree murder, second-degree murder, gang assault, and conspiracy. By also convicting the defendants of first-degree murder, the jury acknowledged that Guzman-Feliz was tortured before his death.

Jonaiki Martinez-Estrella was sentenced to life in prison for first-degree murder, 25 years to life for second-degree murder, and up to 25 and up to 15 years for conspiracy and gang assault respectively, all to run concurrently. The first-degree murder conviction was later vacated for lack of evidence. Manuel Rivera was sentenced to 23 years to life for first and second-degree murder, and up to 15 years for conspiracy and 15 years for gang assault. The three other defendants were sentenced to 25 years to life for first and second-degree murder, up to 25 years for conspiracy, and 15 years for gang assault.

== Subsequent events ==
In June 2025, Jonaiki Martinez-Estrella was found dead in his cell. The cause of death has yet to be determined.

== See also ==
- Crime in New York City
- Gangs in the United States
