= 80 Blocks from Tiffany's =

1979 documentary film

- Directed by: Gary Weis
- Written by: John Bradshaw
- Produced by: Gary Weis
- Cinematography: Joan Churchill
- Edited by: Michal Goldman
- Production company: Above Average Productions
- Distributed by: Pacific Arts Entertainment
- Release date: 1979
- Running time: 67 minutes
- Country: United States
- Language: English

80 Blocks from Tiffany's is a 1979 documentary directed by Gary Weis. It depicts the lives of gang members living in the South Bronx.

The film captures the South Bronx during an era that was rarely captured on film. It also captures New York City just before the advent of hip hop, the devastating effects of the crack epidemic and before the proliferation of gang gun violence.

Originally filmed for NBC, the film never made it to air and was instead released to VHS as an educational video. Over time the film gained a cult following and was reissued on DVD in 2010.

== Synopsis ==
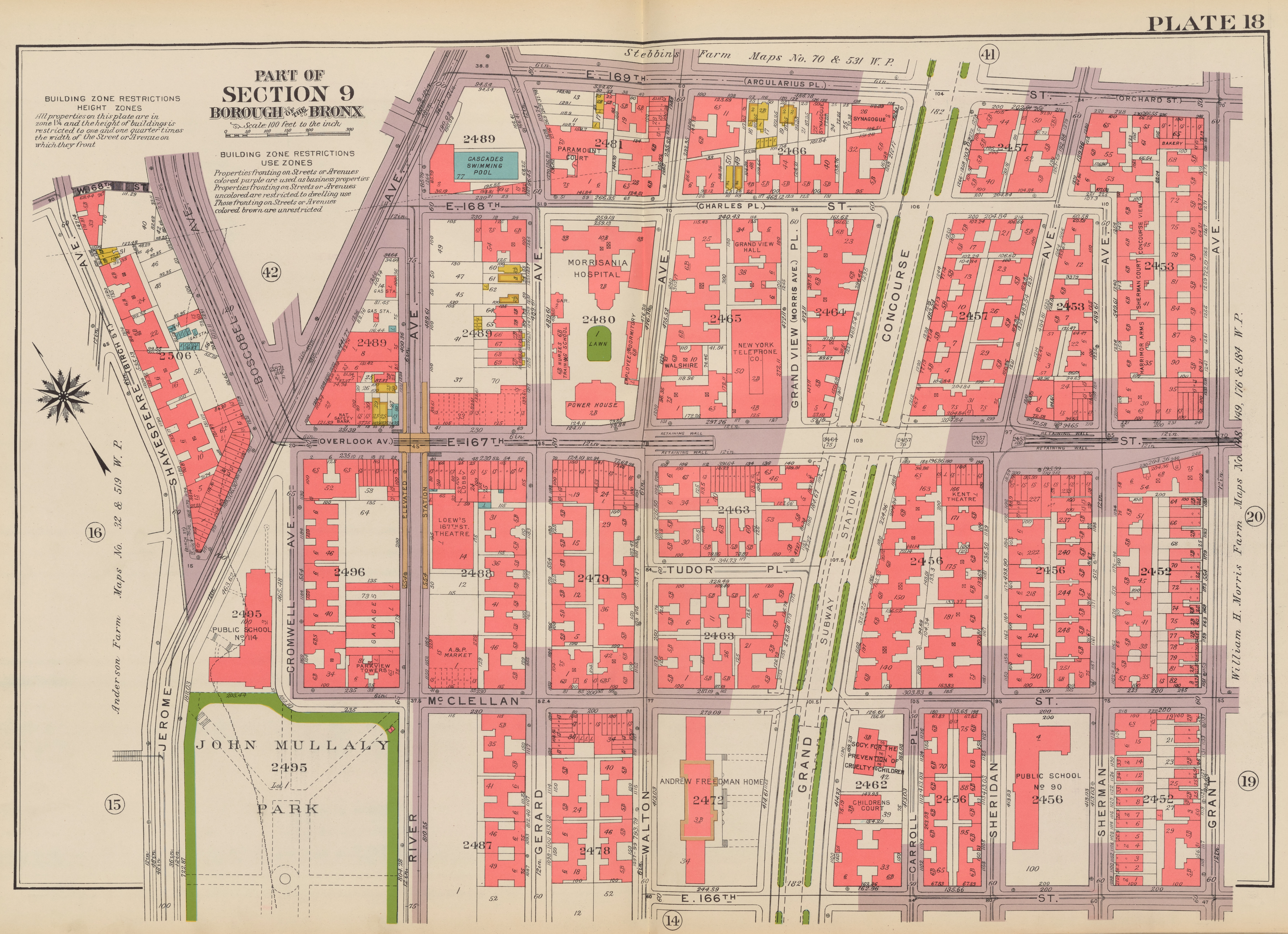
Map of the region depicted in the film (Grand Concourse area, 166th–169th Streets) on a 1942 map.

80 Blocks from Tiffany's documents the lives of African American and Puerto Rican gang members in the Grand Concourse area of the South Bronx, between 167th and 170th Streets. The film focuses primarily on the members of two gangs, the Savage Skulls and the Savage Nomads, in an area with a high level of crime and urban decay. The film also deals with many social issues affecting the area and its residents, such as poverty, teen pregnancy, drug and alcohol abuse and illiteracy.

== Production ==
Director, Gary Weis, created film shorts for Saturday Night Live in the late 1970s and NBC's entertainment division subsequently commissioned him to direct some full-length films to be aired during SNL's timeslot when the show was on summer hiatus. The film was shot by Weis and six crew members over the span of two weeks during the summer of 1979. Weis was inspired to do the film after having read a 1978 investigative article about the area, written by Jon Bradshaw for Esquire magazine. Weis gained access to gang members with Bradshaw's assistance. He also consulted with community organizer Joan Butler and Bob Werner, leader of the NYPD's Youth Gang Task Force. The film crew followed gang members to their clubhouses and also interviewed police.

Other than the odd trip to Yankee Stadium, 80 Blocks from Tiffany's marked the first time that Weis had been to the South Bronx. In a 2010 interview with The New York Times, Weis reflected upon seeing the streets of the South Bronx for the first time—with its burned-out buildings falling to rubble and stripped-down cars abandoned in the streets—and said that the scene looked to him like "postwar Dresden". The film, however, provides little by way of social commentary and Weis stated that this was intentional; "We just followed them around and let them speak their mind, and they happened to be very good on camera."

In reference to the movie's title, Weis told The Guardian in 2010: "We gave it that title because it was 80 blocks away from where Tiffany's was on Fifth Avenue and these guys never, ever left the Bronx." (Note: The Tiffany & Co. flagship store is on the intersection of 5th Avenue and East 57th Street. 80 blocks to the north would take one onto East 137th Street, near the southernmost part of the Bronx.)

While the documentary was filmed for NBC, it did not make it to air. In a 2010 interview with BlackBook magazine, Weis said that NBC was reluctant to air the film because of a recent legal case brought against ABC related to a movie made by their entertainment division of the news. "They said it would have been fine if the news division [of NBC] had done it," Weis explained. 80 Blocks from Tiffany's premiered at the Los Angeles Film Festival in 1980, but was not released theatrically and was instead released to video in 1985 by Pacific Arts Entertainment as an education film.

The film is distinctive because it captures an era of the South Bronx that was rarely captured on film. It also captures New York City just prior to the explosion of hip hop, the crack epidemic and the proliferation of guns among street gangs. The VHS version of the film increased in demand as the film gained a cult following, particularly among hip hop fans. Weis was unaware of the film's popularity until he came across it on YouTube in 2007. As a result, the film was re-released to DVD in 2010. The Esquire article that inspired the film was also included with the DVD.
