= Iran Nazario =

American former gangster and activist (born c. 1970)

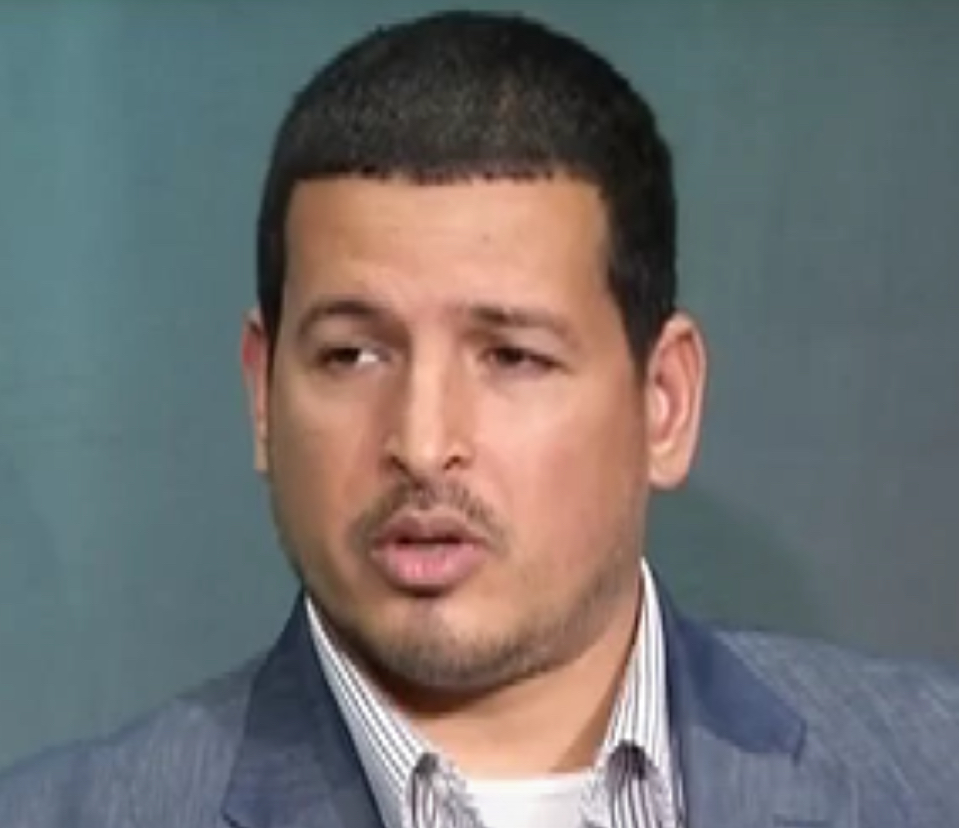
- Narazio in 2017
- Born: c. 1970 (age 54–55); Hartford, Connecticut
- Other names: Smurf
- Occupations: Gang member (former); activist
- Organizations: Savage Nomads; Los Solidos
- Criminal charges: Racketeering
- Criminal penalty: 27 years
- Criminal status: Released

Iran "Smurf" Nazario (born c. 1970) is an American former gang member and activist.

== Early life ==
Nazario was born c. 1970 in Hartford, Connecticut, and grew up around violence in his foster family. He was first introduced to gang life at age 11, when he was beaten by Hartford gang members. He was homeless from age 13 to 18, and was arrested for the first time in 1987 after stabbing somebody.

== Gang activity ==
He served as a gang leader during the 1980s and 1990s, leading the Savage Nomads and the Los Solidos, until he and six other gang members were arrested and charged for the drive-by shooting of Angel Serrano, a rival gang member, and a firebombing. He was convicted by judge Christopher F. Droney to 27 years in prison.

In 1997, he was resentenced to 18 months in prison plus 6 months in a halfway house by Peter Collins Dorsey, for lying in order to conceal his crimes.

== Post-gang activity ==
After being released from prison in 2000, he wrote a book titled Rage to Peace: From Wounded Child to Gang Member to Peace Advocate, detailing his experiences with gangs and activism. In 2016, he founded of the Peace Center of Connecticut, a not-for-profit peace organization in Connecticut.
