= Santa Monica 13 =

Mexican-American street gang

- Founded: 1920s
- Founding location: Santa Monica, California, United States
- Years active: 1920s–present
- Territory: Pico District, Santa Monica
- Ethnicity: Mexican American
- Activities: Murder, drug trafficking, extortion, assault, auto theft, robbery
- Allies: Mexican Mafia; Sureños; Venice 13 (after the truce)
- Rivals: 18th Street gang Culver City Boys; Venice 13; Venice Shoreline Crips; Grave Yard Gangster Crips; Sotel 13

Santa Monica 13 or SMG is a Mexican-American street gang located in Santa Monica, California, United States. They reside mainly in the Pico neighborhood. Even though Santa Monica 13 is a Sureño gang, they wear their traditional black bandanas. The acronym SM17 refers to Santa Monica 17th Street, which is the gang's primary subset or "clique". They write up "SMG" or "Santa Monica Gang" to show solidarity.

== History ==
The Santa Monica Gang was the first gang to originate on the Westside of Los Angeles in the late 1920s, formerly known as the Santa Monica Tomato Patch Gang. They had given birth to all the surrounding gangs in the area. The gang simply became known as Santa Monica 13 and, since the creation of the Mexican Mafia in the 1950s, have been known for their violent ways.

== Cliques ==
The only active clique remaining in the 17th Street gang are the "Pee Wee Locos", and the only active remaining clique of Santa Monica 13 are the "Little Locos". Other cliques have come and gone over time, including the 11th Street Chavos, 17th Street Tiny Locos, 17th Street Locas, 20th Streeters, 21st. Deadend Winos, Midget Locos and the Crickets.

== Graffiti ==
The gang's graffiti includes the symbols "SM" "SMG", "SM13" or "SMX3" and for the 17th Street gang, "SM17" or "SMXVII" plus "SMX7" or "SMXV2st".
