= Free Souls Motorcycle Club =

Outlaw motorcycle club

Free Souls MC
- Founded: 1969
- Type: Outlaw motorcycle club
- Location: Eugene, Oregon, U.S.
- Region served: Pacific Northwest

The Free Souls Motorcycle Club is an outlaw motorcycle club that was formed in Eugene, Oregon, in 1969. Chapters exist in Oregon, Washington, Germany and Australia. The club's center patch consists of an ankh over a motorcycle wheel on a set of handlebars. Its colors are blue and white, as is its metonym.
