= Savage Skulls =

- Founded: December 12th 1969 Bronx, NY
- Years active: 1969 to present
- Territory: Hunts Point, Bronx, New York
- Activities: beatings, murders, thefts, extortion

The Savage Skulls are a mostly Puerto Rican and African American street gang started in the Hunts Point area of the Bronx during the late 1960s, gaining popularity in the 1970s. The gang declared war on the drug dealers operating in the Hunts Point area in the early 1970s, and was also involved in a number of running battles with rival gangs, including the Seven Immortals, Savage Nomads, and Dirty Dozen.

The gang was photographed by Jean-Pierre Laffont in 1972 and were the subject of the 1979 documentary film 80 Blocks From Tiffany's. The leader of the gang was Felipe Mercado. Like the Savage Nomads, gang members would appropriate Nazi symbolism to project "how menacing and terrible they were." This included wearing swastikas, wearing Nazi helmets and having positions called "Gestapo" within the gang's ranks.

== See also ==
- Universal Zulu Nation
- 80 Blocks from Tiffany's
- Black Spades
- Savage Nomads
- Julio 204
