= 10th Street Gang =

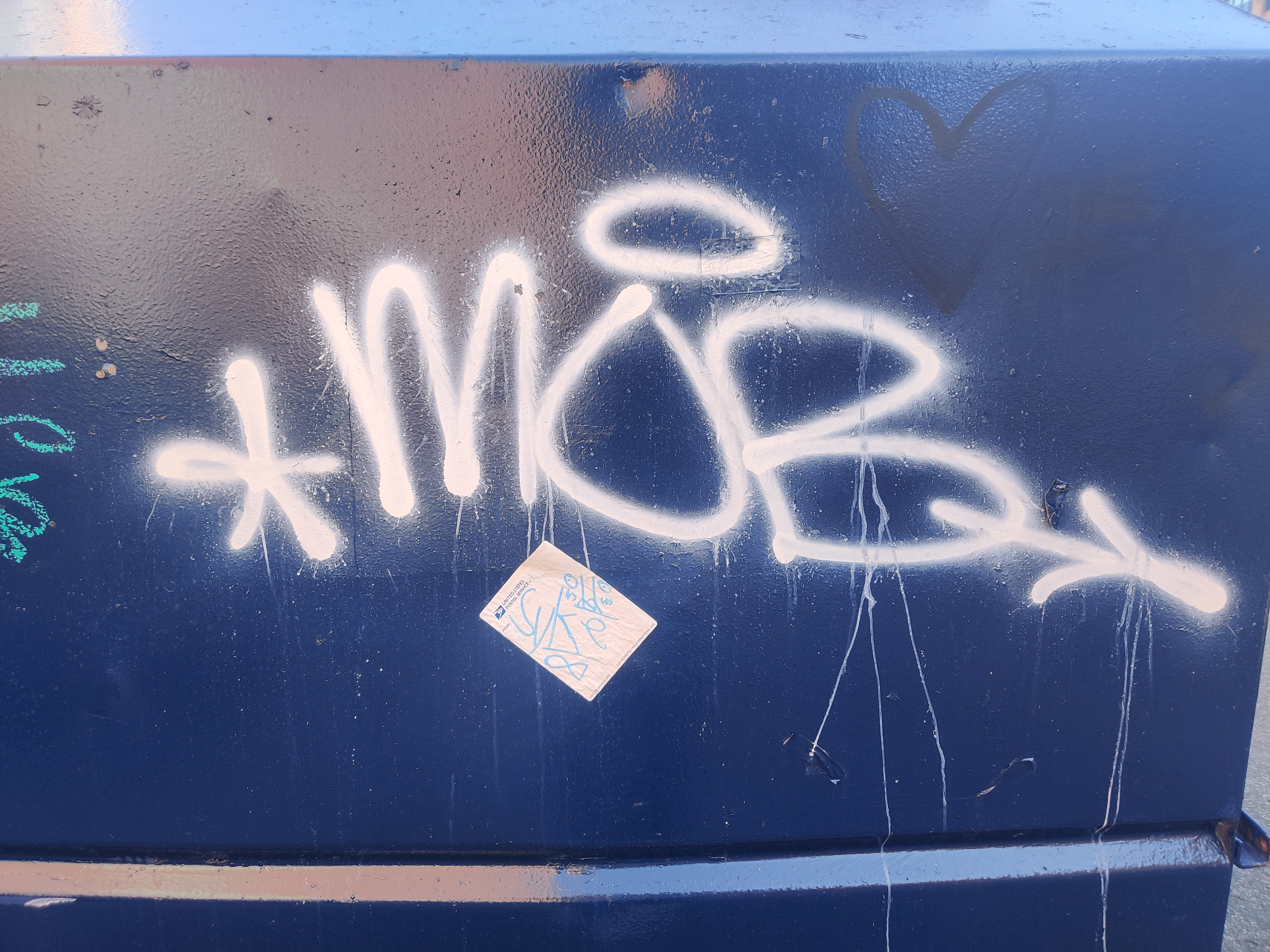
- 10th Street Gang graffiti
- Founded: 1980s
- Years active: 1980s to present
- Territory: Parts of Lower and Upper West Side, Buffalo, New York
- Ethnicity: Mainly Hispanic
- Rivals: 7th Street Gang

10th Street Gang also known as 1015 and MOB was a street gang located in Buffalo, New York. The gang established themselves between Niagara Street and Richmond Avenue with Auburn Avenue as the north border and Carolina Street being the south border of their territory.

== History ==
The gang first formed in the 1980's in the original area of 10th Street and Maryland Avenue in the Lower West Side of Buffalo, New York as a multicultural gang with a hispanic majority. The gang did not have a leader like many traditional street gangs. The gangs home base was the Tenth Street Playground located on 10th Street between Hudson Street and Maryland Avenue. This well established hood would see at least 6 Generations with the 4th generation of the gang choosing to go by the name “1015 Gang”, a name created to symbolize an alliance with a group of affiliates who were based on 15th Street between West Utica and Rhode Island Street on the Upper West Side. The gang started garnering infamy when they started having rivalries with a newly established gang, the 7th Street gang. The rivalry between the gangs exalted in the year of 2009 when gang violence was at an all-time high in the area. On some occasions civilians were caught in the crossfire between the two gangs. Between 2009 and 2012, both gangs would be involved in 38 homicides. Members of the 10th street gang routinely guarded the bordering areas of the territory that the 10th Street claimed.

In 2011, 27 members of the 10th Street Gang were arrested after an investigation concluded with Racketeer Influenced and Corrupt Organizations Act violations and some being charged with murders then later in September, 8 more gang members were arrested by federal agents.
