= Lucerne Street Doggz =

- Founded: 2003
- Founding location: Boston, Massachusetts
- Years active: 2003-Present
- Territory: United States of America, Boston
- Ethnicity: Primarily African American
- Membership (est.): 50+
- Criminal activities: Drug trafficking, robbery and murder
- Allies: Mascot Street Killas
- Rivals: Norfolk street Bulls, Morse Street County

Lucerne Street Doggz are a street gang in the Lucerne Street area of Mattapan neighborhood in Boston. In 2006 Lucerne Street Gang was involved in 37 shootings in Boston counting for 10% of all shootings that year.

== See also ==
- Columbia Point Dawgs
