= CBL/BFL =

- Founded: 2009
- Years active: 2009—Present
- Territory: Towne Gardens Housing Complex
- Ethnicity: Mainly African American
- Rivals: Ronnie Gang

CBL/BFL, also known by the full name Cash Been Long / Brothers For Life, is an American gang based in Buffalo, New York and was established in the Towne Gardens Housing Complex located in Willert Park in 2009.

== History ==
The gang was established around 2009 in the Towne Gardens Housing Complex and to this day it remains the central hub and operational center for the gang in which they use the housing complex to racketeer weapons and narcotics which lead to many gang members being convicted for and the nearby area of the Town Gardens Housing Complex has caused drug trafficking turf wars to see who would get control of the area as their gang's turf. Many of the members of the gang live in the housing complex. Members utilized parking lots and a retail plaza adjacent to the Towne Gardens to distribute narcotics, including heroin, fentanyl, cocaine, crack cocaine, marijuana, and other controlled substances. The gang has extended operations outside of the Towne Gardens area and out near the corner area of Jefferson Avenue near Broadway extending to the Broadway-Fillmore and Clinton Avenue which is situated outside of the Towne Gardens Housing Complex in which they use the areas to transport weaponries and narcotics.

On September 21, 2015, a member of the CBL/BFL gang by the name of Miquise Jones who went by the alias Scaife attempted to murder three rival gang members on East Ferry Street and then Dodge Street in Buffalo in a revenge attack for a murdered CBL/BFL gang member by the name of Larell Watkins, where one of the victims, only known as Victim L, ran into a local corner store in an attempt to not get shot which then, approximately 20 minutes later, Jones drove to Genesee and Crossman Streets where another co-defendant shot another rival gang member, only identified as Victim K. After this, in December 2016, rival gang members would shoot at Jones while he was at Skyzone in Cheektowaga in which Jones would respond by firing gunshots at a rival gang member in a bar called The Grove in Buffalo. Another accomplice to this shooting was Maurice Rice who helped assist in the attempted murder of the three rival gang members, he would be sentenced to 19 years in prison for conspiracy and Racketeer Influenced and Corrupt Organizations Act violations. The person who directly attempted to murder the three rival gang members, Miquise Jones, wasn't convicted for the attempted murders but was convicted of racketeering and narcotics conspiracy and was sentenced to serve 188 months (15 and over a half years) for it and another accomplice was convicted of making false declarations before a federal grand jury when making claims about the attempted murder and obstruction of justice and was sentenced to serve 48 months (4 years) in prison.

In 2020, the United States Attorney General convicted CBL/BFL gang member, Dalvon Curry, of the murder of Jaquan Sullivan, a rival gang member, in December 2015 and Xavier Wimes, a fellow gang member, on New Year's Day 2017. 12 other CBL/BFL members took pleas in relation to the murders. Dalvon Curry was considered one of the last if the 13 gang members that were related to the murder to be convicted, in which he will serve a mandatory life sentence.

Members of the gang have participated in the creation of music videos, particularly those of the rap and drill genre. In these videos, members of the CBL/BFL gang exhibit their association with criminal activity including the showing off the United States currency and what seems to be illegally owned and bought firearms which are meant to be displayed in a mocking, violent, and overall to give shock value.

The gang's main form of profits is the sale of narcotics which include the distribution of the narcotics all the way to downtown. The gang also gained infamy after the gang was connected and directly involved with several murders and acts of violence in the area with many of the perpetrators having gang symbols on them, including colors on clothing and gang tattoos.
