= LRGP (gang) =

- Founded: 2000s
- Named after: Multiple streets
- Founding location: Broadway-Fillmore, Buffalo
- Years active: 2000s—2016 (Note: Though some remnants exist still)
- Territory: Broadway-Fillmore, Buffalo, Broadway Market
- Ethnicity: Mainly African American
- Allies: Bloods
- Rivals: Bailey Boys

Lombard, Rother, Gibson, and Playter (LRGP), also known as the LRGP Crew, is/was a gang based in Buffalo, New York in the Broadway-Fillmore area of the city and is the direct opposition to the Bailey Boys.

== History ==
The gang was established in the 2000s and was mainly active in the 2000s and 2010s mainly against the Bailey Boys in which they sold many narcotics including marijuana and crack cocaine in the area which was continued heavily until crack-downs by the local Federal Bureau of Investigation in Western New York in late 2011 in which around an estimated 20 members of the LRGP gang was arrested at a home at 41 Houghton Avenue and the members will be sentenced to 20 years in prison and a $500,000 fine, respectively. The territory of the LRGP gang was heavily centered in the Broadway market area and is where police centered their operations against the gang itself, the gang used intimidation tactics, murder, and other forms of violence and aggression in the Broadway Market area in order to control what it also called its "turf". In 2015 there were many heavy crackdowns against the gang by police which included the arresting of 12 members of LRGP in which most were arrested in the Broadway-Fillmore area and one being arrested in South Buffalo in which some were guarding what it claimed as its territory in order to continue to host drug dealing operations in the area with one member of the gang, Augustus Kidd, turning themselves in to the Buffalo Police Department. Also in 2015, a woman who was a member of the LRGP admitted to assisting a murder of a Bailey Boys member in 2011 which was in the recent spike of gang arrests in Buffalo.

In 2016, the gang was considered disbanded due to the numerous crackdowns and some gang members turning themselves in to police and also due to the fact that many shootings and attacks done by the gang has desisted. The gang was formally recognized as defunct by the United States Attorney for the Western District of New York, William J. Hochul Jr., as he said:

Thanks to this prosecution, numerous murderers- including a woman who lured a victim to his death - have been brought to justice, and multiple acts of violence solved. Most importantly, justice for the victims and residents alike have been served. And as is the case with federal RICO prosecutions brought by this Office, the gang no longer exists.

— William J. Hochul Jr.
