= 7th Street Gang =

- Founded: 2000
- Years active: 2000–2017
- Territory: Western Buffalo
- Ethnicity: Mainly Hispanic
- Allies: Latin Kings
- Rivals: 10th Street Gang

7th Street Gang was a gang based in Buffalo, New York, specifically the West Side of the city. The gang participated in the illegal drug trade of cocaine, heroin, and other narcotics and has participated in violence in the city. They were heated rivals of the 10th Street Gang. They were repeatedly victimized by their rivals in many neighborhood battles.

== History ==
The gang was established in 2000 by Efrain “Cheko” Hidalgo after he got his friends and family to participate in the illegal drug trade in Buffalo, he called this clique "Cheko's Crew". He joined in a coalition with the local 7th Street Gang after being able to prove himself a formidable force in the drug trade. He became the leader of the gang not long after the merging of the organizations. This came to the attention of the Federal Bureau of Investigation's Safe Streets Task Force, especially after the surge of violence in the West Side of Buffalo with the 10th Street Gang. During this rivalry, violence surged heavily in 2009 when many shootings occurred due to it and with many innocent bystanders were caught in crossfire.

A family member of Efrain Hidalgo, 31-year-old Uda Hidalgo, plead guilty to violating the Racketeer Influenced and Corrupt Organizations Act before United States District Court for the Western District of New York Judge Richard J. Arcara in 2015. Assistant U.S. Attorney Joseph M. Tripi, who was handling the case, stated that between 2000 and 2012, Uda Hildalgo was a member of the Cheko’s Crew/7th Street Gang which was responsible for drug trafficking and violent crime on Buffalo’s West Side. During this time, Uda Hildalgo participated with others in the murder of 10th Street Gang associate Eric Morrow. Uda Hildalgo provided one of the firearms used by other gang members to shoot and kill Morrow on Aug. 11, 2009.

In 2017, 18 members of the 7th Street Gang were arrested and charged with the murder or conspiracy of the murder of Raquan Lloyd. These members included Efrain Hidalgo, the leader of the 7th Street Gang. Two men from the 7th Street Gang, including Hidalgo himself, went into the residence of Lloyd and shot and killed him on November 6, 2008 according to the acting United States Attorney General for the Western District of New York at the time, James P. Kennedy Jr.
