= Monterey County Jail =

- U.S. National Register of Historic Places
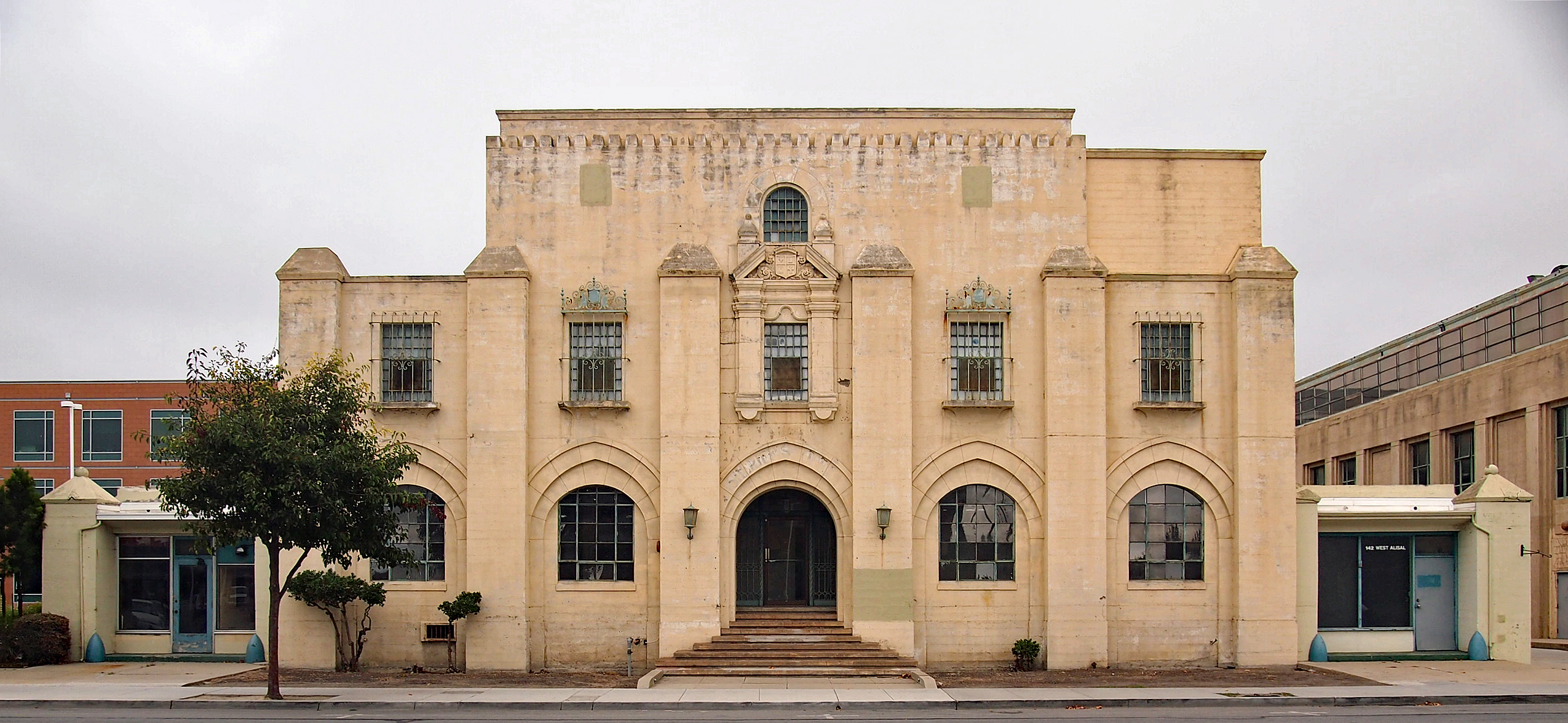
- Monterey County Jail from the south

- Location within California Location within the United States
- Location: 142 W. Alisal Street, Salinas, California
- Coordinates: 36°40′24″N 121°39′34″W
- Built: 1931
- NRHP reference No.: 03000337
- Added to NRHP: September 24, 2004

The Monterey County Jail is a jail in Salinas, California, United States. Built in 1931, it was listed on the National Register of Historic Places in 2004.

Cesar Chavez was imprisoned at the jail, raising national attention for the Salinas Valley lettuce boycott and affirming the legal use of boycotts as an organizing model.
