= Hermanos de Pistoleros Latinos =

Mexican-American prison and street gang

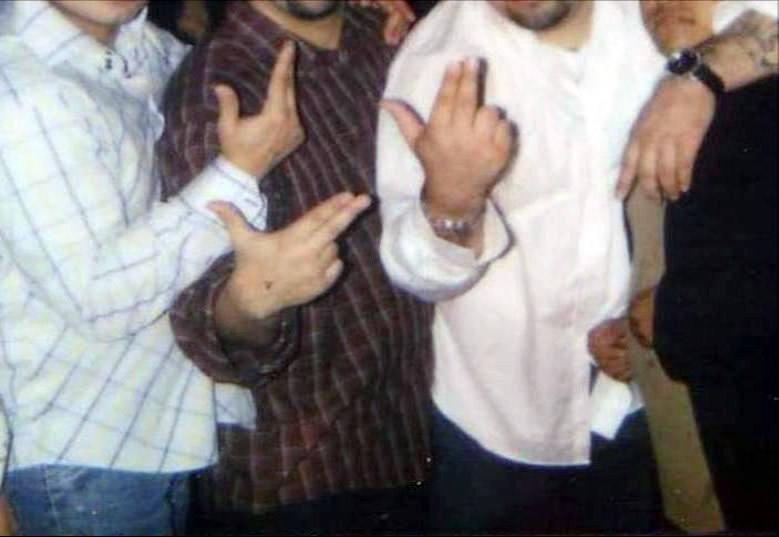
- HPL members use hand signals
- Founded: 1980s
- Founding location: Texas Department of Criminal Justice
- Years active: 1980s–present
- Territory: Texas and Mexico
- Ethnicity: Latinos
- Membership (est.): Over 1,000
- Activities: Drug trafficking

Hermanos Pistoleros Latinos (HPL) is a Mexican American prison gang founded by Chino Avitia in Texas during the early 1980s. The English translation of the gang's name is "Brotherhood of Latin Gunmen". It operates in all Texas prisons and on the streets in many communities in Texas, particularly in Laredo. HPL is active throughout Mexico with its largest contingent in Nuevo Laredo. The gang is structured and is estimated to have over 1,000 members. Members maintain close ties to several Mexican drug trafficking organizations and are involved in the trafficking of large quantities of cocaine and marijuana from Mexico into the United States for distribution.

== Criminal activities ==
The Pistoleros Latinos began to grow in the 1990s after the gang began recruiting members from cities outside of the Rio Grande Valley. The original HPL members from the valley resented the new members being recruited from San Antonio and Houston. A power struggle within the prison gang's ranks ensued causing the group to splinter into two separate chapters. The original HPL members decided to call themselves the HPL 45s, while the San Antonio and Houston members were known as the 16/12s. The two factions went to war and finally reunited under the name HPL in 1998.

Miguel Angel Parades, an HPL member from San Antonio, was executed on 28 October 2014, for his role in the murders of three people in 2000.

In 2024, 24 members of the HPL were indicted in San Antonio on charges of drug and firearm trafficking.
