= Columbia Point Dawgs =

U.S. criminal organization and street gang

- Weapons and cash seized from members of CPD.
- Founded: 1988
- Founding location: Boston, Massachusetts
- Years active: 1980s–present
- Territory: United States of America, Boston
- Ethnicity: Primarily African American
- Membership (est.): 100+
- Criminal activities: Drug trafficking, robbery and murder
- Allies: Dudley Street Park, Mission Hill, H-Block, Draper Street, Dorchester Ave Mavericks
- Rivals: Orchard Park Trailblazers, Ashmont, Mt. Pleasant, Johnston Rd. Lenox Street Boys, Heath st

Columbia Point Dawgs, also called CPD, is a criminal organization and street gang located in Boston. They are involved in murder, drug trafficking and violence. Columbia Point Dawgs are known to wear the Philadelphia Phillies logo or Pittsburgh Pirates hats. Known for driving expensive vehicles and spending an abundance of money at clubs venues and having one of the biggest drug operations in New England.

== History ==
The gang was named after the Columbia Point Public Housing Project apartment complex built in 1954 and razed in the 1980s to make way for the mixed income Harbor Point on the Bay apartment community located on the Columbia Point peninsula of the Dorchester neighborhood of Boston. The Columbia Point Housing Project had been reported as the most dangerous public housing projects in Boston.

In the early 1990s, the CPD was largely run by four families, all of which have descendants among the Targets in this case: the Williams family, the Woods family, the Berry family, and the Funches family. Members of the CPD, then and now, often identified themselves by wearing Major League Baseball clothing and caps depicting the colors and logos of the Pittsburgh Pirates (Black and Gold) and the Philadelphia Phillies (Red and White), with both logos used to identify the "Point" Columbia Point.

On September 28, 1995, Bobby Brown was in Boston to visit friends and family. While in Boston, Bobby Brown and his friend Steven Sealey went to visit a local night club near Orchard Park in the Roxbury neighborhood of Boston. A man rumored to be affiliated with the Orchard Park Trailblazers jumped out and shot Sealey three times while he was seated in Whitney Houston's Bentley with her husband, Bobby Brown and then ran into the Orchard Park Projects.

The CPD expanded its drug trafficking business through southern Massachusetts, establishing strongholds in Brockton and Fall River, Southern New Hampshire, and Southern Maine.

In June 2015, 48 members of Columbia Point Dawgs were arrested and charged on gun and drug charges after a two-year investigation in which Vincent Lisi, special agent in charge of Bostons FBI office said “It is one of, if not the largest, gang takedowns that we’ve seen in Boston — to arrest the most dangerous subjects out there,”.

On February 1, 2017, assumed CPD leader, Willie Berry, a/k/a “Sco”, a/k/a “Scodough” plead guilty to Conspiracy to Distribute Cocaine Base, Cocaine, Heroin, and Oxycodone, in violation of 21 U.S.C. § 846 (Count One) and on April 26, 2017, was sentenced to a term of 132 months (11 years) incarceration, and 5 years of supervised release. Within a year, a Rule 35 was filed after Berry agreed to testify against fellow Columbia Point Dawg member Joseph Benson in the 2009 murder of Louis Joseph Jr. Willie Berry's "Queen for a Day" or "proffer" letter was listed in the government's exhibit list. Willie Berry's sentence was reduced after Joseph Benson was successfully convicted and Berry is now scheduled to be released on April 23, 2019.

In April 2026, a seven-month multi-agency federal investigation resulted in an indictment against eight members and associates of the Columbia Point Dawgs and the allied Johnston Road gang.

== See also ==
- Four Corner Hustlers
- Lucerne Street Doggz
