= Savage Nomads =

American street gang

- Founded: August 5th, 1970
- Founder: Benjamin Melendez (Founder); Benjamin Buxton (Supreme President)
- Founding location: New York City
- Years active: 50 years
- Territory: The Bronx, New York and Hartford, Connecticut
- Ethnicity: Mostly African American and Puerto Rican
- Activities: Small crime, street-level drug dealing, extortion
- Rivals: Seven Immortals, Savage Skulls
- Notable members: Iran Nazario

The Savage Nomads were a mostly Puerto Rican and African American street gang started in the South Bronx area of The Bronx, New York during the late 1960s, gaining popularity in the 1970s. The gang was involved in a number of running battles with rival gangs Seven Immortals, Savage Skulls, and the Dirty Dozen. The Savage Nomads were alleged to be involved in numerous small crime activities in the New York City area.

== History ==
The Savage Nomads were founded on August 5th, 1970 by Benjamin Melendez, who was nicknamed "Yellow Benji". The members were mostly Puerto Rican and African American, but they had one teenage Jewish girl. One notable member is Iran Nazario, who was convicted to 27 years for a drive-by shooting and firebombing.

Like the Savage Skulls, gang members would appropriate Nazi symbolism to project "how menacing and terrible they were." This included wearing swastikas, wearing Nazi helmets and having positions called "Gestapo" within the gang's ranks.

In 2017, after many Savage Nomads members were released from prison, the gang made a resurgence, with 2 homicides being linked to them.

== In popular culture ==
In 1979, the gang was one of many featured in the documentary film 80 Blocks from Tiffany's.

== See also ==
- Universal Zulu Nation
- Black Spades
