= Red Skin Kingz =

Red Skin Kingz RSK
- Founded: 2003
- Founding location: Lukachukai, Arizona
- Territory: Eastern side of the Navajo Nation
- Ethnicity: Native American
- Leader: Devan Edward Leonard
- Activities: – drug trafficking – carjacking – kidnapping – murder
- Notable members: Kyle Filbert Gray; Lucille Jean Leonard

Red Skin Kingz is a former (Note: According to official estimate by law enforcement, the gang is most likely dismantled.) native-only street gang that operated in the United States. They are sometimes abbreviated as RSK. The organized gang has been characterized by law enforcement as being immensely violent. The group acted in various illegal activities, such as drug trafficking, carjacking, kidnapping and murder. Members of the Red Skin Kingz acted predominantly in Lukachukai and other nearby places.
