= Bailey Boys =

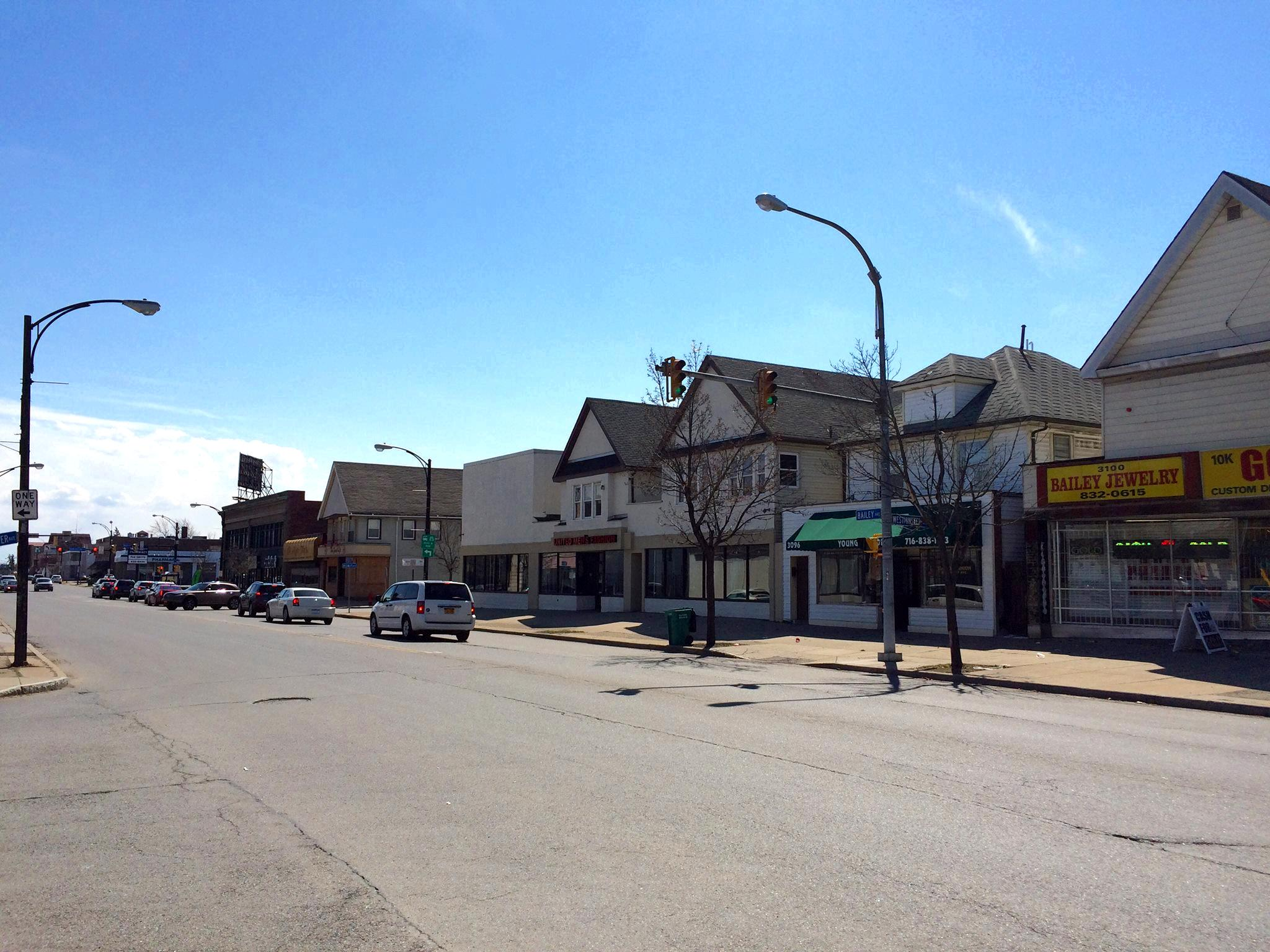
- Bailey Avenue from the corner of Westminster Avenue, toward Kensington Avenue
- Founded: 2011
- Territory: Bailey Avenue to Main Street
- Ethnicity: Primarily African American
- Allies: Crips
- Rivals: LRGP; Milla Gangsta Bloods

Bailey Boys is a street gang based in Buffalo, New York in the Kensington, Buffalo and surrounding neighborhoods and was established around 2011. The gang is known for crimes of murder, robbery, and many different types of racketeering including drug trafficking.

== History ==
The Bailey Boys was founded in 2011 by several people, the gang was named after the street Bailey Avenue which stretches from downtown Buffalo and up to the lower areas of Amherst, New York and was also called the "most feared gang in Buffalo". The gang started earning infamy and notoriety after a shooting in Martin Luther King Jr. Park in 2012 near Genesse Street and Best Street, this was done spearheaded by Tariq Brown and it was realized afterwards that the gang's territory expanded to the areas of Winspear Avenue, the Kensington Expressway, Eggert Road and Main Street. In the same year, another member of the gang by the name of Raymel Weeden would shoot and kill Fred Rozier on February, which in 2018, he would plead guilty to the murder. A year after this shooting, the gang as a collective would be charged with "rampant" drug dealing, four murders, and 14 attempted murders.

In 2018, the leader of the Bailey Boys, Kenneth Pettway Jr., was arrested by federal agents for drug conspiracy and violations of the Racketeer Influenced and Corrupt Organizations Act. He supplied narcotics including crack cocaine, heroin and cannabis even beforehand warrants were executed in which federal agents searched for drugs and drug paraphernalia on January 18, 2012. Around 14 Bailey Boys have been indicted, including Kenneth himself.
