= Orchard Park Trailblazers =

Boston street gang

- Founded: Late-1980s
- Founding location: Boston, Massachusetts
- Years active: 1980s–present
- Territory: United States of America, Massachusetts, Boston
- Ethnicity: Primarily African American
- Membership (est.): 50+
- Criminal activities: Drug trafficking, robbery and murder
- Allies: Mission Hill
- Rivals: Columbia Point Dawgs, H Block, Dudley Park, Mt. Pleasant, Ruggles Street

The Orchard Park Trailblazers is a street gang in the Roxbury area of Boston. The gang was mostly active in the early 1990s and became infamous for violence. They are bitter rivals of the Columbia Point Dawgs. Both gangs have been feuding on the streets of Boston for nearly 30 years.

== History ==
The Orchard Park Trailblazers originated in the former Orchard Park Projects in the 1970s. It was not until the late-1980s that the gang began to participate in criminal activities such as robbery and drug trafficking. The Boston Police Department began to track the Trailblazers in the early-1990s and cracked down on the gang in the mid-2000s.

=== 1997 indictment ===
On April 11, 1997, fourteen members of the Orchard Park Trailblazers were charged in federal criminal complaints with conspiring to distribute and distributing crack cocaine. Two additional members of the gang were charged with state drug offenses. The sixteen defendants were arrested in a coordinated series of raids in Roxbury and Dorchester by federal, state, and local law enforcement.

=== 2004 raid ===
On June 23, 2004, 15 Trailblazers were arrested and charged after a 24-hour raid. All of the men were charged and sent to prison.
