= Los Solidos =

Street gang from Hartford, Connecticut

- Founded: Early 1990s
- Founder: Lawrence Beauvais
- Founding location: Hartford, Connecticut
- Years active: Early 1990s—present
- Ethnicity: Puerto Ricans, Hispanic and Latino Americans
- Activities: sale of drugs and weapons, murders, robbery
- Rivals: Latin Kings
- Notable members: Iran Nazario

Los Solidos is a street gang started in the early 1990s and based in Hartford, Connecticut. The gang also operates in other northeastern cities such as Springfield, Massachusetts.

== History ==
Los Solidos was founded by Lawrence Beauvais from the remains of two other gangs that merged to help defend themselves against larger gangs such as the Latin Kings. Following the 1993-1994 feud with the Latin Kings, the President of the Puerto Rican street gang, Jorge Rivera, was given 13 concurrent life sentences for four murders, drug trafficking, and other offenses which subsequently severely disrupted gang activities and operations. Then in the early 2000s, the gang began regrouping, reforming and in 2008 was featured on an episode of Gangland. In January 2008, high-ranking member Trevis "Bones" Dailey was arrested for the murder of a rival gang member while on parole for the homicide of a Latin Kings member in 1994. Then in 2015, dozens of members were arrested in a sweep on various gang-related charges involving weapons and drug sales. In 2016, Los Solidos member Angel Carrasquillo was sentenced to 80 years for a double murder over drug sales in Solidos territory.

As of 2019, the Los Solidos are still active on the streets of Hartford, Connecticut, Springfield, Massachusetts and throughout the northeast United States with a growing presence as a result of its members some high ranking being released from long term incarceration trafficking weapons, drugs and promoting prostitution and other violent gang-related activities. In March 2020, a member of Los Solidos pleaded guilty in federal court to drugs and weapons charges then on April 8, 2020 several additional members were arrested and charged with drug trafficking, distribution and weapons charges stemming from early morning joint FBI, Hartford Police task force raids across the city. In February 2021, high ranking member Elias Guzman was sentenced to 5 years in Federal prison for drug trafficking.

In March 2026, Lawrence Beauvais, the founder of the Los Solidos, was arrested in North Attleboro, Massachusetts, for allegedly robbing Putali Kunwar, an employee of a salon in Central Falls, Rhode Island, before stabbing her to death. Beauvais was charged with first-degree homicide and first-degree robbery.
