= Vatos Locos =

Mexican-American slang

'Vatos Locos' sign

Vatos Locos is a Chicano slang term that means "crazy Dudes". It is also used as the name of multiple small gangs around the USA, Canada and Mexico. Many "Vatos Locos" use the colors red, black, green, or brown.

The film Blood In Blood Out (1993) which was written by poet Jimmy Santiago Baca, is based on the experiences of gang members of a fictional gang called Vatos Locos.

The video game Call of Juarez: The Cartel features a fictional Vatos Locos gang.

== See also ==
- List of gangs in Mexico
