= Culver City Boys =

Mexican-American street gang

Culver City 13
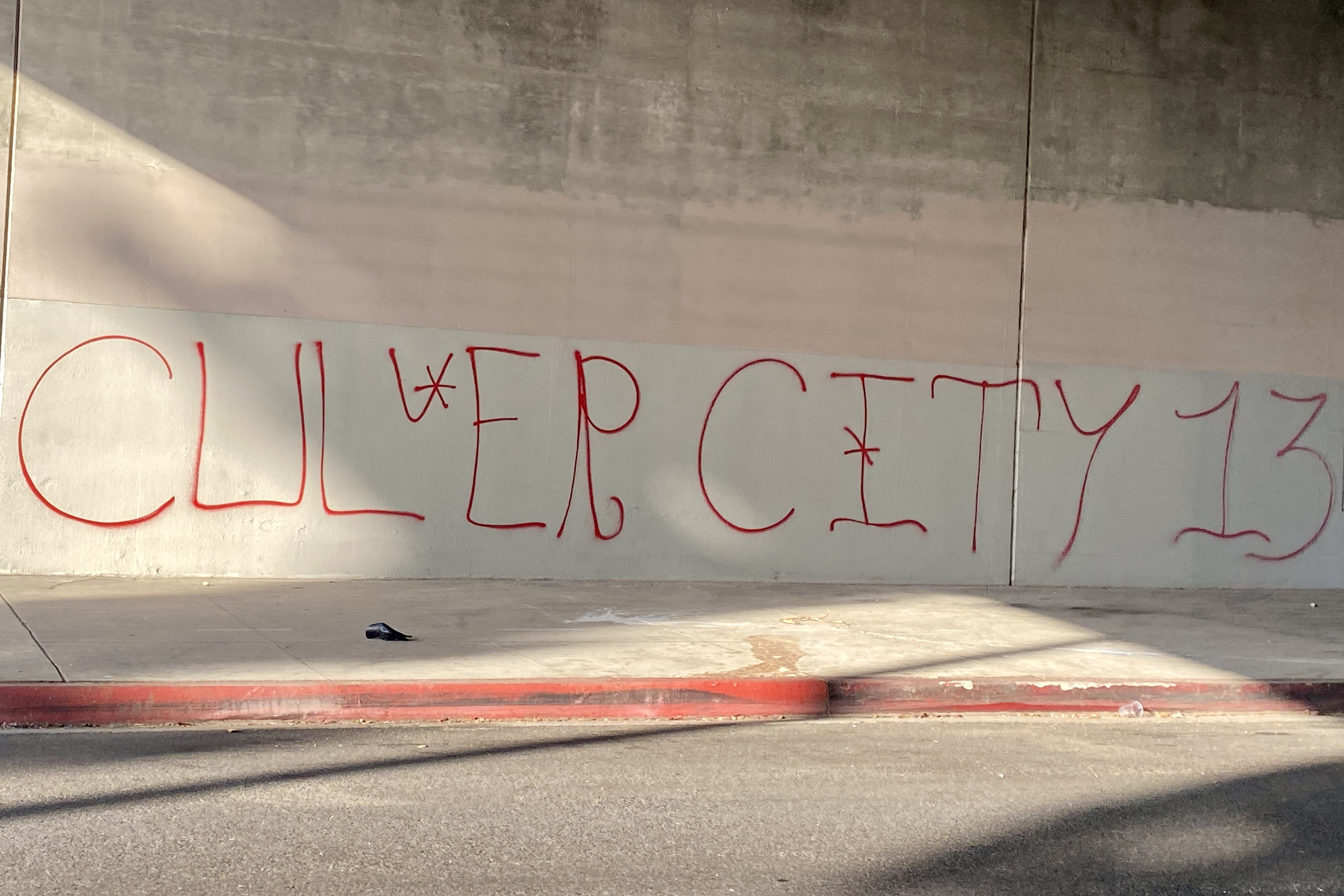
- Culver City Boys tag under the 405 Freeway
- Founding location: Culver City, California, United States
- Years active: 1940s-present
- Territory: Los Angeles Westside
- Ethnicity: Mexican American
- Activities: Murder, drug trafficking, extortion, assault, auto theft, robbery
- Allies: Mexican Mafia
- Rivals: Santa Monica 13; 18th Street Gang; Venice Shoreline Crips Venice 13 Inglewood 13 Lennox 13

Culver City Boys or Culver City 13 (CXC13) is a Mexican-American street gang from Culver City, Mar Vista, Los Angeles, California.

According to a Los Angeles City Beat article, by 2003, many Culver City Boys left the Mar Vista Gardens housing projects due to strict rules that evict gang members and increased police presence. The gang is under a civil injunction enforced by the LAPD which restricts gang members' activity within a defined boundary surrounding the projects. However, the gang remains active, as the constitutionality of the injunction has been tested. Alleged members of the gang settled a class action suit over the practice of enforcing curfews for suspected gang members with the city of Los Angeles for $30 million towards job training and apprenticeships.
