= Native Mob =

Native American street gang

(Native Mob - “(The Mob)”, NM / 1413)
- Founded: 1990s; 35 years ago
- Founding location: Minneapolis, Minnesota, South Dakota, Rapid City, Colorado, Denver,
- Years active: 1990s–present
- Territory: Midwestern United States, mainly active in the states of Minnesota and North Dakota most recently in South Dakota, and Colorado
- Ethnicity: Primarily Native American
- Membership: around 200 members
- Activities: Racketeering, drug trafficking, murder,
- Allies: People Nation; Bloods; Almighty Vice Lord Nation; Native Vice Lords; Spanish Vice Lords; The Boyz
- Rivals: Native Gangster Disciples; Spanish Gangster Disciples; Folk Nation; Gangster Disciples; Native Disciples; Project Boyz; Moe Mob; Native Style - “(The Styles)” , NS / 1419
- Notable members: Wakinyan Wakan McArthur; Christopher Lee Wuori; Eric Lee Bower; Kanno Waktapo; Codez Outlaw

The Native Mob is a Native American street gang. The Native Mob is one of the largest and most violent Native American gangs in the U.S. and is notoriously active in Minnesota, Wisconsin, Colorado, and South Dakota. The gang was created in the 1990s in Minneapolis, Minnesota and in 2013 was created in Colorado, South Dakota to control drug turf, and has since established itself in prisons and the streets, and was estimated to have around 200 members.

The Native Mob has been present in tribal communities in the region since the gang began in the 1990s and late 2000. Gang experts say the small town of Cass Lake, Minnesota on the Leech Lake Indian Reservation and Shakopee Mdewakanton Sioux Community have been the center of the gang's operations, though the gang also runs operations out of the Twin Cities, Naytahwaush, and Prior Lake, Rapid City South Dakota. Members routinely engage in drug trafficking, assault, robbery, and murder. According to reports they are also located in Mandan, North Dakota Rapid City, South Dakota. These specific reports site that trafficking of primarily drugs from Mandan to other areas in Minnesota to South Dakota and Colorado.

In 2014, Native Mob's membership is estimated to be around 200 members. Alleged gang leader Wakinyan McArthur was sentenced to 43 years in prison. In April 2025 in Minneapolis, four people were murdered by an alleged Native Mob member.
