= Dominicans Don't Play =

Dominican-American street gang

- Founded: 1991; 35 years ago
- Founding location: Washington Heights, Manhattan, New York City, New York, United States
- Years active: 1991–present
- Territory: New York, New Jersey, Madrid, Florida, Massachusetts
- Ethnicity: Dominican American
- Activities: Drug trafficking, robbery, extortion, murder
- Rivals: Bloods; Trinitarios; Latin Kings

Dominicans Don't Play (143) is a Dominican-American street gang which formed in Manhattan, New York, in 1991. They are known for primarily using machetes and knives as weapons. DDP is located across New York City, particularly in the Bronx, Harlem and the Lower East Side. They are also located in New Jersey, cities such as like Union City, North Bergen, Paterson, Passaic, Bayonne, Elizabeth, Jersey City, Perth Amboy, and South Amboy. They are also located overseas in various countries.

== Recruiting ==
Recruiting efforts have been pursued via websites such as YouTube and Myspace as well as in schools. Members have to be at least in their teen years to become active members in the gang.

== Drug trafficking ==
The gang holds a large share of the cocaine market due to an association with the Colombian crime cartel, and as such, many members of the group have been arrested for drug-related crimes. Members have drawn the interest of the U.S. Immigration and Customs Enforcement, and some have faced deportation hearings. The DDP has also drawn the interest of the U.S. Marshals.

Throughout the group's relatively short history as a gang they have been involved in numerous violent altercations in New York, New Jersey, Massachusetts, Florida, Germany, London, Belgium, Dominican Republic, and Spain.

== Notable criminal acts ==
=== Pelham and murder ===
A scuffle between DDP and the Bloods at Pelham Prep High School in the Bronx on March 11, 2005, resulted in the stabbing of two teenage boys.

=== Coney Island arrest ===
A contingent of 47 gang members who were allegedly planning to wreak havoc on the Coney Island Boardwalk were arrested. One gun and 30 machetes were found and confiscated.

=== February 20, 2007 stabbing ===
On February 20, 2007, an 18-year-old boy was stabbed 21 times in Boston's Back Bay MBTA station by a gang of teenagers. The man subsequently quit the gang.

=== Murder of Marviel Martinez ===
On April 13, 2005, 15-year-old Alex Ramirez, a member of the DDP offshoot Bones, was charged with second-degree murder after witnesses said he slashed 17-year-old Marviel Martinez (rival gang member Trinitario) in the neck and then thrust the blade deep in the teen's back Tuesday morning at the Jerome Avenue IRT 183rd Street station.

=== Murder of Mark Tyrell ===
A 16-year-old, Mark Tyrell, was stabbed in March 2007 outside of the Pizzeria in Union Square. Mark Tyrell had gotten into a fight with members of the DDP which forced him to be transferred to Chelsea.

=== December 2006 murder ===
A brutal fight among almost 50 teenagers in Union Square left one teen dead and two others injured. Police Commissioner Kelly said it was a "planned confrontation": Some Washington Irving High School female students were "insulted," so they enlisted their boyfriends at Science Skills High School to defend their honor. Taishawn Bellevue, an aspiring basketball player, was killed during this altercation.

Commissioner Kelly also suggested that the fight was gang-related, as some Washington Irving students are members of DDP - Dominicans Don't Play. Other students who were based at Science Skills could not have been members of a gang. According to an official who spoke to The New York Times, someone whistled to start the fight, and the girls' contingent from Science Skills had 15 people "with no plans for a confrontation and found themselves outnumbered." Police reviewed surveillance footage from a nearby store that captured the fight. Around 50 teens involved used belts, pieces of wood, and bats during the altercation. 16-year-old Francisco Baez was charged with murder, gang assault and criminal possession of a weapon. after two people picked him out of a line up. He later confessed to the crime as a result of being identified.

=== Other incidents ===
In 2004, several people associated with DDP were arrested in connection with the fatal stabbing of a River Edge, New Jersey man after the North Hudson Dominican Day Parade in August 2003. They have had an ongoing feud with other area gangs, including the sets affiliated with the United Blood Nation and the Trinitarios, a group comprised also of Dominican youths. There was a recent arrest of three members of the DDP by the FBI.

On January 1, 2007, 3 members of the gang DDP were arrested in New York City. They were wanted for multiple charges relating to a shooting incident at a restaurant in which the three subjects fired several rounds killing one person and critically injuring three. They were arrested in NY with a .38 caliber hand gun. Other incidents include a large brawl in Manhattan's Union Square.

There have been incidents of individuals who have been attacked with machetes after being asked if they were members of the DDP. Some attacks have been deadly.

== Potential for expansion ==
They are currently the second largest gang of Dominican descent behind the Trinitarios gang. The group has limited potential for nationwide expansion and is largely confined to areas with significant Dominican populations, in particular Washington Heights Florida, Atlanta, Boston and New Jersey. It is the fastest growing gang in the Bronx, and among the largest in New Jersey. They are considered to have the largest concentration of Dominicans of any neighborhood in the United States, combined population of Dominicans residing in New York and New Jersey totals around 1.2 out of an overall US Dominican population of 2.3 million as of 2001.

== In other countries ==
=== Spain ===
On March 7, 2006, Spanish police in Madrid noted a growing gang presence of the DDP. Spanish police report 130 documented DDP members, making them the largest in Spain. DDP is the largest and most violent street gang in Spain. The gang has become one of the most prominent gangs in Madrid. On November 5, 2009, Spanish security forces arrested 40 DDP members, all of them between 16 and 29 years old. The security forces confiscated 5 guns, one grenade, one machete, ammo, 3 baseball bats, 400 grams of cocaine, and 200.000 euros in cash. As of 2021, DDP is still active in Spain, where they have recently murdered an 18 year old rapper with Asperger and schizophrenia. The Spanish Inner Affairs Ministry has record of 620 youngster gangs operating in Spain, of which 88 are Latin. Only in Madrid, the Spanish Police has record of 400 active gangsters (2500 on the national record).

== Gang rivalries ==
The Trinitarios are DDP's biggest rival gang since the early 2000s, they were once united in the 1990s. They also are at peace with the Latin Kings, a Puerto Rican-based gang who has had previous problems with their rivals the Trinitarios. The gang also has an ongoing rivalry with anyone who is or has an association with their rivals the Trinitarios.

== See also ==
- Crime in the Dominican Republic
- Crime in New York City
- List of gangs in the United States
