= Trinitarios =

Dominican-American criminal organization

- Founded: 1993; 33 years ago
- Founders: Leonides Sierra and Julio Marine
- Founding location: Rikers Island, New York City, US
- Years active: 1993–present
- Territory: United States: New York City, Houston; United Kingdom: London; Spain: Madrid; Dominican Republic
- Ethnicity: Predominantly Dominican American
- Membership (est.): Over 3,000 in the Eastern area of the United States
- Activities: Drug trafficking, assault, murder, robbery, extortion
- Rivals: Crips; Dominicans Don't Play; Tiny Rascal Gang

The Trinitarios is a Dominican American criminal organization founded in New York City in 1993. They were described by the US Justice Department in 2009 as lower-level distributors and one of "the smaller Dominican criminal groups and street gangs", although larger and more structured than the "hundreds of small, unaffiliated neighborhood gangs" in the New York - New Jersey HIDTA.

== History ==
The Trinitarios were established in 1993 on Rikers Island, the New York City jail, by two Dominicans facing separate murder charges—Leonides "Junito" Sierra and Julio "Caballo" Marine. The Trinitarios on the East Coast was built in Rikers Island prison to protect mainly Dominicans and other Hispanic nationalities from African American gangs or other American gangs. This Dominican gang is considered to be the first Latino gang that originated in New York City and then later spread out to the whole northeastern region of United States. The group was named for three revolutionaries of the Dominican War of Independence; its slogan is Dios, patria y libertad (the official motto of the Dominican Republic, "God, homeland and liberty"). Their colors are lime green, as well as red, blue, and white (the colors of the Dominican Republic flag).

The group suffered a major blow in 2009, as the U.S. Attorney's Office for the Southern District of New York dismantled the group through a series of prosecutions. In 2011, 50 members and associates of the Bronx Trinitarios Gang (BTG) were charged with federal racketeering, narcotics and firearms offenses. Forty-one defendants were charged with a racketeering conspiracy under the Racketeer Influenced and Corrupt Organizations Act (RICO) in connection to alleged participation in a criminal enterprise that included narcotics trafficking, murder and attempted murder.

In 2014, the Trinitarios' co-founder and former leader, Sierra, was sentenced to 19 years in prison for the racketeering conspiracy, to run consecutively with a 22½ year to life sentence in New York that Sierra was already serving as a result of his 1989 murder conviction. Some 140 other members, including Sierra's chief lieutenants, were also convicted and received lengthy prison sentences.

Later, however, the group had a resurgence. Internal factions of the Trinitarios have battled with one another, beginning in 2011, when a leader of a Sunset Park, Brooklyn, chapter of the Trinitarios attempted to expand to the Bronx without authorization. The gang war that ensued intensified in 2018, with several shootings.

In February 2025, federal authorities announced that they had arrested 22 reputed members and associates of the gang on a federal racketeering indictment charge that includes six murders that took place in the Massachusetts cities of Lynn and Lawrence between 2017 and 2023. Federal prosecutors allege that the Trinitarios were involved in racketeering since at least 2019 in several Massachusetts cities including Boston, Malden, Salem, Haverhill, Peabody, Middleton and the aforementioned cities of Lynn and Lawrence. In addition, it is alleged that the gang operates a lucrative drug trade in Manchester, New Hampshire and the state of Maine.

== Membership, organization, and criminal activities ==
In 2011, a New York City Police Department estimated that there were 3,181 Trinitarios in the city, about 5% of the total number of members of New York gangs. Their numbers grew rapidly around 2007–2008, but later remained stabilized. The gang operates mainly in New York and New Jersey, with activities in Upper Manhattan, the Bronx, Queens, Albany and Long Island. It also has a presence elsewhere in the Eastern Seaboard of the United States, including Rhode Island, Georgia, Massachusetts, Pennsylvania, Maryland, Texas, Florida, as well as Tennessee. In Spain, membership of the Trinitarios is predominantly Dominican, but also Bolivian, Colombian and Spanish. Such Latin American gangs spread to Spain as a result of mass deportations from the United States of Latin American immigrants with criminal records.

The Trinitarios are known for their high degree of organization, including a hierarchical structure, as well as for their use of brutal violence. Testimony given against Trinitarios in court indicated that "one needs a sponsor to join, and once in, new members receive a rule book, take an oath and swear to abide by the gang's constitution." The gang's "weapon of choice" is the machete, but members also carry baseball bats, guns, and knives. Criminal activities perpetrated by Trinitarios include drug dealing, in heroin and cocaine, as well as assaults and home invasions. The Trinitarios have infiltrated schools as a recruiting ground.

== Notable crimes committed by members ==
Three Trinitarios members, including the Primera (leader) of the gang's Rhode Island chapter, were indicted by a federal grand jury on firearms and drug charges on August 25, 2010, after being captured on an undercover Federal Bureau of Investigation (FBI) videotape attending an organizational meeting in Providence. A fourth member was charged on state firearm charges.

Seven Barcelona-based members were convicted of using a kitchen knife to carve a fifty centimeter "X" into the back of a gang member deemed a traitor for associating with MS-13 on March 21, 2012. During the trial, the Trinitarios were designated a criminal organization which allowed heavier sentences to be imposed upon the perpetrators and the gang's leaders. On the same day as the ruling – May 11, 2014 – a brawl occurred in Madrid involving Trinitarios and Ñetas, leading to the arrests of twenty-six gang members.

In June 2018, a Trinitario gang member from Haverhill, Massachusetts, was arrested for the murder of a rival Gangster Disciples member. A Haverhill detective wrote that the arrests were in connection with an ongoing feud (a gang war) between the Trinitarios and their rivals, the Gangster Disciples, that had resulted in multiple shootings."

In August 2018 several Trinitarios gang members were arrested for shooting at a house in Lawrence, Massachusetts. A Trinitarios gang member was arrested in January 2019 for the shooting of a 16-year-old girl in Lawrence.

In November 2019, in Massachusetts, 18 Trinitarios were among 32 arrested in "Operation Emerald Crush." The operation involved more than 70 federal, state and local officers who carried out the arrests of suspects alleged to have sold massive amounts of firearms and drugs including cocaine, fentanyl, heroin and crack cocaine with an estimated street value of $120,000. Authorities confiscated 79 firearms in the operation. Out of the 79 guns, which came in from out of state, 17 were stolen and at least two were used in shootings. In one case, undercover officers were able to buy 27 guns in one transaction.

In April 2024, the Essex County District Attorney's Office in Massachusetts said 121 indictments were levied against known members and associates of the Trinitarios for numerous crimes across the state.

On June 8, 2026, Federal prosecutors in Massachusetts announced RICO-related charges against 26 members and associates of the Trinitarios. It is alleged that the gang is responsible for five murders and 19 attempted murders in the state.

=== Murder of Lesandro Guzman-Feliz (2018) ===
On June 20, 2018, in the Bronx, 15-year-old Lesandro "Junior" Guzman-Feliz left his apartment to loan a friend five dollars. Guzman-Feliz was a member of the New York City Police Department (NYPD) Explorers program, a group for youths interested in law enforcement careers, and aspired to become a detective. A faction of Trinitarios mistakenly believed that Guzman-Feliz was a member of a rival gang and entered a bodega where Guzman-Feliz was seeking shelter, dragged him onto the sidewalk in front of the store, and beat him and stabbed him with machetes and large knives. The murder was captured by security cameras and mobile phone videos.

The murder outraged the public, and video footage of the murder went viral. In June 2019, five Trinitarios were convicted of first-degree murder and other charges, including conspiracy and gang assault, in the murder. Two gang members who participated in the attack testified for the prosecution, revealing the inner workings of the gang. After the verdict was rendered, one of the killers shouted, "¡Popote, hasta la muerte!" ("Trinitarios until death"). In July 2022, a leader of a 'subset' or faction of the gang, as well as his second in command, were convicted of murder for ordering the killing. In total, twelve of the suspects were convicted of killing Lesandro and sent to prison, where one of them died and 11 remain; 1 more was convicted of "conspiracy" and sentenced to time served, and a 13th had all charges dropped. The last two received leniency in exchange for turning state's witness.
