= Venice Shoreline Crips =

American street gang

The Venice Shoreline Crips (VSLC) is a "set" of the Crips gang alliance based out of Venice, Los Angeles, California.

== History ==
The Venice Shoreline Crips formed in Venice's Oakwood neighborhood, which was originally labeled as a "servant's zone" by Venice founder Abbot Kinney and was one of the few places within a mile of California's coastline where blacks could own property. Due to restrictive covenants that enforced racial segregation, Oakwood was set aside as a settlement area for blacks and the population increased rapidly as hundreds moved to Venice to work in the oil fields during the 1930s and 1940s. Into the 1950s, Los Angeles had neglected Oakwood so much that it became known as "the ghetto by the sea" with unpaved narrow streets leading to run-down bungalows, many of which lacked foundations.

While unemployment soared with the closing of the oil fields, the 1960s brought drugs and racial tensions to Oakwood and gang membership began to rise among the already established Venice 13 gang. Inspired by the Black Power Movement and after a series of militant black riots in Venice in the late 1960s the Shoreline Crips were founded alongside some of the original Crip gangs formed by Tookie Williams and Raymond Washington in South Central Los Angeles. In the 1980s as crack cocaine was introduced and gangs began focusing more on money rather than their original politics, the Shoreline Crips became heavily involved in the narcotics business in Oakwood and on the Venice Boardwalk as well.

Leading into the 1990s, gunfire was heard nightly as the Shorelines warred with rival Culver City 13 after Shoreline cliques were pushed out of the Mar Vista Gardens projects. Shortly after, Oakwood exploded with violence as a war broke out between the Shorelines and Venice 13 over control of the Venice drug trade until a cease-fire was arranged between the two gangs. In the 1980s and 1990s, newly arrived white homeowners took residency in and around the area, causing Los Angeles to combat the gang problem. Although even after a series of raids, injunctions, and other measures against them, the Shorelines have maintained a steady control over their territory with their numbers ranging in the several hundreds.

== Notoriety ==
In November 1980, a Venice Crip member was arrested for the murder of Sarai Ribicoff, niece of Senator Abraham Ribicoff, in a robbery outside a Washington Blvd restaurant.

The war with the Culver City Boyz spilled into the lives of many people not affiliated with gangs as bystanders and parents began being shot.
