= List of California street gangs =

This is a list of notable criminally-active street gangs operating or formerly operating in California.

To be included in this list, the gang must have a Wikipedia article with references showing it is a California street gang.

== Prison gangs ==
- Aryan Brotherhood
- Black Guerrilla Family
- Fresno Bulldogs
- KUMI 415
- Mexican Mafia
- Nazi Lowriders
- Nuestra Familia
- Public Enemy No. 1

== Street gangs ==
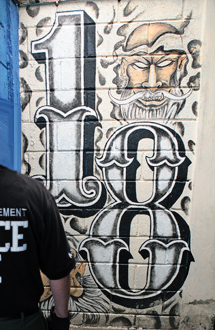
18th Street gang graffiti

- 18th Street gang
- Abergil crime family
- Armenian Power
- Bahala Na Gang
- Bloods
  - Black P. Stones
  - Bounty Hunter Bloods
  - Pirus
- Chosen Few MC
- Crips
  - Asian Boyz
  - Grape Street Watts Crips
  - Rollin' 30s Harlem Crips
  - Rollin 60's Neighborhood Crips
  - Sons of Samoa
  - Tongan Crip Gang
  - Venice Shoreline Crips
- Devils Diciples
- Diablos Motorcycle Club
- Fresno Bulldogs
- Galloping Goose Motorcycle Club
- Gypsy Joker Motorcycle Club
- Hells Angels
- Latin Kings (gang)
- Lopers
- Los Angeles crime family
- Menace of Destruction
- Mongols Motorcycle Club
- Moonshiners Motorcycle Club
- MS-13
- Norteños
- Peckerwood
  - Nazi Lowriders
  - Public Enemy No. 1
- Satanas
- Sinaloa Cartel
  - Beltrán-Leyva Cartel
- Sureños
  - 38th Street gang
  - The Avenues
  - Forming Kaos
  - Azusa 13
  - Culver City Boys 13
  - El Monte Flores
  - Florencia 13
  - Logan Heights Gang
  - OVS
  - Playboys
  - Puente 13
  - Santa Monica 13
  - Río 13
  - Shelltown 38th St
  - Temple Street
  - Toonerville Rifa 13
  - Varrio Nuevo Estrada
  - Venice 13
  - Westside Locos 13
  - White Fence
  - Vineland Boys
- Tiny Rascal Gang
- Triad
  - 14K Triad
  - Bamboo Union
  - Big Circle Gang
  - Black Dragons
  - Four Seas Gang
  - Jackson Street Boys
  - Wah Ching
  - Wo Hop To
  - Wo Shing Wo
- Wilmas 13
- Vagos Motorcycle Club
- Varrio 204th Street
- Yakuza

== See also ==
- List of gangs in Los Angeles, California
- List of gangs in the United States
- List of LASD deputy gangs
- Watts Gang Task Force
