= List of criminal gangs in Los Angeles =

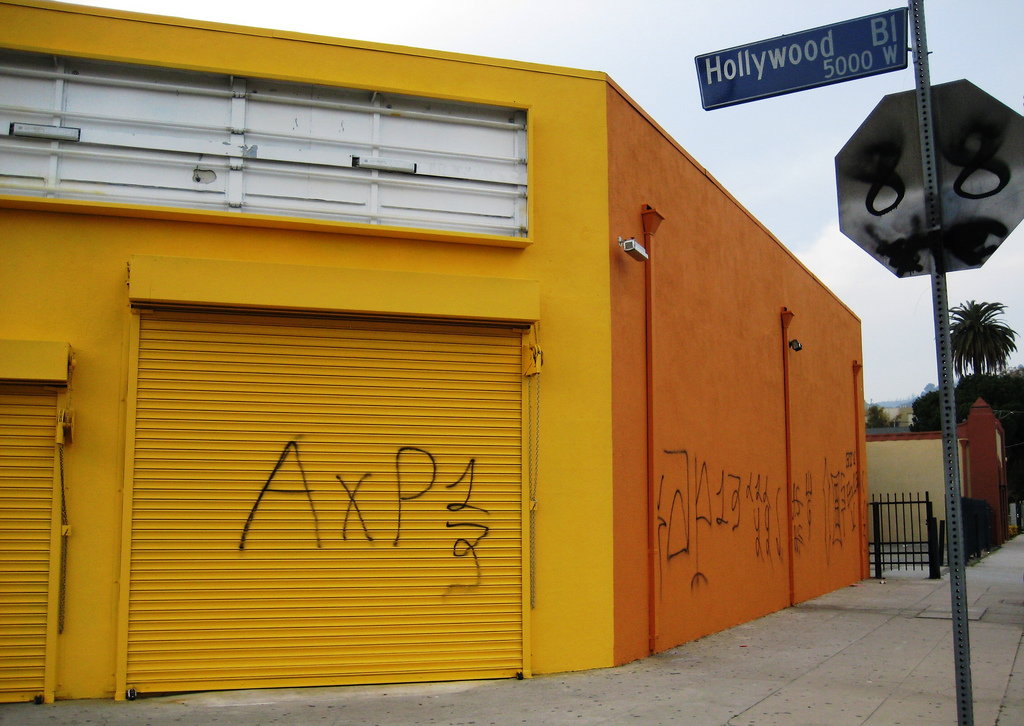
Armenian Power graffiti in Little Armenia, Los Angeles

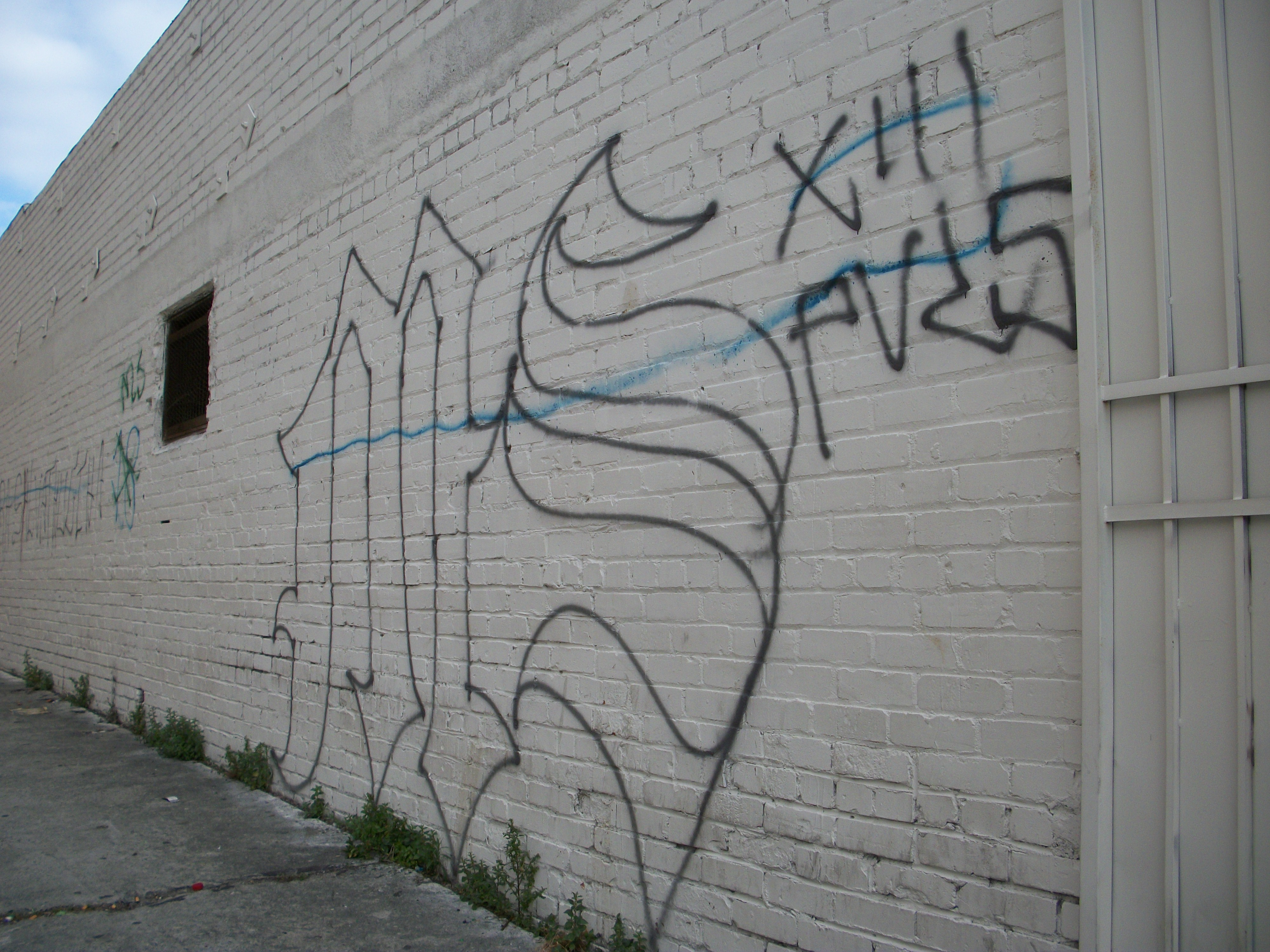
MS-13 graffiti

This is a list of notable criminal gangs in Los Angeles, California.

The County and the City of Los Angeles has been nicknamed the "Gang Capital of America," with an estimated 450 active gangs with a combined membership of more than 45,000.

== Gangs ==
- Armenian mafia
  - Armenian Power
- Asian Boyz
- Bahala Na Gang
- Biker gangs
  - Chosen Few
  - Diablos
  - Devils Disciples
  - Hells Angels
  - Hessians
  - Mongols
  - Vagos
  - Galloping Goose
- Black Vanguard
- Bloods
  - Black P. Stones
  - Bounty Hunter Watts Bloods
  - Crenshaw Mafia Gangster Bloods
- Crips
  - Sons of Samoa
  - Tongan Crip Gang
  - Grape Street Watts Crips
  - Kelly Park Compton Crips
  - Nutty Blocc Compton Crips
  - Rollin' 30s Harlem Crips
  - Rollin' 60s Neighborhood Crips
  - Rollin' 90s Neighborhood Crips
  - South Side Compton Crips
  - Venice Shoreline Crips
- Deputy gangs
  - Compton Executioners
  - Lynwood Vikings
- Hoover Criminals
- Jamaican posse
  - Shower Posse
- Juggalos
- Peckerwood
  - Aryan Brotherhood
  - Nazi Lowriders
  - Public Enemy No. 1
- Israeli mafia
  - Abergil Crime Family
- Italian-American Mafia
  - Los Angeles crime family
- Kkangpae
- Menace of Destruction
- Mexican Mafia
- Russian mafia
- Satanas
- Sinaloa Cartel
- Pirus
  - Cedar Block Piru
  - Elm Street Piru
  - Fruit Town Piru
  - Mob Piru
  - Tree Top Piru
- Sureños
  - 18th Street gang
  - 38th Street gang
  - Avenues
  - Azusa 13
  - Barriox13
  - Culver City Boys
  - El Monte Flores
  - Florencia 13
  - Logan Heights Gang
  - MS-13
  - Ontario Varrio Sur
  - Playboys
  - Puente 13
  - Santa Monica 13
  - Temple Street
  - Toonerville Rifa 13
  - Varrio Nuevo Estrada
  - Venice 13
  - Vineland Boys
  - Westside Locos
  - White Fence
  - Wilmas 13
  - Lopers 13
- Tiny Rascal Gang
- Triad
  - 14K
  - Bamboo Union
  - Big Circle Gang
  - Black Dragons
  - Four Seas Gang
  - Wah Ching
  - Wo Hop To
- Xã Hội Đen
- Yakuza

== See also ==
- List of gangs in the United States
- List of LASD deputy gangs
- Crips–Blood gang war
