= OVS =

OVS may refer to:

== Political entities ==
- Orange Free State, the historical precursor to the present-day Free State province (Afrikaans: Oranje-Vrijstaat)
  - Free State Province, a present-day province in South Africa that was called the Orange Free State in 1994-1995 (Afrikaans: Oranje-Vrijstaat)
- Organized Village of Saxman, a federally recognized Alaska Native tribe

== Schools ==
- Ojai Valley School, a boarding school in southern California, US
- Orchard View Schools, a school district in the U.S. state of Michigan

== Other ==
- Object–verb–subject, a rare permutation of word order in linguistic typology
- Ohio Valley Siouan languages, a subgroup of the Western Siouan languages
- Online Video Studio, an organization that works with different video platforms
- Open vSwitch, an open-source distributed virtual multilayer network switch
- OVS (gang), a Mexican-American (Chicano) family from Ontario, CA
- OVS (company), an Italian clothing company
