= Nuestra Familia =

Criminal organization of Mexican American prison gangs in the US

- Nuestra Familia symbol
- Founded: 1965; 61 years ago
- Founding location: Correctional Training Facility, Soledad, California
- Years active: 1965–present
- Territory: United States, Mexico, Canada
- Ethnicity: Mexican American, Mexican
- Membership (est.): approximately 250 members
- Activities: Drug trafficking, extortion, robbery, homicide
- Allies: Northern Structure; Mexican cartels Norteños, Black Guerrilla Family, Bloods, Crips, Latin Kings
- Rivals: Aryan Brotherhood; Fresno Bulldogs; Mexican Mafia; Mexikanemi; Sureños; Texas Syndicate

Nuestra Familia (Spanish for "our family") is a criminal organization of Mexican American (Chicano) prison gangs with origins in Northern California. While members of the Norteños gang are considered to be foot soldiers of Nuestra Familia, being a member of Nuestra Familia itself does not signify association as a Norteño. Some law enforcement agents speculate that the Nuestra Familia gang, which operates in and out of prisons, influences much of the criminal activity of thousands of Norteño gang members in California. The gang's main sources of income are distributing cocaine, heroin, marijuana, and methamphetamine within prison systems as well as in the community and extorting drug distributors on the streets.

== History ==
=== Origins ===
Nuestra Familia was organized at Correctional Training Facility in Soledad, California in 1965. In the late 1960s, Mexican-American inmates of the California state prison system began to separate into two rival groups, Nuestra Familia and the 1957-formed Mexican Mafia, according to the locations of their hometowns (the north-south dividing line is Bakersfield, California). The inmates who formed the Nuestra Familia gang banded together to protect themselves from the Mexican Mafia but then grew to be involved in drug dealing, extortion and robbery.

Nuestra Familia are prison enemies of the Southern Chicanos who consisted of La eMe, better known as the Mexican Mafia. While the Mexican Mafia had initially been created to protect Mexicans in prison, there was a perceived level of abuse by members of La eMe towards the imprisoned chicanos from rural farming areas of Northern California. The spark that led to the ongoing war between Nuestra Familia and members of the Mexican Mafia involved a situation in 1965 in which a member of La eMe stole a pair of shoes from a Northerner at Deuel Vocational Institute in Tracy. This event put into motion the longest-running gang war in the state of California.

The Nuestra Familia was not recognized as a prison gang by the California Department of Corrections and Rehabilitation until 1979.

=== Renewed organization ===
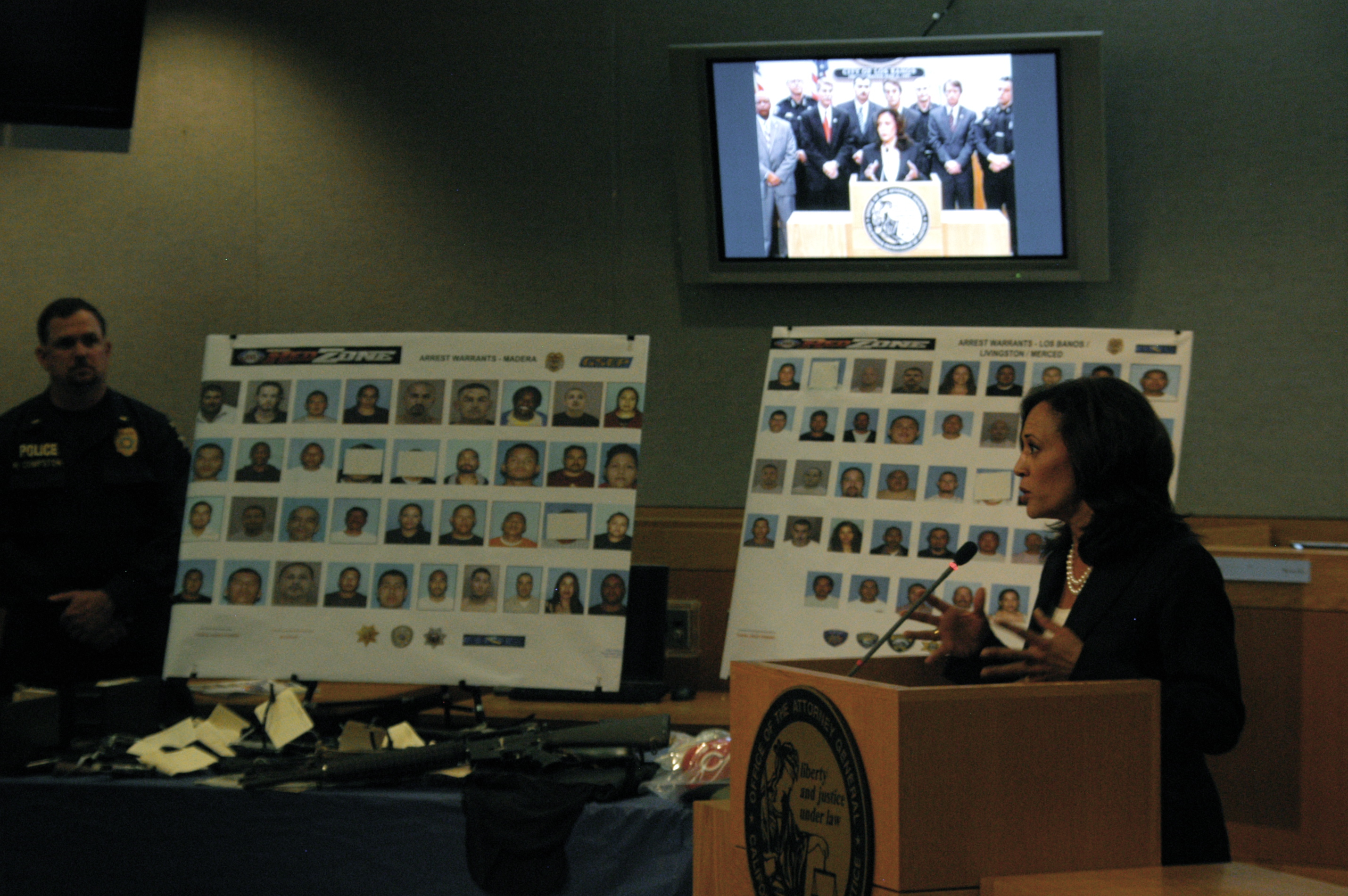
Then-Attorney General Kamala Harris announced the arrest of Nuestra Familia members on June 8, 2011

Since the written constitution of the Norteños stated that the gang's leaders resided in Pelican Bay State Prison in California; the relocation of the five leaders led to turmoil among its members. The leadership vacuum resulted in a power struggle between prospective generals.

Eventually, three new generals came to power at Pelican Bay, yet two were demoted, leaving only David "DC" Cervantes as the highest-ranking member of the gang in California. Cervantes' rise marked the first time in decades that the Norteños had a single leader at the helm of their criminal organization. The remaining leadership of the organization in Pelican Bay consists of Daniel "Stork" Perez, Anthony "Chuco" Guillen and George "Puppet" Franco. While all Nuestra Familia soldiers and captains in California are expected to follow the orders of Cervantes, a small percentage of the gang remains loyal to the former generals and captains imprisoned in Colorado. Former California Governor Arnold Schwarzenegger had complained that keeping the five remaining gang leaders located in the same prison only continued to add to California gang violence, and that they should be scattered throughout different prisons. While the recognized leaders of Nuestra Familia in Pelican Bay ask that members respect the former leaders, they have been effectively stripped of their authority.

== Membership ==
While Nuestra Familia is primarily a Chicano gang, membership sometimes extends to other Latinos as well as non-Latinos. Members of the organization are considered to have taken a "blood oath" to join the gang, and are considered lifelong participants. Nuestra Familia's written constitution allegedly states that no member should prioritize women, money or drugs over their membership in the gang. Membership in the gang extends beyond prison. Women are not allowed to become full-fledged members of Nuestra Familia, but are sometimes used for communication and drug-running purposes as they are considered less likely to be noticed by law enforcement agents. The NF has a formal written constitution and a membership of approximately 250, with an additional 1,000 associates.

== Symbols ==
Members of Nuestra Familia are known to wear red bandanas ("red rags") to identify themselves. Other symbols include use of the number 14 or XIV, as the letter "N" is the 14th letter of the English alphabet. Nuestra Familia members often use the image of a sombrero with a machete as their gang symbol.

== Investigations and prosecutions ==
=== Operation Black Widow ===
Federal law enforcement agencies, long unable to infiltrate Nuestra Familia, began to step up their investigations in the late 1990s. In 2000 and 2001, 22 members were indicted on Racketeer Influenced and Corrupt Organizations Act (RICO) charges, including several who were allegedly serving as high-ranking gang leaders while confined in Pelican Bay. Thirteen of the defendants pleaded guilty; the other cases are still ongoing. Two of the defendants face the death penalty for ordering murders related to the drug trade. The largest of the federal investigations was Operation Black Widow. At the time of Operation Black Widow, law enforcement officials had estimated that Nuestra Familia was responsible for at least 600 murders in the previous 30 years.

In the aftermath of Operation Black Widow, the five highest-ranking leaders of Nuestra Familia, James "Tibbs" Morado, Joseph "Pinky" Hernandez, Gerald "Cuete" Rubalcaba, Cornelio Tristan, and Tex Marin Hernandez, were transferred to the United States Penitentiary, ADX Florence, the federal supermax prison in Colorado.

=== Operation Knockout ===
In April 2010, federal and local law enforcement agencies concluded what was considered the most significant effort to dismantle the Central Coast leadership structure of Nuestra Familia. After months of investigation, at least 37 alleged gang members were arrested during the raids conducted. Law enforcement authorities seized 40 pounds of cocaine, 14 pounds of marijuana, and dozens of firearms.

=== 2013 indictments ===
On June 11, 2013, Santa Clara County district attorney Jeff Rosen announced the indictment of 48 Nuestra Familia associates on 77 felony charges ranging from drug dealing to murder.

== See also ==
- List of California street gangs
- Prison gangs in the United States
- MS-13
- List of criminal gangs in Los Angeles
- Aryan Brotherhood
