= Toonerville Rifa 13 =

Mexican-American street gang

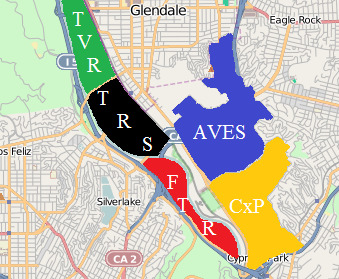
- Toonerville Rifa (TVR) depicted in green among other North-East Los Angeles gangs. the Avenues (AVES) is blue, Thee Rascals is black, Frogtown is red and Cypress Park in yellow.
- Founded: 1930s
- Founding location: Atwater Village, Los Angeles, California, U.S.
- Years active: 1930s–present
- Territory: Atwater Village, Glendale, Gwinnett County, Georgia Bremen, Georgia
- Ethnicity: Chicano
- Membership (est.): 450
- Activities: Murder, assault, drug trafficking, racketeering, witness intimidation, robbery, extortion, auto theft
- Allies: Mexican Mafia; Sureños
- Rivals: Armenian Power; The Avenues; Westside Locos The Rascals, Frogtown Rifa, Vineland Boys, MS-13, Russian mafia, Norte-14
- Notable members: Timothy Joseph McGhee

Toonerville Rifa 13, also known as The Ville, is a Mexican-American street gang located in Los Angeles county.

== History ==
The name Toonerville was created in 1902 by a cartooner in Louisville Kentucky; he merged his profession and the city he lived to create the Toonervile Folks cartoon and sold it to the newspapers. A group of friends in 1926 in Los Angeles started calling the area they lived Toonerville due to the red line trolley going through their small mixed race community and an area adjacent called Tropico and South Glendale. As they traveled to parties and got into fights they became a gang. In the late 1940s a group of them formed the cliques Callejeros the Aztecas until the late 1950's. By this time most were older, so a new clique surfaced called the Latin Souls, and a smaller one called the Cut Downs, but they did not take. In the early 1960s another clique was created called the Midgets. Late in the 1970s another one was created from the Glendale side called the Gangsters. Toonerville was divided in two sides north and south, by one of the members of the Midgets that lived in Glendale. In the early 1990s a Tujunga chapter of the gang was formed. All the cliques were and had been part of Toonerville and their creation was due to difference in age and different activities.

The gang’s leader, Timothy Joseph McGhee, was sentenced to death in 2009 for his role in three separate homicides. Additionally, he is suspected of taking part in as many as twelve murders in the Los Angeles area. TVR 13 claims Atwater Village as its turf.

== See also ==
- List of California street gangs
