= Tongan Crip Gang =

- The logo of the Texas Rangers Major League Baseball team is commonly used by members as a symbol for TCG. The logo of MLB's Minnesota Twins is also commonly used to represent TCG as well.
- Founding location: Inglewood, California, United States
- Years active: 1970s–present
- Territory: California, Utah
- Criminal activities: Drug trafficking, robbery, extortion, murder, burglary, identification theft, car theft
- Allies: Sons of Samoa, Tongan Foe Lyfe Ganster Crip, Raymond Avenue Crips
- Rivals: Kearns Town Bloods, Baby Regulators, Lennox 13 Park Village Compton Crips, Carver Park Crips

The Tongan Crip Gang (TCG) is a Tongan American street gang that is a subgroup, or "set", of the Crips gang alliance. The gang is active in the U.S. states of California, Utah and Alaska, Washington and parts of Auckland, New Zealand.

== Overview ==
=== History ===
The Tongan Crip Gang was founded in Inglewood, California, where the gang is aligned with numerous other, predominantly African American Crips sets. The Tongan Crip Gang then emerged in Salt Lake City after gang members from the Los Angeles area began moving to Utah in late 1988 in order to escape increasing law enforcement pressure on the gang in California.

Many of the Tongan Crip Gang members moved from California to the Salt Lake City, Utah area in the 1980s, and distributed the gang set there.

The Salt Lake City branch of the Tongan Crip Gang was founded in the mid-80s after intimidation by Latino gang members in the predominantly Latino neighborhood of Glendale.

== Criminal activities ==
The Tongan Crip Gang's crimes include burglaries, auto theft, selling drugs, home invasions, credit card fraud, bank fraud, federal fraud (theft of federal documents, passports, driver's licenses), witness intimidation, insurance fraud, arson, impersonation of both state police and federal agents, prostitution, hacking, kidnapping, extortion by means of threat to reveal information about the private life of an individual, crimes against the elderly, crimes against Central American Communities and individuals associated with the MS-13 (Mara Salvatrucha Gang), crimes against the disabled, mail fraud and murder.

In 2007, members of the Tongan Crip Gang and the 18 Street Gang were indicted by a federal grand jury for criminal conspiracy in a plot to murder 33 members of a Los Angeles subset of MS-13.

== See also ==
- Gangs in Los Angeles
