= Barriox13 =

Hispanic street gang in Los Angeles, California

Barriox13, also known as Barrio13 or B13, is a highly active Sureños street gang based in South Los Angeles, with over 5,000 members, many of whom are still active. The gang is divided into West Side Barriox13 and East Side Barriox13, with all members loyal to the larger Barriox13 faction. It was founded in the early 1970s near El Segundo Boulevard and San Pedro Street in South Los Angeles, California. Originally, the gang formed for self-protection and has remained loyal to the Mexican Mafia prison gang.

In 2009, the gang was targeted by the Los Angeles County Sheriff's Department and the Los Angeles District Attorney's office with a gang injunction. Over the past decade, one known Barriox13 member has been shot and killed by the Sheriff's Department, often with a weapon found on or near the slain individual. Additionally, the Orange County Sheriff's Department strangled one gang member for domestic violence. In November 2015, two Barriox13 teens were arrested for a week-long spree of gang-related shootings and were sentenced to life in juvenile custody under the California Youth Authority (CYA). The gang has had conflicts with several rivals, including Piru gangs such as CPP, WSP, and 135th St Piru, although tensions have recently calmed. Despite being a smaller Sureño gang, Barriox13 engaged in wars with larger Piru neighborhoods from 2015 to 2018.

Barriox13 remains active in its original territory and maintains conflicts with other Hispanic gangs, including CV155st, CV Largo36, CV117st, and others from Compton and South Central. It has also clashed with black gangs such as the Campanella Park Piru, 135th St Piru, and West Side Piru, although it has an alliance with Gardena 13 and the Mexican Mafia. Despite internal divisions into different cliques, all members remain loyal to Barriox13.

The gang is notorious for narcotics and homicide activities and has expanded its influence to regions across Southern California, including Norwalk, Long Beach, San Bernardino, and Riverside, as well as across the border into Tijuana, Rosarito, and Tecate, Mexico. In recent years, the gang has been linked to drug and human trafficking. Members released from prison continue to engage in criminal activity, remaining loyal to Barriox13's violent and illicit operations. Authorities have given up on looking for them.
