= Varrio Nuevo Estrada =

Mexican-American street gang

Varrio Nuevo Estrada 13
- Founded: 1940s
- Founding location: Boyle Heights, Los Angeles, California, United States
- Years active: 1940s–present
- Territory: East Los Angeles
- Ethnicity: Chicano (Mexican American)
- Activities: Murder, drug trafficking, racketeering, extortion, assaults, drive-by shootings and illegal gambling
- Allies: Mexican Mafia; Sureños
- Rivals: White Fence

Varrio Nuevo Estrada, also known as VNE13, is a Chicano criminal street gang founded in Boyle Heights, California, in the Estrada Courts housing projects. VNE is one of 34 gangs in a 15-square-mile area east of downtown Los Angeles.

== History ==
Varrio Nuevo Estrada formed in the housing project community of Estrada Courts in Boyle Heights after the government relocated many poor families into the area in the early 1940s. Today VNE is still one of the most prominent Hispanic gangs in eastside of Los Angeles.

== Location ==
Varrio Nuevo Estrada has expanded to other local communities such as East Los Angeles, Montebello, and Lancaster. VNE cliques include the Tiny Winos, Tiny Locos, Devils, Ninos, Chicos, Cutdowns, Dukes, Tiny Dukes, Tiny Gangsters, Termites, Santos, Spantos, and Malos in Estrada Courts, Tick Tocks, and Tiny Locos in Montebello, Primos in Lancaster and Rosamond and Southill which sits in parts of Montebello, Bell Gardens and Downey. They are primarily a Los Angeles County gang and there is no validated evidence of subgroups outside of Southern California.

== Culture ==
Varrio Nuevo Estrada places great admiration on those that have died in the Varrio. One well known example of this is the mural in memory of one such VNE member located at 3328 Hunter Street in Boyle Heights. The artist, Daniel Martinez, painted the mural in 1973. Like many other gangs they place a great deal of importance on respect, loyalty and trustworthiness. They have old ties to the Mexican Mafia and unite under the Sureño banner in the California Prison System despite rivalries.

== Criminal activity ==
Varrio Nuevo Estrada is so notorious that the Los Angeles City Attorney petitioned the court for a permanent gang injunction against them on November 15, 2004. Even with the gang injunction, VNE continues to exert influence in their respective territories. They are still involved in a variety of criminal activities from murder, arms trafficking, drug sales to drive-by shootings, assaults and various other petty crimes. Like most other street gangs, Varrio Nuevo Estrada gets the majority of its income from street level narcotics distribution.

== See also ==
- Sureños
- Mexican Mafia
