= Forming Kaos =

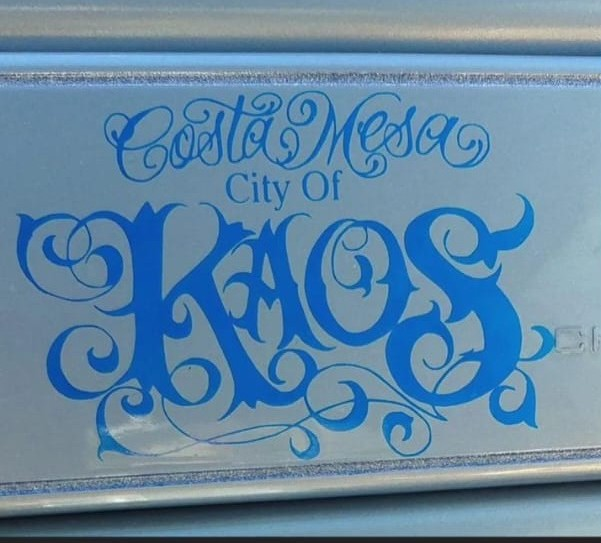
- Traditional Chicano lowrider calligraphy on a custom car panel reading “Costa Mesa City of Kaos,” reflecting FK's signature expression and regional pride.
- Founded: Early 1990's
- Founding location: Costa Mesa, California, U.S.
- Years active: 1990s–present
- Territory: Costa Mesa
- Ethnicity: Mexican American (primarily)
- Activities: Drug trafficking, extortion, firearms trafficking, violent crime (assault, homicide), racketeering
- Allies: Mexican Mafia, Sureños
- Rivals: Other Costa Mesa gangs

Forming Kaos (FK) is a criminal street gang based in Costa Mesa, a city located in Orange County, California. The gang is known by several aliases, including Forming Kaos 13, Varrio Forming Kaos x3, Forming Kaos Rifa, 4MK, Kaos Gang, and Formando Desmadre. The name Kaos is a stylized spelling of the word "chaos", and is pronounced accordingly, reflecting the group's intended meaning behind the name. Composed primarily of Mexican-American members, FK is affiliated with the Sureños and has documented ties to the Mexican Mafia (La Eme).

== History and origins ==
Forming Kaos originated on the west side of Costa Mesa during the early 1990s, not as a gang but as a non-traditional party/tagger crew. By the mid-1990s, the group had expanded beyond its original base with the formation of an East Side FK chapter in Costa Mesa's east side. Although East Side FK was significantly smaller than its West Side counterpart, it functioned as a distinct street gang, whereas West Side FK retained its roots as a party/tagger crew.

Between 1999 and 2000, the larger West Side group forcibly absorbed East Side FK, consolidating power and formally establishing the West Side Forming Kaos Gang. This unification was driven by overlapping social circles, a desire for a single, stronger identity, and growing tensions with other local Costa Mesa gangs. Following the merger, the group's shift toward a gang identity was immediate, marking the end of its original cultural roots.

Law enforcement records indicate that Forming Kaos's west side Costa Mesa territory is geographically bounded by Fairview Road and Placentia Avenue, and by 19th Street and West Wilson Street. Academic research on Southern California gang structures further notes that FK has been documented as extorting drug dealers within its territory, forwarding a portion of these proceeds to imprisoned members of the Mexican Mafia.

From its inception, FK has organized itself through sub-groups (cliques). One of the earliest and most recognizable of these was 4MK, an acronym for "Forming Kaos" (with "4" representing "for," "M" for "ming," and "K" for "Kaos"). Created during the group's pre-gang phase, 4MK was active only before FK evolved into a street gang, yet played a key role in establishing its identity and shaping its early culture. Additional cliques include East Side Forming Kaos (now inactive), Los Originales (comprising founding members), Devil's Click, and Los Desmadrosos.

== Symbology and identification ==
As FK's internal identity and structure evolved in the 2000s and 2010s, its visual identifiers expanded beyond graffiti to include gang symbols, tattoos, and numeric codes, which served as key markers of membership and allegiance. The numeric code "357" corresponds to the letters F, K, and R on a telephone keypad, denoting "Forming Kaos Rifa." During this period, members commonly referred to themselves as "Ks," while newer members adopted the label "Fs," reflecting the separation between long-standing members and recent recruits. Tattoos frequently feature a maple leaf, referencing Maple Avenue in Costa Mesa, widely considered the gang's place of origin, as well as clique-specific names.

== Overview of criminal activity ==
The Federal Bureau of Investigation, as part of a multi-agency task force, has identified Forming Kaos as a criminal enterprise in Costa Mesa, with documented involvement in narcotics trafficking, extortion, violent crime, and firearms offenses.

In the fall of 2008, multiple agencies launched Operation Black Flag, a three-and-a-half-year investigation, which began in Costa Mesa, targeting the Mexican Mafia and Forming Kaos. Agencies involved in the operation included the Santa Ana Gang Task Force, the United States Attorney for the Central District of California, the Federal Bureau of Investigation (FBI), the Bureau of Alcohol, Tobacco, Firearms and Explosives (ATF), the California Department of Corrections and Rehabilitation, the Orange County District attorney, the Costa Mesa Police Department, and the Orange County Sheriff's Department. According to the federal indictment, FK functioned as a subordinate criminal organization to the Mexican Mafia's operations in Orange County.

The investigation resulted in the arrest of 99 alleged members and associates of Mexican Mafia-affiliated gangs, with a focus on FK's narcotics and firearms trafficking operations. Five federal indictments were unsealed, among which two major Racketeer Influenced and Corrupt Organizations Act (RICO) cases: one charging 28 individuals connected to the Orange County wing of the Mexican Mafia, and another targeting 17 FK members, 11 of whom faced federal racketeering charges. This operation exposed details of FK’s hierarchical structure, territorial control, and criminal enterprises, leading to the conviction of multiple members in federal court.

Forming Kaos maintains its influence in Costa Mesa's West Side through a sustained pattern of intimidation, violent assaults, and homicides against rival gangs. Among its activities, the gang aims to generate income by imposing so-called "taxes" on local drug dealers and from providing protection for ongoing drug operations. Members have been documented serving as armed security during drug transactions and engaging independently in the distribution of firearms, methamphetamine, cocaine, and heroin. The gang’s members routinely circulate weapons among themselves to enforce discipline and to facilitate retaliatory acts of violence. Numerous individuals associated with the gang have been charged and convicted of conspiracy, assault with dangerous weapons, and extortion.
