= Avenues (gang) =

Mexican-American street gang

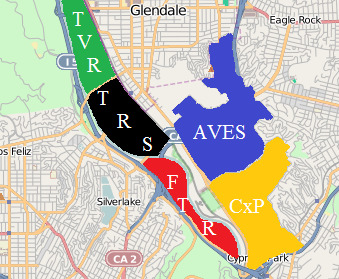
- Avenues (AVES) depicted in blue among other North-East Los Angeles gangs. Toonerville is green, Thee Rascals is black, Frogtown is red and Cypress Park in yellow.
- Founded: 1920s
- Founding location: Los Angeles, California, United States
- Years active: 1920s–present
- Territory: Mainly in Los Angeles (Highland Park, Cypress Park, Glassell Park, and Eagle Rock)
- Ethnicity: Mexican American/Native American
- Membership (est.): approximately 800
- Activities: Murder, assault, arms trafficking, drug trafficking, extortion, hate crimes, kidnapping, racketeering, motor vehicle theft, robbery, burglary, vandalism, witness intimidation and human trafficking
- Allies: Mexican Mafia; Sureños
- Rivals: 18th Street gang Satanas

The Avenues, also known as Avenidas or AVE's, is a Mexican/Mexican American criminal street gang mostly in Los Angeles County, California. They originally started as a social club for local Latino youths to protect themselves from other violent youths. The Avenues, like most Mexican gangs in Los Angeles, are under the direct control of the Mexican Mafia when sent to State, County, or Federal prisons.

== History ==
The Avenues were not always violent when they started and rarely engaged in illegal activities. They were started by the Flores brothers in the 1940s, but little is known about the brothers. The greatest of their crimes during the 1940s were simple assaults. As time progressed and their numbers increased, they became more violent and started to act more like a criminal street gang and less like a social club. In the late 1960s, when heroin started to flood the streets, they turned for the worse and would be forevermore labeled a criminal street gang. They increasingly took part in the illegal drug trade and these actions have continued to the present day. By the time the 1970s rolled around the Avenues had grown from a neighborhood social club into a highly organized gang whose territory stretched 6 miles. The Avenues also began to clash with neighboring gangs, such as Highland Park 13, Cypress Park Boys, Toonerville, Frog Town Rifa and Thee Rascals, in an attempt to assert their dominance. At first, it was common for rival gang members to fight one another to settle scores, but once cocaine hit the streets, gangs noticed that huge amounts of money can be generated from its distribution and shootings/stabbings became more prevalent. In the 1990s the main drug of choice in the Avenue's hood switched from cocaine to methamphetamine due to the establishment of industrial-sized meth laboratories in central-Mexico as well as the increased scarcity of cocaine after the fall of the Medellin cartel. During this period of time drug-addiction and violent crime became an everyday fact of life in northeast Los Angeles as rival gangs began fighting over drug turf. In the last half of the 1990s northeast Los Angeles had more homicides than any other part of the city with 500 gang-related shootings. The Avenues Gang are well known for their hatred of and hate crimes committed against African-American residents of their neighborhoods. Reflecting their hate-filled attitudes, they tried to keep even non-gang affiliated African-Americans from moving into the Highland Park area.

== Location ==
The Avenues are located in Cypress Park, Glassell Park, Highland Park and Eagle Rock. Each of the Avenues cliques claims a gang territory based on where gang members live. The main cliques are 43rd Aves, Avenues 57, Cypress Avenues, Division street and Drew Street, all centered on the streets for which they are named. Their barrio once covered almost 6 square miles. Members of the 43rd Aves were prosecuted by the U.S. Attorney's Office in 2006 for hate-crime charges for harassing, attacking and murdering African Americans in Highland Park. Many gang members have relocated to San Bernardino and Riverside counties – and other areas of Los Angeles County – due to the gang injunctions from the LAPD and on going gang wars with Cypress Park boys and Highland Park 13. Increased housing and rental prices in many east side neighborhoods have meant that former gang members have moved as rentals and home prices became too expensive. Even through all of this, the Avenues gang that rule Drew Street have survived countless convictions, injunctions, evictions and deportations. Police have desperately tried to break the gang for decades. Major successes came with raids and later the demolition of an Avenues bastion on Drew Street in Glassell Park.

== Culture ==
The Avenues have a long history of involvement with the Mexican Mafia. Gang members are secretive and their code of silence is taken seriously and violations have lethal consequences. Respect and loyalty are considered to be very important. They challenge anyone and enforce the borders of their territory with deadly accuracy. Avenues gang members tattoos are known by a skull with a fedora and a bullet hole in the skull, or the letters LA, AVES, A's and Avenidas. The Avenues are one of LA's most violent gangs. President Bill Clinton spoke out against them in 1995.

== Criminal activity ==
The Avenues gained national attention in 1995, when several members opened fire on a car that made a wrong turn into a Cypress Park alley, killing 3-year-old Stephanie Kuhen. Gang members were also accused of the August 2008 killing of Los Angeles County Deputy Sheriff Abel Escalante, 27, who worked at the Men's Central Jail guarding some of the county's most dangerous inmates. Escalante was gunned down outside his parents' Cypress Park home as he prepared to go to work. The Southern Poverty Law Center’s Intelligence Report described the gang’s attacks on black residents as part of a Mexican Mafia–directed campaign of “ethnic cleansing,” a characterization some community leaders and journalists criticized as exaggerated. . Aside from their participation in hate related crimes, their main source of income is from illegal narcotics and human trafficking. The Avenues, as with most other Sureño sets, are well connected with Mexican drug cartels, specifically the Sinaloa cartel. Methamphetamine, cocaine, black-tar heroin, and marijuana is sold by street dealers who operate out of numerous hidden "trap-houses" where the product is stored and processed into smaller quantities. The Avenues also sell an arsenal of illegal/stolen firearms, ranging from handguns to assault rifles, as well as knives, clubs, etc. They are responsible for over 100 murders in the last 20 years alone, specifically rival gang members.

== See also ==
- Gangs in Los Angeles
- Surenos
