= Puente 13 =

Street gang in La Puente, California

- Founded: 1953; 73 years ago
- Founding location: La Puente, California, United States
- Years active: ever since 1953
- Territory: San Gabriel Valley
- Ethnicity: Mexican American
- Membership (est.): 100 - 1000(including affiliates)
- Activities: Drug trafficking, fraud, murder, assault
- Allies: Mexican Mafia; Sureños
- Rivals: Azusa 13, Townsmen 13

Puente 13 (P13) is a street gang in La Puente They are Sureños. They are described as Mafia related or Mexican mafia related. They were formed c. 1953 as the Bridgetown Gentlemen (puente is Spanish "bridge"), or "Old Town Puente". Then they dropped the "Old Town", later adding the "-13" that signifies allegiance to the Mexican Mafia. The gang is known for its violent criminal activities, drug smuggling and illicit contributions to the Mexican Mafia.

== Territory ==
Puente 13 claims the entire city and is one of the many gangs in the San Gabriel Valley.

== Notable events ==
2013: Two carnals (leaders) of the gang taken down.

2018: 17 people were indicted on identity theft charges and charges relating to supplying methamphetamine, including to the Pitchess Detention Center in Castaic, after an investigation into the gang led by the DEA and the USSS.
