= Black P. Stones (Jungles) =

African-American street gang

Westside Black P. Stone Bloods
- Years active: 1960s-present
- Territory: Baldwin Village
- Ethnicity: Predominantly African American
- Membership (est.): 500–900
- Activities: Drug trafficking, weapons trafficking, robbery, assault, murder

The Jungles faction of the Black P. Stones street gang is a "set" of the Bloods gang alliance in Los Angeles. Originating in Los Angeles' Baldwin Village neighborhood in the 1960s, the Black P. Stones became one of the largest gangs in the city. The gang has been linked to various crimes, including murders, assaults, robberies, narcotics violations and firearms violations, and has been the subject of numerous FBI and LAPD investigations.

== Overview ==
=== Territory ===
The Black P. Stones in Los Angeles once consisted of two separate gangs; City Stone Bloods, in the Mid-City/Arlington Heights area, and the Jungle Stone Bloods, in the area that was once known as "the Jungles" during the 1960s-1980s. To the early 2000s, now officially known as Baldwin Village, on the West Side of South Central Los Angeles. Currently, the Black P Stones have a loose alliance with the Playboy Gangster Crips in nearby La Cienega Heights. Although Baldwin Village is less than a mile square, the area is home to 700 to 800 gang members, according to the Los Angeles Police Department (LAPD) in 2005.

=== Intergang relations ===
The Black P. Stones are affiliated with the Bloods alliance and especially with the Piru coalition. The gang is a rival of the Crips. The Black P. Stones have also been involved in a long-running conflict with the 18th Street gang, a Latino gang which is based in a territory north of Baldwin Village.

== Investigations and prosecutions ==
On November 10, 2005, the Federal Bureau of Investigation (FBI) Los Angeles Office and Los Angeles Police Department (LAPD) served 16 federal drug indictments and arrested at least 18 members of the Black P. Stones accused of conspiracy and drug trafficking in a joint effort called "Operation Stone Cold". Almost 1,000 law enforcement personnel took part in the operation, carrying out police raids in Baldwin Village, Hawthorne and Inglewood, and seizing stashes of crack cocaine and weapons, including an AR-15 assault rifle and an AK-47. The indictments followed an investigation which lasted over a year, and involved informants infiltrating the gang and making videotaped drug buys from members. 17 people were convicted on federal charges, and another 12 were convicted on state charges following the investigation.

In 2006, a gang injunction was filed against the Black P. Stones by the Los Angeles City Attorney, Rocky Delgadillo, prohibiting members from congregating in public. Police alleged the gang was responsible for 1,500 aggravated assaults and 28 murders between 2000 and 2005.

75 members and associates of the gang were indicted on a variety of state and federal drug charges as a result of "Operation Red Dawn", a year-long investigation by the FBI and LAPD, which culminated in a series of raids involving over 900 federal agents and police officers in Southwest Los Angeles, on May 19, 2011. 135.5 grams of PCP; 41.2 grams of methamphetamine; 25 kilograms of marijuana; 1.7 kilograms of cocaine; and a variety of firearms were seized as a result of the operation.

Los Angeles City Attorney Mike Feuer and prosecutors heavily targeted property owners and managers of the Chesapeake Apartments, a 425-unit apartment complex spread over more than 17 acres which was a longtime stronghold for the Black P. Stones, to crackdown on gang crime. Between July 2013 and November 2017, Feuer filed 98 nuisance abatement lawsuits and secured 96 injunctions related to specific properties with documented gang and/or narcotics activity. The LAPD also conducted raids and arrests among the apartment buildings which decreased crime within that area dramatically.

== In the media ==
The 2001 film Training Day, starring Denzel Washington, was filmed on a cul-de-sac in Baldwin Village, and featured Cle Shaheed Sloan of Athens Park. Additionally, the gang was featured in another film that year, Baby Boy. The Jungles appear in season 2, episode 1 of the television series Southland and season 1, episode 12 of Gang Related, as well as the music video for the Waka Flocka Flame song "Hard in da Paint".

== See also ==
- African-American organized crime
- Gangs in Los Angeles
- People Nation
