= Timothy Joseph McGhee =

American mass murderer on death row

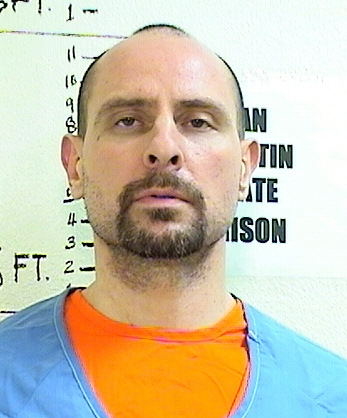
- Born: April 27, 1973 (age 53); Los Angeles, California, U.S.
- Other names: Huero; Eskimo; The Monster of Atwater; Joe McGhee
- Convictions: Murder, attempted murder, assault, conspiracy to commit an assault, conspiracy to commit vandalism, resisting executive officers in the performance of their duties (overturned)
- Penalty: Death + 75 years to life (overturned)

Details
- Victims: 12 confirmed homicides 10 confirmed attempted homicides 3 convictions for homicide
- Country: United States
- State: California
- Date apprehended: February 11, 2003
- Imprisoned at: Kern Valley State Prison

Timothy Joseph McGhee (born April 27, 1973) is an American convicted serial killer and Toonerville Rifa 13 gang leader from the Atwater Village neighborhood of Los Angeles, California. He is alleged to be responsible for at least 12 homicides between 1997 and 2001, three of which led to convictions. McGhee is also suspected of at least ten attempted murders, four of which led to convictions. In 2018, the Los Angeles Times named McGhee one of the top 20 most notorious killers in the history of California, a list that included the likes of Charles Manson, the Golden State Killer, and the Night Stalker.

After his arrest for assaulting a law enforcement officer, McGhee spent 1994 to 2000 either incarcerated or on parole. During his stints as a parolee, he allegedly shot seven people, killing three, and attempted to murder two LAPD officers. He was arrested in 2003 on homicide charges and sentenced to death in 2009. In a separate trial in 2007, McGhee was sentenced to 75 years to life for leading a 2005 prison riot. California Governor Gavin Newsom placed a moratorium on executions in the state of California in 2019, so McGhee was transferred from San Quentin's death row to the general population in Salinas Valley State Prison. McGhee is now serving life in prison without the possibility of parole, but current California law allows for his execution if the moratorium is ever lifted. In 2025, McGhee's murder convictions and death penalty sentences were overturned by the California Supreme Court on grounds that a juror was improperly dismissed during deliberations.

== Personal life ==
McGhee was raised in the neighborhood of Atwater Village, a lower middle class area of Los Angeles just north of downtown Los Angeles along Interstate 5 adjacent to Glendale, California. His father was a White American of Scottish ancestry, while his mother was Mexican American.

== McGhee's early criminal history ==
McGhee's earliest recorded act of violence was a 1989 assault with a firearm when, at the age of 16, he pointed a shotgun at a guard while detained at a juvenile custody facility. In 1994, a 21-year-old McGhee was convicted of assaulting a law enforcement officer in San Bernardino County and was sentenced to four years in prison. He was released in 1997 after serving three years.

In 1997, two members of The Rascals, Juan Cardiel and Pedro Sanchez, were allegedly chased through the streets of Atwater Village by McGhee. Cardiel was shot in the back and paralyzed from the waist down. Sanchez took cover at a gas station, standing behind glass he thought was bulletproof. The shooter repeatedly fired through the glass door hitting Sanchez in the back. He would later recover from his injuries. Both identified McGhee as the shooter.

== Murder of Ronnie Martin ==
On October 14, 1997, while on parole, it was alleged that a 24-year-old McGhee committed his first homicide. Ronnie Martin (23) was a member of Frog Town, one of TVR's biggest rivals in Atwater Village. Martin was shot 28 times and pronounced dead at the scene. McGhee was not linked to this homicide until years later. After an unrelated charge violated his parole, McGhee was sent back to prison in late 1997.

== Parole Violations ==
McGhee was imprisoned for approximately a year and a half for a 1997 parole violation. He was released in 1999, then moving in with his grandmother in the San Gabriel Valley. In February 2000, McGhee was found further violating the terms of his parole and was returned sentenced to prison. He was released again in April 2000, after serving five years on an assault charge that initially carried a four-year sentence.

== Recording studio murder ==
On October 17, 1999, while McGhee was on parole, a bodyguard and two rap artists were shot near the gates of Echo Sounds music studio in Atwater Village after concluding a recording session. The crew had gathered on the studio's patio at 11:40 PM when at least two gunmen confronted them and began shooting without warning. Bodyguard Dwayne "Draws" Dupree (23) was killed, pronounced dead at the scene by paramedics. Dupree was guarding rapper Ricardo "Kurupt" Brown, the future executive vice president of Death Row Records, who was finishing his album Tha Streetz Iz a Mutha with Antra Records.

Kurupt's producer, Delmar "Daz Dillinger" Arnaud, also with Death Row Records and cousin of legendary rapper Calvin "Snoop Dogg" Broadus was present but uninjured. Death Row artist Jevon "Tha Realest" Jones was wounded in the foot, and Willard "Act Da Fool" Givers was wounded in the calf. It was initially suggested that a hidden track on the album that insulted rappers DMX (rapper), The Firm (hip hop group) and others could be a motive for the shooting. Later, McGhee and an affiliate were linked to the shooting.

== Murder of Ryan Gonzalez ==
On June 3, 2000, rival gang member Ryan Gonzalez (16) was killed as he walked home from a party. He was fatally shot in the 3300 block of Silver Lake Boulevard in Toonerville gang territory near Atwater Avenue Elementary School. A 27-year-old McGhee was the alleged assailant. Gonzalez was a member of The Rascals gang, sharing McGhee's nickname Huero. Investigators believe McGhee's motive was simply that the neighborhood wasn't big enough for two people with the same street name. In June 2000, an arrest warrant was issued for McGhee in connection with the Gonzalez murder, but it was several years until law enforcement caught up with him.

== Ambush of LAPD officers ==
On July 4, 2000, LAPD officers Thomas Baker and Carlos Langarica were on patrol when they received a call around 3:30 AM that three males had stolen a wallet and fled the scene of the robbery in a gray Honda. Upon encountering the vehicle traveling in the opposite direction, the officers made a U-turn and attempted to stop the vehicle. The driver refused to stop and accelerated, both officers noting they were headed into the heart of Toonerville gang territory in Atwater Village. Baker and Langarica later stated that the area was known as an "ambush area", where gang members would block streets with debris and open fire on police vehicles that drove through.

During this pursuit, a 27-year-old McGhee was allegedly using a police radio scanner to track the progress of the chase while coordinating an ambush. The officers reported dodging multiple pieces of debris, including a washing machine blocking the road and a bicycle being pushed into their path by persons unknown. After the officers made a right turn at the corner of Bemis Street and Brunswick Avenue, two gang members opened fire on the officers striking the driver's side door. The gray vehicle was eventually disabled by the officers ramming the rear, at which time the front seat passenger fled on foot while pointing a semi-automatic pistol at officers. When Officer Baker rammed the vehicle again, the remaining two passengers opened fire and both parties exchanged gunfire. All three suspects were apprehended by backup LAPD officers and charged with attempted murder. Mario "Little Boy" Aleman, Ramon "Chubbs" Maldonado, and Joseph "Little Respect" Aghazadeh were sentenced to two consecutive life terms. The two gang members who fired on police during the attempted ambush were never identified, although one of whom was suspected to be McGhee. Neither officer sustained injury, and both officers were awarded the LAPD Medal of Valor in 2003 for their bravery.

== Murders of Marty Gregory Roybal and David Lamont Martin ==
On September 14, 2000, John Marshall High School student Marty Gregory Roybal (17) was fatally shot while spray painting in Toonerville territory near the Red Car River Park in Atwater Village. A family member and responding officers mentioned that Roybal enjoyed "tagging" or spray painting. David Lamont Martin (33), who was homeless and likely a witness to the shooting, was also shot and killed at the scene. Twenty-seven-year-old McGhee was suspected in both shootings.

== Murder of Manuel Apodaca ==
McGhee had been incarcerated for yet another parole violation involving narcotics, this time at the California Institution for Men in Chino, California, but was released in May 2001. Beginning in June, he was suspected of shooting nine individuals in five months leaving six dead and three wounded. The homicidal spree began on June 11, 2001, when McGhee was allegedly traveling through the affluent Los Feliz area that borders Atwater Village and features the popular Griffith Observatory. Manuel Apodaca Jr. (21) lived 35 miles east in Pomona and was passing through with his pregnant girlfriend, Nina Guerrero. McGhee allegedly opened fire on their vehicle on Los Feliz Boulevard near Interstate 5 known in that area as the Golden State Freeway. Apodaca, allegedly a member of The Rascals (gang), was killed, and Guerrero suffered severe brain damage, but their unborn baby was delivered successfully.

== Murder of Carlos Velasco ==
In July 2001, Carlos Velasco (21) was working at a furniture warehouse on North San Fernando Road in Atwater Village. Police state that McGhee, who had driven by and seen the stranger, ordered gang affiliates to kill the man because he did not recognize him. The homicidal order was carried out successfully.

== Wisotsky massacre ==
Atwater Village resident Cheri Wisotsky (46) reported to police that McGhee allegedly was dealing drugs out of his sister's house nearby. On August 8, 2001, Wisotsky was murdered, along with two other witnesses to the crime: Cheri's mother, Mary Ann Wisotsky (64) and friend and neighbor Bryham Robinson (38). McGhee is the alleged triggerman in the triple homicide.

== Murder of Marjorie Mendoza ==
On November 8, 2001, McGhee was allegedly prowling the streets with fellow gang member Eduardo "Limpy" Rodriguez seeking revenge over the death of a comrade hours earlier. Armed with handguns and rifles, they came upon rival gang member Duane Natividad in the 3100 block of Hollydale Drive, six blocks south of the Gonzalez murder in 2000. Natividad was driving his Mitsubishi Montero with his girlfriend Marjorie Mendoza (25) and her friend Erica Rhee (16). Mendoza and Natividad had three children, Mark (5), Justin (3), and Nathan (1), who were not with them at the time. At 12:01 AM, November 9, as Natividad pulled up to a residence, McGhee and Rodriguez allegedly pulled in front of them, exited their vehicle, and opened fire on the Montero without warning or any verbal altercation. Natividad ducked and was struck in the right hand while Rhee ducked in the back seat, avoiding injury. As her boyfriend threw the car in reverse and accelerated away, Mendoza was hit multiple times and was driven to Glendale Memorial Hospital, where she later died.

Toonerville gang member Eduardo "Limpy" Rodriguez (22) was arrested the following day. Homicide detectives announced on November 27, 2001, that another suspect, Timothy McGhee, was still at large, and a warrant had been issued for his arrest. Detective Timothy Neel noted that since McGhee's release from prison six months before, "violent crimes in the Atwater area have skyrocketed."

== Murder of Christina Duran ==
Christina Duran (29), a friend of McGhee's, learned of Marjorie Mendoza's murder after McGhee solicited her help that same day. He needed to retrieve his girlfriend's cellphone, which he had dropped at the scene of the Mendoza murder. Duran was unsuccessful in finding the cellphone, but police managed to locate it and used it as evidence in McGhee's eventual trial. Shortly after the murder, Duran admitted to police during a videotaped interview with LAPD homicide detectives that McGhee was involved in the death of Mendoza. She was visibly shaken during the interrogation, frequently stating her fear of retribution. Two days after speaking with police, Christina Duran was killed in an execution-style murder on the night she celebrated her 29th birthday party, allegedly shot by McGhee five times in the right side of the head.

McGhee wrote hip hop lyrics as a hobby but never seriously pursued music. Many of his lyrics referred to his love of killing and his hatred of the police. His writings detailed the Mendoza murder as well as other previous homicides. One line eventually used against him in court read, "Witness protection won’t work/ Realize your rat ain’t going to make it to the stand," referring to his goal to eliminate anyone who might testify against him. He took the time to write, "everything in this book is a work of fiction," inside his spiral notebook in case police ever seized it. This did not deter the prosecution in his eventual trial.

== America's Most Wanted ==
In the fall of 2002, a task force of as many as 60 local and federal investigators began searching for McGhee after linking him to numerous homicides. LAPD detectives had enough evidence to charge him in a single case, the homicide of Margie Mendoza. On August 28, the LAPD appealed to the public for information regarding McGhee's involvement in the Mendoza murder and the triple homicide involving Cheri Wisotsky. A $55,000 reward was offered, but no one came forward.

When it became clear that McGhee was running the Toonerville gang from out of state, the U.S. Marshals Service aided the LAPD in forming a task force with more investigators, vehicles, and aircraft. McGhee was placed on the US Marshall's 15 Most Wanted Fugitives list on September 25, 2002, wanted for questioning in an additional 11 homicides. At this point, McGhee had been officially charged only with the Mendoza murder by the Los Angeles district attorney's office. In contrast, U.S. marshals had charged him with the federal offense of Unlawful Flight to Avoid Prosecution under warrant number W663293984. City councilman Eric Garcetti posted a $50,000 reward for McGhee's capture. Even the popular television series America's Most Wanted appealed to the public by filming a segment in early 2003 dedicated to the search for McGhee.

Despite such a record of violence, McGhee had received surprisingly little attention from the national media before this point, with barely any coverage in Southern California. In 2002, there were only 11 individuals alive in the United States who had committed more than 12 homicides. As Los Angeles Times reporter Jack Leonard put it many years later, "even in a city with more than 150 gang slayings a year, Timothy Joseph McGhee's murders stood out." The public hadn't heard much, but detectives knew McGhee's name well. Suspicious of the grand scope of McGhee's power and influence in the criminal world, they had difficulty linking him to his crimes because neighborhood residents, fellow gang members, and even rivals feared retaliation to the extent of refusing to talk to police.

On January 10, 2003, the Los Angeles Times reported that 29-year-old McGhee was wanted for his role in a dozen homicides; it was perhaps this newfound notoriety that drove McGhee to flee the state of California. He had already spent the last six months shifting between Atwater Village, Las Vegas, and Arizona, never staying in one place for more than a week. He would even throw off police by brazenly staying in rival gangs’ neighborhoods. LAPD officer Andy Teague was quoted as saying, "People know you don’t cross McGhee. If you cross him, you’re dead." A break in the case came when a reader of the Mojave Desert News recognized 29-year-old McGhee from a photo in the paper as a man who was living in Bullhead City, Arizona. McGhee's father happened to own a business there, making the lead credible. The witness led authorities to a Ramar Street apartment on February 11, 2003, where McGhee had lived off and on for the past year.

== Arrest ==
On February 11, 2003, a surveillance team in Bullhead City observed a man resembling the 29-year-old fugitive leaving the apartment in question, but conclusive identification was not possible in the dark. Investigators followed the suspect to a double-wide mobile home near Brill Street, but no arrest was made. Early February 12, after roughly 20 hours of surveillance, as authorities were preparing a search warrant and planning to raid the home with a SWAT team, U.S. marshals positively identified McGhee departing the residence with a female driver. Officers pulled the vehicle over around 1:00 PM on Roadrunner Drive, and McGhee was ordered out of the car and onto the ground in the presence of more than 25 officers of the LAPD, Bullhead City Police Department, and federal law enforcement. McGhee surrendered without a struggle, refusing to speak. When an LAPD officer who knew McGhee attempted to engage him in conversation, McGhee glared at him, smiling at spectators. The suspect wore a T-shirt that read "Run. Jump. Throw a donut," referring to the best way to elude a police officer. Another T-shirt was discovered in McGhee's possession that read "Fugitive. Can’t see me," exemplifying his sheer audacity. The female driver was unaware of McGhee's true identity, nor did she have any suspicion that he was a wanted man.

On February 13, McGhee appeared at the Mojave County courthouse in Kingman, Arizona, to begin extradition proceedings.

On February 15, 2003, season 16, episode 16 of America's Most Wanted aired after the fact. McGhee's story was outlined as well as the high-profile case of Elizabeth Smart, who had been missing for 256 days. The episode led to her rescue 25 days later and the arrest of her kidnapper Brian David Mitchell.

With McGhee in custody, the next logical choice for head of the Toonerville gang was Juan "Sharpie" Rodarte, a close associate of McGhee's. However, Rodarte was arrested later in 2003 for possessing a firearm and cocaine.

== Prison riot ==
While awaiting trial, McGhee was held without bail in the Los Angeles County Men's Central Jail, the largest single jail facility in the world just minutes south of Atwater Village. Being the charismatic leader that he was, he commanded the respect of equally intimidating criminals housed in cell block 3300 A-Row, the highest security area of the facility. McGhee was the shot caller, and fellow inmates would not act without his permission. He claimed to have been verbally and physically assaulted by deputies during his time in jail, even reporting one incident to the ACLU.

On January 7, 2005, at roughly 4:40 PM, inmate Rudolfo Gonzalez, intoxicated from a homemade alcoholic concoction, was to be removed from cell block A. Sheriff Deputy Raul Ibarra handcuffed Gonzalez and extracted him from his cell under the ruse of meeting with his attorney. Obediently, Gonzalez attempted to return to his cell, fearing something was amiss as he did not have an attorney. Upon changing direction, Gonzalez was tackled by four deputies. They passed McGhee's cell who stated that Gonzalez, an acquaintance of his since elementary school, did not have his permission to leave.

This incited McGhee's rage and he commanded inmates to assault the deputies with apples, oranges, urine, and bleach. It took 20 minutes to remove Gonzalez from the cell block successfully. McGhee then ordered inmates to break the sinks in their cells so jagged pieces of porcelain could be used as weapons. It was hours later, nearly 10:00 PM that evening when two deputies began their shifts and investigated the damage in A-Row. They were assaulted with books, fruit, porcelain, and various items as they entered. Inmates set multiple fires, and a riot squad was assembled to quash the rebellion. By 2:00 AM the following morning, all inmates had been removed from A-Row, most voluntarily surrendering but McGhee dragged out by force. Addressing the fact that an officer he assaulted survived the attack, McGhee was quoted as saying, "Next time I’ll have to stab him."

== McGhee's trial ==
On September 27, 2007, four and a half years after his capture, McGhee went on trial for the murders of Ronnie Martin, Ryan Gonzalez, and Marjorie Mendoza. Additionally, he was charged with the attempted murder of six individuals, including LAPD officers Thomas Baker and Carlos Langarica, Duane Natividad, Erica Rhee, Pedro Sanchez, and Juan Cardiel. Prosecutors initially charged the gang member with nine murders but dropped six charges before the trial began citing unreliable witnesses. McGhee was defended by attorneys H. Clay Jacke II and Franklin Peters Jr., attorneys with a combined 56 years of practice. In 2012, Jacke was appointed a Superior Court judge in Los Angeles County by California Governor Jerry Brown.

Superior Court Judge Robert J. Perry presided over the case. Perry has overseen several high-profile cases in Los Angeles, sentencing arsonist John Leonard Orr to life in prison in 1998 and dismissing drug conspiracy charges against Howard K. Stern in 2011 regarding the death of model Anna Nicole Smith.

In court, police and prosecutors described McGhee as a thrill killer, among the most feared gang members in Los Angeles. A chilling portrayal of the life of a gang member was presented with testimony of cold-blooded murder casually implemented to protect the organization's lucrative illegal drug business. Deputy District Attorney Hoon Chun stated that, unlike most gang members who kill for revenge, McGhee seemed to kill for sport, much like a serial killer. Evidence was presented that McGhee taunted at least one of his victims, saying, "Die like a man." before firing the fatal shot into his skull. While prosecutors detailed the horrific crimes, McGhee was amused. He frequently flashed a broad smile at spectators in the courtroom.

Despite his notorious reputation, the prosecution was able to solicit the testimony of McGhee's gang rivals, former gang affiliates, and even his accomplices. Several of these witnesses were under police protection for their safety while others had to be ordered to testify. However, intimidated by the mere presence of McGhee in court, a number of rival gang members drastically changed their testimonies. Cardiel and Sanchez now claimed they weren't sure who shot them a decade earlier. Even prosecutors, his own attorneys, and gang experts declined comment outside of court.

McGhee's incriminating hip hop lyrics were also used against him in court in which he detailed a number of his murders. He compared himself to fictional serial killer Freddy Krueger from the motion picture series A Nightmare on Elm Street and outlaw Jesse James. Residents of Atwater Village were terrified of the possibility that McGhee could be found innocent and subsequently released to terrorize the neighborhood again. Police had noted that crime escalated in the area when McGhee was not in custody. Meanwhile, McGhee's mother canvassed the neighborhood during his incarceration passing out leaflets that asked for prayer for her son.

=== Verdict ===
Early on in the deliberation process, a juror who favored the defense was removed for unspecified reasons and replaced by an alternate. On October 25, 2007, after a week of deliberations, eight men and four women found McGhee guilty of all three murders. He was also found guilty in the attempted murder of four other individuals including the two LAPD officers whose ambush he organized, and Duane Natividad and Erica Rhee who were shot in Atwater Village.

McGhee was acquitted of the attempted murders of Pedro Sanchez and Juan Cardiel, both of whom identified McGhee the night they were shot only to claim in court that they could not recall the perpetrator.

=== Sentence ===
On October 26, 2007, the death penalty phase of the trial began. McGhee was eligible for the death penalty because he was convicted of multiple murders and used homicide to further the activities of a criminal street gang. Prosecutors presented additional evidence that McGhee was involved in a fourth murder, that of Christina Duran. McGhee was not tried for her murder after so many witnesses refused to testify against him. On November 9, 2007, after days of deliberating, the same jury that convicted McGhee deadlocked on whether he should be executed or receive life in prison without parole. After three days of deliberations, the vote remained 10-to-2 in favor of the death penalty, so prosecutors elected to retry the penalty phase of the case.

On November 14, 2007, McGhee stood trial for his role in the 2005 prison riot. He was sentenced to 75 years to life after being found guilty of conspiracy to commit an assault, conspiracy to commit vandalism, three counts of resisting executive officers in the performance of their duties, and two counts of assault. On August 27, 2008, a second jury agreed unanimously that 35-year-old McGhee should be sentenced to death. On January 9, 2009, Judge Perry sentenced McGhee to death. McGhee was additionally sentenced to multiple consecutive life sentences for the four attempted murders. Perry stated that McGhee treated killing as "some kind of perverse sport, as if he was hunting human game." He continued "(McGhee) is a committed killer and an obvious danger to society." Since executions were halted in 2019 by California Governor Gavin Newsom, McGhee is serving life without parole and cannot be executed unless and until the moratorium is lifted.

=== Conviction and sentences overturned ===
On April 3, 2025, McGhee's murder conviction and death sentences were overturned on ground that juror was improperly dismissed during deliberations, California Supreme Court ruled that the record does not support as a demonstrable reality the court's ruling that the discharged juror was unable to fulfill his duties as a juror and that ruling was therefore discretion abuse.

== See also ==
- List of death row inmates in the United States
