= Temple Street (gang) =

Street gang in Los Angeles, California, US

Varrio Temple Street
- Founded: 1923
- Founding location: Los Angeles, California, United States
- Years active: 1920s - Present
- Territory: Central Los Angeles, Philippines(MBLS)Started 1993 at (Dapitan St. Metro Manila [North Side]Manila Boy Locos[MBLS]) 1995 at (South Side [PLS] Pinoy Locos)
- Ethnicity: Filipino American and Hispanic (predominantly Mexican American)
- Activities: Gang violence, murder, drug trafficking, gun trafficking, theft, burglaries
- Allies: Sureños, Satanas, Mexican Mafia, Florencia 13, MS-13, White Fence
- Rivals: Norteños, 18th Street gang

The Temple Street gang also known as "TST" or "Templero Surenos" is a street gang in the downtown Los Angeles area and was founded by Filipino and Mexican youths in the 1920s and 1930s. The gang is involved in murders, assaults, burglaries, drug trafficking, and gun trafficking. Their gang colors are blue and black.

== Rampart scandal ==
Rafael Pérez framed four members of the Temple Street gang as being associated with the murder of Mexican Mafia member Miguel "Lizard" Malfavon. The incident took place at a McDonald's on Alvarado Street, where four supposed members all planned to kill Malfavon while he tried to collect "taxes" from the gang. Pérez found a material witness who had blood on her dress, and she named four gang members from Temple Street. He repeatedly changed the name of the main killer and ended up framing Anthony "Stymie" Adams as the one who fatally shot Malfavon in the head with a rifle in the neighboring apartment.
