= Menace of Destruction =

- Founded: 1988
- Founding location: Fresno, California, United States
- Years active: 1988–present
- Territory: California, Wisconsin, Colorado, Minnesota, North Carolina, Georgia, Oregon, South Carolina, Michigan, Texas, Alaska, Washington, Oklahoma
- Ethnicity: Predominantly Hmong
- Criminal activities: prostitution, drug trafficking, weapon trafficking, assault, burglary, robbery, kidnapping, theft, and murder.
- Allies: Tiny Rascal Gang
- Rivals: Alliance, Asian Crips, Asian Family Gangsters, Fresno Bulldogs, Hmong Nation Society, Junior Criminal Crips, Laotian Posse, Oriental Ruthless Boys, Oroville Mono Boys, Ruthless Crip Gangsters, Tiny Rascal Gang,

Menace of Destruction (MOD), formerly known as Masters of Destruction, is a Hmong street gang created in 1988. Today, it is active in California, Midwestern United States and many places with large Hmong communities. It is known for murders, fights, shootings, and weapon and drug trafficking (mostly marijuana and methamphetamine).

MOD is one of the oldest active Asian street gang in Northern California and perhaps the largest Hmong gang in America. MOD is known as one of the most violent and notorious Asian gangs, it is the only Hmong gang that is officially recognized by the United States Government. MOD has its largest presence in California with members residing in the cities, Sacramento, Merced, Stockton and Fresno.

== History ==
By the end of the Vietnam War in the mid-1970s, new waves of refugees began settling in the United States. Among them were the Hmong; an indigenous people of Eastern China and Southeast Asia, who settled in American ghettoes, where they faced prejudice, bullying and racism. Hmong families were constantly robbed and physically assaulted. To counter such actions, Hmong youth banded together as a brotherhood, which eventually engaged in violence and criminal activities.

In 1988, a handful of Hmong youth broke off from one of the first Hmong gangs in California known as "Peace MOD", originally formed in 1985 in Fresno, California to combat other gangs preying upon the Hmong community. The splinter group formed the "Masters of Destruction" (MOD). Though the reason behind the breakup is unclear, it is suggested that a power struggle between members caused "Peace MOD" to break into three gangs, including the "Masters of Destruction", the "Mongolian Boys Society" (MBS) and the "Oriental Ruthless Boys" (ORB). The breakup of "Peace MOD" created rivalries between all three of them.

In 1991, MOD's name was changed to "Menace of Destruction" by the younger generation to better align with their youth. Its members were as young as 12 years old.

Fearing for their children's lives, Hmong parents either moved or sent their teenagers off to live with relatives in other towns or out of state. However, the relocation of gang members caused the gang to grow rapidly as members created their own cliques in their new settings to rival other local gangs. In Portland, Oregon, due to a small Hmong community, Vietnamese migrants were recruited to rival biker gangs and other street gangs. In the Midwest, one of Minnesota's first Hmong gang known as the White Tigers was eventually overtaken by MOD's presence in the Twin Cities.

MOD flexed its muscle through intimidation, fights and murders. Rival gang members would often become targets of ambush assaults in public areas or at popular Hmong cultural events such as the Hmong New Year celebrations and sports tournaments within the Hmong communities across America.

MOD is one of the oldest active Hmong gang in America and is one of the oldest active Asian street gang in Northern California. Many splinter groups have formed out of MOD that eventually became defunct or still exist as rival gangs. However, as with many gangs today, there is a dwindling membership within MOD as gang culture slowly fades out of appeal with urban Hmong youth due to growing prosperity from increased economic resources and opportunities in the Hmong communities. In addition, Hmong youth today have assimilated very well into American society by following the examples set by their parents who toiled through the migrant era for a better future for their families.

== Identification ==
Menace of Destruction members wear the color red, but sometimes blue and gray depending on the states they're in. They are also identified by gang-related tattoos such as their gang initial "MOD" and the numeric code "301". The three standing for "M", zero standing for "O", and combining the 0 and “1” forms a "D".

== Crimes ==
=== California ===
During 1993 in Sacramento, California, tensions between the Menace of Destruction and the Asian Family Gangsters were intense. Following the death of a young M.O.D gang member and a shooting at several Tiny Little Rascals; a junior version of M.O.D, the M.O.D retaliated by performing a drive-by shooting in North Sacramento Asian Family Gangsters' turf, killing a rival gang member. Around the same period, the Menace of Destruction killed a rival Lao member and another one two years later in 1995.

Two teens surrendered to Spokane police in connection with a California drive-by shooting after a six-hour standoff. The suspects are members of Menace of Destruction and were wanted on warrants charging them with violating parole and attempted murder in a January 6, 1998 drive-by shooting near Merced, California. A man was shot in the eye during that attack but survived. California authorities called Spokane police to tell them the teens might be in the area. Undercover officers staked out the house to confirm the two were staying there. The house was widely known for drug trafficking. The teens were believed to be heavily armed, with several pistols and possibly rifles or shotguns. At least a dozen SWAT team members with police dogs and high-powered rifles surrounded the house. Police searched the home and found several guns.

In 2002, the Menace of Destruction gang was the most active gang in Merced, California.

=== Minnesota ===
In February 2005, members of the Menace of Destruction were involved in a shooting attack on a group of Tibetan Americans that left two people; a Tibetan and a Cambodian American, dead and four others wounded outside a pool hall in Columbia Heights, Minnesota. The Tibetans were mistakenly thought to be members of a rival gang, and the two groups engaged into a fistfight. The fistfight escalated to bottles and other objects being thrown at each parties, and then multiple M.O.D. members retrieved firearms from their cars and opened fire at the Tibetans. Two men were arrested and convicted of first-degree murder, and six other gang members were convicted of lesser offenses. Two M.O.D gang members was sentenced to 126 years for the shooting, and another was sentenced to 6 years.

Yatau Her, Xee Lor and Fong Vang were M.O.D gang members also involved in the pool hall shooting. Yatau Her had escaped from a juvenile prison during a work release program in California. After the pool hall shooting, Yatau was involved in an armed robbery and attempted homicide at a local store in Eau Claire, Wisconsin, along with other local M.O.D gang members. The three gang members were spotted a few weeks later by two police authorities. At this point, Xee Lor shot and fired at the officers with a .38-caliber semiautomatic handgun. In return, the officers fired back, wounding Xee Lor. The three of them were captured the same day after a few hours of pursuit.

Two officers were patrolling in Saint Paul, Minnesota, when they spotted a fugitive from Menace of Destruction in February 2007. Mitchell Moua, the gang member, was wanted for aggravated assault, false imprisonment and federal weapons charges. During the pursuit, Mitchell fired shots at the officers while they fired back in return, resulting in Moua's car crash and death. Moua had turned the gun to himself instead of being taken alive.

A national drug ring based in Twin Cities was busted after months of surveillance and wiretaps in March 2012. The cartel La Familia smuggled millions of dollars' worth of methamphetamine from Mexico to Minnesota. The drugs then went through a local member of the cartel and the Menace of Destruction gang.

On July 10, 2013, a Menace of Destruction gang member was arrested with three felony counts of car theft and receiving stolen property in Woodbury, Minnesota. A detective working undercover spotted a Honda Accord in a parking lot. The car's license plate was not fastened properly to the car, and was hanging at an angle. The detective saw a man and a woman in the car. He ran the Honda's license plate and found that it was registered to a different vehicle. When he checked the car's vehicle identification number, he discovered it did not match the license plate and came up as a stolen vehicle. When the man and woman returned to the car, the detective arrested them. During a search, police found a set of keys, including a shaved key. The shaved key had been used to open the Accord's door, police said. The M.O.D gang member had a criminal record that included convictions for car theft, possession of dangerous weapons, possession of a short-barrel shotgun, burglary, fleeing police, criminal damage to property, obstructing justice and resisting arrest. In an unrelated case, the M.O.D gang member also pleaded guilty in October 2013 to a felony drug possession in Ramsey County.

Police were called on August 3, 2014, about a man who crashed his car, pointed a gun at a man and robbed him of his bike, fired shots at a passing car and carjacked another vehicle. The man robbed a 72-year-old bicyclist at gunpoint, but had trouble riding the bike because it required special shoes. He left the bike in the road and shot at a passing vehicle, which didn't stop, but a bullet hit the driver's door. A witness took photos of the carjacker and police saw that he was holding a black handgun. The man then was able to get in the back of a SUV, which had two men inside and forced them to drive. About two miles away, police caught up to the vehicle and pulled it over. The man exited and fired the gun at officers who returned fire, fatally wounding him. In past contact with the St. Paul police gang unit, the man admitted he was a member of the Menace of Destruction gang.

=== Oklahoma ===
Two men were accused of shooting five people at a Hmong New Year's festival in Tulsa, Oklahoma, in October 2013. Prosecutors believed one victim was the target because he mediated a dispute involving one of the suspects' family. The suspects were arrested shortly after the shooting when a police helicopter spotted a car driving away from the scene with its headlights off. They had thrown clothes and a semi-automatic handgun out of the vehicle, prior to their arrest. Prosecutors believed that one of the suspect is to be connected to the Menace of Destruction gang in California. Tulsa police also recovered guns, gang paraphernalia and ammunition after serving search warrants on two homes in connection with the shooting.

=== Wisconsin ===
Four members of the gang Menace of Destruction were involved in a Wausau-area tavern stabbing in July 1994. The stabbing incident, which occurred in Schofield, Wisconsin, landed a bouncer in the hospital with knife wounds after he attempted to break up a fight between two men over a stolen cassette tape. Around the same month, the M.O.D was involved in a dispute with two other gangs; the Laotian Posse and the Alliance. In Stevens Point, for instance, one incident involved gunfire. That hassle started with a fight in Wausau. During this time, M.O.D members were migrating to the Midwestern states while having a turf war with Tiny Rascal Gang in Fresno, California.

Menace of Destruction gang members attacked five girls in a car in Wausau during April 1995. Bottles were thrown at the vehicle and windows were smashed. The assault left one girl with a gash in her nose.

The Menace of Destruction and Oriental Ruthless Boys gangs were involved in a confrontation that erupted into a shooting that wounded two teenagers in June 2002 in Wausau, Wisconsin. Two carloads of young people from Oriental Ruthless Boys gang pulled up to a home where a party and porch cookout was taking place and exchanged words before the shooting happened. A man fired at least three shots into the crowd, wounding a 17-year-old girl and a 16-year-old boy in the leg. The boy has been connected to the gang Menace of Destruction, also known as Men of Destruction.

A rival gang member was sentenced to 18 years in prison for his role in a gang-related shooting in Eau Claire, Wisconsin on April 12, 2004. Several members of the Ruthless Crip Gangsters drove to the Eau Claire home of a member of the gang Menace of Destruction. Three to five shots were fired at a man after a verbal confrontation, one shot narrowly missing his head. One bullet hit a neighboring house, striking a couch inside where a woman was sitting.

Seventeen members of the Menace of Destruction gang were indicted in federal court in Milwaukee of March 2010. A federal criminal complaint charging people for being involved with the gang says they were involved in violence and in methamphetamine and ecstasy sales to support the gang and the gang members. The gang also wanted to promote solidarity within the local Hmong community, as well as throughout the United States. As part of the bust, several suburban residents were arrested for their alleged roles in selling "Menace of Destruction" drugs. Suspects were also arrested in Appleton, in Eau Claire, and in Minneapolis/St. Paul, Minnesota.

Fifteen members of the Menace of Destruction gang were charged for various crimes during the year of 2004 through 2009 in Milwaukee County, Wisconsin of May 2010. They were all charged with 18 counts altogether, including racketeering, aggravated battery while armed, burglary, endangering safety by use of a dangerous weapon, conspiracy to harbor a felon and perjury. During the years between 2004 and 2009, M.O.D. and other Hmong gangs such as Asian Crips were involved in a turf war with each other, which resulted in more than 120 shootings in the area.

In September 2011, an investigation led to eight people arrested for a meth trafficking ring by several agencies. Several homes were raided in Eau Claire and Chippewa Falls, Wisconsin. At least 1/4 pound of methamphetamine, small amount of other drugs and two hand guns were seized. One of the guns had its serial numbers removed. At least two of the men were responsible for distributing 13-pounds of meth to people in the Chippewa Valley. Some of the people arrested had ties to the gang M.O.D. or Menace of Destruction.
