= Azusa 13 =

Mexican-American street gang

- Founded: 1960s
- Founding location: Azusa, California, United States
- Years active: 1960s–present
- Territory: San Gabriel Valley
- Ethnicity: Mexican American
- Membership (est.): 401
- Activities: Murder; drug trafficking; extortion; assault; auto theft; robbery
- Allies: Mexican Mafia; Sureños
- Rivals: Sentinel Boys 13, Duroc, West Covina

Azusa 13 is a street gang based in Azusa in the eastern San Gabriel Valley area of Los Angeles. Started in the 1960s, it is now one of the most aggressive Sureño street gangs, currently claiming around 400 active members.

== Territory ==
Azusa 13 claims all of Azusa; however, they are most active in southern Azusa, the Atlantis Gardens neighborhood off Alosta and Rockvale Avenues, and in areas surrounding the downtown area around Azusa Avenue and Foothill Boulevard.

== Criminal activities ==
Like many other Mexican gangs, the 13 in the name stands for the letter "M", indicating its affiliation with the Mexican Mafia. The gang is known to tax drug sales in the area and funnels money to the Mexican Mafia.

== Involvement in hate crimes ==
The gang has been involved in terrorizing African-American residents in Los Angeles. 51 members of the Azusa 13 street gang have been indicted and convicted since 2011 for "terrorizing" African Americans in Azusa. In 2013, Santiago "Chico" Rios, a leader of the gang, was sentenced to 19 years and six months in prison by U.S. District Judge Gary A. Feess, according to the Times, and his hearing impaired son, Louie "Lil Chico" Rios, was given a 10-year sentence. Both had pleaded guilty to conspiring to attack African Americans and chase them out of Azusa, a gang policy established in 1992, the paper said. The attacks by this gang have been described as a campaign of ethnic cleansing by the Southern Poverty Law Center.

Much of the racially inspired murder and mayhem was and is being directed from far away from the streets and hills of Los Angeles. As the Intelligence Report detailed in the Winter 2006 issue the powerful Mexican Mafia, a prison-based gang, had given the "green light" to the many Latino gangs it controls in Southern California to terrorize and murder black people as part of the effort to drive them out.
