= OVS (gang) =

Mexican-American gang from Ontario, California

OVS – Onterio Varrio Sur – Onterio Varrio Sunkist
- Founded: 1950s
- Founding location: Ontario, California, United States
- Years active: 1950s–present
- Territory: San Bernardino, Orange, Riverside and Los Angeles counties
- Ethnicity: Chicano (Mexican American)
- Membership (est.): 450 (as of 2010)
- Activities: Murder, drive by shootings, contract killings, money laundering, arms trafficking, drug trafficking, racketeering, extortion
- Allies: Mexican Mafia; Sureños; Aryan Brotherhood; Peckerwoods
- Rivals: Crips, Bloods, BGF

OVS (Ontario Varrio Sur and also known as Onterio Varrio Sunkist) is a Mexican American (Chicano) gang from Ontario, California. As of 2010, the gang consisted of approximately 450 members. It contains two sub-cliques known as the Jr Black Angels and Black Angels. The main operating area is Sunkist Street located in South Ontario.

OVS has deep-rooted ties within the Mexican Mafia (a Californian criminal organization), with over a dozen active members within the La Eme organization.

== Criminal activity ==
According to Ontario Police Detective Brice Devey, the primary activity of the OVS gang is murder. Along with repeated activities such as robberies, assaults and narcotics sales.

OVS, as with most other Sureño gangs, are allegedly connected with Mexican drug cartels. Methamphetamine, cocaine, black-tar heroin, and marijuana are sold by street dealers who operate out of numerous hidden "trap-houses" where the product is stored and processed into smaller quantities. OVS also sells arsenals of illegal/stolen firearms, ranging from handguns to assault rifles, as well as knives, clubs, and other weapons.

OVS is also known for killing their own members, this is known as "cleaning house".

== History ==
=== Formation, creation of subgroups, and spread ===
In the early 1950s, the OVS Black Angels were formed, taking their name from a popular comic book of the time. Frank "Mosca" Castrejon was among the founders. Several years later, the Jr Black Angels were formed, recruiting teens as young as 11 years of age. Their original territory was in the southeast side of Ontario, and subsequently, they gained a foothold in the entire city of Ontario, including certain parts of the Inland Empire and surrounding counties.

In 1954, the OVS Earth Angels were formed. Some recall them as offshoots from the Black Angels. Like the Black Angels, they eventually formed a Jr version, with the Jr Earth Angels' age bracket being in their early 20s. Many families were divided, with one brother an Earth Angel while another was a Black Angel, along with cousins, uncles, aunts, etc. In the early years, the E.A.'s outnumbered the B.A.'s. Their original territory was in south Ontario.

In 1980, the Northside Ontario Calaveras street gang was formed. This gang never became as large as OVS but nonetheless gained notoriety in Ontario. In one incident in 1999, Northside Ontario Calaveras gang members were targeted in a shooting by members of Eastside Ontario 4th street YGW gang.

On June 22, 1987, Mary Lou Davilla Salazar, Lourdes Flores, and Francisco Delgado Ortiz were found murdered in a home on Sunkist street in south Ontario. This was a revenge hit for the murder of OVS gang member Tito Marines Jr. On June 25, 1987, high-ranking OVS Eme member and later La Eme Godfather Reuben "Tupi" Hernandez was arrested for the murders, and on July 19, 1988, he was sentenced to three consecutive life terms plus 16 years in state prison for these murders.

In 1990, the OVS Earth Angels 175 members gang and the female Earth Angelettes gang disbanded. Many senior members became official made members of the California Mexican mafia. There were many street versions of why the E.A.'s disbanded.

On November 9, 1993, East L.A. Benjamin "Topo" Peters (aged 54) replaced East L.A. Maravilla Joe "Peg Leg" Morgan as La Eme godfather. Peters was challenged for control of La Eme by OVS Black Angel Reuben "Tupi" Hernandez (aged 35), competing for leadership and godfather status of the California Mexican Mafia. Both were well known to many law enforcement officers in Los Angeles and southern California. Ultimately, Ruben "Tupi" Hernandez gained control of La Eme, which consisted of at least 1000 active La Eme members.

On May 1, 1995, 22 members and associates of the California Mexican Mafia (La Eme) were indicted on RICO charges, including La Eme godfather OVS Black Angel Reuben "Tupi" Hernandez. On September 3, 1997, Hernandez was sentenced to his fourth life term from the RICO charges.

=== Early 2000s arrests and proceedings ===
On January 20, 2005, OVS rival gang members Henry Valle, 18, and Narisco Perez, 18, were found shot dead in a minivan in the 4200 block of Los Serranos Boulevard in Chino Hills. Valle had mistakenly burglarized a home connected to Darryl Castrejon, one of the top Mexican Mafia enforcers and southern California shot-caller with ties to the Pomona's 12th Street gang.

In April 2006, OVS LA Eme members Darryl Castrejon, Arthur Garcia, Julio Ponce Felix Jr., and Ricardo Polanco were arrested for conspiracy to commit murder against fellow La Eme member "Frankie Buelna." They were included with the 57 Gang Members arrested from the Pomona Sharkies, with a seizure of more than six pounds of methamphetamine worth nearly $36,000, 18 pounds of methamphetamine ice worth $162,000, 36 grams of heroin, 14 grams of cocaine, more than $23,000 in U.S. currency, 11 pistols, several rifles and shotguns, and one grenade. In addition, during the arrests, agents seized nine more pounds of methamphetamine, one-half pound of heroin, 25 firearms, including an AK-47, and approximately $20,000 in U.S. currency. The investigation included the use of wiretaps, informants, extensive surveillance, and undercover agents.

Between 2006 and 2007, the Gangland TV series approached members from the OVS gang for an episode. The TV series was aware of their power struggle in the California Mexican mafia as well as the leadership and influence that OVS carried in the prison system and on the streets of southern California. OVS turned them down several times.

In September 2008, OVS gang member Cesar Albert Mora was sentenced to 58 years to life, including 25 years to life for an assault conviction plus five years for gang enhancements on an assault conviction. A 25-year-to-life term was imposed but stayed on the active gang participation conviction. With three prior serious felony convictions and three prior strikes, he was found guilty of assault with a deadly weapon for stabbing a victim at a house party and possession of a shank while in custody.

In September 2008, OVS La Eme members Ricardo Polanco and Arthur Garcia received sentences of 50 and 55 years to life for the murder of Frankie "Frankie B" Buelna in 2005. Buelna was green-lighted by longtime Eme top enforcer Darryl Castrejon for collecting taxes in his area without authorization.

On January 7, 2009, OVS La Eme member Darryl Castrejon failed to appear at a court hearing in Pomona Superior Court for the first time in three years, three days before the Frankie B murder plot trial. Castrejon posted a $1 million bail and disappeared. As of today, he has continued to elude law enforcement as a fugitive. He has been seen in Mexico and Central America and has direct ties to major drug cartels. He has been using the Inland Empire and L.A. gangs to ferry large quantities of drugs and cash across the border while remaining untouchable to federal and law enforcement agencies, effectively falling off the radar.

=== RICO proceedings and crackdown ===
In addition to RICO charges, the indictments alleged violent crimes in aid of racketeering, conspiracies to distribute heroin, methamphetamine, and firearms violations. The RICO conspiracy count in the indictments alleged a series of specific overt acts, including transporting narcotics from Mexico into the United States, shooting at police during a high-speed chase, an armed robbery of a convenience store, and the murder of an OVS Black Angel member "Paul Angel" who had run afoul of the gang.

A joint federal-state law enforcement operation led to the arrest of the OVS gang members and associates named in federal racketeering and narcotics indictments. The arrests were the result of the indictments returned by a federal grand jury in Los Angeles. The main indictment named a total of 52 defendants, 36 of whom were charged under the Racketeer Influenced Corrupt Organizations (RICO) Act. A second indictment charged another 10 defendants with narcotics trafficking violations.

In August 2012, the OVS Gang, along with the Pomona Sharkey's Gang and several other SGV gangs, were targeted as a narcotics distribution network, including members of an international drug trafficking organization. An investigation by the San Gabriel Valley Safe Streets Task Force resulted in the arrest of 27 defendants who faced federal narcotics charges for their roles in a methamphetamine distribution network. A federal grand jury returned an indictment in U.S. District Court in Los Angeles charging a total of 27 defendants, several of whom were already in custody. The indictment outlined hundreds of overt acts that formed the basis for the conspiracy to manufacture, possess, and distribute large quantities of nearly pure methamphetamine. The indictment charged the defendants for their roles in the distribution of methamphetamine, the possession with the intent to distribute methamphetamine, for conspiring to manufacture, possess with intent to distribute, and distribute methamphetamine, and maintaining drug-involved premises, all violations of the United States Code, Title 21.

On May 14, 2013, OVS gang members Danny Ray Contreras and James Edward Hall shot and killed a fellow OVS gang member who was "green-lighted." Both were convicted of first-degree murder, gun-use enhancements, and a gang enhancement. Both were sentenced to life.

On January 10, 2015, San Bernardino County's largest gang case ended with a total of 485 years of prison sentences, including charging OVS La Eme member Darryl Castrejon, who continued to elude authorities.

=== 2015–present ===
On February 20, 2015, OVS gang members Carlos "Chino" Rivera, Raul "Crook" Prieto, and Jessica Medina attempted to appeal their jury convictions arising out of activities connected with the OVS Black Angels. Prieto objected to the admission of testimony from Black Angels gang leader David Navarro regarding the meaning of the term "bird" and argued that the prosecution mischaracterized Navarro's testimony in its closing argument. However, Navarro's testimony was admissible as a lay opinion supported by his experience as the leader of the gang's extortion activities and participation in methamphetamine sales. The evidence was sufficient to allow a rational fact finder to convict Prieto based on the distribution of methamphetamine. The recorded telephone calls demonstrated Prieto's willingness to sell half an ounce of a larger supply of a controlled substance. Prieto never questioned Rivera regarding what type of drugs Rivera was expecting when he "re-upped," allowing for a reasonable inference that Prieto understood Rivera's reference. This inference was bolstered by Navarro's testimony that Rivera had conducted methamphetamine deals from Prieto's mother's house in Prieto's presence and with Prieto's knowledge, demonstrating that Prieto knew that Rivera trafficked in methamphetamine. Finally, Rivera was arrested with nearly half a pound of high-purity methamphetamine following his conversation with Prieto. Because a conviction could be proven through circumstantial evidence and inferences drawn from that evidence, and because a reasonable fact finder could conclude that Prieto knew Rivera was distributing methamphetamine and that Prieto was requesting half an ounce of methamphetamine to sell, Prieto's argument failed.

From February 2020 to the present, OVS and other San Bernardino county gangs, along with the San Gabriel Valley gangs (the Surenos alliance), heightened their Mexican Mafia orders and agreed to terrorize and kill African Americans, including members of the Crips and Bloods, in their territories.

== High ranking members ==
=== Tupi Hernandez ===
A veteran of OVS (Sunkist St-Black Angels), Tupi joined La Eme during one of the frequent trips behind bars he made during his late teens. Tupi, along with his best friend Tito Marines, led OVS in battle against other well-established surrounding gangs.

Tupi's devotion and eagerness to please his superiors in La Eme led him to become known as one of the most dangerous inmates in the California prison system – a designation he would prove when his buddy Marines was killed while he served an 8-year sentence for robbery. Upon his release, Tupi promptly returned to his old haunts where he chastised the younger members of OVS for failing to take care of business, meaning kill a list of people he had passed down through the "prison information network" before his release. Prime on his list of people to kill was Mary Lou Davila Salazar, the woman he deemed responsible for Marines' murder. During a series of meetings with the most promising Eme recruits from OVS, Tupi warned the youngsters to stay off of the street Salazar lived on, and secured an arsenal of weapons to complete his mission of revenge. In an event which shocked the city of Ontario, Tupi entered Salazar's house on the morning of June 22, 1987 and savagely beat and executed not only Salazar, but also her young roommate and her boyfriend.

Police immediately determined that Tupi was responsible. Within 48 hours of the vicious episode, Tupi was behind bars for what would turn into a life sentence. Convicted of the triple homicide, Hernandez received a life sentence for each of his victims. During the trial, evidence of his Eme ties was introduced, and it quickly became apparent that Tupi Hernandez was much more than just a street soldier. Testimony was introduced that veteran Eme members referred to him as "sir" and fawned at the chance to please him. It would be years before his true status in the gang became known.

=== Darryl "Dashing D" Castrejon ===
One of the top leaders of the OVS family and one of the Mexican Mafia top leaders in California, Darryl Castrejon's leadership and influence as an enforcer has spawned a new breed of soldiers and recruits for La Eme throughout California. This currently free leader from OVS is known to have major influences with southern California gangs, thus making OVS a valuable ally within the Sureno network. He is also known for controlling the drug trade in the state of California.

He is known as the ambassador of the OVS La Eme and the "shot caller" of the OVS Black Angels.

== See also ==
- Surenos
- List of California street gangs
