= Armenian Power =

Armenian-American crime syndicate

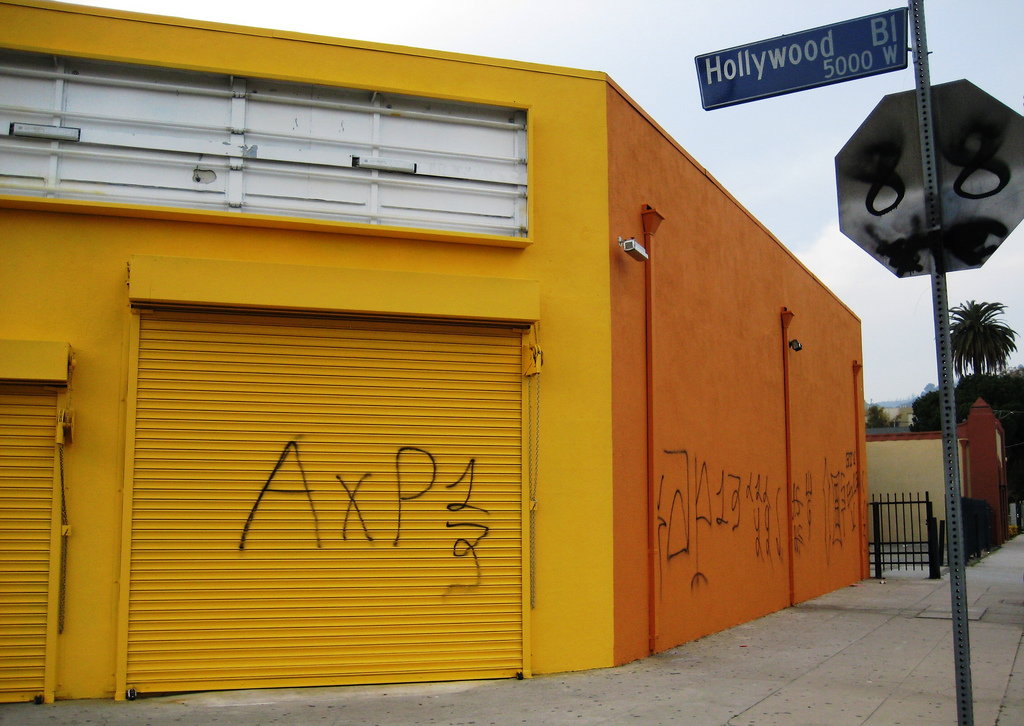
- Armenian Power graffiti in Little Armenia
- Founded: 1989
- Founder: Armen Petrosyan
- Founding location: East Hollywood, Los Angeles, California, United States
- Years active: 1989–present
- Territory: Glendale, Burbank, Hollywood, Little Armenia (California), Dallas and Houston (Texas)
- Ethnicity: Armenian American
- Membership (est.): approximately 250
- Activities: Racketeering, murder, assault, kidnapping, extortion, fraud, illegal gambling, and drug trafficking
- Allies: Italian-American Mafia; Armenian mafia Mexican Mafia; Russian mafia Lebanese mafia Cachiros; Some Sureños sets Vineland Boys
- Rivals: Toonerville Rifa 13

Armenian Power 13, also known as AP, the Armenian Mob, or Armenian Mafia is an Armenian-American criminal organization and street gang founded and currently based in Los Angeles County, California. They are involved in drug trafficking, murder, assault, fraud, identity theft, illegal gambling, kidnapping, racketeering, robbery and extortion. They are believed to have around 200 members and hundreds of associates, according to the U.S. attorney’s office. They are also well known for their connections with the Mexican Mafia.

== History ==
Armenian Power is believed to have been organized in the late 1980s by Armenian-American gangster Armen “Silent” Petrosyan. When 15-year-old Armen Petrosyan arrived in East Hollywood from Armenia in 1989, he encountered larger, long-established street gangs that often preyed upon the smaller and more recent group of Armenian immigrants. Petrosyan and his friends formed a defensive alliance from existing Armenian immigrant and Armenian-American gangs in the area, and the subsequent criminal organization grew into the Armenian Power street gang, which, at its peak in the mid-1990s, had about 120 members.

In the summer of 1988, two dozen Armenian and Armenian-American gang members took over the parking lot of a mini-mall in East Hollywood and turned it into their headquarters. They intimidated patrons of the mall's restaurants and clothing stores, forcing the shop owners to hire some off-duty LAPD officers for security. The members of this gang were subsequently incorporated into Armenian Power.

However, despite its street gang origins, Armenian Power is closely connected to and considered part of the larger Armenian mafia. According to a 1996 report by the Office of the California Attorney General, Armenian Power also has strong ties to Russian organized crime. By mid-1997 the Armenian Power gang was believed to be responsible for a dozen driveby murders.

AP leadership also maintains ties to Armenia and Russia and deals directly with high level Armenian/Russian organized crime figures.

Gang activity has never been reported in East Coast, Midwestern, Northern or Southern Armenian-American communities primarily composed of Van (central) Armenians, Syrian-Armenians and Iraqi-Armenians. The unique ethnic composition of the Los Angeles area, which had a strong presence of many different gangs, played a major role in the creation of the Armenian Power gang.

Though on the street-level Armenian Power may seem to be merely a loosely organized youth street gang, the street gang component is merely one aspect of the organization, with younger street gang members often serving as the enforcement arm or "soldiers" for a more organized Armenian-American criminal organization consisting of higher-up members. Armenian Power's status as a highly organized crime group rather than simply a street gang became apparent when Armenian-American gangsters were found to be involved in the 2010 Medicaid fraud case and the 2011 FBI-led Operation Power Outage. According to the official FBI website: "The Southern California crime ring called Armenian Power may look like a traditional street gang—members identify themselves with tattoos and gang clothing—but the group is really an international organized crime enterprise whose illegal activities allegedly range from bank fraud and identity theft to violent extortion and kidnapping."

On November 4, 2019, Armenian Power "shot caller" Mher Darbinyan was sentenced to a 32-year prison term. He faces deportation to Armenia once he is released.

=== Mexican-Armenian conflict ===
Armenian Power has had a history of conflict with Sureño gangs, which are controlled by the Mexican Mafia, in the past, but the war is thought to have ended in recent years. Armen "Silent" Petrosyan, a founder of Armenian Power, was shot to death on May 22, 2000 by Jose Argueta, a member of the Sureño White Fence gang. In 2000, the murder of a 17-year-old Mexican-American outside of Hoover High School in Glendale by Armenian Power members sparked dialogue to find ways to help end the war between the gangs.

Today the Mexican Mafia prison gang collects protection money from Armenian Power, which has added the number 13 to its name as a sign of loyalty. The two gangs, and the Sureños, now work together to both control and extort protection money from criminal activities in the Los Angeles area.

=== Involvement in the Syrian Civil War ===
In 2014, two previous residents of the Los Angeles area who declared themselves members of Armenian Power were videotaped in Syria fighting in support of then-Syrian President Bashar al-Assad.

== Investigations and prosecutions ==
=== Operation Power Outage ===
On February 16, 2011 during Operation Power Outage over 900 federal and local law enforcement authorities arrested nearly 100 people allegedly involved in Armenian organized crime in the Los Angeles area. Much of the crime was white collar in nature, including identity theft crimes such as credit card skimming. The range of crimes included kidnapping, fraud, extortion, identity theft, loansharking, robbery, witness intimidation, drug trafficking, drug charges including marijuana cultivation and bringing narcotics into prison, gun-related offenses, and murder.

== In popular culture ==
- A fictionalized version of the gang, titled "Armenian Might", appeared in multiple seasons of the FX drama series The Shield, which starred Michael Chiklis as Detective Vic Mackey. The Armenian Might is a minor antagonist in seasons 1 and 2, the main antagonist of seasons 3 and 6 and the secondary antagonist of season 7.
- A fictional Armenian Mob appears in the video game Grand Theft Auto V. Franklin Clinton’s former employer, Simeon Yetarian, is associated with the gang. Many of the younger members of the group dress in the typical Chicano style much like the Armenian Power.
- NCIS-Los Angeles mentions the Armenian Mob several times, particularly in Season 2, Episode 11.
- A fictionalized Armenian Power appears in Ray Donovan Season 3, particularly in Episode 10 "One Night in Yerevan".
- A gang of Armenians is featured in the 2016 crime movie Message from the King.
- In Chapter 40 of House of Cards, a member of the Armenian Power gang has dialogue in a prison scene.
- In The Rookie, a fictional branch of the Armenian Mob called the Derian crime family appear as the antagonist for the last two episodes in season two and the first episode of the third season.

== See also ==
- History of the Armenian Americans in Los Angeles
- 2010 Medicaid fraud
- Armenian mafia
