= Wilmas 13 =

Gang in California

- Territory: Wilmington, California
- Ethnicity: Mexican-American
- Activities: Illegal arms and drug trafficking, murder, extortion

Wilmas 13 (W13) is a Mexican American gang from Wilmington, Los Angeles, California that is controlled by the Mexican Mafia. It has four sub-gangs, Eastside Wilmas, Westside Wilmas, Northside Wilmas, IMG Insane MEXICAN Gang whose low-level members are rivals, top-level members report to the Mexican Mafia. The Wilmas 13 gangs are led, through the means of contraband electronic devices, by members of the Mexican Mafia who are held in California state prisons.

In 2016 twenty-nine members were charged with federal racketeering offenses that included violent crimes and drug trafficking. That, and other indictments demonstrate the gang has a murderous effect on its local community. The 2016 indictment also claimed the gang engaged in discriminatory practices, such as attacking Blacks who try to move into the area.

In 2017, a Los Angeles court issued a civil injunction against the Wilma 13 gangs, which prevented them from associating in public in Wilmington. A prior injunction had been found to violate gang members' civil rights by requiring them to stay indoors unless they had a good, legal reason not to.

In 2020, when Los Angeles police officers arrested Gregorio Lopez Amaya, a member of Eastside Wilmas in his home, they found firearms and ammunition belonging to another Eastside Wilmas member, Carlos Reyes, who was held at Centinelas State Prison for murdering his ex-wife. Social media messages showed Amaya was selling drugs for Reyes. But Reyes' release after serving only a few months in jail made other Wilmas members so wary of him they sought permission to beat him up from Reyes and Gabriel Huerta. Huerta is a member of Eastside Wilmas becoming a member of the Mexican Mafia in Pelican Bay State Prison where he is serving seventeen years to life for a 1984 murder.

Mafia member Raoul Molina has been in custody at Pelican Bay State Prison since his 1995 conviction for murder. In October of 2022, an FBI informant messaged Molina through social media on a smartphone, asking for a source of drugs. A few minutes later a response came from another individual. This person turned out to be Daniel Nunez, currently serving time in San Quentin's death row. The informant then gave Nunez the cell number of a covert agent and, over the next five months, Nunez sold the agent firearms, meth and fentanyl and had them delivered by members, Wilmas members, including Patricia Amelia Limon, who delivered the illegal goods multiple times. Molina even contacted the informant to be certain Nunez' services had been satisfactory.

That same month, the same informant contacted Gabriel Huerta for another plainclothes FBI agent. Huerta told the informant that someone would contact him. A few minutes later Carlos Reyes called the agent and agreed on a sale of drugs. Bud John Phineas, a minor actor who is also a Wilmas member, delivered the drugs.

In 2023 the partnership between the FBI and the Los Angeles Police Department that had orchestrated these investigations arrested members of Westside and Eastside Wilmas on charges of trafficking firearms and fentanyl by the pound. Eighty weapons and pounds of the drug were confiscated, along with much more methamphetamine and cocaine. Law enforcement had electronically surveilled top-level gang members.

Among those arrested were Phineas and Limon. They both pled guilty to the charges. Limon was sentenced to 8 years of imprisonment.
