= Four Seas Gang =

Criminal organization based in Taiwan

The Four Seas Gang, or FSG (四海幫, or Si Hai Bang) is a triad society based in Taiwan and founded in May 1954. It includes mainland Chinese and their descendants who fled to Taiwan with the KMT. The Four Seas Gang has an estimated membership 10,000 in Taiwan. Its members have extended their influence to cities in the southern region of California. Its American constituents are a branch off of the original Taiwan society. There are also smaller factions that are merely street gangs, warring with other gangs of low notoriety. Four Seas Gang is active in alien smuggling in Southern California. Their territories are mainly Los Angeles and Santa Ana California. They use the color grey for their individual clothing for the gang.

== Historical leadership ==
=== Boss (official and acting) ===
- 1954-1962 — "Big Feng" Feng Chu-yu
- 1971-1986 — "Wei-Min" Liu Wei-min
- 1986?-1994? — "King Tsai" Tsai Kuan-lun
- 1990?-1994? — "Big Bao" Chen Yung-ho
- 1994?-1997 — "King Chao" Chao Ching-hua
  - Acting 1997-2000 — "Kuang-Nan" Yang Kuang-nan
- 2000-2008 — "Old Chia" Chia Jun-nien
- 2008-2010 — "Kid Chang" Chang Chien-ying
- 2010-2012 — "Young Kay" Yang Yu-pin
- 2012-2021 — "De-Yun" Yang Te-yun
- 2021-present — "Chun-Wei" Chang tsun-wei

== Organization ==
Since the 1950s development, Four Seas Gang organization has 86 branches, members and partner relations up to 50,000 people.
