= Satanas (gang) =

Filipino-American street gang

- Satanas gang logo
- Founded: 1972; 54 years ago
- Founding location: Los Angeles, California, United States
- Years active: 1972–present
- Territory: Los Angeles County, 805 County, California, Orange County, California, San Diego County, California, Inland Empire, the Philippines
- Ethnicity: Filipino American
- Activities: Gang violence, murder, drug trafficking, theft
- Allies: Avenue King Crips, Temple Street (gang)
- Rivals: Avenues, Bahala Na Gang

The Satanas gang (aka Ese Te Ese, or STS) is a Filipino American street gang in Southern California, founded in 1972. It is believed to be the oldest Filipino-American street gang in Los Angeles.

== History ==
Satanas was a clique from Temple Street since the 1920s that went solo in the 1970s. In 1972, a car club group started in the Los Angeles area by some Filipino Americans who had formed a cultural bond in a city where they were a minority. At first the club was exclusively for Filipinos. They soon branched out to other California cities including San Diego, La Puente, Cerritos, Oxnard Long Beach, Norwalk, North Hollywood, West Covina, Chino, Chino Hills, Santa Ana, San Gabriel, Buena Park, Delano, Palmdale, Anaheim, Vallejo, and San Jose and have reached other states on the east coast like New Jersey and New York, and the Philippines.

Some other Filipino gangs such as the Demonios and Diablos (not the Mexican gang of the same name) claim their roots to Satanas, having originated amongst second generation STS members and younger siblings of individuals who were members of STS; the founders of many other Filipino American gangs were originally members of Satanas.

Since there were cultural similarities between Filipinos and Mexicans, many of Ese Te Ese's older members and leaders allied with Chicano gangs in its early years within their surrounding neighborhoods. Accounts of Los Angeles gang history often placed both Filipinos and Mexicans side by side with each other during various street wars.

== Notable crimes ==
=== Francisco Gamez and Luis Silva ===
In December 1982, eight members of the Satanas gang were found guilty in a trial for the killing of Francisco Gamez and Luis Silva who were not gang members but were mistaken as ones. Gamez and Silva chased two cars each carrying four members of Satanas. Gunshots had been fired from the two cars just behind the Gamez home. Gamez and Silva gave chase for at least two miles. At the end of the chase, Gamez was shot in the head and Silva was shot in the back, shoulder and head as he tried to escape.

=== Manuel Rodriguez ===
In November 1989 Manuel Rodriguez, a member of the Lemonwood Chiques gang, was shot and killed by Arnell Salagubang, a member of the Satanas gang. Salagubang and Manuel Rodriguez had been arguing in front of Channel Islands High School. Salagubang pulled out a small caliber handgun and shot Rodriguez in the head. Salagubang fled the scene, but a witness was able to get his license plate number. The witness turned the information over to the police who arrested Salagubang the next day.
