= El Monte Flores =

Mexican-American street gang

- Founded: 1950; 76 years ago
- Founding location: El Monte, California, United States
- Years active: 1950–present
- Territory: El Monte, South El Monte and the San Gabriel Valley
- Ethnicity: Chicano (Mexican American)
- Membership (est.): Over 2000
- Activities: Drug trafficking, assault, robbery, extortion, arms trafficking, theft, murder, hate crimes, racketeering, money laundering, and fraud
- Allies: Mexican Mafia; Sureños
- Rivals: Bassett Grande and NS/ES Bolen, Lomas, Sangra, Azusa 13

El Monte Flores, also known as EMF, is a Mexican-American criminal street gang based in California. It is the largest Hispanic gang in San Gabriel Valley and one of the oldest in Los Angeles County.

== History ==
Also known as EMF, the gang has had an estimated unknown number of members but has thousands of active members since it was formed in the 1940s. The gang claims South El Monte, El Monte, North El Monte, and Mayflower Village as its turf. The gang's name comes from the Barrio Las Flores, named for the flower field & nurseries in the El Monte area.

== Location ==
Police reports have suggested that their reach has even been seen in Victorville, California, Arizona, Washington (state), New Mexico, Chicago, Florida. The original cliques are in El Monte, California, as well as South El Monte, but like many gangs, members are beginning to migrate to various other cities and states across the country. A chapter has even been established in Seattle, Washington. El Monte Flores still maintains a strong hold in their original territory despite repeated attempts from law enforcement to break the gang. El Monte Flores claims all of El Monte, California, South El Monte, California, North El Monte, California, & Mayflower Village, California but is most active east of the Rio Hondo River, mainly in the southern portion of the city. Major hangouts include the San Gabriel Valley Boys & Girls Club, Dead-End ValeWood, Little 5 Points liquor, Dead-End Dodson, Wild Flower St, Legg Lake Park, Alpaca St, Valley Mall, Arceo Park, Dee st, Zamora Park, Mountain View Park, Dead-End CogsWell, Fletcher Park, Maxson St, Dead-End MooreHouse, Continental St, Central St, Dead-End Sastre, Potrero St, New Temple Park, Lambert Park, Mansion Trailers, Parkway Dr, and the KlingerMan-BonWood Apartments.

== Culture ==
Even though El Monte Flores are a Sureño gang and use the number 13 (to denote the 13th letter, M, in the alphabet.) they are rivals with a variety of other Sureño gangs. Members usually tattoo the words, "Monte Flores", "El Monte F", "Flores", "EMF", "EMFxTMS" on them. XIII, X3, 13 and 3 dots are also seen with Sureño gang members and their colors are blue and gray. Like all Sureños once they are in the prison system they set aside their rivalry and unite under the Sureño Banner and are controlled by La eMe.

== Criminal activity ==
The El Monte Flores gang has been documented being involved in various criminal activity, and is one of the largest and most notorious gangs in Southern California. Their main source of income is from the illegal sale of heroin, crystal meth, cocaine, marijuana, prostitution, ecstasy, & PCP. EMF gang-members are well known for trafficking in illegal narcotics, along with other crimes like battery to murder, as well as robbery, burglary, carjacking, witness intimidation, kidnapping, weapons trafficking, credit card fraud and identity theft, racketeering, drug and weapons-related charges, money laundering & hate crimes against blacks.

In May 2016, EMF gang member Christian " Lafargo, aged 30, was sentenced to 21 months in prison after pleading guilty to multiple charges, including racketeering, attempted murder, conspiracy to commit murder and the unlawful discharging a firearm.

In October 2016, Kenneth Cofer, 57, and John Rivera, 54, were sentenced to 1 years and 10 months, respectively after pleading guilty to racketeering and drug charges.

On July 10, 2017, Alfredo Rodriguez (EMF member) and another felon shot to death Keefe Ofakitonga outside his residence when he confronted them about littering in front of his home, based on police reports.
