= Lopers 13 =

Mexican-American street gang

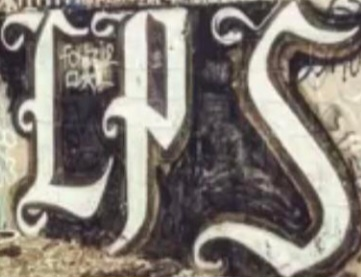
- Lopers 13
- Founded: Mid-1970s to 1980s
- Founding location: Santa Ana, California
- Years active: 1970s–present
- Territory: Orange County
- Ethnicity: Mexican American
- Rivals: • Calle Walnut Rifa • Logan Street • Delhi 13 • FXTroop • EastSide Santa Ana • WestSide Santa Ana • Locotes • Lowell Street • Krazy Proud Criminals • Little Minnie Street • Tustin 13 • Anaheim Boys From The Hood • Barrio Small Town • We Don't Care • Tiny Raskal Gang • Asian BoyZ • Crazy Brother Clan • Akrho Pinoy

Lopers 13 gang, also known as LPS or LPS13, is a gang that was founded by Mexican Americans in Madison Park in Santa Ana, California in the 1970s or 1980s. It is the biggest gang in Santa Ana by territory.

== Territory ==
Lopers 13 has territory in Main Street, Minnie Street, First Street and Edinger Ave. In November 2016, eight suspected members of Lopers 13 were arrested in a coordinated law enforcement operation within or near this territory. The Santa Ana Police SWAT team served warrants at three locations near Standard Street and McFadden Avenue, seizing methamphetamine, cocaine, Xanax, and a rifle. The arrests targeted gang members allegedly involved in drug sales, conspiracy, and other crimes. The operation involved the Santa Ana Police gang unit, probation, the Orange County District Attorney's Office, and the FBI.
