= Fresno Bulldogs =

Street gang in Fresno, California

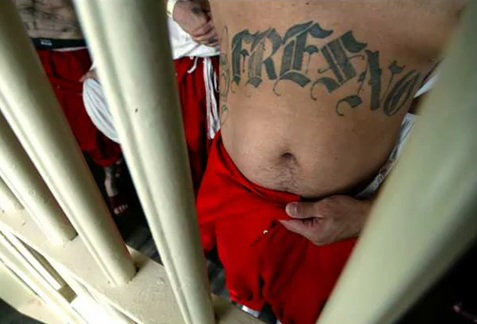
- Fresno Bulldog gang member in the Fresno County Jail
- Founded: 1984
- Membership (est.): 12,000
- Criminal activities: human trafficking, drug trafficking, identity theft, assault, theft, robbery, arms trafficking, extortion, murder, rape
- Rivals: Sureños; Mexican Mafia; Norteños; Nuestra Familia

Fresno Bulldogs, or BDS for short, also known by the abbreviations FBD and F-14, are a primarily Mexican American criminal street and prison gang located in 559, California. They are considered to be one of the biggest drug gangs in Central California with membership estimated to be in the cities of Fresno, Selma, Kerman, Sanger, Clovis, Madera, San Joaquin, Coalinga, Huron, Mendota, Orange Cove, and Avenal. They are engaged in a wide range of criminal activity and have been subject to many high-profile cases over the years. Fresno Bulldogs are largely conflicted with other prison gangs and are the biggest Hispanic gang in California unaffiliated with Sureños or Norteños.

== History ==
The Fresno Bulldogs can be traced back to the 1970s but did not become an independent street gang until the 1980s. Their independence developed in the California prison system during the prison wars of 1984—1985. Back when there was still an allegiance between Norteños and F-14ers, the gang was known as F-14. In 1986 the F-14ers went to war with the Norteños, which led to a violent war in the California prison system known in gang folklore as "The Red Wave". The F-14ers began using the bulldog name and mascot of Fresno State University including the paw print and bulldog head image in their graffiti and tattoos. They also bark to one another as a call sign, "Bulldog Calling" and address each other as "Dog", "Perro" or "Efe". They also adopted Fresno State apparel as de facto uniforms; causing a tenfold increase in royalties to the university from licensed merchandise sales from the 1990s to late 2000s (decade).

== Location and sets ==
The Fresno Bulldogs are found across the city in different neighborhoods and outside of the city limits. The gang has a presence in minor cities outlying Fresno as well, including but not limited to Clovis, Sanger (Sanger Bangers), Dinuba, Reedley, Kerman, Coalinga, Parlier, Selma (VSR), and Fowler. The cities outside of Fresno directly are referred to as "County Dogs". Most sets are referred to by their corresponding neighborhoods and sides of the city. "Eastside Bulldogs" include neighborhoods located on Fresno's Eastside & Southeast side. They often represent their set with the letters "ESF", for East Side Fresno. Sets include the Bond Street Bulldogs, McKenzie Street Bulldogs, 5th Street Bulldogs, Backer Street Bulldogs, Fresno Flats Bulldogs, Calwa Bulldogs, Eastside Bulldogs, Lewis Street Bulldogs, Butler Park Bulldogs, Daisy Park Bulldogs, Floradora Bulldogs, and Sunny City Bulldogs. Fresno's westside, often represented by the three letters WSF or simply Westside Fresno, features College Street Bulldogs, Westside Bulldogs, Malaga Bulldogs, Parkside Bulldogs, and Sunset Bulldogs. Fresno's Northside, represented by the three letters NSF or Northside Fresno, is home to the Highway City Bulldogs, Northside Bulldogs, Marty Block Bulldogs, Pinedale Bulldogs, and Pleasant Street Bulldogs. There are several other Bulldog sets that do not have a neighborhood per se, but instead operate throughout the city such as DLG (Dog Life Gangster) Bulldogs, RTL (Ruthless Thug Life) Bulldogs and Primos Bulldogs.

== Culture ==
The Fresno Bulldogs do not have any allies and are one of the few gangs in California unaffiliated with the Bloods, Crips, Sureños, or Norteños.

== Criminal activity ==
Their main revenue is from the street-level distribution of cannabis, heroin, and methamphetamine. The Fresno Police Department and the Fresno County Sheriff's Department have tried various different crackdowns on Bulldog gang activity. In November 2006, Operation Magic was launched to wipe out the Bulldog street gang. The operation has led to thousands of arrests, but the independent nature of the gang has complicated police efforts to contain crimes attributed to gang members. The Fresno Police Department's efforts have led to 2,422 felony arrests of Bulldog gang members and associates. However, even with increased gang suppression tactics, the Bulldog gang continues to exert its influence on the community. Bulldogs gang members sometimes fight each other because of affiliation with a rival Bulldog gang set.

== In prison ==
One rising concern in the California State Prison System as well as the Fresno County Jail and Fresno County Juvenile is gang violence between the large Hispanic gangs, particularly the Fresno Bulldogs, Norteños, and Sureños. At the heart of the problem is the Fresno Bulldogs, who have participated in over 32 battles with other prison gangs from 2018 to 2019, ranging from small fights to full-scale prison riots, according to data prepared for the AP by the inspector general's office. Many correctional officers have often stated the members of Fresno's notorious Bulldogs gang have been particularly resistant to peacemaking, with gang members brawling in what critics labeled “gladiator fights”. Officials say the Bulldogs are the highest security threat in the Fresno County Jail. The Bulldogs are also considered one of the highest security threat groups in many of California's State Prisons, such as Corcoran State Prison, Pleasant Valley State Prison, Soledad State Prison, and Valley State Prison. Within the last 5 years, the Bulldogs have started small-scale to large-scale riots in each of these prisons.
