= White Fence =

Mexican-American street gang

- Founded: 1900
- Founding location: Boyle Heights, Los Angeles California, United States
- Years active: 1900 – present
- Territory: East and West Los Angeles, Hollywood, Las Vegas, El Paso, Florida, Mexico and Central America
- Ethnicity: Mexican American
- Allies: Mexican Mafia; Sureños (some other sets)
- Rivals: All Maravilla sets, Varrio Nuevo Estrada, Armenian Power, others flats gangs,People v. Galarze leagle.com (January 3, 2011)</ref>

White Fence (also known by the acronym WF) is a predominantly Mexican American street gang in the Boyle Heights neighborhood of East Los Angeles.

== History ==
White Fence is one of the oldest gangs in Los Angeles. The gang itself claims its history goes back as far as 1900, although the gang did not emerge until the 1910s in the form of the all-male sports team associated with the La Purissima Church. The group was originally referred to as La Purissima Crowd, but gradually changed its name to White Fence, after the white picket fence that surrounded La Purissima Church. The gang's name has also been interpreted as a "symbolic barrier" between the white residents in the area and the Hispanic residents of the neighborhood, at a time when racism plagued the area. During the 1950s and 1960s, White Fence was considered one of the "most violent and powerful gangs in East Los Angeles." The rivalry between the gang and another Hispanic gang, El Hoyo Maravilla, is one of the longest, ongoing feuds in all of Los Angeles, a rivalry going back to the 1930s. White Fence was the first gang in East Los Angeles to use firearms, chains and other dangerous weapons.

White Fence is an old established gang territory in Boyle Heights adjoined to East Los Angeles.

E/S Varrio White Fence (WF) is one of the oldest and most influential Chicano street gangs in East Los Angeles, with roots going back to the late 1910s and 1920s. The gang formed around a white picket fence that was at the dead end of Guirado Street (corner of Fresno) above the “hole” in Boyle Heights. By the 1940s and 1950s, White Fence became known for its organization, size, and early use of structured neighborhood identity, making it one of the first gangs in L.A. to develop a strong barrio-based culture. Over the decades, E/S White Fence became deeply tied to the history of East L.A. its migrations, community struggles, and conflicts cementing its reputation as a long standing, historically significant varrio in Southern California. White Fence has pushed itself into many territory-based beefs as it firmly engraved itself in Eastern Chicano Culture. Based throughout Boyle Heights, they push up on a majority of sets in the area, engaging in territorial beefs with neighborhoods like Tiny Boys X3 (TBS), KAMSTERS X3 (KAM), Armernian Power X3 (APX3), and many other gangs that tried to gain a foothold within the area. Originally known as the Purissima Crowd, due to their close vicinity with the Purissima Church and the surrounding White Fences, they repped hard for their surrounding neighborhood, eventually renaming themselves as Varrio White Fence as they gained notoriety. They have a strong presence within the street, and gangs such as the Avenues (AVES), Frogtown (FTR), Hazard (BH), and other sections in the area originally derived from Varrio White Fence.
