= Westside Locos =

Mexican-American street gang

Westside Locos 13 or simply Westside Locos is a predominantly Latino-American street gang based in San Fernando Valley Glendale with history dating back to the 1950s. They reside mainly in the Riverside Rancho neighborhood, and their main subset or "clique" is Chicos Malos or "Lake street", which street name represents the center of the gang's territory. The gang is most known for Murder.

== Rivalry ==
The gang's main rivals include the nearby Toonerville Rifa 13, Elmwood st 13, Avenues 13, Vanowen st Locos 13, Mara SalvaTrucha, North Hollywood Boyz 13. West Side Playboys 13, Burbank 13

== Graffiti ==
The gang's use of graffiti is evident with symbols like "WSLS", "LSX3", or simply "WS Locos", "LOKOS" is commonly used.

== Allies ==
The Westside Locos gang is part of a larger Locos 13 alliance gang located throughout Los Angeles County. This alliance includes the CV Locos of Compton est 1979, as well as the Westside Locos of West La est 1978. The gang also has a subset in Simi Valley est 1993 It historically had other street clicks in Glendale such as justin street locos, Western Ave Little Locas, Flower Park Rifa, Salem st Cholos, and other clicks they used to have everywhere in Los Angeles.
