= Sons of Samoa =

Crips-affiliated gang from Long Beach, California

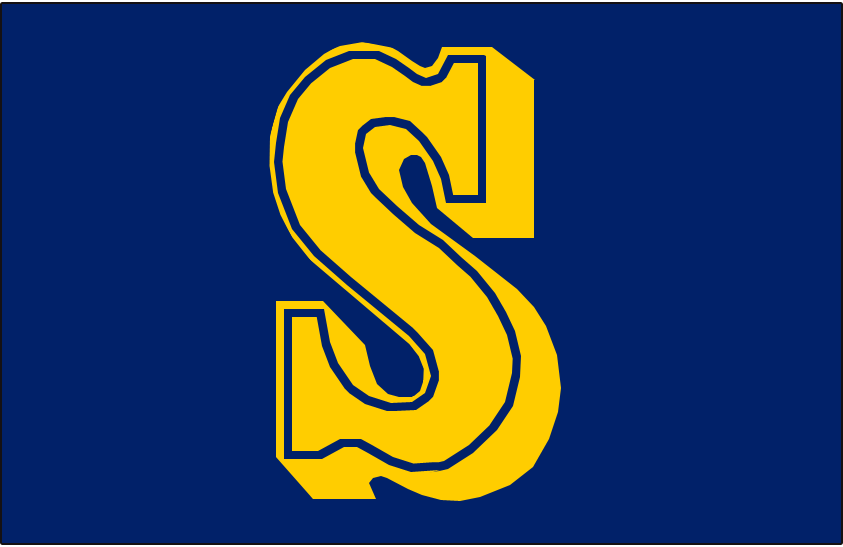
- Seattle Mariners baseball team logo used as Sons of Samoa symbol
- Founding location: Long Beach, California, U.S.
- Territory: United States (Alaska, California, Missouri, Utah, Washington)
- Ethnicity: Predominantly of Samoan descent
- Criminal activities: Drug trafficking, robbery, burglary, extortion
- Rivals: P.V.C. (Park Village Crip)

Sons of Samoa is a Crips-affiliated street gang based in Long Beach, California, United States. Its membership mainly consists of Samoan Americans with other Pacific Islander members.

== History ==
The Sons of Samoa gang is a faction of the Crips gang based in west Long Beach, California.

In 1985, the Sons of Samoa gang had about 200 members scattered throughout Long Beach, many of whom were Samoan immigrants or first-generation Samoans.

In the late 1980s, it was the focus of a Long Beach Police Department sweep after gang members had attacked two police officers. Around the same time, they were in a gang war with a gang from Garden Grove.

In 2015, an investigation led to new charges and the arrest of a Sons of Samoa member for a murder in 1996.

Three SOS members were arrested on March 16, 2021, for the February 9 fatal shooting of a man during late hours on the street near a church in San Jose, California. The victim was not known to have had any connection with the suspects.

== Activities ==
In the 1980s, the Sons of Samoa were heavily involved with the sale and use of cocaine and PCP, as well as robbery, burglary, and extortion. In the 1990s, the Suicidals subset of the Sons of Samoa sold drugs in alleyways. A 2011 report from the FBI listed Alaska, California, Missouri, Utah, and Washington as states where the Sons of Samoa operated.
