= Vineland Boys =

Mexican-American street gang

Vineland Boys is a street gang composed mainly of Hispanic Americans operating in the San Fernando Valley area of Los Angeles, United States.

== History ==
The Vineland Boys gang was founded in Sun Valley, Los Angeles in January 1988 by former members and associates of the 18th Street gang. It was named after Vineland Avenue in North Hollywood where members would play football. In addition to 18th Street, the Vineland Boys also clashed with the Mexican Mafia until the gang's founder Teddy Lopez y Alberto Ruiz was murdered by Mexican Mafia members at a Monterey Park nightclub in 1998. The Vineland boys have since joined the Mexican Mafia-controlled Sureño gang coalition. The gang has approximately 300 members and operates in the San Fernando Valley. The Vineland Boys have formed alliances with Armenian Power and the Abergil crime family. The gang allegedly first teamed up with Abergils in 2000, offering protection and cooperation to the Israeli mafia's ecstasy trafficking ring operating in their territory.

In 2003, members of the Vineland Boyz gang fatally shot Burbank Police Officer Matthew Pavelka. This prompted a massive response where 1,300 federal and local law enforcement members took part in "Operation Silent Night". It resulted in 23 arrests of Vineland Boyz gang members. This case became notorious not only for the long-scale US-Mexico manhunt of Matthew Pavelka's killer, David Garcia (who was a member of the Vineland Boys before his arrest in 2003) but also for revealing the Vineland Boys' ties to the Sinaloa Cartel, Mexico's largest drug cartel and one of the most violent criminal organizations in the world, as well as revealing the intricate and deep corruption in the city of Burbank with the arrest of former Burbank mayor Stacey Jo Murphy.

On February 13, 2019 the Vineland Boyz gang was targeted again by federal agents. Over three dozen associates were arrested in the raids.
