= Sureños =

Coalition of Mexican-American street gangs

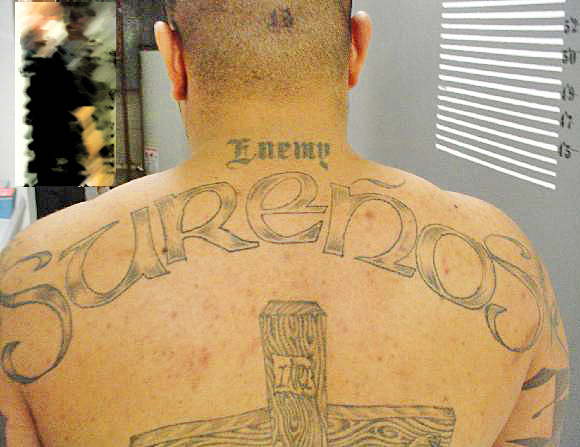
- Sureños tattoo
- Founded: 1967; 59 years ago
- Founding location: Southern California, United States
- Years active: 1967–present
- Territory: 35 U.S. states
- Ethnicity: Mexican American
- Activities: Drug trafficking, arms trafficking, human trafficking, extortion, robbery, auto theft, fraud, identity theft, homicide, assault
- Allies: 18th Street gang; Armenian Power; Aryan Brotherhood; Avenues; El Monte Flores; Familia 27; Florencia 13; Forming Kaos; Gulf Cartel; Mexican Mafia; Mongols; Ontario Varrio Sur; Playboys; Puente 13; Santa Monica 13; Toonerville Rifa 13; Vineland Boys; White Fence; Temple Street (gang)
- Rivals: Bloods; Latin Kings; Norteños; Nuestra Familia; Tiny Rascal Gang
- Notable members: Ruben Cavazos; David Barron Corona; Santiago Villalba Mederos; Timothy Joseph McGhee; Luis J. Rodriguez; Joe Saenz

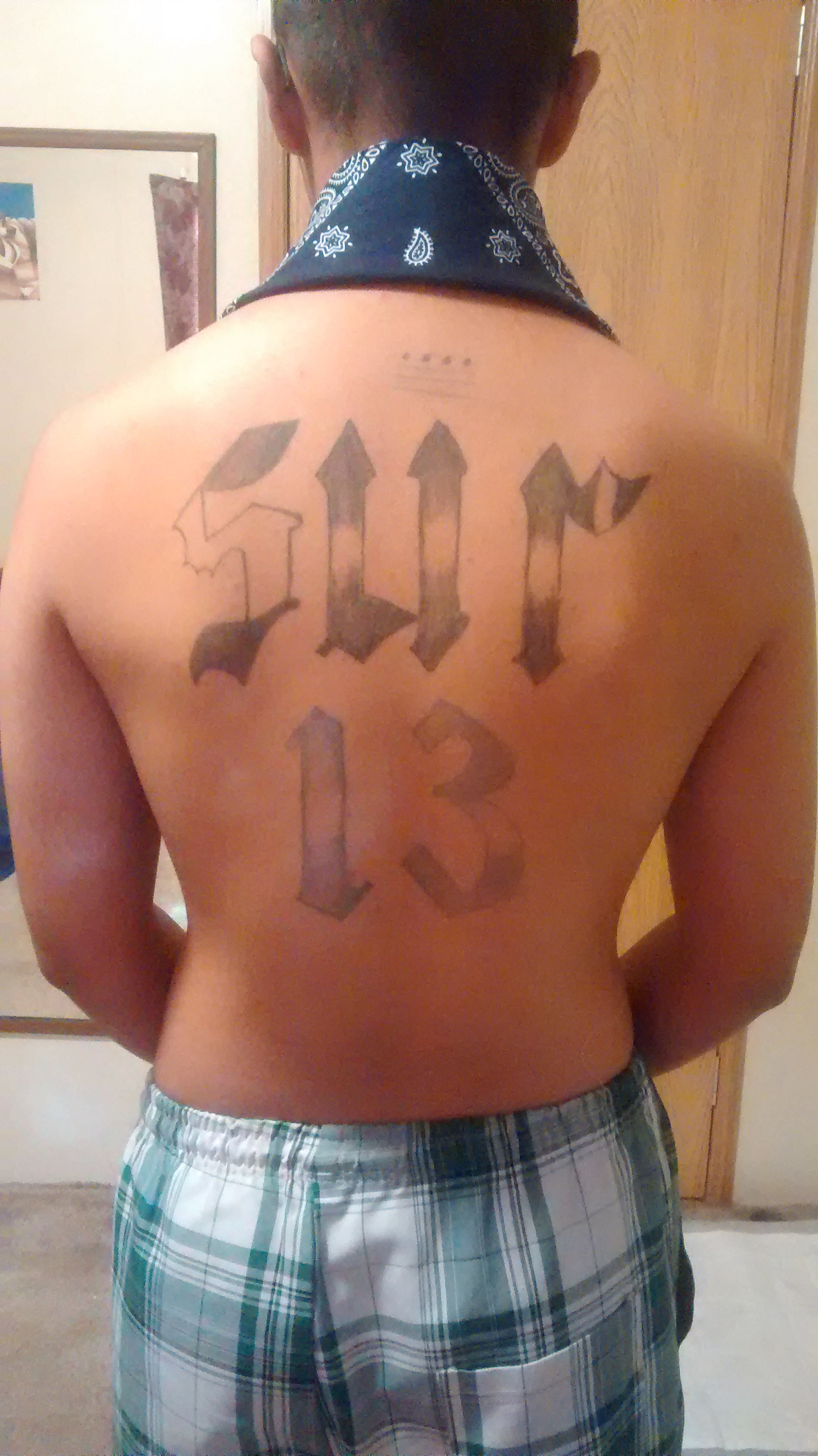
A Sureño gang member

Sureños ([suˈɾe.ɲos]; Spanish for Southerners)‍, also known as Southern United Raza, Sur 13 or Sureños X3, are groups of loosely affiliated gangs that pay tribute to the Mexican Mafia (a US-based prison gang) while in U.S. state and federal correctional facilities. Many Sureño gangs have rivalries with one another, and the only time this rivalry is set aside is when they enter the prison system. Thus, fighting is common among different Sureño gangs even though they share a common identity. Sureños have emerged as a national gang in the United States.

== History ==
Mexican American street gangs originated in Los Angeles in the early 1900s as a result of various factors, including economic conditions and racial prejudice. In 1957, the Mexican Mafia (or La Eme), California's first prison gang, was established by Luis "Huerro Buff" Flores and other East Los Angeles gang members, at the Deuel Vocational Institution. The Mexican Mafia was formed, in part, for protection from other groups in the prison population, and recruited its members from Mexican American street gangs. A rivalry subsequently developed between Mexican American inmates from Southern California and those from Northern California. The Southern gang members viewed Mexican Americans from rural, agricultural areas in Northern California with contempt and considered them to be unsophisticated and weak, while the Northerners considered those from Southern California to be overly Americanized. By 1967, La Eme was attempting to unify all Mexican American gangs in California, and a concerted effort was made to end rivalries between various groups and amalgamate them into the state's largest prison gang. However, the rivalry between Northerners and Southerners was solidified by an incident in which a Mexican Mafia member in San Quentin State Prison fatally stabbed his cellmate—a Mexican American from Northern California—in a dispute over a pair of shoes. The Northerners then formed the Nuestra Familia (NF) prison gang for protection from the Mexican Mafia, the Southern gang.

To distinguish themselves from the agricultural workers from Northern California, Mexican Mafia (La Eme) members began to refer to the gang members who worked for them as Sureños, a Spanish term meaning "Southerners". Inmates from Northern California who were affiliated with the Nuestra Familia became known as Norteños, or "Northerners". Although Sureños were established in 1968, the term was not used until the 1970s as a result of the continued conflict between the Mexican Mafia and the Nuestra Familia in California's prison system. When a Sureño is asked what being a Sureño means, members answer: "A Sureño is a foot soldier for the Mexican Mafia." As a result of these prison wars, all Hispanic California street gangs align themselves with the Sureño or Norteño movements with very few exceptions (such as the Fresno Bulldogs, and the Maravilla gangs of East Los Angeles). Due to its membership size, the Fresno Bulldogs is the only Hispanic gang in the California Department of Corrections and Rehabilitation that is able to remain independent.

== Description ==
=== Territory ===
The Sureño's main stronghold is in southern California. They have a heavy presence in California, Colorado, Nevada, Arizona, Texas, New Mexico and Utah. They have a smaller presence in Illinois, Oklahoma, Georgia, Oregon and Washington, and some have spread as far east as New York. Sureños have been documented in the U.S. military, found in both U.S. and overseas bases. They also can be found in some parts of Mexico. Sureños also maintain relationships with various drug trafficking organizations based in Mexico. They have been confirmed in 35 different states in the U.S. They are with the Gulf Cartel.

The statewide north–south dividing line between Norteños and Sureños has roughly been accepted as the cities of Bakersfield and Delano. Sureños' strongholds in Upstate California are usually in Santa Rosa and Modesto due to a high Mexican immigrant population in those cities. Sureños in Los Angeles refer to their members in Central California as "Central Sureños" and Sureños refer to their members in northern California as "Upstate Sureños".

=== Etymology and characteristics ===
While sur is the Spanish word for south, among Sureños "SUR" also stands for Southern United Raza. Sureños use the number 13—which represents the letter "M", the thirteenth letter of the alphabet—in order to mark their allegiance to the Mexican Mafia. Common Sureño gang markings and/or tattoos include (but are not limited to): SUR, XIII, X3, 13, Sur13, Uno Tres, Trece and three dots arranged like those on a game die. Although there are many tattoos used by Sureños, there is only one tattoo that proves or validates membership. The X3 tag can also be commonly spotted in graffiti. The word Sureño or Sureña must be earned. Most Sureños are of Mexican descent, but some Sureño gangs allow members from various other ethnic backgrounds to join their ranks, making Sureños multiethnic. They also favor blue or grey sport clothing, such as Los Angeles Dodgers, Los Angeles Rams and sometimes Los Angeles Lakers. Upstate Sureños, however, wear Dallas Cowboys, San Jose Sharks and Oakland Raiders clothing.

== Criminal activity ==
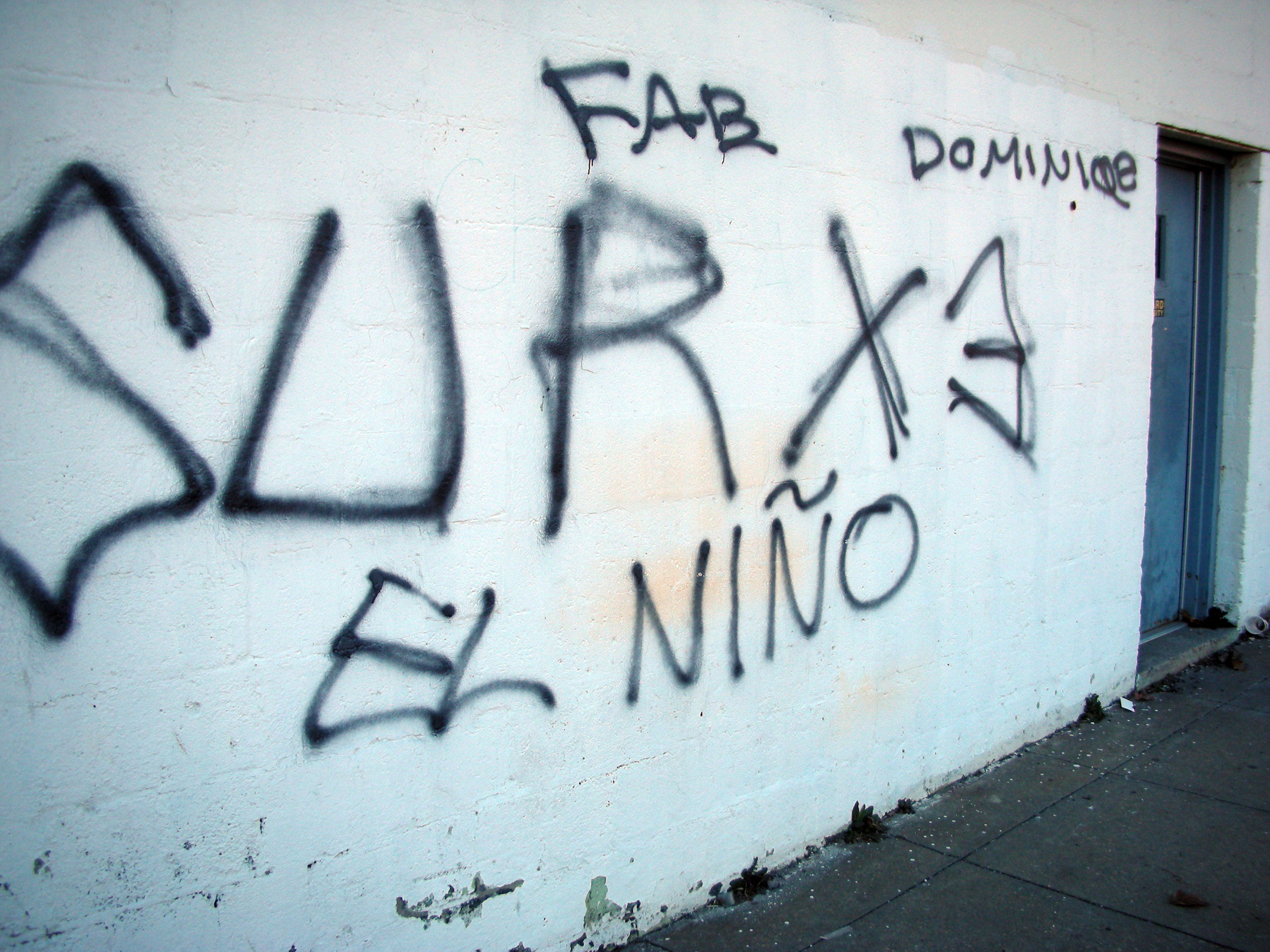
Graffiti, also known as tagging, is used to mark a specific set's territory

Sureño groups are involved in many aspects of criminal activity including homicide, drug trafficking, kidnapping, assaults, carjackings, home invasions, and robbery. They are also heavily engaged in human trafficking of adults and children. The primary sources of income for Sureño gang members are the retail-level distribution of cocaine, heroin, marijuana, and methamphetamine, both within prison systems and in the community, and the extortion of drug dealers. Sureño members may also have direct associations with Mexican drug cartels, and broker deals on behalf of the Mexican Mafia and their own gangs.

There have been many high-profile criminal cases involving Sureños in a variety of states. Police departments have a difficult time dealing with this gang because of its decentralized hierarchy at the street level. Law enforcement attempts to limit the influence of the Mexican Mafia over the various Sureño street gangs have been met with little success. By the late 1990s, a federal task force was set up in order to investigate the gang's involvement in the illegal drug trade; this resulted in the arrest of several of its members. The authorities confiscated thousands of dollars in drugs and money, as reported by the Los Angeles Times and local news channels. The group has historically quarreled with various rival gangs for placement and competition, which has resulted in many drive-by shootings and deaths. On August 24, 2004, a law enforcement preliminary injunction terminated the active members of the 38th Street gang, out of the streets, banning them from using firearms, alcohol, graffiti and other dangerous materials in public.

Sureños have a stronghold in San Francisco's Mission District, who feud with fellow Sureño factions and Norteños. Sureños have had a history of beefing with other Sureño individuals, whether it be gang in-fighting, or different Sureño cliques fighting each other. For instance, two rival Sureño gangs fighting over territorial grounds of Southwest Community Park in Santa Rosa, California, lead to the shooting death of an 18-year-old man in 2008. The neighborhood South Park is home to a portion of the city's Angelo Heights Sureños, named after the Angelino Heights neighborhood in Los Angeles in which its original members came from. Sureños also have had territorial fighting in San Jose and Oakland.

In 2009, members of the Sureños were charged in the deaths of rival Norteño gang members Alvaro Garcia-Pena and Intiaz Ahmed, who were killed at Alvarado's Bar & Grill in Richmond, California. One member of the Sureños pleaded guilty and was sentenced to 25 years in prison. Other members from the Sureños gang received other sentences for their involvement in the shooting.

In 2010, 51 Sureños were arrested in a California narcotics sting. The investigation identified eight Sureño gangs involved in various criminal activities, including the distribution of narcotics. The investigation also resulted in the seizure of more than 19 pounds of methamphetamine, a methamphetamine conversion laboratory, 1.5 kilograms of cocaine, small amounts of crack cocaine, 25 pounds of marijuana, 35 firearms, and $800,000 in currency and property. The charges against the gang members were conspiracy to distribute methamphetamine, cocaine and marijuana, street terrorism and firearms violations.
