= Fanny Edel Falk Laboratory School =

Coordinates: 40.4470°N 79.9597°W

- 4060 Allequippa Street; Pittsburgh, PA 15261; United States

Information
- Type: Private
- Established: 1931
- Principal: Jill Sarada, Ed. D.
- Grades: K–8
- Website: Falk School

The Fanny Edel Falk Laboratory School, or simply the Falk School, is a private kindergarten through eighth grade laboratory school of the University of Pittsburgh. It is located on the University of Pittsburgh's upper campus on Allequippa St.

== Charter ==
Falk Laboratory School was established in 1930 under a charter agreement between the University of Pittsburgh and benefactors Leon Falk Jr. and his sister, Marjorie Falk Levy. The school was named in honor of Leon and Marjorie's mother, Fanny Edel Falk. It features progressive, experiential, and inquiry-based instruction and develops and refines its own curriculum.

Originally chartered as a progressive experimental school for demonstration purposes, Falk School's charter was amended in 1946 to include the mentoring and observation of practice teachers as one of the school's functions. It is the only known laboratory school in existence to have a legal charter that stipulates its purposes and functions. Over the years the faculty added to the school's original functions to incorporate educational research and to integrate new educational practices as they are developed. Teachers are in charge of, and responsible for, developing their own curricula and programs.

== History ==
Progressive laboratory child education at the University of Pittsburgh was established when a laboratory school for children four to seven years old was opened by the School of Education on October 6, 1913. The original school grew into two schools, collectively known as the University Demonstration Schools, composed of the School of Childhood, for children up to second grade, and the Elementary School for grades three, four, and five. Following a reorganization within the School of Education, the University Demonstration Schools became independent and continued as a private project known as the Community School until the establishment of the Falk School in 1931, at which time it reabsorbed the Community School.

The Falk School opened on September 14, 1931 with 78 enrolled children, a principal, seven full-time teachers, and a part-time teacher from the Department of Physical Education. The school at first was placed in temporary quarters in the Stephens house of the university until its own dedicated facility opened a few weeks later. Martin P. Chworowsky served as its original director. The Falk School facility had an original capacity for 155 children and included a nursery, kindergarten, and classrooms for first through sixth grades. It originally admitted children from two and one-half to twelve years of age. A health program was directed by the Women's Medical Adviser of the University of Pittsburgh. The three lower grades had sessions between 9 am and noon, while the upper grades met from 9 am to 3:15 pm.

By the end of Falk School's sixth year, it expanded to eight grades with full training for high school. Ongoing expansion and renovations allowed for a planned increase in enrollment from 275 students in 2008 to 429 in 2018.

Tuition for Falk School was originally $200 a year for lower grades and $275 a year for upper grades. Current tuition for 2018-2019 is $15,370 per year, for all grade levels K-8.

== Building ==
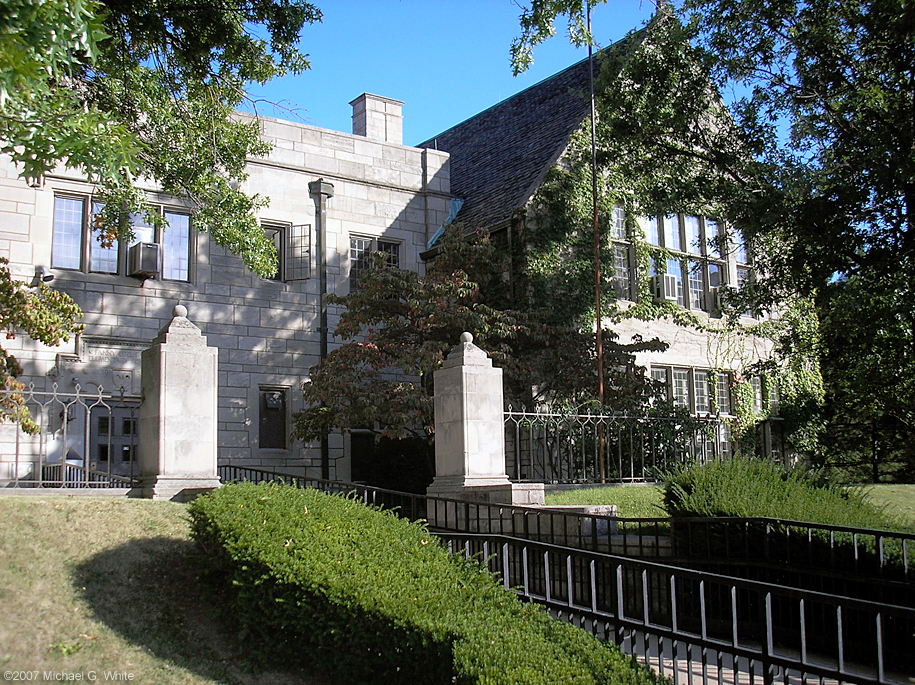
The Falk Laboratory School at the University of Pittsburgh was built in 1931.

A Tudor-style gray stone school house with Old English slate shingle roof, the Falk School building was designed by Janssen and Cocken and built in 1931 at an original cost of $200,000. The cornerstone of Falk School was laid in August, 1931 and contains, among other papers, a speech read by Majorie Falk Levy in which she described the life and charter of her mother, and the school's namesake, Fanny Edel Falk. The building was designed to initially accommodate 155 students in its eight classrooms.

Expansion of the Falk School, from the 28,000-square-foot (2,600 m^{2}) facility to a 65,000-square-foot (6,000 m^{2}) facility occurred in 2008 and renovations of the original building were completed in 2009. The $21.1 million expansion and renovations, designed by architectural firm Perkins Eastman, features several green building components and will allow for increased enrollment of up to 403 students by 2012. The new 38,000-square-foot (3,500 m^{2}) academic wing for the school includes 14 classrooms for Kindergarten through eighth grade, a new computer classroom (now has been transformed into the "WonderLab".), art room, library, cafeteria, science room, and support areas. The outdoor play area was relocated to the west side of the building and a new play area was constructed on the gym roof. The front facade of the new addition is designed to match the stone finish of the old building with a circular drive. The back of the building has a more modern look with red siding and two walls of windows that enclose the expanded cafeteria and library space. The back also has two outdoor terraces and a sidewalk .

Preceded by Cathedral of Learning	University of Pittsburgh buildings Falk School; Constructed: 1931	Succeeded by Heinz Memorial Chapel

== Administration ==
The head of school (director) of Falk Laboratory School is a member of the executive committee in the University of Pittsburgh's School of Education and the chair of the Falk School Board is the School of Education's dean. Falk School teachers are faculty in the University of Pittsburgh's School of Education, and the director holds the rank of associate professor at the university. Falk is a teacher-training site for education students at the University of Pittsburgh, with as many as 30 Master of Arts in Teaching candidates apprenticing at Falk each year.

== Notable alumni ==
Notable alumni include.

- Monte Buchsbaum —neuropsychiatrist and son of author and invertebrate biologist Ralph Buchsbaum
- David Greene — American journalist and one of the co-hosts of Morning Edition on National Public Radio.
- Patti Deutsch — comedic television actress and voice-over artist who worked on Rowan & Martin's Laugh-In and the 1970s game show Match Game.
- Alec Karakatsanis - American civil rights lawyer, social justice advocate, recent recipient of the Stephen B. Bright Award by Gideon's Promise and the Trial Lawyer of the Year Award by Public Justice, co-founder of Equal Justice Under Law, and founder and Executive Director of Civil Rights Corps, a Washington D.C. impact litigation nonprofit
- Lorin Maazel — conductor, violinist and composer
- Rob Marshall — Broadway choreographer and director of the movies Into the Woods, Chicago, Memoirs of a Geisha, and Mary Poppins Returns
- Kathleen Marshall — choreographer and Broadway director. Broadway credits include: Damn Yankees (director, 2017), In Transit (director and choreographer, 2016), Anything Goes (choreographer, 2011) and The Pajama Game (director and choreographer, 2006)
- Fritz Weaver — Tony Award winning stage, screen and television actor
