= Run Chhoun =

American gang member (born 1972)

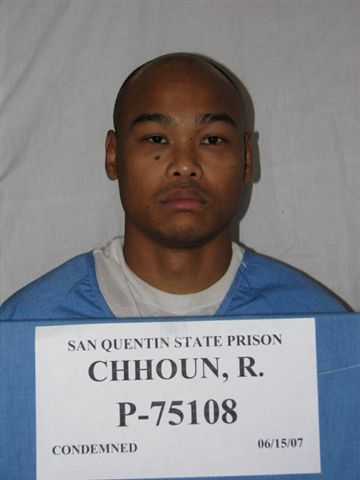
- Mugshot of Chhoun, taken on June 15, 2007
- Born: Run Chhuon; December 1, 1972 (age 53); Battambang province, Khmer Republic
- Motive: Robbery; Gang warfare
- Convictions: First degree murder with special circumstances (9 counts); Robbery (4 counts); Burglary (2 counts); Attempted murder
- Penalty: Death

Details
- Victims: 9 convicted, 2 more suspected
- Span of crimes: July 27, 1995 – August 9, 1995
- Country: United States
- State: California
- Locations: Sacramento County, San Bernardino County, Los Angeles County

Run "Peter" Chhoun (Khmer: ឈួន រ៉ន; born December 1, 1972) is a Cambodian gang leader of the Tiny Rascal Gang convicted for involvement in nine murders committed in the US state of California between July and August 1995 alongside multiple accomplices. His co-defendant in most of the crimes, fellow TRG leader Samreth Pan, was also sentenced to death for four of the murders while five other accomplices received lengthy prison sentences.

== Early life ==
Chhoun was born in a village of Battambang province to Buddhist rice farmers Marith Chhuon and Sophat Chiet. During the Cambodian Civil War, his father was conscripted into the Khmer Republic's military to fight the Communist Party of Kampuchea. Shortly after Chhoun's birth, he and his mother traveled to Angkor Borei to visit his father during his deployment there, where the family were caught in the middle of a shooting and bombing attack.

Around 1976, when Chhoun was between four and five years old, his home village was taken over by Khmer Rouge forces and after hiding in a cave beneath of Buddhist temple for several days without food or water, the family was captured. Chhoun and his older brother, Chhum Bili Chhuon, were separated from their father, who was taken away on a death march, imprisoned and tortured, and initially remained with their mother. Khmer Rouge discouraged displays of affection between the Chhoun brothers and their mother, once preventing her from comforting Chhoun after he was rescued from a near drowning. The brothers were eventually sent off to a labor camp, which had no bedding except hay, with nutrition consisting solely of rice water. According to Chhoun's brother, they were forced to dig graves and bury women and other children murdered in the killing fields by the Khmer Rouge in exchange for food and water. When Chhoun was seven years old, the brothers personally witnessed the execution of two people by soldiers.

The brothers made two escape attempts in order to see their parents again. During the first attempt, both boys were captured by the Kampuchea Revolutionary Army, with Bili being hit in the head with a shovel by a soldier before the pair were forced to sit in an outdoor area of the camp without moving for six days, receiving no food and kept alive with water shared by other children. The brothers managed to flee the camp on their second attempt and returned to their home village to their mother, where they were joined shortly after by their father, who had been released after several months of detention. By this point, Chhoun's two sisters and all four of his grandparents had died. Chhoun had developed a fever and was described as having been heavily beaten during his escape, complaining of constant headaches while back at the family farm, regularly banging his head against walls to alleviate the pain. Chhoun, his older brother, and his father were eventually rearrested and held at the same camp, but kept imprisoned away from each other.

In 1979, Chhoun and his brother were able to leave the camp due to the Vietnamese invasion of Cambodia and during monsoon season of that year, they fled to Thailand on foot over the course of three days, during which time they saw several dead bodies and witnessed a family of fellow refugees die in a land mine explosion. They were reunited with their parents at a refugee camp and while in Thailand, Chhoun contracted tuberculosis and was regularly malnourished, often running away from the camp to hunt rats and rabbits, scavenge in garbage, or beg for food.

The Chhoun family immigrated to the United States in 1981 after being sponsored by a Catholic priest, first settling in Mobile, Alabama, working at a seafood processing facility outside the city and living in a predominantly Black housing complex. Although the family romanized their surname as Chhuon, the name was commonly rendered "Chhoun" for most of Run Chhoun's life in the US. The family remained poor, with his parents developing an alcohol problem, and were subject to racial abuse. Chhoun reportedly continued to experience headaches and his habit of banging his head against walls. He regularly ran away from home, sleeping overnight in dumpsters and foraging for food from orchards or wild bushes on his way to school. His later defense argued that Chhoun was raised in a neighborhood with frequent gang-related shootings and that he never learned fluent English. Chhoun and his two brothers were judged as educably mentally retarded and attended special education classes.

In 1985, the family moved to California, first living in Stockton, where the alcoholism of both parents worsened and resulted in physical abuse of their sons, while Chhoun began abusing gasoline and glue as inhalant drugs. Shortly after, the family settled in Long Beach, where Chhoun was initiated into the Tiny Rascal Gang, for whom he engaged in car theft. He served time at California Youth Authority facilities, where he was noted for behavioral improvements attributed to the "highly-structured environment." Following his release in 1993, Chhoun married Champa Onkhamdy, who encouraged him to leave the TRG and in 1994, the couple moved to Portland, Oregon, where Chhoun was set to begin janitorial school.

In June 1995, while his wife was pregnant with their son, Chhoun was informed that his younger brother, Em Chhuon, had been shot and injured in San Bernardino. Although Onkhamdy tried to dissuade her husband from returning to California out of concern he would again associate with the Tiny Rascal Gang, he drove to San Bernardino after promising to return after visiting his brother. Shortly after crossing state borders, Chhoun was arrested by California authorities on an old traffic warrant, but released shortly after. This incident angered Chhoun and motivated him to return to the TRG, later telling court psychiatrist William Sack, that his "world caved in" and he felt "it is no use anymore; I'll never make it; I'll never be able to make a good life for myself; I've given up." Prosecutors noted that Chhoun was the only member of his family to become involved in gang crime.

== Summary of crimes ==
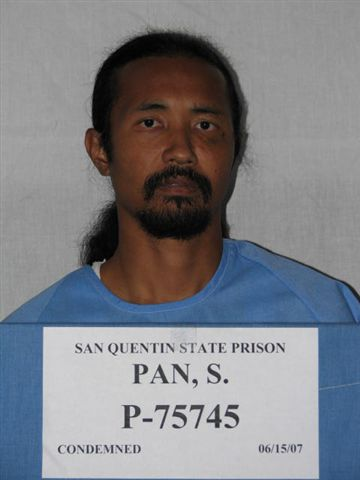
Samreth Pan

From July 10 to August 9, 1995, 22-year-old Run Chhoun (also known as "Chaka"), 18-year-old Samreth Pan ("Rusty"), and various fellow Tiny Rascal Gang members carried out eleven murders in three different counties in California as well as Washington state, all of which were committed using firearms. All the victims in the home invasions were Vietnamese immigrants, though the first four victims were mistakenly identified as Hmong initially.

=== Home invasions ===
On July 10, 1995, Chhoun and 21-year-old Giao Ly ("Sandman") robbed the apartment of 26-year-old Johnny Hagan Jr. (also known as Le Sang) and 23-year-old Hong Nga Thi Pham in Spokane. The robbers tied up Hagan and Pham and pushed them to the floor, where the couple were cut with a knife after they refused to hand over any valuables. Chhoun killed the couple by shooting Hagan twice in the head and Pham in the head and chest using a .45 caliber handgun. The couple's children, four-year-old Johnny "Joe" Hagan III and one-year-old Diana Hagan, saw the robbers and witnessed his parents being tortured with the knife before hiding in his room with his sister. Chhoun and Ly left with $4,000 and some jewelry. According to Ly, he had left the gang and attempted to live in hiding in Washington before Chhoun located him and coerced Ly into becoming an accomplice by threatening his family with death. His presence was confirmed by fingerprints on the front door and a bloody handprint on a cabinet. Joe alerted neighbors the following morning and later identified Chhoun as the shooter.

According Chhoun's wife Champa Onkhamdy, she, Chhoun, Ly, and 15-year-old Kunthea Sar ("Precious") had driven to Spokane together, but she and Sar stayed at an apartment while Chhoun and Ly carried out the robbery. After they returned, Chhoun and Ly hid out at Onkhamdy's home in Portland, where the two gave part of the loot to Sar and two other TRG associates. She initially claimed to have overheard the group mentioning murder, but later stated that she could not understand the conversation since she was not a speaker of Khmer. Chhoun gave Onkhamdy some of the stolen jewelry before he returned to California via plane.

On July 27, Chhoun, Pan, and a 16-year-old newcomer TRG member, William Evans ("C.J."), robbed the apartment store of Hung Diue Le and Quyen Luu in Florin. The gang's getaway driver, 16-year-old Bunjun Chhinkhathork ("Puppet"), had pointed the couple out as targets. After Chhinkhathork, accompanied either by Pan or Evans, visited the apartment and bought candy to scope out the location, Chhoun, Pan, and Evans, approached the entrance of the building and attempted to take the couple's daughter, 17-year-old Amie Le, as a hostage at gunpoint. Amie ran off and hid in a neighbor's apartment, where her brother and sister were visiting a friend, warning her mother of the robbers along the way. Accompanied by either Pan or Evans, Chhoun, wielding a 9mm Glock pistol, entered the Le apartment and fought with Quyen Luu, who was shot in the leg. Chhoun was then attacked with a chair by Luu's father-in-law Nghiep Thich Le, who was shot in the arm and head. Chhoun also killed Hung Diue Le with a gunshot to the chest. The gang fled the scene with no money in a blue Honda Accord, registered to Pan's adoptive mother. In interviews with police, Quyen Luu misidentified the two intruders as Hispanic and she was later unable to recognize Chhoun or others involved in court.

=== Drive-by shootings ===
On August 6, Chhoun was the driver of a brown Toyota Celica, owned by Chhoun's younger brother, carrying Pan, Evans, Thavy Pay, and Phirom Thack, driving around Muscoy in search of a rival Oriental Boys gang member known as "Bones", who had fired several gunshots outside of the home of Pan's mother. The group followed the vehicle of Bunlort Bun, who was transporting two people, including a different member of the Oriental Boys, as passengers. After Bun dropped the two men off, the gang engaged Bun in a car chase, which ended when Bun's car was shot and rolled to a stop in San Bernardino. Chhoun drove up to the driver's side of the vehicle and shot Bun three times, which was followed by three additional gunshots by Pan at Chhoun's instruction. Evans also fired gunshots, but they did not strike Bun. In total, 32 gunshots were fired. Chhoun later bragged about the murder, unaware that Bun was not "Bones". Chhoun twice directed several other TRG members and associates to check back on the crime scene as proof of the murder, and when they confirmed the presence of police and an ambulance upon their second return, Chhoun and Pan celebrated about killing a rival gang member. A forensic examination determined that both shooters used 9mm pistols and that Pan's gunshots caused Bun's death.

On August 8, Chhoun drove the Toyota, containing Pan, Sar, and a 14-year-old girl known as "D.T.", in Pomona. The group drove up to two Mexican men, Rodolfo Huerta and Miguel Vargas Avina, who were preparing to drive off in Huerta's Ford pick-up truck to go rabbit hunting. Pan instructed the passengers in the back to duck before at least ten gunshots were fired at the pick-up truck from the Toyota's front seat side window, fired either by Chhoun, Pan, or both men, using the same guns as the previous shooting. Avina, seated on the passenger side of the pick-up truck, was killed by a single gunshot to the chest while the driver Huerta was unharmed. Huerta was unable to identify the occupants of the Toyota and initially described the shooters as "Oriental or Fillipino" before stating on six occasions with police that the shooters were Black, based on the skin tone of an arm he saw aiming at his truck. Avina had been carrying a hunting rifle, which he was not aiming. Chhoun and Pan later claimed that they had mistaken Avina for a member of the Pomona 12th Street Gang. Upon returning from the drive, Sar told other TRG members that the group had shot Avina for "throwing up [a] sign".

=== South Elm Avenue killings ===
On August 9, Chhoun, Evans, and another new member, 16-year-old Vinh Quang Tran ("Scrappy"), robbed the Nguyen family in San Bernardino. Chhoun borrowed a second gun to arm Vinh Tran from Pan, who declined to participate. The gang was accompanied by 19-year-old Nhung Thi Tran ("Karol"; no relation to Vinh Tran), a friend of the Nguyens who had suggested them as targets, though she later stated that she was under the belief the family would only be robbed. In the evening, she knocked on the residence's front door while the gang hid in some bushes and after the father, Henry Nguyen, opened the door, Vinh Tran forced his way inside at gunpoint, followed by Chhoun and Evans, while Nhung Tran returned to the getaway vehicle. After first taking Henry Nguyen, his wife Trinh Tran, and their 13-year-old daughter Doan Nguyen hostage, Vinh Tran brought three other children, 11-year-old Daniel Nguyen, 10-year-old David Nguyen, and 2-year-old Dennis Tran, into the living room, forcing all six to the ground. Since the Nguyens spoke no English, Vinh Tran translated for Chhoun, who demanded money and threatened their youngest child Dennis with a meat cleaver when Henry Nguyen claimed that they had no money; Henry ultimately relinquished $2,000 (equivalent to $4,226 in 2025) in cash. Vinh Tran forced toothpaste into Trinh Tran's nostrils, claiming it was poison as a threat. Evans searched the house for valuables and returned to the living room after Daniel agreed to lead him to a stash of money in the boy's bedroom.

Just after Daniel went to his room, before Evans could follow, Chhoun or Vinh Tran killed Henry Nguyen, shooting him once in the back of the head and a second time in the chest once he was on the ground. Four superficial cuts from a knife were also found on his nape. Evans returned to investigate the noise, leaving Daniel behind and upon finding the scene in the living room, Chhoun and Vinh Tran told Evans to leave. Over the course of fifteen minutes, Trinh Tran, Doan, Daniel, and David were killed inside the house, all of them having been shot multiple times in the head, chest, and legs. Dennis survived with a gunshot to the hand and informed his paternal aunt when she called twelve hours after the murders, telling her "Mommy's dead". The mother of Nhung Tran arrived to check on the family and found the bodies of Henry, Trinh and David dead in the living room, along with Dennis, who was holding his brother's hand and crying. Another neighbor discovered the bodies of Doan and Daniel in a bedroom. Chhoun later claimed that Vinh Tran "went crazy and shot a kid" and that both of them had killed the rest of the family. Vinh Tran himself stated that while Chhoun killed Henry Nguyen, Vinh Tran had acted alone in killing Trinh and her three children.

At their hideout, Chhoun divided a portion of the stolen money to his three accomplices: Nhung Tran received $500 (equivalent to $1,056 in 2025), Vinh Tran received around $200 (equivalent to $423 in 2025), and Evans received $100 (equivalent to $211 in 2025). Additionally, Kunthea Sar was first offered $100, which she turned down, before accepting $20 each from Chhoun and Vinh Tran, although Sar later stated she was not told of the money's origin and only made the connection to the Nguyen family murders after hearing about the crime in the news. Afterwards, the group went to a pool hall. Vinh Tran noted that Chhoun had "acted oddly" on the drive back and "was not connecting with anyone else".

=== Arrest ===
Chhoun, Evans, and Vinh Tran drove to Seattle, where they borrowed money from Chhoun's wife, leaving a necklace belonging to victim Trinh Tran as collateral. On August 16, Chhoun was arrested in North Highlands alongside Evans after the Sacramento County Sheriff's Office found bullets and shell casings in their car during a traffic stop. Chhoun confessed to involvement in the murder of Nghiep Thich Le and Hung Diue Le in Sacramento, but claimed that Pan had been the one to enter the apartment and kill the victims. In inteviews with court psychologist William Foreman, Chhoun stated he only committed the robbery targeting the Nguyen family because accomplice Nhing Tran needed money for rent and that "he had no feelings when committing a crime but afterwards felt pain", crying when seeing pictures of the dead children because he was reminded of his childhood and the Khmer Rouge, stating "the things I learned, experienced as a kid are still there". Chhoun was charged with two counts of murder, assault, robbery, and burglary.

Pan was arrested on September 1, after he attempted to rob two children in Signal Hill. During another interrogation on September 7, Chhoun claimed that he and Pan fled before they could rob the Le family after hearing someone else firing gunshots in the apartment. Pan separately claimed that he blacked out before the robbery and had no memory of the events that followed. Chhoun was linked to the Spokane murders that same September when his fingerprints were matched. Chhoun's cellmate during his jail custody in Sacramento told authorities that Chhoun presented the murders as a contract killing, saying he and accomplice Giao Ly were paid $10,000. On April 4, 1996, Ly was arrested in Hartford, Connecticut, and charged with aggravated first-degree murder. Chhoun was pending extradition to Washington on account of his charges in California. Pan was initially considered the main orchestrator behind the murders and several other suspected homicides linked to the TRG.

== Legal process ==
=== Victims ===
Chhoun was convicted of the following murders.

- Hung Diue Le (a.k.a. Heunt Luu), 47 - Sacramento, July 27, 1995
- Nghiep Thich Le (a.k.a. Letntip Luu), 73 - Sacramento, July 27, 1995 (father of Hung Diue Le)
- Bunlort Nhing Bun, 20 - San Bernardino, August 6, 1995
- Miguel Vargas Avina, 20 - Pomona, August 8, 1995
- Son "Henry" Nguyen, 44 - San Bernardino, August 9, 1995
- Trinh Yen Tran, 35 - San Bernardino, August 9, 1995 (wife of Henry Nguyen)
- Doan Hoang Nguyen, 13 - San Bernardino, August 9, 1995 (daughter of Henry Nguyen and Trinh Tran)
- Daniel Hoang Nguyen, 11 - San Bernardino, August 9, 1995 (son of Henry Nguyen)
- David Hoang Nguyen, 10 - San Bernardino, August 9, 1995 (son of Henry Nguyen)

=== Trials ===
The trials for the murders in California began on February 29, 1996. Besides Chhoun and Pan, also tried for involvement were Nhung Tran, Vinh Tran, and William Evans, the latter two of whom were tried as adults. During the murder trials, the traumatic childhoods of Chhoun and Pan were brought up as mitigating factors.

A CT scan of Chhoun showed brain asymmetry and unbalanced frontal lobe activity which indicated hypofrontality, consistent with traumatic brain injury or childhood post-traumatic stress disorder. Psychologist William Foreman diagnosed polysubstance dependence, primarily alcohol and marijuana, and further argued that Chhoun developed reactive attachment disorder and chronic posttraumatic stress disorder due his experience in the Cambodian genocide. He also considered an antisocial personality disorder, but attributed most of the associated symptoms displayed by Chhoun as "artifacts of survival strategies in Cambodia.", also noting that he further discounted ASPD because Chhoun voiced regret for killing the Nguyen children. Foreman did not perform psychological exams with Chhoun, citing his poor English skills. Psychiatrist Paul Leung also diagnosed PTSD. Child psychologist William Sack, who had previously treated child refugees of the Cambodian genocide, also diagnosed reactive attachment disorder, as well as conduct disorder, chronic depression, and cocaine dependence, and considered potential PTSD. Another psychologist, Craig Rath, denied Foreman's main diagnoses, instead stating that Chhoun's childhood symptoms were more consistent with conduct disorder, which continued to be present as antisocial personality disorder. Rath also noted that Chhoun's high school records and private writings showed a basic understanding of English.

Pan did not live through the genocide, as he was born in a refugee camp in Thailand, but his defense argued that Pan was affected by the poor living standard in the camp, having not received treatment for a head injury sustained there. After immigrating to the United States in 1980, Pan also had to take care of his mother, who had cancer, and he was severely affected by a 1985 car crash that killed his mother and left Pan in hospital care for several months. Pan was only informed of his mother's death three months later and following another head injury, he reportedly began having hallucinations. Pan had graduated Cajon High School and was attending Chaffey College at the time of the murders, living under the legal guardianship of Terry Hale, one of his high school teachers. Psychologist Veronica Thomas also diagnosed him with antisocial personality disorder, which was likely exacerbated by the death of his mother and repeated head injuries.

==== Accomplice convictions ====
In 1996, Bunjun Chhinkhathork was sentenced to a minimum of 20 years imprisonment for his involvement. In December 1996, Vinh Tran pleaded guilty to the murders of the Nguyen family in exchange for a 50 year to life sentence rather than life without parole. Nhung Tran initially pleaded not guilty, but she accepted a plea deal for a maximum sentence of 25 years to life imprisonment for five counts of first-degree murder, agreeing to testify against the remaining defendants. In January 1997, William Evans pleaded guilty in exchange for a maximum sentence of 37 years and 4 months imprisonment. Giao Ly was convicted in November 1996, having pled guilty to a lesser charge of first-degree murder to avoid life imprisonment, and sentenced to 42 years in January 1997.

==== Jail incidents ====
On May 7, 1996, while in jail custody, Chhoun threatened two officers of San Bernardino County Sheriff's Department, Deputy Brice Jury and Sergeant Daniel Braun, and the officers' families after Jury denied Chhoun release into a lower security section the prior day. Chhoun later brandished a shank at Jury through the bars of his cell and attempted to bite Jury when he and other officers entered to subdue him. Besides the shank, a makeshift ligature was also recovered. In 1998, Chhoun was heard discussing "a Karol or Carolyn" on the phone, telling the person on the other end that he had others looking for her as "without her, they didn’t have a case".

==== Chhoun and Pan convictions ====
On January 4, 2000, Chhoun was convicted of the Nguyen family murders, receiving a death sentence. On February 29, 2000, Chhoun and Pan were convicted of the murder of Bunlort Bun, which resulted in life imprisonment. On January 31, 2002, both were convicted of the murders of Hung Diue Le, Nghiep Thich Le, and Miguel Avina, with recommendations for the death penalty. In addition, Pan and Chhoun were also convicted of burglary and robbery as well as the attempted murder of Quyen Luu and Rodolfo Huerta. On March 12, they were sentenced to death. Since March 31, 2000, Chhoun has been incarcerated at San Quentin Rehabilitation Center.

Chhoun remained charged for his involvement in the murders of Johnny Hagan and Hong Pham in Spokane, with the case pending as of 2002.

=== Other suspected TRG crimes ===
During his first murder trial, Chhoun was also charged with execution-style killing of 14-year-old Trang Vu on July 28, 1995 in Redlands, but the charge was dropped before sentencing due to a lack of evidence. William Evans was initially considered the suspect in Vu's rape and murder. In 2001, Chhoun was also implicated in the rape of Tiny Rascal Gang associate "D.T.", who stated that Chhoun had raped her at knifepoint while at the house of Nhung Tran in summer 1995.

There was also research into potential links to the July 4 murder of married couple Im Suk An and Sung Sook An, and their 19-year-old son Chang An in Lynwood. The An family murders were the last of a larger, possibly connected series of murders (four shootings and one arson) between November 1994 and July 1995, with a total of ten deaths (seven Korean Americans and three non-Koreans). Investigations later focused on Chang An's criminal associates, though police still noted similarities to the Tiny Rascal Gang killings.

=== Later developments ===
In February 2021, the Supreme Court of California affirmed the death sentence of Chhoun. In 2024, Chhoun and Pan, alongside fellow death row inmates Anthony Bankston and Marcos Barrera, claimed that the circumstances of their convictions were in violation of the Racial Justice Act. Chhoun's defense claimed that he and his accomplices were judged by religious and ethnic stereotypes, saying that there were insinuations by both prosecutors and his defense that he did not live up to the model minority of Asian Americans stereotype and Buddhist values, and that prosecutors invoked Black stereotypes due to his skin tone. Chhoun's appeals also claimed that prosecutors had engaged in Cambodian genocide denial by instructing jury members to ignore portions of the documentary Year Zero: The Silent Death of Cambodia played by Chhoun's defense and questioning the provided historical details as "embellished", arguing that there was no proof that 25% of Cambodia's population was killed and stating there was the possibility that the starvation was not intentional but "simply because Cambodia was a very poor country". In July 2026, three of Samreth Pan's murder convictions along with the death sentence were overturned. Run Chhoun's convictions were upheld, after the Supreme Court of California found that statements during his sentencing relating to his Cambodian background and Buddhist upbringing to did not violate the Racial Justice Act in a 4-3 decision.

== See also ==
- Capital punishment in California
- List of death row inmates in the United States § California
