= 2020–2022 catalytic converter theft ring =

American organized criminal group

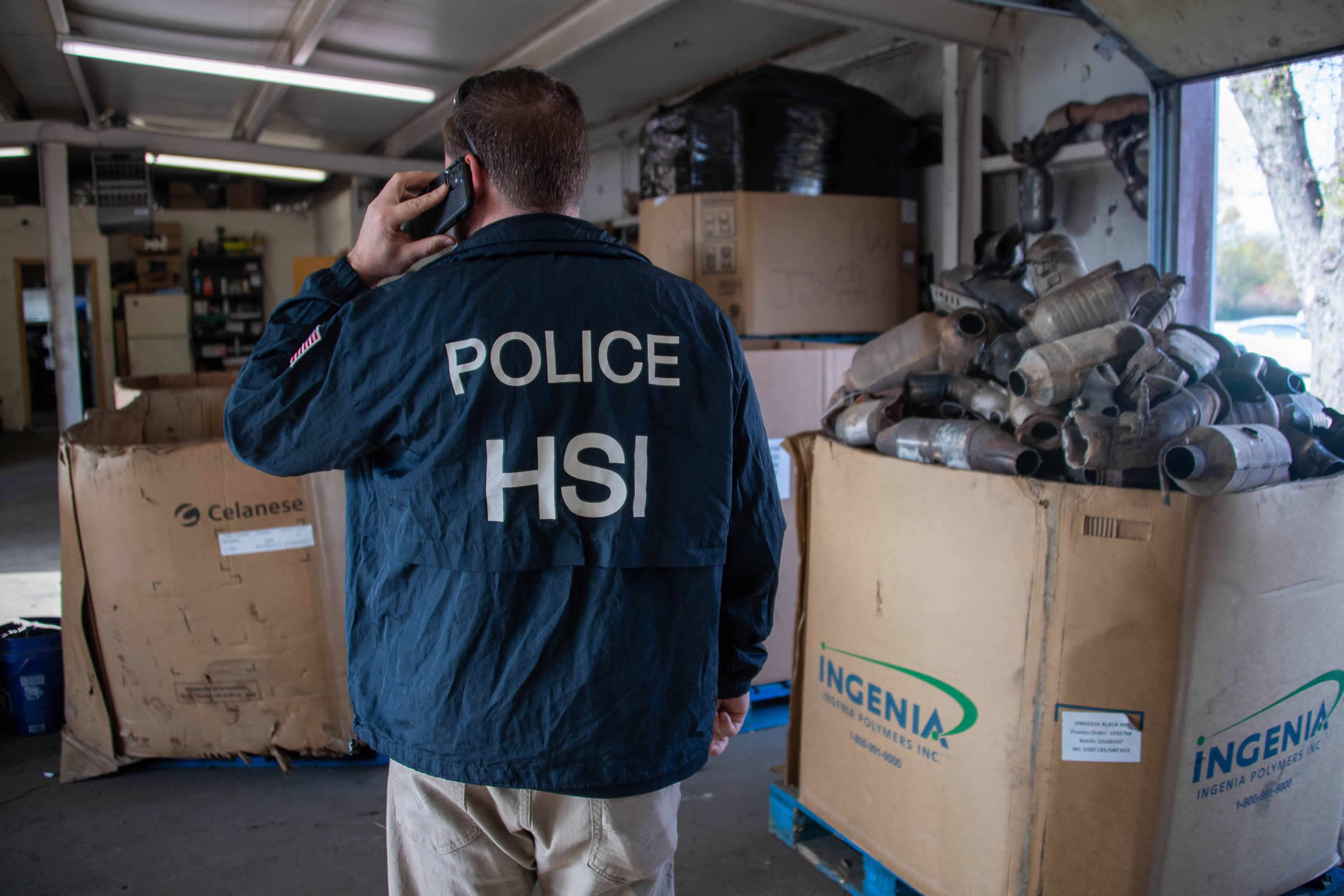
- Catalytic converters seized during Operation Heavy Metal
- Years active: 2020–2022
- Territory: California; Colorado; Connecticut; Minnesota; New York; New Jersey; Oklahoma; Oregon; Texas; Virginia
- Activities: Theft and sale of catalytic converters; Car theft
- Notable members: Tyler Curtis; Navin Khanna; Tinu Khanna

From 2020 to 2022, an organized criminal group stole and then resold catalytic converters through the United States. The regional theft rings sent their stolen catalytic converters to DG Auto Parts in Freehold, New Jersey, who removed the precious metals from them and ground them into dust. The precious metals were then sold to Dowa Metals and Mining America for refining, after which they were sent to Japan; these sales are believed to have generated approximately $545 million in revenue for DG Auto Parts.

The investigation that led to the discovery of the interstate theft ring was prompted by a wave of catalytic converter thefts in the Oklahoma area in late 2020 and early 2021, with similar rises across the United States. On May 2, 2021, police became aware of Tyler Curtis, the owner of Curtis Cores in Broken Arrow, Oklahoma, when he was involved in a traffic stop where (among other illicit things) 128 catalytic converters were found in the bed of his pickup truck; all had jagged edges, suggesting they had been stolen. By September, a team of investigators had linked Curtis Cores with DG Auto Parts, which was owned by Navin and Tinu Khanna.

The investigation expanded between then and the third quarter of 2022, by which time it was nicknamed Operation Heavy Metal, included over 70 local and federal agencies and linked independent investigations into regional theft rings in California, Colorado, Connecticut, Minnesota, New York and Virginia. On November 2, police executed simultaneous search warrants across the US on over 32 sites, resulting in 21 arrests in 5 states. The dismantling of the interstate theft ring was described as the first national takedown of a catalytic converter theft ring by the Department of Justice.

Following the dismantling of the interstate theft ring, the theft of catalytic converters dropped dramatically. According to the National Insurance Crime Bureau, over 5,000 catalytic converter thefts were reported per month in 2022. In the first nine months of 2023, there were 2,675 catalytic converter thefts reported per month.

== Background ==
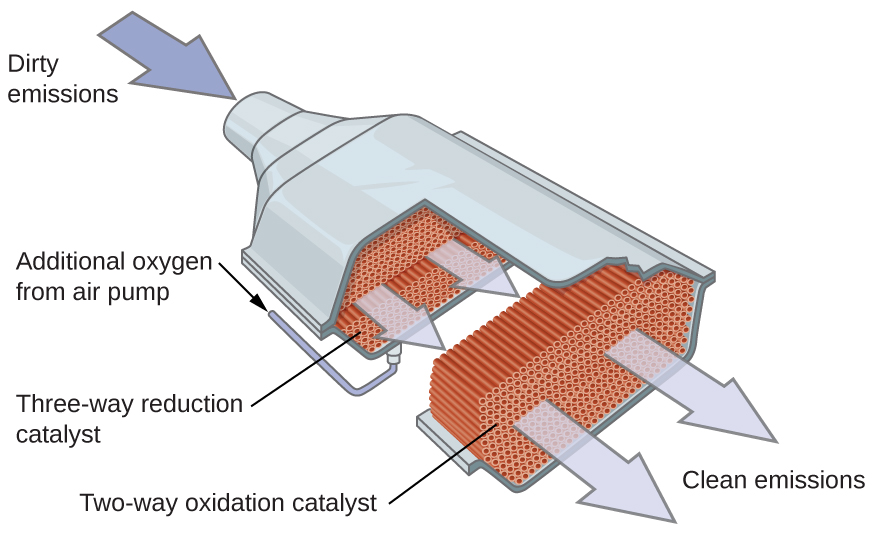
Cutaway of a catalytic converter

A catalytic converter is a typically oblong-shaped vehicle emissions control device that makes up part of an automobile's exhaust system. The catalytic converter accelerates a chemical reaction using heat and precious metals contained within the device, such as platinum, rhodium, and palladium (PRP), to transform toxic engine exhaust gases into less-toxic pollutants and other non-polluting gases. Catalytic converters became mandatory in American automobiles following the Clean Air Act of 1975, but are easy to surreptitiously remove from vehicles.

According to a 2023 report by the National Insurance Crime Bureau (NICB), metal recyclers will often "pay between $50 to $250 for a catalytic converter and up to $800 for one that was removed from a hybrid vehicle." The devices are typically much more valuable to the theft's victim: "it can cost between $1,000 and $3,500 or more to replace a catalytic converter that is stolen, depending on the type of vehicle." In 2022, catalytic converter thefts cost victims over $382 million.

From 2001 to 2021, the price of PRP rose dramatically: platinum rose from $530 per ounce to about $1100 ($964.00 to $1,307, adjusted for inflation). This led to an epidemic of thefts targeting the device for sale to scrap dealers. In a 2021 report, the NICB stated that "in 2018, there were 1,298 catalytic converter thefts reported. In 2019, 3,389 thefts were reported. In 2020, reported catalytic converter thefts jumped massively to 14,433, with December leading the way with 2,347 thefts, or roughly 16 percent of the yearly total – in just one month." According to records from Carfax, which examined service records that listed 'stolen' as the reason for the catalytic converter replacement, it is estimated that 153,000 catalytic converters were stolen in America in 2022.

Initially, the operation of the theft scheme appeared a continuation of this baseline trend. In the 2023 report, the NCIB stated that "based on insurance claims, thefts of catalytic converters increased significantly from 2020 through 2022". In addition, there were 16,660 insurance claims for catalytic converter thefts in 2020, a number that had increased to 64,701 by 2022. The report also stated that the highest rate for catalytic converter theft claims between 2020 and 2022 was California, with 24,102 thefts reported to insurers. In 2022 alone, an average of 1,600 catalytic converters were reported stolen each month in California.

=== Dowa Metals & Mining America ===
Dowa Holdings is a precious metals refiner that began in 1884 as a mining operation in the town of Kosaka, Akita Prefecture. The company specialized in mining kuroko ore, a rare black volcanic deposit found only in Japan and primarily in Akita Prefecture in the Hokuroku Basin. Dowa expanded its domestic mining operations during the early 20th century and began exploring international opportunities for expansion in the 1940s. By 1990 Kosaka Mine had closed and by 1994 Dowa's domestic operations in Japan were suspended "due to economic changes and the depletion of ore".

In 2015, Dowa Holdings established Dowa Metals & Mining America, starting their operations at a refinery in Burlington, New Jersey, some time after. After Dowa evaluated the PRP dust that it received, it would pay its suppliers and refine the dust into chunks in their refinery. It is unknown as to whether Dowa Metals & Mining America performed any form of vetting on DG Auto Parts. The chunks would then be shipped to Tanaka Precious Metals in Akita, where they would be prepared for sale. Between 2018 and 2022, Tanaka Precious Metals' annual revenue increased by approximately 20% to $288 million.

=== DG Auto Parts ===
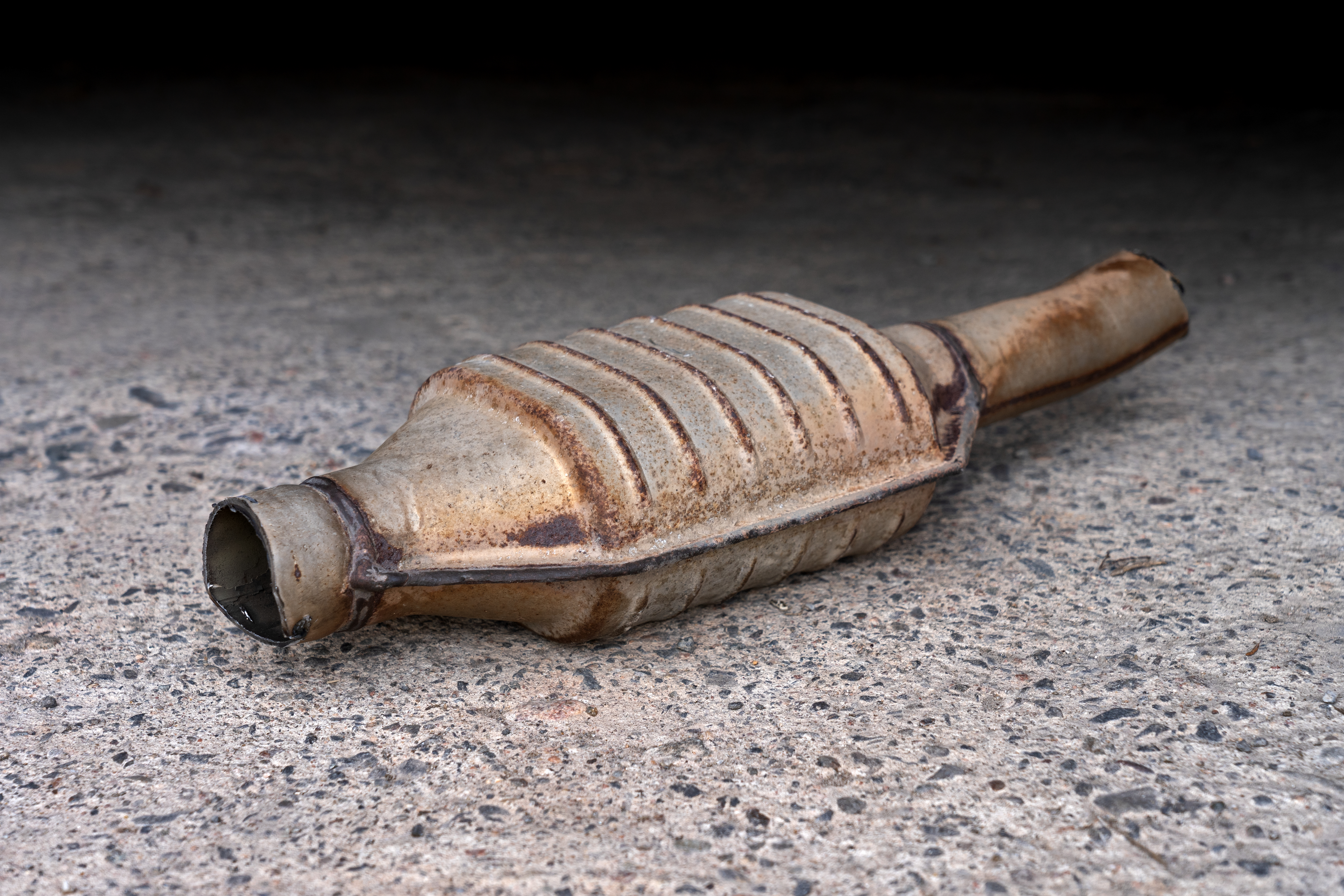
A catalytic converter (not from DG Auto Parts)

Navin and his brother, Tinu Khanna, were first-generation immigrants from India. Their older brothers owned and operated a wrecking yard and, after working there for a few years, Navin and Tinu began their own business ventures. In 2016 they began a rubber disposal business, in 2018 they began a recycling business and in 2019 they also started a company in the auto wrecking industry under the name DG Auto Wreckers. According to an interview performed by Navin with ACE Finance, none of their prior endeavors succeeded until DG Auto Wreckers; this success was due to finding Dowa Metals & Mining America.

A subpoena into the brothers' bank records corroborated the interview: between March 2021 and April 2022, a total of $224 million was transferred by Dowa into a single account used by DG Auto Parts. A further $175 million was discovered on another account.

DG Auto Wreckers traded in used car parts, including catalytic converters. Initially, the business remained small, with sellers bringing in small loads from across New Jersey. However, when the COVID-19 pandemic began, the prices of PRP metals rose drastically. In December 2019, rhodium cost $6,000 per ounce and by March 2021, the price rose to $21,000 per ounce, with platinum and palladium seeing similar rises.

The brothers incorporated the business as DG Auto Parts in February 2020 and moved to the Freehold, New Jersey, site. They decided to focus on catalytic converter recycling and bought four decanning machines. These machines break apart the catalytic converters and demolish the cores into dust, which was then collected and sent to Dowa's refinery in Burlington, New Jersey. That year, DG Auto Parts bought a site in Emporia, Virginia, which they named DG Auto South, and began partnering with converter businesses across the US, including Curtis Cores. A neighboring business' manager said "people would come with tractor trailers and drop them off. Dumpsters full of cat[alytic converter]s. They were working 24 hours." Investigations would later reveal that DG Auto Parts did not care whether their supplies were obtained legally.

By 2021, the business had a website and an app for both Android and iOS which showed, for a subscription, the real-time pricing of thousands of catalytic converter codes, submit photos of their catalytic converters for advance grading and pricing and settle on a price prior to shipping their catalytic converters. The codes on catalytic converters identify the make, model and place of origin of catalytic converters, which in turn identify their value, due to variation in state emission laws. As an example, GD3 EA6 denotes a Toyota Prius manufactured between 2004 and 2009; at the peak of the PRP metal prices, its high palladium content could sell for more than $1,800.

As the profits grew, DG Auto Parts began making advance payments in the millions to their largest suppliers, including Curtis Cores, so that they too could provide their suppliers with the highest prices to maximize the supply of catalytic converters.

== Initial investigation ==
Curtis and Low, texting about arrests of local cutters

Low: yep, hopefully no names
Curtis: That's what I was thinking with the notepad they found. you never told them my name right?
Low: nope
Curtis: Good. I hope they never wrote your name down either.
Low: I know
Curtis: Just be careful

The investigation that led to the discovery of the theft ring began in late 2020 and early 2021, when a wave of catalytic converter thefts struck the Tulsa, Oklahoma area. Police began arresting "cutters", low-level criminals responsible for stealing catalytic converters. The police then attempted to get the cutters to reveal who they were selling to. According to the cutters, one such person was Steven Low Sr., an insurance agent and dealer in catalytic converters. In May 2021, GPS tracked Low's vehicle to an automobile recycling warehouse on Oklahoma State Highway 51 in Broken Arrow.

=== Curtis Cores ===
The warehouse was owned by Tyler Curtis, who was already of interest to investigators: in a February 2021 Facebook Marketplace exchange, Curtis had told an undercover investigator it "does [not] matter where they [the catalytic converters] came from...." On May 2, two days after Low's visit, the Tulsa Police Department stopped Curtis' vehicle, following a tip: an off-duty officer had spotted a "suspicious white pickup truck...with multiple catalytic converters in the bed" driving through southeast Tulsa. A search of the vehicle revealed contraband and other tools commonly associated with criminal activity: a loaded handgun; a small bag containing three grams of cocaine and eight grams of heroin; a bundle of cash amounting to $9,900; and 128 catalytic converters with jagged ends, suggesting that they had been stolen.

The officers then called a lieutenant, their liaison with the Federal Bureau of Investigation (FBI) regarding the theft wave. Questioned on where the catalytic converters came from, Curtis claimed that his automobile recycling business which had opened in January 2021, Curtis Cores, had obtained them legally.

Curtis and his passenger were then arrested for possession of drugs and an unpermitted firearm. To legally possess the catalytic converters, Curtis needed a scrap metal license, which Curtis did not possess; however, he said that his father had submitted an application for the permit. It was later discovered that, while he was in jail, he made a recorded phone call in which he asked his parents to remove incriminating objects from the warehouse. Curtis pleaded guilty or no contest in the Tulsa County District Court to the drug and firearm charges, receiving a three-year deferred sentence.

After releasing Curtis on bail, police obtained a search warrant regarding Curtis' seized phone and iPad. On these devices, they discovered a Facebook messaging group including Curtis, a man called Navin Khanna and another called Adam Sharkey.

=== DG Auto Parts ===
By September, a team of investigators, led by Brad Staggs and Kansas Core, had identified that the stolen catalytic converters were being transported from across the US to a Freehold, New Jersey, company called DG Auto Parts where the cores were extracted and then shipped overseas.

In December, Kansas Core had obtained a warrant to place a 24-hour surveillance camera on a pole outside Curtis Cores. Vehicles arrived daily, sometimes hourly, full of catalytic converters. Curtis and his employees would then unload the converters, inspect them, and pay cash. Then the converters would be packed into cardboard boxes, wrapped in plastic and loaded onto pallets for transport. The business handled between 5,000 and 6,000 catalytic converters per week. These catalytic converters would then be transported either directly to DG Auto Parts or to Adam, an intermediary in New York.

Several weeks after Kansas Core gained the warrant to surveil Curtis Cores, he gained a search warrant for Curtis's Facebook account. Looking through his account, they—alongside a team associated with the Homeland Security Investigations (HSI) division in Tulsa—traced the development of the trafficking ring. Curtis had started working at Green Country Auto Core part-time three years before his arrest. Green Country's owner, Dave Edwards, trained Curtis extensively on the catalytic converter recycling industry and described Curtis as "good at his job [and] a hustler."

Between May and August 2020, Curtis found DG Auto Parts and put the owner, Navin Khanna, in contact with Edwards. Edwards would later say of Navin "I didn't deal with that guy [Navin Khanna] much. Curtis dealt with him...I did talk to the guy—just kind of rubbed me the wrong way." Court documents would later reveal that Green Country Auto Core had sold approximately $2 million worth of catalytic converters to them. In late 2020, Curtis told Edwards that he would be starting his own business and that he would be bringing DG Auto Parts with him. Edwards later said of this "I felt I wasted a lot of time on him, showing him the business. Would've been nice to have a little warning, couple of weeks at least. In hindsight, it's probably the best thing that happened to me."

== Dismantling the state theft rings ==
Kansas Core and other investigators started filing for more warrants: intercepting calls made to and from Curtis's phone, tracking the locations of his employees' phones, and monitoring their Facebook accounts. Another warrant authorized a pole camera outside Curtis's home, where he lived with his wife, on a large plot of land owned by his in-laws.

Since Curtis Cores had received stolen catalytic converters, he could be prosecuted in federal court. A regular delivery arrived from Houston, Texas, where the sellers specialized in "torpedo"-type catalytic converters – named for their distinctive shape – extracted from Toyota Tacoma and Tundra pickup trucks.

=== Texas ===
On March 31, 2022, in Houston, off-duty sheriff's deputy Darren Almendarez was grabbing groceries with his wife, and parked their Toyota Tundra outside of a Joe V's Smart Shop north of the city. Leaving the store, Almendarez noticed that a black Nissan Altima had backed up to his vehicle. Almendarez had worked in an auto theft unit in the Harris County Sheriff's Office and recognized an apparent catalytic converter theft in progress. As he approached, two men clambered out from under his truck and into the Altima, and he told his wife to run away and call the police. The driver of the Altima raised a handgun; Almendarez drew his own; in the ensuing shootout, Almendarez and two men inside the Altima were shot; and then the men fled.

Almendarez was rushed to Houston Northwest Hospital, where he was pronounced dead. Not long after, Joshua Stewart and Fredarius Clark arrived at the same hospital seeking treatment for gunshot wounds. Following treatment, they were taken into custody. A third suspect, Fredrick Tardy, was arrested the following day.

Houston police suspected that the three men delivered their stolen goods into a supply chain running through Tulsa. Staggs would later describe the Houston police as "highly motivated, obviously, to go out and take these people down...So we took this detour in our investigation to provide them with anything we could."

A week after Almendarez's death, the pole camera monitoring Curtis Cores recorded a black GMC pickup truck with Texas license plates pulling a U-Haul trailer of catalytic converters. The truck was traced back to Isaac Castillo, a Houston resident. Houston police had already stopped Castillo in February 2022, when he was driving a pickup carrying catalytic converters, discovering an unlicensed firearm and $25,000 in cash. Upon his return to Texas, police stopped Castillo again. Searching the truck, police discovered a box containing $206,000 in cash. Castillo continued to deny any wrongdoing, claiming that the money was a result of selling scrap in Oklahoma.

However, police continued to investigate, and identified Castillo as a member of a "Ley Road gang". Houston police and the Houston HSI alleged that the three men accused of Almendarez's death had been using the Ley Road gang and another gang as fences for the catalytic converters they stole. On July 28 that year, officers from Houston HSI, Harris County Sherriff's Office, Houston Police Department and the Texas Department of Public Safety raided the Ley Road gang, seizing over $484,000, 29 firearms, narcotics, a stolen Dodge Challenger SRT Hellcat and 477 catalytic converters worth an estimated $11–12 million. At the time, Castillo was not among those detained. The police obtained a warrant to locate his phone, which placed him at Curtis Cores making another delivery.

Shortly after leaving, Castillo was stopped by police for a third time, and this time arrested. Castillo would later tell investigators that Curtis kept $500,000 in his desk drawer and knew the catalytic converters he obtained and sold were stolen. When interviewed, one of the gang's leaders told police that Curtis had instructed him as to what vehicles to steal from.

=== Virginia ===
According to court documents, Theodore Nicholas Papouloglou incorporated DG Auto South in Emporia, Virginia, in November 2020. He incorporated the business as a "scrap metal business" and a "money transmission business". Neither he nor the business were registered as a money transmitting business, as required by the Department of the Treasury and by Virginia laws. Papouloglou received over $12.2 million in wired payments from DG Auto Parts between 2020 and 2021. He bought stolen catalytic converters from thieves in the area, which would then be transported to DG Auto Parts for shipment to Dowa. He also helped DG Auto Parts to buy catalytic converters from other sellers across state lines, including from Texas and Oklahoma, paying for these in bulk cash payments, with the total paid out by Papouloglou being at least $6.6 million.

Despite this income, he paid no taxes on it during that time frame. A federal indictment was filed on March 19, 2024, including four counts; two of evasion of income tax assessments, one of conspiracy to transfer, receive, conceal and sell stolen goods and one of operating an unlicensed money transmitting business. An arrest warrant was filed that day. He pleaded not guilty to all counts the following day, however he later plead guilty to the first count of evasion of income tax assessments and to the count of conspiracy to transfer, receive, conceal and sell stolen goods on August 20 that year. On March 12, 2025, he was sentenced to two years and three months in prison.

=== Oregon ===
According to an indictment from July 2022, Tanner Hellbusch, who bought and resold cars and their components, began stealing catalytic converters sometime prior to February 2021. He was identified as a major local source of stolen catalytic converters, either stealing them himself or buying them from thieves and selling them on. At the time he lived with Jerrica Oga-Garo, his new fiancée, in Oak Hills, Beaverton, Oregon; he and his fiancée operated the business from their home, using the property to store catalytic converters and meet with buyers. Hellbusch placed advertisements on Facebook Marketplace looking for new suppliers.

In 2021, Oregon passed a law requiring that scrap metal businesses make a record of all catalytic converter purchases, including the vehicle identification number that they came from. This law also made it illegal to perform these transactions with cash. This led Hellbusch to try and find other buyers, leading him to begin selling catalytic converters through Brennan Doyle.

Doyle began his own business buying stolen catalytic converters from across the Western US in early 2021, with Hellbusch becoming one of his major suppliers. Doyle then found Adam Sharkey, after which he bought a warehouse in Aurora, Oregon, recruiting some of his friends to help him run the business. Jenna Wilson, with whom he had an intermittent relationship with, helped with the accounting, while Benjamin Jamison (who Doyle had known since high school) met with prospective buyers and handled transactions. By mid–2022, Brennan Doyle and Benjamin Jamison moved to a lakefront rental property on South Shore Boulevard, Lake Oswego, Oregon. The property was a two-bedroom house, costing $5,000 a month to rent. They also bought a $15,000 speedboat and held parties at the house.

An officer from the Beaverton Police Department and a detective from Clackamas County, Oregon, provided information that pointed towards Hellbusch being a major source of stolen catalytic converters. Based on this, the Beaverton Police Department began an investigation into the theft ring. By mid–2022, two dozen officers from various entities were surveilling the Lake Oswego property and the Aurora warehouse, however, the department had difficulties proving that Doyle knew he was receiving stolen catalytic converters.

In an effort to help prove this, the Oregon Department of Justice allowed the Beaverton Police Department to wiretap four phones, including Doyle's. Using these wiretaps and freight receipts, detectives unravelled the organisation and discovered Doyle's connection to Adam Sharkey. The wiretaps were so successful because of how indiscreet Doyle was with his dealings, he often called his friends to discuss the shipping of catalytic converters, which included who was performing the deliveries and what they contained.

Over mid–2022, Phillip Kearney, then assistant special agent in charge at the Oregon Department of Justice, began seizing the ring's assets and intercepting their wire transfers. Another alleged accomplice of Doyle, his childhood friend Casey Smith, complained online about how he was unable to access his bank account, losing access to $130,000. Later, Doyle and his alleged accomplices met to discuss whether their accounts had been frozen or whether the incidents were coincidences, and to discuss ways to get around their issues, unaware that Kearney had followed them.

A SWAT team raided Hellbusch's house while police raided the Lake Oswego property and the Aurora warehouse on August 3, 2022, discovering almost $40,000 in cash in Doyle's bedroom and 3,000 catalytic converters at the warehouse. 14 people were indicted by a grand jury, almost all of which were charged with various crimes including racketeering, theft and money laundering. Among them, Wilson, Jamison, Hellbusch and Oga-Garo were charged with theft and racketeering while Smith was charged with racketeering. Doyle was charged with 90 counts relating to aggravated theft, money laundering, racketeering and unlawfully receiving stolen metal, with Hellbusch facing 25 counts under similar charges.

In total, Beaverton police believe that the theft ring stole approximately $22 million in catalytic converters over the approximately two years it was operational, $10 million of which passed through Doyle, with chief deputy district attorney Bracken McKey stating in September 2022 stating that they still hadn't tracked all of the funds.

Despite the fact that Operation Heavy Metal was ongoing at the time, the investigation did not track catalytic converter thefts further than connecting the Sharkey's to the interstate theft ring, thus missing the connection to Oregon.

=== Connecticut ===
Downpipe Depot and Recycling was a business owned by Alexander Kolitsas in East Hartford and Wolcott, Connecticut that operated between January 2021 and June 2022. They operated similarly to the other groups, buying catalytic converters from thieves before transporting and selling them to DG Auto Parts and an unnamed recycling business in New York, sometimes receiving over $200,000 per sale. He was assisted by Bryant Bermudez, who started there around November 2021.

One of the thieves, Yanquee Rodriguez, was paid $411,845 between January 2021 and May 2022, for supplying stolen catalytic converters to Downpipe Depot and Recycling; records seized during the investigation showed that he was their largest supplier. Other thieves included in the network were Roberto Alicea, Francisco Ayala, Theodore Roosevelt Owens, Marvin Figueroa and Michael Almodovar. In total, Kolitsas paid thieves $3,345,675 for stolen catalytic converters between January 26 and May 31, 2022.

According to court documents, Kolitsas and Bermudez stored firearms at Downpipe Depot and Recycling and Kolitsas' home. During the investigation, it was revealed that Almodovar had sold approximately $34,000 of stolen catalytic converters to Downpipe Depot and Recycling; in a post on his social media, he described attacking a witness with a knife before stealing a catalytic converter. Several search warrants were executed on June 1, 2022, resulting in the seizure of five firearms, $47,000 from Kolitsas, $20,000 from Bermudez, approximately $8,000 from Downpipe Depot and Recycling and several vehicles.

A federal indictment for one count of conspiracy to transport stolen property and one or more counts of interstate transportation of stolen property was passed down for Kolitsas, Bermudez, Alicea, Ayala and Owens on August 16, 2022. Kolitsas was further indicted for promotional money laundering, two counts of engaging in monetary transactions with proceeds of specified unlawful activity, and possession of firearms by an unlawful drug user or addict. Bermudez and Alicea were arrested on 23 August, Ayala was in state custody and Owens was in federal custody for unrelated offences. Kolitsas turned himself in on August 24. Alicea pleaded guilty on June 23, 2023, with sentencing scheduled for September 5.

A superseding indictment was passed down in November 2023 including Kolitsas, Rodriguez, Figueroa and Almodovar. Figueroa and Rodriguez were arrested on November 15, 2023. Figueroa pleaded guilty to conspiracy to commit interstate transportation of stolen property and interstate transportation of stolen property on October 9, 2024, and was sentenced to 14 months federal imprisonment on 8 April 2025 to be followed by three years of probation. Rodriguez pleaded guilty to one count of conspiracy to commit interstate transportation of stolen property and one count of interstate transportation of stolen property on June 26, 2024. He was sentenced on February 20, 2025, to 15 months imprisonment followed by three years of probation. Almodovar was arrested and later sentenced in federal court to 14 months imprisonment.

Kolitsas pleaded guilty to one count of conspiracy to commit interstate transportation of stolen property and one count of promotional money laundering on October 7, 2024. He was released on a $150,000 bond and sentenced on 21 April the following year to five years imprisonment followed by two years probation. He was ordered to report to prison on July 14.

Ayala pleaded guilty to conspiracy to commit interstate transportation of stolen property and interstate transportation of stolen property on April 4, 2023, with sentencing scheduled for July 13 that year. Bermudez pleaded guilty to conspiracy to commit interstate transportation of stolen property and three counts of interstate transportation of stolen property on April 10. His sentencing was scheduled for July 12 that year, though was later postponed until 15 May 2025. He was fined $20,000 and ordered to perform 300 hours of community service over three years of probation.

=== Colorado ===
Following a rise in catalytic converter thefts in Weld County, Colorado, Weld County Sherriff's Office (WCSO) began investigating in 2021. This later led police to Elevation Auto Core in Brighton, Colorado. In 2022, the WCSO was contacted by the Colorado Bureau of Investigation and HSI. The investigation expanded to the state and federal level because Elevation Auto Core was a part of the larger theft ring, including a business in Las Vegas, Nevada.

Police tracked one of Curtis's employees, Shane Minnick, to Elevation Auto Core on May 2, 2022, after which they discovered that the employee would soon be traveling back to Tulsa. Minnick was stopped at the airport, where a cash-sniffing dog alerted officers to his bag, which contained $500,000 in cash. Minnick signed the money over to the police.

According to arrest papers in the case, undercover officers and confidential informants wearing cameras found they could walk in and easily sell "obviously stolen catalytic converters". Despite changes to Colorado law requiring identification and other personal information to be collected in the sale of catalytic converters, little to no questions were asked in three different sting operations. The catalytic converters were then (similar to the Curtis Cores operation) packaged and placed onto pallets to be transported out of state (most of which were sent to the "east coast" or overseas) or decanned on-site.

Six men were taken into custody in both Colorado and Nevada on December 13, 2022, charged with violations of the Colorado Organized Crime Control Act, Colorado tax laws, theft, and money laundering.

=== Minnesota ===
Text conversation between Johnson and a dissatisfied cutter in April 2022

Take it to the scrapyard if you want to be more fair, oh wait that’s right they won’t buy it […] you can’t take them to the scrapyard because you stole it from somebody’s vehicle [...] This is the black market, this ain’t Walmart.

Between May 2020 and October 2022, four men from Minnesota, John Kotten, Justin Johnson, Soe Moo, and James Jensen, managed a theft ring where cutters stole catalytic converters and transported them to Kotten or Johnson or were instructed to transport them to Jenson or Moo who acted as buyers on their behalf. They would then store the catalytic converters in their homes or in commercial properties while they were sorted, categorized and priced, before transporting approximately 90% of their stock to "high-volume buyers based in New Jersey, Oklahoma, Colorado, and New York" using rented U-Haul vehicles and personal vehicles.

The four bought batches of catalytic converters in several states in late 2021, one of which had an Apple AirTag inside of it. This allowed investigators to track the catalytic converter as it was transported in a shipment worth $425,000 to New York. In August 2022, Moo allegedly traded stolen catalytic converters for several AR-15 style rifles and a firearm with an auto sear.

To maintain the image of a legitimate business in case of an audit or investigation, they also bought scrap cars from sellers or an auction. In order to conceal payments, Johnson also sometimes directed the payments to his father, grandmother and a real estate company. In total, they received approximately $21 million in payments using wire transfers, cash, cheques or a combination of methods; $19 million of this was solely across state lines. Prosecutors said that the group took multiple trips to a buyer in New Jersey in 2021 before flying back to Minnesota, with at least three of these trips netting them a profit of nearly $500,000.

Prior to Kotten's arrest, several search warrants relating to the ring were executed in November 2022 by the Sleepy Eye Police Department and the Brown County Sheriff's Office. He was arrested on November 2 during a federal search warrant where two stolen vehicles were discovered. "Hundreds" of catalytic converters were seized from properties in Hutchinson, Sleepy Eye, St. Paul and Madison Lake alongside trucks, tools and over $500,000.

The four were charged on October 18, 2023, for conspiracy to transport stolen property across state lines, with all four making their first appearances at a federal courthouse in St. Paul on October 24. Kotten and Johnson were further charged with conspiracy to commit money laundering and false statements to a financial institution, while Moo was charged with possession of an automatic firearm. All four originally pleaded guilty, however on December 10, 2024, Kotten pleaded guilty to one count of conspiracy to transport stolen goods across state lines. In November that year, two other members of the ring pleaded guilty to conspiracy and gun crimes.

=== California ===
On May 2, 2019, Vang Auto Core LLC was started by Tou Vang, who was joined soon after by his brother, Andrew Vang. On May 31, Tou was arrested for the theft of a catalytic converter from a Prius. Between May 2 and October 1 that year, Vang Auto Core was already in contact with DG Auto Parts, with their first transaction occurring on October 1. In the following three months, the Vangs withdrew approximately $460,000 in $10,000 increments. This is likely due to the Bank Secrecy Act, a law requiring banks to report transactions larger than $10,000 to the Internal Revenue Service.

In September 2020, a Prius owner in Davis, California, discovered that their catalytic converter had been stolen. Investigation into the theft uncovered footage recorded by a vehicle on the same street, which showed a vehicle stopping near the Prius during the night, much like how the thieves had stopped behind Almendarez's vehicle in Houston. The vehicle and its owner were identified, and surveillance began. The following month, police stopped the vehicle and, upon searching it, discovered a number of catalytic converters inside. Two men were arrested in connection with this, Dao Xiong and Shaneel Lal. Prosecutors charged the two men with the theft of 64 catalytic converters in eight northern California counties.

During surveillance, investigators observed the two men casing neighborhoods during the day, only to return by night to steal catalytic converters. Investigators also tracked Xiong to the Vangs home on Meadowgate Drive, Sacramento.

Text conversation between Tou and Saeteurn

Vang: You back yay! <3
Saeteurn: Back where?
Vang: Buying lol
Saeteurn: One step at a time Not touching tho
Vang: Yeah just you know be careful I'm still buying but very dl very dl
Saeteurn: Yeah imma just stay on the dl

The police acquired a search warrant for a phone confiscated from a known cutter in August 2020. In it, they discovered discussions between the cutter and a man called Choy Saeteurn, a mechanic based in Sacramento, regarding catalytic converters. Police then acquired a search warrant for Saeteurn's Facebook account.

Text conversation between Navin and Saeteurn

Navin: I need more Prius lol.
Saeteurn: Where your boy at Tou
Navin: Dang, he shipped me 300 sets today.

With this search warrant, police discovered that on September 3, 2020, Tou and Saeteurn had a text conversation about Saeteurn returning to buying and selling catalytic converters, saying that he was doing so discreetly. Prosecutors later alleged that Tou was buying discreetly due to his prior arrest in 2019. By September 2020 however, he was already under investigation for the interstate trafficking of catalytic converters.

Navin communicated with Saeteurn a week later on September 10 about a need for more "Prius", referring to Toyota Priuses and their catalytic converters. In this conversation, he referred to Tou directly. The next day, Navin communicated with Saeteurn about Tou shipping 300 catalytic converters to DG Auto Parts. Bank records later showed that DG Auto Parts had paid Vang Auto Core $400,000 for the catalytic converters. In April 2021, shipping manifests showed that Vang Auto Core had shipped two crates weighing a combined 4,370 pounds (1,980 kilograms) to DG Auto Parts. In the two weeks following, DG Auto Parts paid Vang Auto Core a further $975,000.

Police began using a confidential informant to sell catalytic converters to the Vangs at their house some time between April and May 2021. Between then and August that year, the informant made five sales of between two or three catalytic converters at a time. On one occasion, the informant told the Vangs that he had stolen one from a Prius that he'd previously targeted. Andrew responded to this by saying "for future reference, don't say they were stolen."

During a conversation between the confidential informant and Andrew following the purchase of two catalytic converters in August that year, Andrew asked the informant to "see if you can cover it [catalytic converter] better" on return trips to the house, as another seller had "brought hella heat over here" not long prior by arriving in a stolen vehicle.

According to police, many of the cutters that sold to the Vangs were also related to the Tiny Rascal Gang (TRG). The TRG was founded in 1981 in Long Beach, California by Cambodian refugees seeking protection from neighboring gangs. Due to this and the fact the Vangs operated the business from home, the Vangs were known to keep at least five firearms in their house and more than 1,300 rounds of ammunition.

One of the Vangs' neighbors, Joe McElroy, came back from work some time in November 2021, finding the street cordoned off by police; there was yellow crime tape surrounding the Vangs house and a tarp covering a corpse on the driveway. Upon asking around, he discovered that Andrew Vang had shot a burglar who had broken into their house. Not long after, he witnessed a "stream" of police entering the house with dogs and sledgehammers. McElroy later said of this "Cops come over and fucked up the whole house...Just ransacked it. Knocking the walls down. They destroyed it." The Vangs moved out within a few days, with the damage said to have taken approximately eight months to repair.

Due to the nature of the Vangs' operation, investigators speculated that the perpetrators knew about their business and targeted their home expecting to find money there. Andrew was not charged for the shooting, as the shooting was deemed to have been self defense. When the Vangs left their home, they looked to DG Auto Parts to help them. In December 2021, the Khanna brothers paid approximately $1.2 million for a house in northern Sacramento on their behalf.

By the second quarter of 2022, investigators already suspected that DG Auto Parts was the hub for the sale of stolen catalytic converters.

== Sting operations at DG Auto Parts ==
A Wyandotte Nation Tribal Police Department officer stopped a rental truck on May 8, 2022. During the stop a detection dog was used to search the vehicle and it indicated that it had found something. It was discovered that the vehicle was carrying three pallets of catalytic converters and approximately $1.3 million in cash. The driver, Robert Sharkey, "provided various mixed narratives to the purpose of his trip, or the source of the catalytic converters and money." The name Sharkey was already known to police in Tulsa due to his son, Adam Sharkey, DG Auto Parts' associate in New York. According to police, the money had originated from DG Auto Parts and approximately $290,000 was destined for Curtis Cores.

Robert was allegedly transferring money to another intermediary, Martynas Macerauskas, in Amarillo, Texas. Martynas was the owner of M&M Auto, a business in Clarendon, Texas who partnered with DG Auto Parts. He would later tell investigators about his dealings with DG Auto Parts, saying "Khanna does not care where the catalytic converters come from, only that he wants the volume so he can keep up with sales to Dowa."

Two days after Robert Sharkey was stopped, Martynas' wife, Kristina, was stopped in Texas with approximately $1.2 million in her vehicle; she told police that she had driven it from DG Auto Parts. In a search of M&M Auto, police found 30 catalytic converters. In total, the Macerauskas' received more than $6 million from DG Auto Parts for catalytic converters.

That same day, the pole camera surveilling Curtis Cores recorded Curtis's employees awaiting Robert's arrival. At approximately 3 a.m., Curtis was informed that Robert had been stopped and that the money had been seized. Curtis then called Adam to inform him. Two days after Robert Sharkey was stopped, Curtis flew to Newark Liberty International Airport and drove to DG Auto Parts while being followed by investigators. When he left, he was carrying approximately $1 million in bags which he then drove back to Oklahoma.

Curtis did become more careful upon returning after the raids against the Connecticut group and the Ley Road gang out of concern that police would link them back to him. He altered how he would buy stolen goods, refused to travel with large sums of money and would routinely check with his wife to ensure the money stashed around their property was safe. Despite this extra care, investigators used a confidential informant who went to Curtis Cores carrying 20 catalytic converters, who told Curtis that he had bought the catalytic converters from "a sketchy motherfucker" who had "just got them from some cars" and, after escaping from police, hid them in a field; Curtis still bought them. When federal investigators later obtained a wiretap for an employee of DG Auto Parts, they recorded Navin on August 5 telling him that traveling with money was too risky and that the police were "busting everybody".

An August drop in PRP prices, particularly palladium, strained DG Auto Parts' finances. One buyer threatened to sue the company for stealing data from the pricing app. There were accusations on their Facebook page that the brothers offered large sums of money for large quantities of catalytic converters and then refused to pay. In September 2022, DG Auto Parts announced that it had secured funding out of its financial difficulties with private investment firm Barrett Edge, who praised the Khanna brothers as "consummate professionals".

Meanwhile, investigators sent confidential informants to DG Auto Parts for months to sell catalytic converters, all the while emphasizing that they were stolen. In a Facebook message, Navin said, "every cat in Cali [is] stolen I can promise you that". Federal indictments later alleged that on September 1, a confidential informant claimed that their cousin worked in a Toyota warehouse and that they could steal catalytic converters and "bricks" (cores that had not yet been put into catalytic converters) from the Priuses stored there. The brothers agreed to the plan, paying $259,000 for 402 bricks and 98 catalytic converters.

== Operation Heavy Metal ==
By the third quarter of 2022, the investigation into the interstate catalytic converter theft ring was reaching its conclusion. Now nicknamed Operation Heavy Metal, the investigation had grown to include over 70 local and federal agencies. By chance, investigators in Operation Heavy Metal discovered the investigation into the Vang family; as such, the investigation was merged into Operation Heavy Metal. It was later discovered that Vang Auto Core had sold over $38 million of catalytic converters to DG Auto Parts. The case had become so large that agents from multiple different agencies had to meet together in Philadelphia, Pennsylvania, to coordinate the final stages of the investigation.

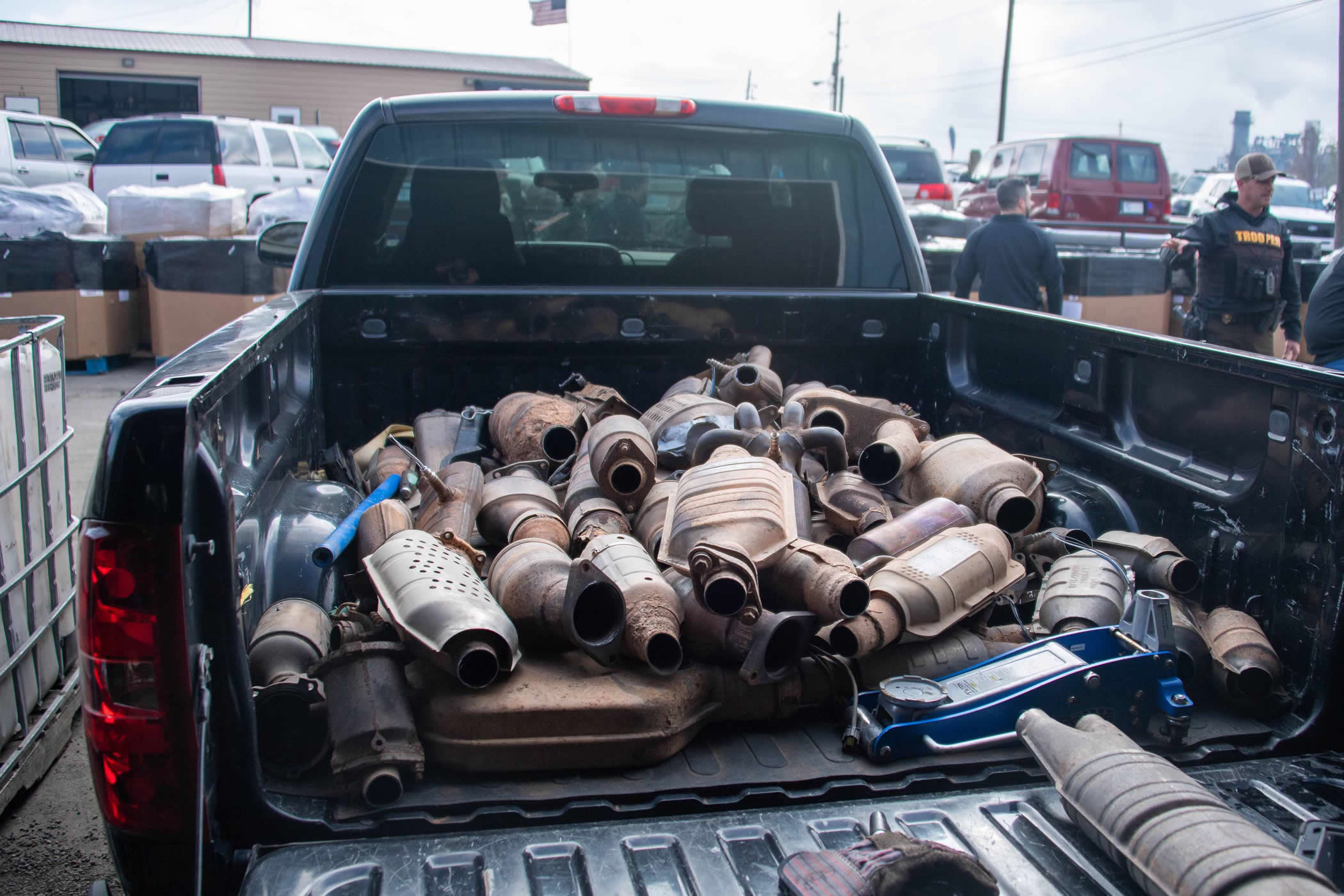
Catalytic converters seized during the raid on Curtis Cores

On the morning of November 2, the owner of a store adjacent to Curtis Cores, Jeremy Jones of JT Auto, was in his office grabbing a cup of coffee when he witnessed the police storming into Curtis Cores. He later said of the day, "I look out the window and something caught my eye—it was like a SWAT team. There's a tank. There's guys with assault rifles and military gear." Curtis, who had left shortly before the raid, returned not long after and was arrested. Six of his partners and employees and his wife were arrested the same day.

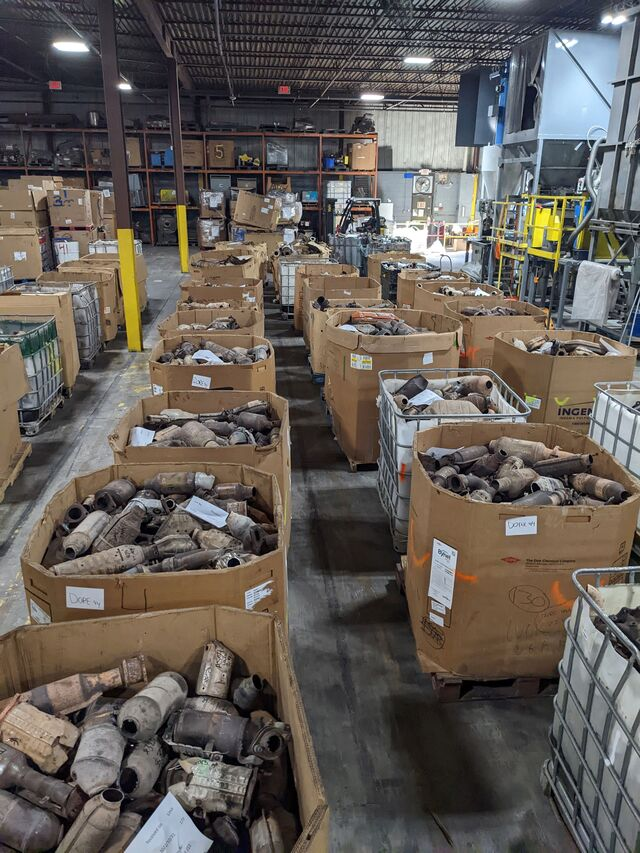
Catalytic converters seized during the raid on DG Auto Parts

Police used a helicopter and officers riding all-terrain vehicles to search unsuccessfully for the money stashed on his wife's family's land where he and his wife lived. Staggs said of this "he probably has money hidden somewhere that we'll never find". Curtis admitted in an August 2025 plea agreement that he had received approximately $16 million from DG Auto Parts between March 2021 and October 2022 for the shipment of catalytic converters.

Simultaneously across the US, police executed more than 32 search warrants on locations used by the various organizations involved in the ring, seizing "homes, bank accounts, cash, and luxury vehicles", among other assets, which were valued at "tens of millions of dollars". In total, 21 arrests were made in five states. Seven people associated with DG Auto Parts were among those who were arrested, six of whom had been involved in decanning and selling the metals to refineries.

The Sharkeys gained approximately $45 million from the sale of stolen catalytic converters to DG Auto Parts and were arrested in New York. Curtis received approximately $500,000 from Capital Cores, a company operated by Adam in Long Island, New York.

Over the course of their investigation, police discovered that Dowa Metals & Mining America had paid $545 million in revenue to DG Auto Parts. Prosecutors said that of the approximately $25 million withdrawn from this sum by the Khannas, only $150,000 was recovered. As such, the Khannas were deemed to be a flight risk if released on bail. Despite surveillance and bank records proving Dowa to be the source of DG Auto Parts' money, the company's name was withheld during the indictments against Curtis and the Khannas, only being referred to as an unindicted co-conspirator.

Lauren Horwood, a spokesperson for the Eastern District of California US Attorneys Office, described Operation Heavy Metal as the first national takedown of a catalytic converter theft ring by the Department of Justice.

== Aftermath ==
=== Fall in theft rates ===
Staggs stated that Operation Heavy Metal had drastically cut the rate of catalytic converter thefts, saying "in the four months prior to that national takedown day, there were 250 reports of catalytic converter theft. In the four months after, there were 38." According to the NICB, by 2023 reports of catalytic converter thefts had declined significantly nationwide. In the first nine months of 2023, there were 2,675 catalytic converter thefts reported per month, down from over 5,000 in 2022.

A similar fall was registered in Houston, in March 2022 there were 1,200 catalytic converter thefts reported and on March 31 Deputy Almendarez was killed. The following month the number of reports dropped to approximately 950, falling gradually to 900 reports by July 2022. On July 28 the Ley Road Gang was raided, with the number of reports falling to approximately 400 by the end of the year.

The number of reports stayed steady until May 29 that year, which was when Senate Bill 224, known as the Deputy Darren Almendarez Act, became effective. The act aimed to "provide a framework of offenses, penalties and enhancements", with one of the enhancements being that if a firearm was used in the theft of a catalytic converter, the charge would become a felony. From then, the amount of reports fell gradually to almost zero by February 2024.

=== Further aftermath ===
The government was seeking forfeiture of approximately $545 million in connection with the case; it is unclear whether they received this amount during the search and seizure efforts.

Adam and Robert Sharkey were indicted in October 2022; Adam was charged with 16 counts including conspiracy to receive stolen catalytic converters, conspiracy to commit money laundering, engaging in monetary transactions in property derived from specified unlawful activity, and the sale and receipt of stolen goods. Robert's charges were reduced to misprision of a felony on 5 December 2024. Both pleaded guilty in a federal court in Tulsa on December 9, 2024, with Adam pleading guilty to one count of conspiracy and receiving a mandatory maximum of five years imprisonment. As a part of their plea agreements, both agreed not to challenge the seizure of $1.1 million on May 8 that year in Wyandotte, Oklahoma and the seizure of $38,000 from two bank accounts.

Janice Ayala joined Dowa Metals & Mining America as their Chief Compliance Officer on March 3, 2023. During Ayala's 27-year tenure at the Department of Homeland Security, her most recent role before joining Dowa was as Director of Joint Task Force – Investigations. This agency oversaw the investigation into both DG Auto Parts and Dowa.

Jamison pleaded guilty sometime between the 2022 Oregon indictment and 2024, while Doyle's trial is set for October 29, 2024.

The three men involved in the shooting of Darren Almendarez were later charged with capital murder. The District Attorney's office are seeking the death penalty for Joshua Stewart and Fredarius Clark, while Frederick Tardy, who was 17 at the time, was deemed too young. Tardy was released on a $750,000 bond. The three were awaiting court dates in April 2024. Northeast Community Center in Houston was renamed the Deputy Darren Almendarez Community Center in his honor in August 2023, aiming to "keep his legacy alive in the very community that he and his family called home."

A superseding indictment was unsealed on March 20, 2024, charging Tinu and Navin's mother, father and older brother, Anita, Nirmal and Michael Khanna respectively, with conspiracy to transport stolen catalytic converters from California to New Jersey. The case alleged that, after Tinu and Navin were arrested, Anita, Nirmal and Michael continued buying and selling stolen catalytic converters under DG Auto Parts. The case also alleged that they sold the PRP metals to employees of a New Jersey metal refinery, including Alfredo Mejia and Vishnu Chintaman, via a broker, Ricky Vega, and that they knew the catalytic converters that the metals came from were stolen. All of their cases remain pending as of July 2025.

Tou Vang was sentenced to 12 years imprisonment on May 6, 2025.

Navin Khanna pleaded guilty in the Northern District of Oaklahoma to one count of conspiracy to receive, possess, and transport of stolen goods over state lines and five counts of money laundering in July 2025. His case was transferred to the Eastern District of California, where he pleaded guilty to conspiracy to transport stolen property over state lines, conspiracy to commit promotional money laundering and interstate transportation of stolen property on February 27, 2026. His sentencing is, as of that date, unscheduled. The case of Tinu Khanna remains pending as of July 2025.

Tyler Curtis signed a plea agreement in October 2025, in which he admitted to conspiracy to commit money laundering. He was sentenced to 57 months federal imprisonment followed by three years supervised release on September 1, 2025. He also agreed to forfeit $3.4 million in cash, $212,000 in funds seized from bank accounts and two vehicles. His sentencing on state charges was scheduled for September 30.

== Related operations ==
=== Operation Cut and Run ===
Rafael Davila operated a group which included Davila, Zachary Marshall, Santo Feliberty, Nicolas Davila, Carlos Fonseca, Alex Oyola and Torres. The group targeted vehicles primarily in Massachusetts and New Hampshire between 2022 and April 2023. He was responsible for the planning of and transportation to each theft using a maroon Acura (which was later identified as both linking the thefts and belonging to Rafael Davila), the determining of the value of catalytic converters and the procurement of supplies.

After the thefts, the catalytic converters would be sold to Jose Torres, who stored those he bought from several dealers and then sell them to recycling businesses. Torres would frequently sell the catalytic converters to Downpipe Depot and Recycling and DG Auto Parts, earning between $30,000 and $80,000 per week from them.

Using surveillance footage and the monitoring of communications and location data from the group's phones and Rafael Davila's vehicle, authorities believed that they were responsible for the theft of catalytic converters from at least 471 vehicles in Massachusetts and New Hampshire, though they also believed that a large number of thefts were either unidentified or went unreported.

Members of the group also conspired to and committed other thefts, including from the ATM machines of three federally insured banks in December 2022, a trailer on December 12, 2022, two jewellery stores in New Hampshire on January 12, 2023 and a self-storage building in Northborough in February 2023, resulting in the theft of a truck and $13,000 in Milwaukee power tools, some of which were recovered from a storage unit alleged to have been owned by Rafael Davila during a series of search and arrest warrants that were executed on April 12, 2023, across western Massachusetts. At its end, the investigation expanded to include 78 law enforcement agencies overseen by the FBI and Massachusetts State Police.

The group were arrested and charged in April 2023 with conspiracy to transport stolen property in interstate commerce, interstate transportation of stolen property, conspiracy to commit money laundering, conspiracy to commit bank theft and bank theft.

Rafael Davila pleaded guilty in April 2024 and was sentenced to 10 years imprisonment to be followed by three years of probation on October 1, 2024; Marshall pleaded guilty in November 2023 and was sentenced to 47 months imprisonment and three years probation in April 2024; Feliberty was sentenced to 57 months imprisonment and three years probation in March that year; and Nicolas Davila was sentenced to 37 months imprisonment and five years probation that month. As of February 2025, Fonseca, Oyola and Torres had also pleaded guilty and were awaiting sentencing, with Torres pleading guilty on May 17, 2023, and his sentencing scheduled for September 6 that year.

In the 18 months that followed the dismantling of the group, nine thefts of catalytic converters were reported.
