= Tiny Rascal Gang =

Cambodian-American street gang

- Founded: 1981
- Founding location: Eastside, Long Beach, California
- Years active: 1981–present
- Territory: United States (in roughly 16 US states) and Canada
- Ethnicity: Predominantly Cambodian-American (but also found in Chinese, Korean, Taiwanese, Vietnamese and Laotian communities)
- Membership (est.): 2,000+ active members (1999); 5000–10,000 members and associates (2009)
- Activities: Drug trafficking, assault, arms trafficking, murder, theft
- Allies: 14K; Wah Ching; Wo Hop To; Various Xã hội đen
- Rivals: Asian Boyz; Bloods; Crips; Latin Kings; Sureños; Trinitarios
- Notable members: Run Chhoun; Jonathan Tieu

The Tiny Rascal Gang, (abbreviated TRG) is a primarily Cambodian-American gang based in Long Beach, California. During the 1990s, the Mexican Mafia "green light" hit lists began including the TRG, and Sureños were soon at war with them. The Mexican Mafia ordered the West Side Longo gang to put aside its rivalry with the East Side Longo and support their former rivals against the TRG.

The gang was founded in 1981 for protection by Cambodian youth groups who had escaped the Cambodian genocide. Gang members are as young as 12 years old. A group left the gang and became the Asian Boyz (ABZ). The TRG, the Eastside's first Cambodian gang, had an estimated membership of over 2,000 in 1999 and 5,000 to 10,000 "members and associates" in 2009.

== History ==
The United States began admitting its first Cambodian refugees in 1979 after the Khmer Rouge insurgency. Nearly 158,000 Cambodians were admitted by 1991, most of whom resettled in the states of California, Massachusetts, and New York. Like many refugee groups, lack of knowledge about the culture and society of the host nation and limited command of the English language erected a socio-cultural barrier. Individuals experienced post-traumatic stress disorder and depression, and Cambodian-American communities were deeply affected by poverty.

During the mid-1980s, a Latino student and a Cambodian student in Long Beach fought; this led to the formation of the Tiny Rascals as Cambodian youths began to form street gangs to protect themselves. Gang hand-signs, graffiti, and fashion developed, and the TRG began committing extortion, murder, kidnapping, robbery, burglary, home invasion, and drug and weapons trafficking. Members of the Tiny Rascals Gang had a violent rivalry with the Long Beach-based East Side Longos, who were predominantly Hispanic, during the early 1990s.

The origin of Tiny Rascals Gang is also sometimes considered to be a youth gang formed in Santa Ana in Orange County.

A branch of TRG separated from the rest of the gang and formed Asian Boyz. This gang would later join with other gangs in California like Asian Boys Insanity, and forming groups all around the United States. The rivalry between TRG and Asian Boyz is quite prominent and has crossed interstate with murders on both sides.

At its peak the TRG groups in Washington state consisted of nearly 200 members, making it the largest Asian gang in the state. Unlike California a lot of the members did not join for protection from racist gangs but due to mainstream society not accepting the culture.

In 2014 a documentary released by Byron Q called Raskal Love was released. It follows TRG member Vannu Fut, now a breakdancer and actor. It looks at the origins of TRG in Santa Ana and how TRG moved to Washington State.

As of 2023, a thousand Cambodian-Americans have been deported to Cambodia and fifteen thousand Southeast Asian-Americans face the potential of deportation, including Tiny Rascal Gang members. The deportation is due to a wide range of crimes.

In March 2026 Praney Sa Em was arrested by ICE agents in Garden Grove California and is alleged to be one of the senior leaders of the gang within Long Beach.

== Membership ==
Members of other ethnic and cultural groups are known to have been recruited, primarily on the West Coast and in the Southwest and New England. As with many other gangs, potential members must first be initiated in a "jump in" where they would have to fight other members or endure a beating for a specific amount of time.. Other ways of being recruited to Tiny Rascal Gang is to be "walked in" (which is automatically joining Tiny Rascal Gang as you have pre-existing connections to the gang) and "sexed in" (exclusive for female gang members, where they provide sexual intercourse in order to join the gang).

TRG members are in the US Army, but none were in the US Air Force, Navy, or Marines in 2011. Members are in US prisons, including in South Carolina.

A large portion of Tiny Rascal Gang sets in Washington (along with other Asian Gangs) originate from Breakdancing Crews and Street Racing groups. on the otherhand other sets are formed from the Cambodian divide from other ethnic communities in neighbourhoods.

A lot of members dress in Hispanic Street Gang clothing, shaved heads, tattoos and their primary colours are either grey or blue.

== Activities ==
The Tiny Rascals are involved in criminal activities which include extortion, robbery, burglary, auto theft, gang protection, and murder. Although young gang members are mainly involved in street crime, some have engaged in organized criminal activities. Older subgroups maintain a working relationship with similar groups of the Asian Boyz. They have formed alliances with Chinese organizations such as the 14K, Wah Ching and Wo Hop To in California and the New York City-based Ghost Shadows. The Tiny Rascal Gang also works closely with Vietnamese Drug Trafficking Organisations to import MDMA and high-grade marijuana in some states

Cities such as Anchorage, Alaska and Portland, Oregon have had a TRG presence including gun and drug distribution. Groups of non-Cambodian and non-Asian members are in smaller North Carolina towns, particularly Forest Oaks and Pleasant Garden, which have reported car thefts and gunfire by the gang.

=== California ===
Seven TRG members raped, robbed and strangled a mother in her Tustin home in 1994. The woman, whose three-year-old son was home at the time, survived by playing dead.

A 16-year-old gang member shot and killed a Sacramento police officer in 2007.

TRG members committed a mass shooting in 2019, killing three people and wounding nine; one woman was paralyzed from the chest down.

=== Massachusetts ===
The gang has a presence in the Cambodian-American community of Lowell, Massachusetts. According to local police, about a hundred members have lived in the Lowell and Lynn areas. The gang has been connected to more than five homicides and several assaults in Lowell and Lynn between 1998 and 2021.

=== Pennsylvania ===
Police consider the Tiny Rascal Gang one of the largest Asian gangs in Philadelphia. The gang has a South Philadelphia rivalry with the Red Scorpions, with sporadic shooting.

=== Washington ===
In 1994, Spokane police found the bodies of a 27-year-old man and a 23-year-old woman who had been bound, shot and stabbed. The gang members responsible for the killings were identified by finger- and palm prints left at the scene.

== See also ==
- Deportation of Cambodian immigrants from the United States
- Orange County Men's Central Jail escape
- 2020–2022 catalytic converter theft ring
- George C. Marshall High School Gang violence
