= Paul Kix =

Paul Kix is an American journalist, author, film producer, and entrepreneur.

He worked for two decades in magazines—ultimately as a deputy editor and writer at ESPN the Magazine, while freelancing for publications like The New Yorker, The Atlantic, and Esquire—and since 2020 has focused on writing nonfiction books.

Kix's first book, The Saboteur, an Amazon No.1 best-seller, was optioned by DreamWorks to be turned into a film. His second, You Have to be Prepared to Die Before You Can Begin to Live, also a best-seller, was named to Amazon's and The New York Times' respective Best Books of the Year lists.

The 2023 film The Accidental Getaway Driver is based upon a 2017 piece Kix wrote for GQ. Kix served as an executive producer on the film, which won the Best Director Prize at the Sundance Film Festival.

Kix ghost-edits certain books for celebrities and C-suite executives and founders. He worked with Luke Russert on his 2023 memoir, Look for Me There, a New York Times best-seller.

Kix's course on writing, The Storytelling You, has led students to win Emmy Awards, gain National Magazine Award nominations, and ink six-figure book deals. Kix consults with a select number of founders and business executives.

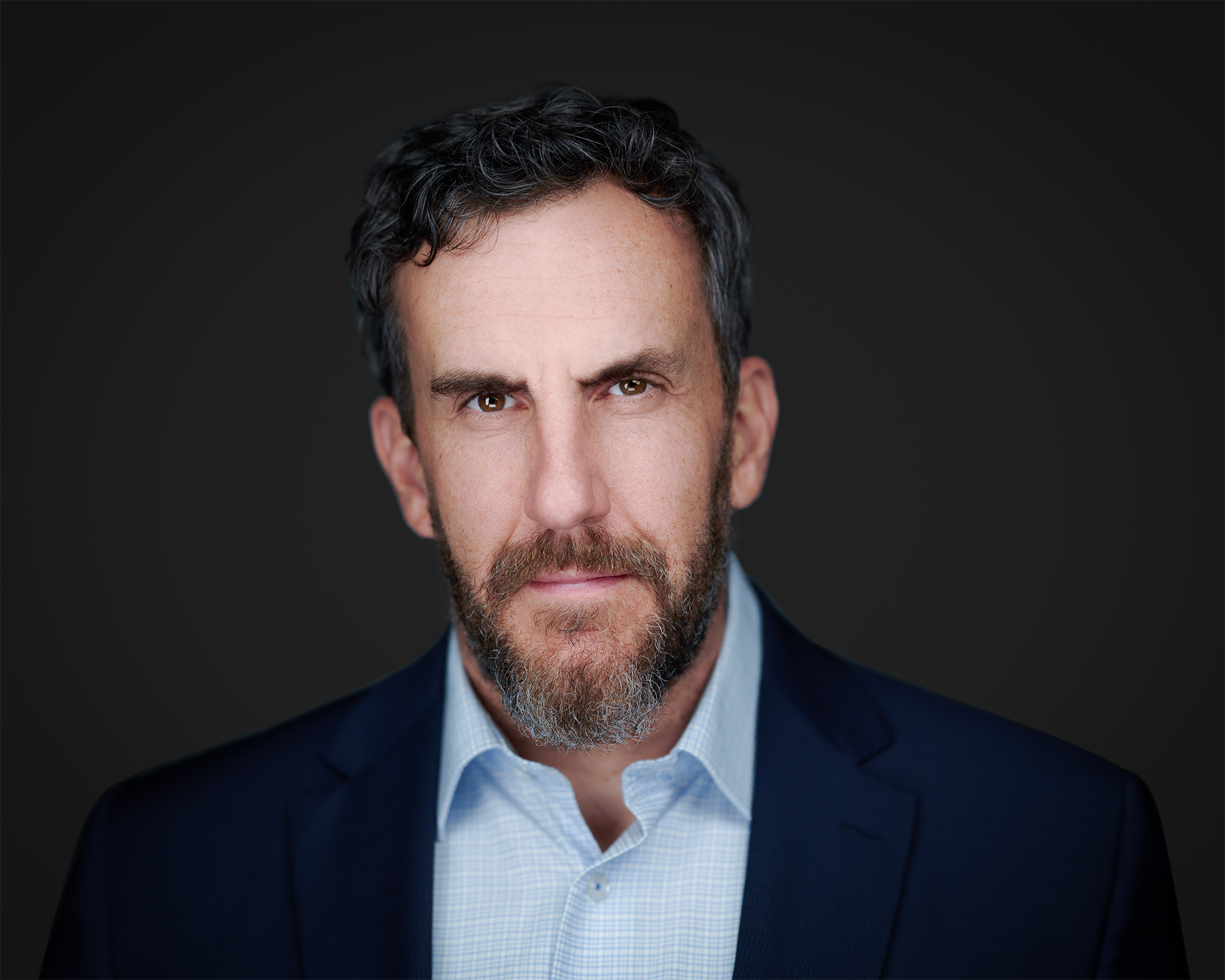
Paul Kix, author photo for his 2023 book, You Have to be Prepared to Die Before You Can Begin to Live

He graduated from Iowa State University in 2003.

== Career ==
Kix started his career at Phoenix New Times before moving on to The Dallas Observer, D Magazine, Boston magazine and ESPN: the Magazine, where he split his time between editing features and writing them. He edited the features of Pulitzer-prize winners, like Eli Saslow, and New York Times best-selling authors like Wright Thompson. At ESPN, Kix was part of a team in 2017 that won the General Excellence Award from the American Society of Magazine Editors (ASME).

The 2023 film The Accidental Getaway Driver is based upon a 2017 piece Kix wrote for GQ. Kix served as an executive producer on the film, which won the Best Director Prize at the Sundance Film Festival.

A 2022 story Kix wrote about two men wrongfully convicted of murder for The Atlantic led President Joe Biden to commute those sentences in 2025.

== Personal life ==
Kix is married with three children and lives in Connecticut.

== Books ==
- You Have to be Prepared to Die Before You Can Begin to Live (Celadon, 2023)
- The Saboteur: The Aristocrat Who Became France's Most Daring Anti-Nazi Commando (2018)
