= The Accidental Getaway Driver =

2023 film by Sing J. Lee

- Theatrical release poster
- Directed by: Sing J. Lee
- Screenplay by: Sing J. Lee; Christopher Chen
- Based on: "The Accidental Get Away Driver" by Paul Kix
- Produced by: Kimberly Steward; Basil Iwanyk; Barbara Broccoli; Jennifer J. Pritzker; Luisa Law; Andy Sorgie; Brendon Boyea; Joseph Hiếu
- Starring: Hiep Tran Nghia; Dustin Nguyen; Phi Vu; Dali Benssalah; Gabrielle Chan
- Cinematography: Michael Cambio Fernandez
- Edited by: Yang-Hua Hu
- Music by: Jon Ong
- Production companies: K Period Media; Thunder Road Films
- Distributed by: Utopia
- Release dates: January 23, 2023 (Sundance); February 28, 2025 (United States)
- Running time: 102 minutes
- Country: United States
- Languages: English; Vietnamese
- Box office: $63,831

The Accidental Getaway Driver is a 2023 American crime drama film directed by Sing J. Lee, his feature directorial debut and co-written by Lee with Christopher Chen. It is inspired by the 2016 abduction of Long Ma, a Vietnamese American taxi driver in Orange County, by three prison escapees. It stars Hiep Tran Nghia, Phi Vu, Dali Benssalah and Dustin Nguyen.

It had its world premiere at the 2023 Sundance Film Festival on January 23, 2023, and was released on February 28, 2025, by Utopia.

== Cast ==
- Hiep Tran Nghia as Long Ma
- Dustin Nguyen as Tay Duong
- Dali Benssalah as Aden
- Phi Vu as Eddie Ly
- Gabrielle Chan as Lan Ma
- Vivien Ngô as Alice
- Cathy Vu as Hanh
- Tiffany Rothman as Linda
- Sharon Sharth as Concierge
- Travon McCall as News Anchor
- Edward Singletary as Motivational Speaker

== Production ==
Production took place in 2022 in Little Saigon and Westminster, California.

== Release ==
It had its world premiere at the 2023 Sundance Film Festival on January 23, 2023, where Lee received the Directing Award in U.S. Dramatic for the film. It was released on February 28, 2025, by Utopia.

== Reception ==
On the review aggregator website Rotten Tomatoes, 84% of 37 critics' reviews are positive. Metacritic, which uses a weighted average, assigned the film a score of 69 out of 100, based on 11 critics, indicating "generally favorable" reviews.
