= Dali Benssalah =

French actor

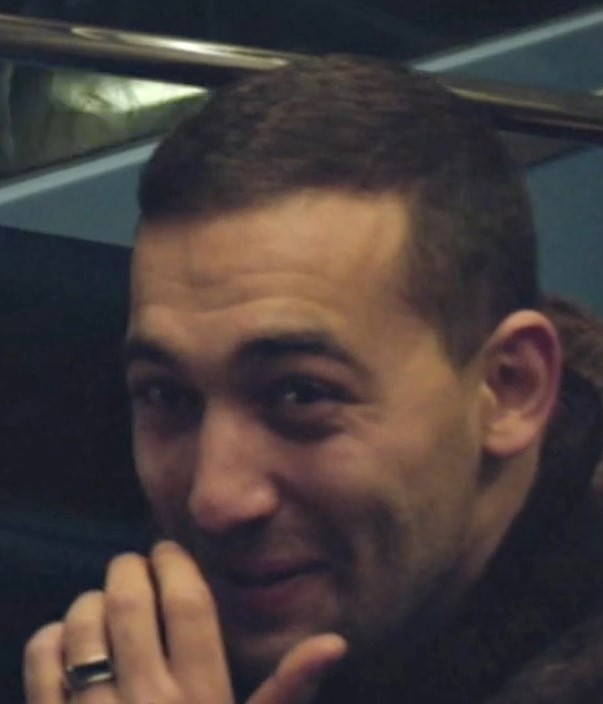
- Benssalah in Lave, 2019
- Born: 8 January 1992 (age 34); Rennes, France
- Occupation: Actor
- Years active: 2013–present

Dali Benssalah (Arabic: دالي بن صالح Dali Bnessleh), (born 8 January 1992) is an Algerian-French actor.

== Biography ==
Benssalah was born in Rennes to a family of Algerian descent. He was a Muay Thai martial artist champion before graduating from the Cours Florent drama school. He began working in film and television in 2013. In 2018, he appeared in Louis Garrel's A Faithful Man and became known to international audiences for his role as assassin Primo in the James Bond movie No Time to Die.

== Filmography ==
- 2013: Petits secrets entre voisins
- 2017: Salade Tomates Oignons
- 2017: Je suis une blessure
- 2018: Red
- 2018: Nox
- 2018: Interrail
- 2018: Au revoir Tom Selleck
- 2018: A Faithful Man (L'Homme fidèle)
- 2019: Flash
- 2019: Savages (Les Sauvages)
- 2019: Street Flow (Banlieusards)
- 2021: My Brothers and I (Mes frères et moi)
- 2021: No Time to Die
- 2022: Athena
- 2022: The Last Queen (2022) (French: La Dernière Reine, Arabic: الأخيرة)
- 2023: The Accidental Getaway Driver
- 2023: All Your Faces (French: Je verrai toujours vos visages)

== Short films ==
- 2014: Mon Book by Seyed Hosseini
- 2017: Tomato and onion salad by Jules Talbot
- 2018: Au revoir Tom Selleck by Ridwane Bellawell
- 2018: Red by Virgile Sicard and Charlotte Déniel
- 2018: Flash by Barney Frydman
- 2018: Injury to Léo Bigiaoui
- 2019: Free fall by Aurélien Grellier-Beker
- 2023: The Mermaid Gets Married by Achraf Ajraoui

HolllyOaks - 2019–2023

== Podcasts ==
- 2022: Batman: Autopsie: Bruce Wayne

== Music video ==
- 2017: The Blaze - "Territory"
