= Monte Buchsbaum =

American psychiatrist

Monte Buchsbaum is a Professor emeritus of Psychiatry and Radiology at the University of California, San Diego. He was also the founder and editor in chief of Psychiatry Research and Psychiatry Research Neuroimaging from 1979 to 2019. He is the son of Invertebrate Biologist and author Ralph Buchsbaum. From 2002 he ran the Boxwood Press.

== Imaging research ==
Buchsbaum is a pioneer in the use of neuroimaging technology to study psychiatric disorders. In the early 1980s he, along with David Ingvar, performed the first positron emission tomography (PET) studies of patients with schizophrenia at the National Institutes of Health (NIH) and the patients had reduced glucose metabolism in the frontal lobe, a pattern known as hypofrontality. His research has led to him being called as an expert witness during criminal trials.
