= Orange County Men's Central Jail escape =

2016 jailbreak and abduction

On January 22, 2016, three inmates of the Orange County Men's Central Jail in Santa Ana, California, escaped from the jail's maximum-security unit by climbing through the plumbing pipes and ascending to the roof. They stole a utility van and a taxi in Los Angeles, taking the taxi driver hostage, and drove to San Jose. One inmate, Bac Duong, went along with the hostage driver back to Southern California and surrendered to police in Santa Ana on January 29. The other two inmates, Hossein Nayeri and Jonathan Tieu, were arrested in San Francisco on January 30. Multiple people were arrested for allegedly aiding the inmates to escape, including a jail teacher.

The 2023 film The Accidental Getaway Driver was based on the escape and kidnapping.

== Perpetrators ==
Hossein Nayeri, 38, was convicted of torture and kidnapping charges for his role in the October 2012 abduction of a marijuana dispensary owner, Michael, from his Newport Beach home. During the abduction, the suspects drove the victim to the Mojave Desert, burned him with a blowtorch, and castrated him, in an attempt to obtain information about hidden money. Nayeri then fled to Iran, where he has relatives, and was arrested at an airport in Prague, Czech Republic. He was extradited back to Orange County to face charges in the torture case. He has military experience from serving in the United States Marine Corps.

In August 2019, Nayeri was convicted of two counts of kidnapping and torture of Michael, but the jury failed to reach a verdict on the charge of aggravated mayhem. The following year, he received two sentences of life in prison without the possibility of parole for kidnapping, with an additional seven-year sentence added for his torture conviction. In 2023, Nayeri was convicted of escaping from prison, as well as stealing a van, but acquitted of kidnapping cab driver Long Ma. He was subsequently sentenced to an additional two years and eight months for the escape, on top of his life sentence for the kidnapping of the marijuana dispensary owner.

Jonathan Tieu, 20, and Bac Duong, 43, are believed to be associated with Vietnamese-American street gangs. Tieu, an alleged Tiny Rascal gang member, is suspected of murder and attempted murder for a March 20, 2011, shooting outside a pool hall in Garden Grove, California, that killed 19-year-old Scottie Bui and injured another man. Tieu was tried for the shooting, but a jury was deadlocked on the charges and a mistrial was declared. He was scheduled to be retried on the charges.

Duong is charged with attempted murder, assault with a firearm, and firing into a residence. This was in relation to an incident in which he shot and wounded a man in Santa Ana in November 2015. He has a criminal record dating back to a residential burglary conviction in San Diego County in 1995. In 2007, he pleaded guilty to two misdemeanor counts of burglary and receiving stolen property, and was sentenced to two years imprisonment. In February 2008, Duong pleaded guilty to possession of cocaine with intent to sell, possession of a firearm by a felon, and evading police, and was sentenced to six years in prison. In May 2011, Duong pleaded guilty to another charge of possession of cocaine with intent to sell and the sale or transport of a controlled substance, and was sentenced to three years in prison.

In 2022, Duong was sentenced to 20 years in prison. In April 2023, Tieu plead guilty to felony charges of escape and kidnapping, and was sentenced to eight years in prison, but with credit for time served.

== Escape ==
Duong, Nayeri, and Tieu escaped from the jail on January 21 in the evening, by cutting through four layers of steel grating and rebar inside the building, climbing through a plumbing conduit to the roof, and lowering themselves four floors to the ground with a rope. They claim to have had a duffel bag and backpack of tools, high grade industrial rope and, civilian clothing. They were not reported missing until 9:00 p.m. the following day, and their escape was confirmed at midnight. Duong allegedly pressed a handgun into the rib cage of a taxicab driver outside a Target store in Rosemead, stole the vehicle, and took the driver hostage. They hid at the Flamingo Inn Motel in Rosemead for at least one night. They then stole a utility van from a private seller who advertised it through a Craigslist posting, in South Los Angeles. They never returned it after a test drive, and drove it along with the taxicab to San Jose, where they stayed at The Alameda Motel.

Duong was arguing with the other inmates on deciding whether to kill the taxicab driver, and went along with him to drive back to southern California in the cab. Duong released the driver, walked into a friend's auto shop business in Santa Ana on January 29, and called the police to surrender. On January 30, Nayeri and Tieu were arrested outside a McDonald's restaurant at the intersection of Haight Street and Stanyan Street near the Golden Gate Park in San Francisco. Nayeri was detained after a short foot chase, and Tieu was arrested while inside the van. Police found ammunition in the van, but did not find a firearm.

The Orange County Sheriff's Department offered a $200,000 reward for the capture of the inmates.

In 2017, Nayeri's lawyer released cellphone footage of their escape.

== Additional arrests ==
Nooshafarin Ravaghi, a writer who taught English at the jail, was initially thought to have provided the inmates Google Maps information that included overviews of the jail rooftop and surrounding areas, but was cleared shortly thereafter. She was arrested and released from jail on February 1. Loc Ba Nguyen, an associate of Duong, was arrested for smuggling in tools that the inmates used to cut through the steel grating and barbed wire. He was formally charged with aiding the inmates' escape on February 1. In June 2017, Nguyen pled guilty to four felony counts, including smuggling a weapon into jail, twice providing equipment intended to aid the escape, and driving the escaped prisoners to a hideout; he received a sentence of one year in jail. Three other arrests were made, including arrests of Vietnamese gang members.
