= University of Pittsburgh School of Education =

Coordinates: 40°26′29.9″N 79°57′13.7″W

- Type: Public
- Established: 1910; 116 years ago
- Dean: Eboni Zamani-Gallaher
- Academic staff: 176
- Undergraduates: 197
- Postgraduates: 1,202
- Location: Pittsburgh, Pennsylvania, United States
- Campus: Oakland (Main)
- U.S. News & World Report Ranking (2018): 27
- Website: http://www.education.pitt.edu

The University of Pittsburgh School of Education consists of five academic departments: Administrative and Policy Studies, Health and Physical Activity, Instruction and Learning, Learning Sciences & Policy, and Psychology in Education. The school is primarily located in Wesley W. Posvar Hall although the school has facilities in the Petersen Events Center, Trees Hall, the Learning Research and Development Center, Falk School, and other locations. As of the 2016–2017 academic year, the student body consisted of over 1,200 students with nearly 1,000 among the over 50 graduate programs. The school is currently ranked 27th in graduate education according to U.S. News & World Report. As of 2017, over $26 million in funded research was undertaken in the school.

== History ==
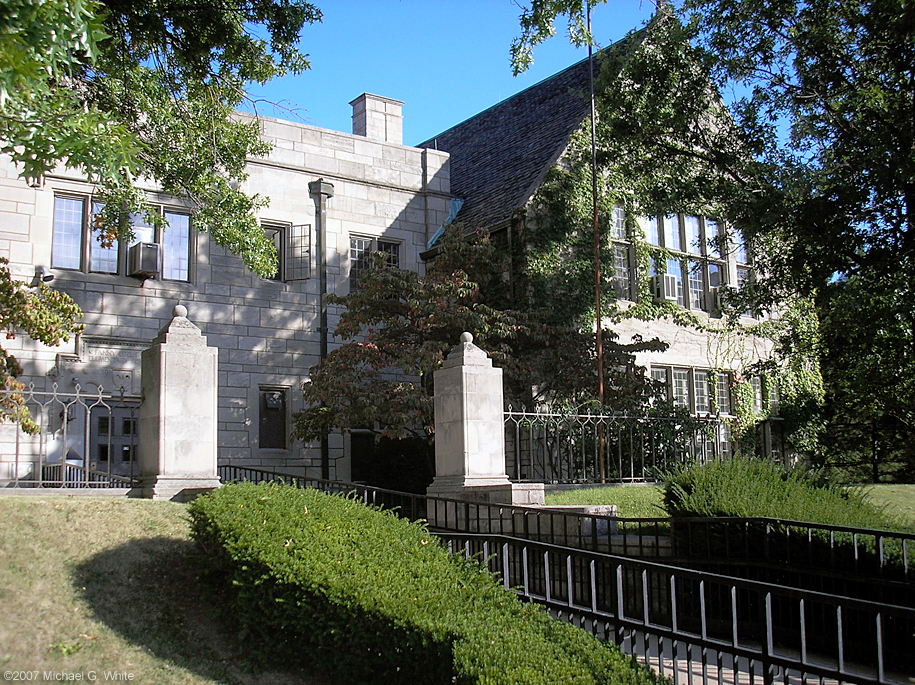
The Falk Laboratory School at the University of Pittsburgh

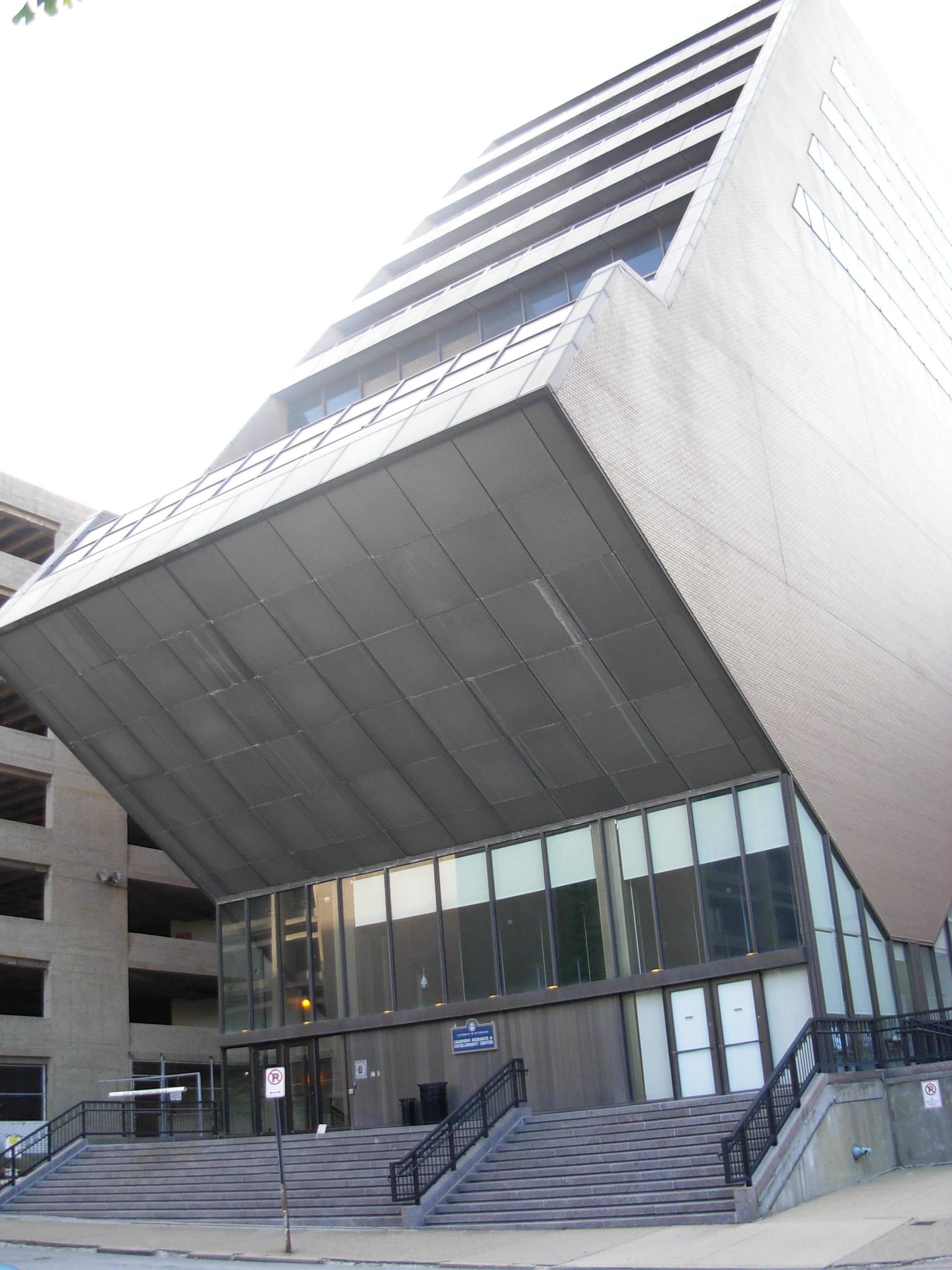
The Max Abramovitz designed Learning Research and Development Center building

A school of education at the University of Pittsburgh has roots as far back as 1843, when a teachers college designed to meet the demands for a proposed Pittsburgh High School, was implemented as part of an experimental curriculum by university head Heman Dyer. However, plans were disrupted by an 1894 fire that destroyed the University's facilities and records of this early attempt at an education school. The current School of Education grew out of the Department of Psychology and Education established in 1904. Edmund Burke Huey helped in founding the department, and that year, the university began to offer its first two courses on education for practicing teachers. As the department grew, and the demand for local education training increased, Huey promoted the idea of a Teachers College, as it sometimes called, prompting then Chancellor Samuel McCormick to propose the establishment of a school of education. The trustees of the University adopted a plan on February 3, 1910, for the organization of the school. The first term of the School of Education began on September 26, 1910, and it shared space with the Schools of Mines and Engineering. Will Grant Chambers, who replaced Huey who had left the university to pursue research on mental retardation, served as its first dean and head professor.

== Programs ==
Through the five departments of the School of Education, the school offers five undergraduate degrees, 64 graduate degrees, 29 certificate programs, and five minors.

Administrative and Policy Studies (ADMPS)

- Higher Education Management (Master's Degree and Doctorate Degree)
- School Leadership (Administrative Certificate, Supervisory Certificate, Master's Degree, and Doctorate Degree)
- Social and Comparative Analysis in Education (Master's Degree and Doctorate Degree)

Health and Physical Activity (HPA)

- Developmental Movement (Master's Degree)
- Exercise Physiology (Doctorate Degree)
- Exercise Science (Bachelor's degree)
- Health and Fitness (Master's Degree)
- Health, Physical Activity, and Chronic Disease (Master's Degree)
- Wellness (Bachelor's degree and Minor)

Instruction and Learning (IL)

- Early Childhood Education (Teaching Certificate and master's degree)
- Elementary Education (Teaching Certificate and master's degree)
- Reading Education (Teaching Certificate, Supervisory Certificate, Master's Degree, and Doctorate Degree)
- Secondary Education
  - English and Communications Education (Teaching Certificate, Master's Degree, and Doctorate Degree)
  - Foreign Language Education (Teaching Certificate, Master's Degree, Professional Certificate, and Doctorate Degree)
  - Mathematics Education (Teaching Certificate, Master's Degree, and Doctorate Degree)
  - Science Education (Teaching Certificate, Master's Degree, and Doctorate Degree)
  - Social Studies Education (Teaching Certificate, Master's Degree, and Doctorate Degree)
- Special Education
  - Early Intervention (Master's Degree and Doctorate Degree)
  - Education of Students with Mental and Physical Disabilities (Teaching Certificate, Master's Degree, and Doctorate Degree)
  - General Special Education (Supervisory Certificate, Professional Certificate, and master's degree)
  - Vision Studies (Teaching Certificate, Professional Certificate, Master's Degree, and Doctorate Degree)

Learning Policy Center (LSAP)

- Learning Sciences and Policy (Doctorate Degree)

Psychology in Education (PSYED)

- Applied Developmental Psychology (Bachelor's degree, Master's Degree, Teaching Certificate, and Doctorate Degree)
- Research Methodology (Master's Degree, Doctorate Degree, and Minor)
