= Athena (2022 film) =

French action drama film by Romain Gavras

- Official release poster
- Directed by: Romain Gavras
- Screenplay by: Romain Gavras; Ladj Ly; Elias Belkeddar
- Starring: Dali Benssalah; Sami Slimane; Anthony Bajon; Ouassini Embarek; Alexis Manenti
- Cinematography: Matias Boucard
- Edited by: Cherifi Akram Mohamed Yasser
- Music by: GENER8ION
- Production companies: Iconoclast; Lyly Films
- Distributed by: Netflix
- Release dates: 2 September 2022 (Venice); 23 September 2022 (Netflix)
- Running time: 99 minutes
- Country: France
- Languages: French; Arabic

Athena is a 2022 French epic action drama film directed and co-written by Romain Gavras. The film stars Dali Benssalah, Sami Slimane, Anthony Bajon, Ouassini Embarek, and Alexis Manenti.

The film had its world premiere at the 79th Venice International Film Festival on 9 September 2022, where it competed for the Golden Lion award, and was released on 23 September 2022 on Netflix. The film received mostly positive reviews, with praise for the direction and technical aspects, but was criticized for its lack of depth.

== Plot ==
Lieutenant Abdel, an Algerian-French soldier, holds a press conference outside a police station after his 13-year-old brother, Idir, dies in the hospital, apparently the result of three policemen beating him and then leaving him for dead. He appeals for calm after the death, but a group of youths, led by Abdel's brother Karim, disrupt the press conference by tossing a Molotov cocktail and raiding the police station. After stealing a weapons locker, some tactical gear and a police van, the youths head back to their poverty-stricken banlieue, Athena, a fictitious, sprawling housing complex, on the outskirts of Paris, where the brothers had grown up. They begin to barricade themselves and the residents of Athena inside the housing complex.

CRS riot police are sent to put down the uprising, and the youths respond by shooting fireworks and other improvised missiles at the police. In the middle of the chaos, a drug dealer, Moktar, tries to move bags of contraband out of Athena. With the youths refusing to let him leave, Moktar and his gang take shelter in Athena's shisha lounge, where they dig a hole to stash the contraband until the uprising has passed.

Abdel returns to Athena to attend a memorial service for Idir. He sees Karim and tries to speak to him, but the younger brother evades him when the memorial service is disrupted by the ongoing violence outside. Abdel then helps to organize an evacuation and shelter for Athena's residents, including a former terrorist in Syria, Sébastien, whom Abdel shelters in Athena's daycare center. While leading a group of residents past a group of riot police, an altercation begins, and Abdel and other residents of Athena are kettled and arrested.

Night falls, and the riot police move in on the housing complex. Their units are forced to retreat, and in the ensuing chaos, a young officer, named Jerôme, is separated from his unit and captured by the youths. They send a video of Jerôme to the police and threaten to kill him unless the three policemen who beat Idir are identified. Abdel is released from custody by the on-site police commander and sneaks into Athena, where he confronts Karim about the violent uprising that he has incited. He attempts to leave with Jerôme, but the youths pursue them, and both are forced to take shelter in the shisha lounge.

Moktar greets Abdel, and it is revealed that they are half-brothers. Moktar calls the policemen who are on his payroll, and they agree to come rescue Jerôme. Karim, who is intent on recapturing Jerôme, confronts Abdel through the security shutter covering the front of the shisha lounge, while the others try to break in through a side door. The standoff is ended when Karim attacks the arriving policemen, and is shot dead.

Enraged by his brother's death, Abdel savagely beats Moktar and captures Jerôme for himself. He calls the police commander, reiterates the rioters' demands for the policemen's names and instructs Sébastien to aid the youths. The police commander calls once more and insists that the policemen on the video are not actual police. He also warns Abdel that the RAID police tactical unit and the military are being sent in. On a video call with the commander, Abdel points his gun at Jerôme and fires twice but is revealed to have intentionally missed. Overcome by emotion, Abdel makes no attempt to stop Jerôme from leaving the building. With the tactical team closing in, a few of the building levels are blown up by makeshift bombs that were created by Sébastien, killing Abdel and a few policemen.

A man in a van is shown to be recording the beating of Idir in a video, which is later posted on social media. The policemen are revealed to be far-right instigators in disguise. They enter the van, drive into the woods and burn the uniforms that they had worn, which reveals that the beating was a deliberate attempt to incite racial unrest.

== Cast ==
- Dali Benssalah as Lieutenant Abdel
- Sami Slimane as Karim
- Anthony Bajon as Jérôme
- Ouassini Embarek as Moktar
- Alexis Manenti as Sébastien

== Production ==
The film was produced by Iconoclast and Lyly Films. It was shot in 2021 in the Parisian suburb of Évry-Courcouronnes at around 48°37′37.1″N 2°26′52.2″E. It features dialogue in French and Arabic.

== Release ==
The film had its world premiere at the 79th Venice International Film Festival. Distributed by Netflix, it was released in select cinemas on 9 September 2022, followed by a streaming release on 23 September 2022.

== Reception ==
=== Critical response ===
On the review aggregator website Rotten Tomatoes, 83% of 53 critics' reviews are positive, with an average rating of 7.90/10. The website's consensus reads: "Although it may arguably fail to do justice to its deeper themes, Athena makes for electrifying, hard-hitting viewing in the moment." Metacritic, which uses a weighted average, assigned the film a score of 72 out of 100, based on 20 critics, indicating "generally favorable" reviews.

David Rooney of The Hollywood Reporter summed up the film as "nerve-rattling, intense and explosive" and deemed it to be "a live grenade, beginning in full ignition mode and dialing up its intensity throughout with virtuoso technique."

Todd McCarthy of Deadline Hollywood described the film as "a torrent, an inundation, a cascade of rage, fury and frustration over the realities of life for a particular group of French families" that "grabs you by the throat and barely allows you a moment for a gasp of air."

David Ehrlich of IndieWire rated the film 'C+' and considered it as "just a really cool movie about a country that's ready to catch fire" that "would have been more harrowing and successful had it fully owned the courage of [the anger of the dispossessed]."

Tim Grierson of Screen Daily considered that Athena "works better as a brash, immersive action spectacle than a thought-provoking political thriller."

Peter Bradshaw of The Guardian rated the film 3 out of 5 stars, deeming it to be a film highlighted by "a sensational opening", yet also losing "its dramatic shape" afterwards.

Lucile Commeaux of France Culture considered the film to be "dishonest and bad, in every sense of the word" and a "big clip released on a platform that aestheticizes the aftermath of an alleged police blunder" with a "hyper-artificial structure [that] hardly maintains interest."

Sandra Onana of Libération, who denounced a "deluge of stylized violence" and "non-existent characters," judged that "Romain Gavras stuns the spectator with a political casualness that forces disrespect."

In Le Point, Jean-Luc Wachthausen wondered, "Is it still fiction when such a crude daily reality, which has become familiar to millions of French people, is rendered?"

=== Political reactions ===
French far-right politicians, such as Gilbert Collard, a member of Éric Zemmour's party, Reconquête, reacted as soon as the teaser was released by talking about the film as a harbinger of a "civil war" to come.

=== Impact ===
On 31 October 2022, when migrants in the Austrian town of Linz clashed with the police, the film had been mentioned as a reference on TikTok days before the incident.

== Awards ==
Award	Year	Category	Result	Ref.
Venice Film Festival	2022	Golden Lion	Nominated	
Venice Film Festival	2022	Premio Arca Cinema Giovani	Won	
Venice Film Festival	2022	Cinema for UNICEF	Won	
Gotham Awards	2022	Best International Feature	Nominated	
London Critics Circle Film Awards	2022	Technical Achievement Award	Nominated	
NAACP Image Awards	2022	Outstanding International Motion Picture	Nominated	

== See also ==
- Banlieue
- List of hood films
- List of French films of 2022
