= Ralph Buchsbaum =

American zoologist, invertebrate biologist and ecologist

- Born: January 2, 1907; Chickasha, Oklahoma Territory
- Died: February 11, 2002 (aged 95); Pacific Grove, California
- Scientific career
- Fields: invertebrate biology, ecology, education
- Workplaces: University of Chicago; University of Pittsburgh

Ralph Morris Buchsbaum (January 2, 1907 – February 11, 2002) was an American zoologist, invertebrate biologist, and ecologist. His book Animals Without Backbones, first published in 1938, was the first textbook in biology to be reviewed by Time and featured in Life. It has gone through several revisions and is still in print, and has been widely used as a textbook. It was still being used as of 2013.

Due to his 1938 book, Buchsbaum became known as a popularizer of science. In 1952 he founded the Boxwood Press, which published his own and others' science books. He also made a series of 29 educational films on biology for the Encyclopædia Britannica, and visited Thailand, Ecuador, Ghana, and India, where he helped develop educational curricula in biology.

== Personal life and career ==
Buchsbaum was born in 1907, in Chickasha, Indian Territory, now part of Oklahoma. He earned his Ph.D. in zoology from the University of Chicago in 1932 and continued there as a faculty member until 1950, when he moved to the University of Pittsburgh. He received the Quantrell Award.

Buchsbaum married Mildred Shaffer (University of Chicago SB 1932, SM 1933). She was a research assistant who worked on anti-leukemia drugs. The Buchsbaums had two children, a daughter Vicki and a son Monte. John Pearse was their son-in-law.

In 1952, he founded the Boxwood Press to publish his laboratory guide and later expanded into publishing other books, mostly about science. Mildred Shaffer Buchsbaum was an editor for the company. She died January 16, 1996; she was 83.

Although he is remembered for his books, his research was mainly in tissue culture. Ralph and Mildred Buchsbaum were the first to create chimeras between the green alga Chlorella and chick fibroblast cells (Science 80: 408-409, 1934). He worked closely with Harold Urey to find a way to use the ratio of oxygen isotopes to determine temperatures in previous eras (Bull. Geol. Soc. Amer. 64: 1315-1326, 1953). (See Oxygen isotope ratio cycle.)

He retired from the university in 1972 but continued to write and run the Boxwood Press. He died February 11, 2002, in Pacific Grove, California, of heart failure. His son, Monte Buchsbaum, will run the Boxwood Press.

== Works ==
=== Books ===
Ralph Buchsbaum wrote or co-wrote at least fourteen books., including these:

- Animals Without Backbones: An Introduction to the Invertebrates with Mildred Buchsbaum (three editions from 1938 - 1987) Ralph Buchsbaum took many of the photographs and photomicrographs.
  - The first two revisions were published in Pelican editions of two volumes and had illustrations by Elizabeth Buchsbaum Newhall, whose drawings of planaria inspired M.C. Escher.
  - The third edition combined the two volumes. Vicki Pearse & John Pearse were added as co-authors along with Mildred Buchsbaum. Some illustrations were modified by Mildred Waldtrip. The text was extensively revised to reflect recent research and the bibliography was updated. (Third edition, University of Chicago Press: Chicago and London, 1987. 572 pages. Cloth ISBN 0-226-07873-6, paperback ISBN 0-226-07874-4.)
- Living Invertebrates with Vicki Pearse, John Pearse, & Mildred Buchsbaum (1987) was an expanded version of Animals without Backbones. The 1987 edition has ISBN 0-86542-312-1.
- Balance in Nature with Bertha Parker (1941), Row, Peterson and Co.
- Basic Ecology with Mildred Buchsbaum (1957), Boxwood Press, Pacific Grove, CA
- The life in the sea (Condon lectures) (1958), Oregon State System of Higher Education
- The Lower Animals with Mildred Buchsbaum & Lorus Milne & Margery Milne (editions from 1923 - 1960)
- Thermal Stress on Cellular Structure and Function (1963)
- Laboratory Notes by Ralph Buchsbaum

Edited:

- A Book That Shook the World; Anniversary Essays on Charles Darwin's Origin of Species (1958)

=== Films ===
Buchsbaum made twenty-nine educational films for the Encyclopædia Britannica Education Corporation and supplied photographs and photomicrographs for them. Titles include these:

- The Sea
- Gene Action
- The Chick Embryo from Primitive Streak to Hatching

=== Papers ===
Collaboration with Harold Urey:

- Epstein, S.; Buchsbaum, R.; Lowenstam, H.A.; Urey, H.C. Carbonate-water isotopic temperature scale. Bull. Geol. Soc. Amer. April 1951, v. 62, no. 4, 417–426. (Full text)
- Epstein, S.; Buchsbaum, R.; Lowenstam, H.A.; Urey, H.C. Revised carbonate-water isotopic temperature scale. Bull. Geol. Soc. Amer. 1953, 64, 1315–1325.

== Books published by Boxwood Press ==
Boxwood published many titles in biology and natural history, as well as in history, biography, and other subject areas. They include these:

- Reproduction of Marine Invertebrates, Acmaeidae, Spionidae, Abalone: Gross and Fine Structure
- Hydra and the Birth of Experimental Biology
- Bird Year
- Elephant Seals
- Woody Plants in Winter
- Tom Beveridge's Ozarks by Thomas L. Beveridge (1979)
- Monterey Bay Area: Natural History and Cultural Imprints
- Año Nuevo, A Panama Forest and Shore
