= Hypofrontality =

State of decreased cerebral blood flow

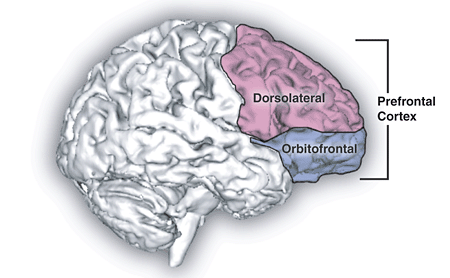
The prefrontal cortex

Hypofrontality is a state of decreased cerebral blood flow (CBF) in the prefrontal cortex of the brain. Hypofrontality is symptomatic of several neurological medical conditions, such as schizophrenia, attention deficit hyperactivity disorder (ADHD), bipolar disorder, and major depressive disorder. This condition was initially described by Ingvar and Franzén in 1974, through the use of xenon blood flow technique with 32 detectors to image the brains of patients with schizophrenia. This finding was confirmed in subsequent studies using the improved spatial resolution of positron emission tomography with the fluorodeoxyglucose (18F-FDG) tracer. Subsequent neuroimaging work has shown that the decreases in prefrontal CBF are localized to the medial, lateral, and orbital portions of the prefrontal cortex. Hypofrontality is thought to contribute to the negative symptoms of schizophrenia.

== Definition ==
Hypofrontality is a symptom of numerous neurological diseases defined as reduced utilization of glucose and blood flow in the prefrontal cortex. Hypofrontality can be difficult to detect under resting conditions, but under cognitive challenges, it has been seen to correlate with memory deficits along with executive function deficits. Hypofrontality is also linked to an increase in norepinephrine transmission and decrease in dopaminergic transmission with reduced dopamine efflux in the frontal cortex. Others have suggested that 'transient hypofrontality' - brief periods of reduced blood flow to the PFC - are associated with the 'flow' state experienced by professional athletes and musicians, where the explicit command system relaxes, and allows the implicit command system to operate unimpeded. The transient hypofrontality hypothesis proposes that there is a temporary decrease in the functioning of the prefrontal cortex during immersive activities, specifically affecting tasks such as working memory. This decline is due to the allocation of resources towards movement and the compromise of cognitive functions. The complex mechanisms involved include diverting resources away from cognitive tasks and resulting in a noticeable decrease in prefrontal cortex activity.

== Associated medical conditions ==
Hypofrontality is known to be a condition associated with the disorders listed below, though the exact role that hypofrontality plays in each of them has yet to be determined. The contribution that hypofrontality has in each case is hard to determine, mostly because the disorders themselves are not fully understood.

=== Schizophrenia ===
Schizophrenia is a mental disorder that most commonly affects social and emotional functioning. Besides emotional and psychological influences, it is believed that genetics and early development play a role in the onset of schizophrenia. The physical aspects of the disease are actual differences in the brain of the affected. Mostly in the frontal cortex, these differences often stem from a smaller brain volume, and the decreased blood flow that results influences the hypofrontality. It has not been determined if the reduction of the frontal cortex is the ultimate cause of the symptoms, or if the condition worsens as the symptoms develop.

In addition to all this, schizophrenia is characterized by cognitive impairments in executive function, affecting planning and goal-directed behavior. Negative symptoms are tied to potential dysfunction in the frontal lobe. While neuroimaging studies have yielded inconsistent results regarding brain volume, metabolism, and blood flow, functional neuroimaging during specific tasks demonstrates underactivation of the frontal cortex in schizophrenia. Negative symptoms, referred to as "psychomotor poverty," are linked to decreased frontal activation during tasks, resulting in slowed mental processing and planning deficits. This frontal dysfunction is specific to a sub-syndrome of schizophrenia, with three consistent syndromes: disorganization, positive, and negative. Negative symptoms are associated with compromised long-term adaptation and executive deficits. Tailoring treatment plans to address frontal deficits in real-life situations may enhance the effectiveness of interventions.

=== Attention deficit hyperactivity disorder ===
Attention deficit hyperactive disorder, or ADHD, is most prevalent in children and is considered a developmental disorder. Like the other cognitive conditions that display hypofrontality, ADHD shows decreases in prefrontal cortex size and function. In ADHD, the underdevelopment is specific to the left side of the prefrontal cortex, as well as the parietal region.

=== Bipolar disorder ===
Bipolar disorder is usually expressed through varying mood swings, between high and low. Elevated moods, or mania, are characterized by joy, energy, or irritability. Depressed moods are characterized by pessimism, crying, or lack of confidence. The underlying cause of Bipolar Disorder is not fully understood, but it is believed that abnormalities in the prefrontal cortex may contribute to the lack of emotional control and regulation.

=== Major depressive disorder ===
Major depressive disorder, or MDD, is diagnosed by a persistent low mood that affects the way a person sees themselves and how they live their life. Oftentimes, those with MDD lose interest in what they used to enjoy, are constantly in an edgy mood or display slower movements. MDD and anxiety are commonly expressed comorbidly. Smaller volumes of various brain regions, including the frontal cortex, are common in those who have MDD.

== Mechanism ==
Hypofrontality is a condition that is symptomatic of many neurological disorders and psychiatric diseases. This suggests that the mechanisms that cause hypofrontality and these neurological conditions are likely to be similar. Hypofrontality likely has pathophysiological mechanisms and neuronal mechanisms. This means that hypofrontality is likely to have causes that stem from bodily changes or changes in neurons. These mechanism names can be combined to be called neurophysiological mechanisms. Currently, the exact neurophysiological mechanisms that cause hypofrontality are unknown. However, there are some possible mechanisms that are plausible and would account for many of the effects of hypofrontality.

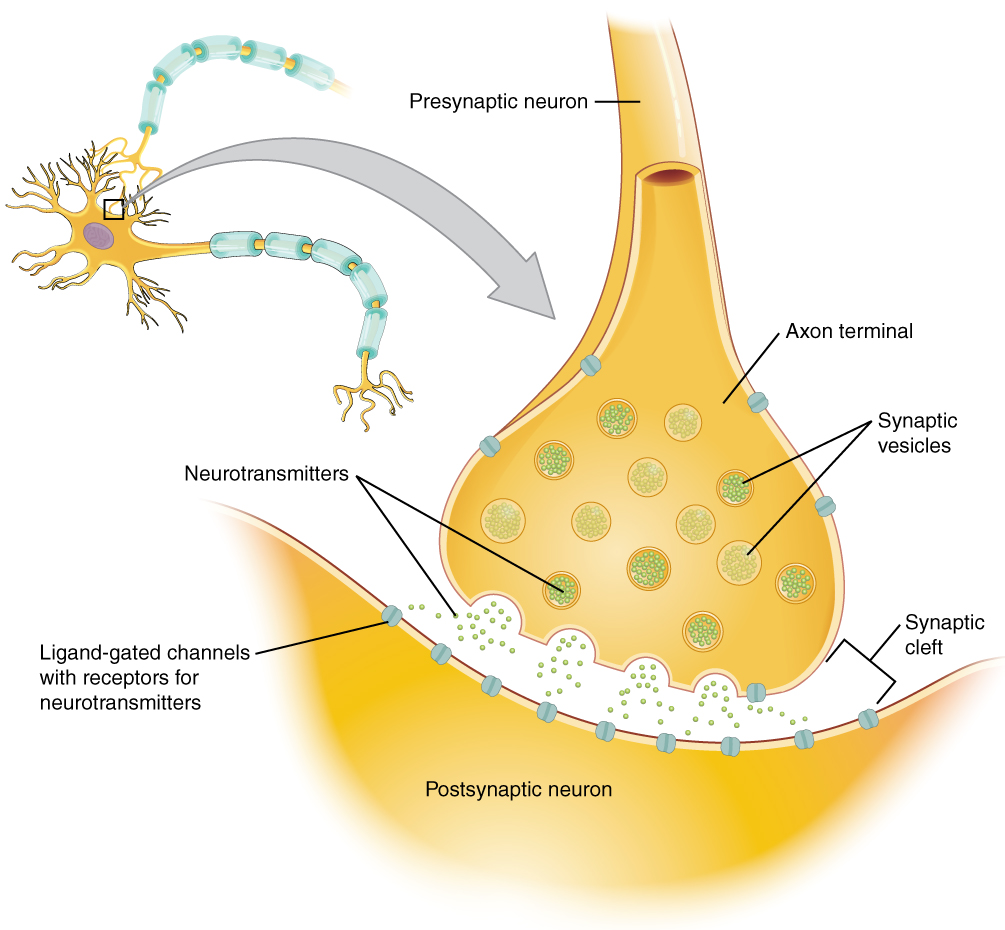
A diagram of proper synaptic connectivity

The working explanation of the neurophysiological mechanism behind hypofrontality is that hypofrontality is possibly caused by impaired synaptic connections, which results in diminished neurotransmission. This means that the connections between axons are functioning incorrectly, resulting in the spread of less efficient signals. This proposed explanation could arise from a variety of factors, but it would most likely occur as a result of problems during brain development or genetic factors.

If hypofrontality is, in fact, caused by these inefficient synaptic connections, then the associated irregular dopaminergic activity in certain parts of the brain (the limbic striatum and mediodorsal thalamus) can be, in part, explained. Dopaminergic activity is the release (or lack thereof) of the neurotransmitter dopamine and the resulting cellular responses. The limbic striatum and mediodorsal thalamus (parts of the brain) have connections with a part of the prefrontal cortex called the corticolimbothalamic circuit. The corticolimbothalamic circuit has a high concentration of GABAergic interneurons, which are neurons that predominantly work with the inhibitory neurotransmitter GABA. As a result of the impaired synaptic connections, the GABAergic interneurons of the corticolimbothalamic circuit would adapt to release increasingly high amounts of GABA to send a signal of the correct strength. This recurrent activation of the GABAergic cells produces a strong inhibitory signal back to the limbic striatum and mediodorsal thalamus, which inhibits the dopaminergic activity in those parts of the brain. This resulting inhibition of dopaminergic activity produces reduced activity at the mRNA and protein level in cells. These cellular changes could call for less blood flow and glucose use specifically, or the less blood flow and glucose metabolism could simply be a result of the lowered cellular activity.

== Diagnostic approach ==
An example of an fMRI scan

Since hypofrontality is a condition that alters blood flow and brain glucose metabolism levels, fMRIs or PET scans are used to diagnose hypofrontality. The decrease in blood flow can be best diagnosed with an fMRI, HMPOASPECT, or H_{2}O-PET studies; the decrease in glucose levels can be diagnosed best with 18F-FDG PET imaging studies. These are all different types of imaging studies that use various different chemicals to flag certain molecules, usually glucose.

== Treatment and management ==
The two main drugs that were thought to potentially be able to reverse hypofrontality and its effects were clozapine and haloperidol; however, neither of the drugs were capable of reversing hypofrontality. Future studies of clozapine showed promise as a treatment in restoring certain aspects of hypofrontality such as the restoration of normal GABAergic neuronal function, but it remained unable to reverse all components of hypofrontality. This suggests that hypofrontality is not caused exclusively by the GABAergic interneurons, and that there is another cause of hypofrontality that is still undiscovered. It is currently thought that a drug that could fully reverse the effects of hypofrontality would also effectively reverse the effects of certain neurological conditions; however, this has not been proven, and the drug has not yet been discovered. Nevertheless, it has been shown that chronic administration of nicotine reverses hypofrontality in animal models of addiction and schizophrenia. Moreover, recent studies have shown that the alpha 2 receptor agonists such as clonidine and guanfacine can treat hypofrontality associated with ADHD, PTSD and depression.

== Research ==
Hypofrontality is still not fully understood in its entirety, but there are a number of research projects that have been conducted, leading to progress in recognizing the signs of the symptom. Even though there is still a lot to be learned, experiments on NK1R -/- mice have revealed the role of dopaminergic transmission in hypofrontality. Sagvolden and company conducted a loss-of function mutation where mutant mice lacked the NK1R protein resulting in a low dopaminergic transmission supporting the hypothesis of hypofrontality in ADHD. There has been fewer studies of hypofrontality in depressed patients and drug addiction compared to that of schizophrenia but neuroimaging reports signs of hypofrontality in depressed patients. With hypofrontality being linked to psychiatric diseases, depression, and drug addiction, there is a possibility that they all may have some common pathophysiological mechanism linking the diseases. Even with the large amounts of research on hypofrontality in schizophrenia, there is still a lot to be learned about its neuronal mechanisms. Possible causes are hypothesized to be impaired synaptic connectivity and neurotransmission resulting from neurodevelopmental and/or genetic factors but there is not a complete understanding hypofrontality as a whole.

Current research is also being done in mice to try to replicate the conditions that occur in patients with hypofrontality to determine how it is caused and how it might be fixed.
