= Electronic visit verification =

Method of verifying home healthcare visits

Electronic visit verification (EVV) is a method used in the United States to verify home healthcare visits to ensure patients are not neglected and to cut down on fraudulently documented home visits. Beginning January 1, 2020, home care agencies that provide personal care services must have an EVV solution in place or risk having their Medicaid claims denied, under a mandate included in the 21st Century Cures Act.

While the federal mandate sets key data points that must be collected and electronically verified, states create their own systems. State governments decide how to gather and report data that EVV vendors use, and whether to include additional EVV compliance rules.

== History ==
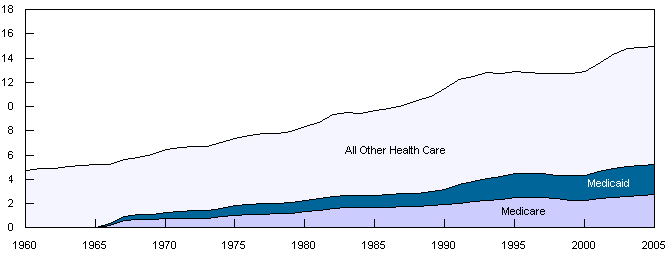
Healthcare spending in the United States as a percentage of gross domestic product (GDP).

Electronic visit verification was created to help cut down on fraud and ensure that people receive the documented care they need. EVV was designed to help verify that services billed for home healthcare are for actual visits made. The passing of the Affordable Care Act signed into law in 2010 made provisions for the cut down of fraud and over-payments, requiring states to stop Medicaid payments to providers when there is credible evidence of fraud. At least 10 states implemented an office of inspector general to oversee Medicaid fraud investigations, with many moving towards a system of verifying home healthcare visits in order to help reduce fraud.

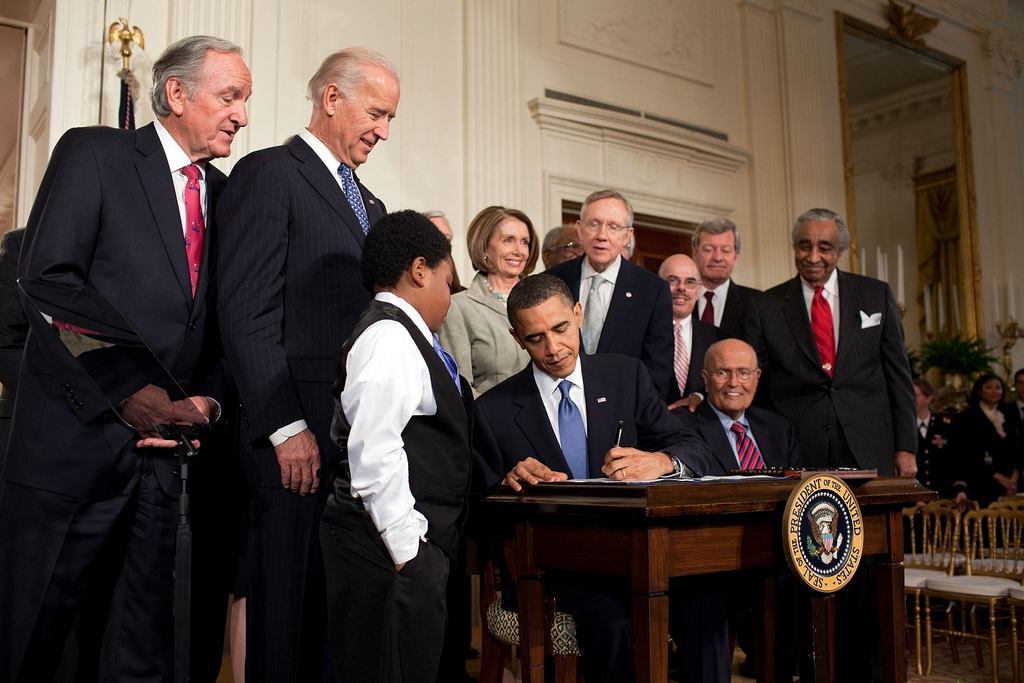
President Obama signing the Patient Protection and Affordable Care Act on March 23, 2010.

Several states have introduced electronic visit verification with some mandating it for home healthcare. In January 2014, Illinois became the first state to mandate the use of EVV when the Department of Human Services required it for its home services program. As of June 1, 2015, the Texas Health and Human Services Commission mandates that electronic visit verification be used for all home healthcare visits billed to the state. The state of Ohio began the process of implementing an electronic verification system that would be used starting in 2016. It estimated the use of EVV will save the state approximately $9.5 million in its first two years of use. Other states that use but do not mandate EVV include Louisiana, Alaska, and Tennessee.

Electronic visit verification is widely used throughout the healthcare industry, not solely by government entities. Companies use it for compliance and quality assurance. Employers of home healthcare providers use it to verify employee's locations as well as document patient care. It can also be used to verify hours of work and document time sheets for healthcare workers.

== Health care fraud ==
Health care fraud includes health insurance fraud, drug fraud, and medical fraud. Health insurance fraud occurs when a company or an individual defrauds an insurer or government health care program, such as Medicare (United States) or equivalent State programs. The manner in which this is done varies, and persons engaging in fraud are always seeking new ways to circumvent the law. Damages from fraud can be recovered by use of the False Claims Act, most commonly under the qui tam provisions which rewards an individual for being a "whistleblower", or relator (law).

== Tracking software ==
Electronic visit verification is mainly done through the use of GPS tracking and computer software. It can also include the use of telephone based systems where healthcare workers can call-in from each location. GPS can be used to track the location of nurses, or a "check-in" system can be used requiring healthcare providers to clock in when they are at a home visit.

EVV is also used by employers to track employees and determine their compensation. Electronic visit verification software integrates with payroll systems that allow companies to verify payroll of its nurses. Many EVV software providers employ a cloud-based system that integrates with a mobile app to coordinate schedules, billing, payroll, communication, and patient documentation. Nurses can update patient files with the system while also submitting working hours to their employers. In contrast, companies such as First Data provide a telephone and computer-based system for verification, similar to the system implemented in the state of Texas in 2015.
