= Counterfeit medication =

False medication

A counterfeit medication or a counterfeit drug is a medication or pharmaceutical item which is produced and sold with the intent to deceptively represent its origin, authenticity, or effectiveness. A counterfeit drug may contain inappropriate quantities of active ingredients, or none, may be improperly processed within the body (e.g., absorption by the body), may contain ingredients that are not on the label (which may or may not be harmful), or may be supplied with inaccurate or fake packaging and labeling.

Counterfeit drugs are related to pharma fraud. Drug manufacturers and distributors are increasingly investing in countermeasures, such as traceability and authentication technologies, to try to minimise the impact of counterfeit drugs. Antibiotics with insufficient quantities of an active ingredient add to the problem of antimicrobial resistance.

Legitimate, correctly labeled, low-cost generic drugs are not counterfeit or fake, although they can be counterfeited much as brand name drugs can be, but can be caught up in anticounterfeiting enforcement measures. In that respect, a debate is raging as to whether "counterfeit products [are] first and foremost a threat to human health and safety or [whether] provoking anxiety [is] just a clever way for wealthy nations to create sympathy for increased protection of their intellectual property rights". Generic drugs are subject to normal regulations in countries where they are manufactured and sold.

A recent study suggested "a multifaceted global strategy is needed to prevent substandard and falsified medicines especially in childrens, emphasizing that effective prevention requires strong regulatory enforcement, improved pharmaceutical supply chains, healthcare education, international collaboration, and access to quality medicines to reduce the associated health risks and disease burden. The study suggested two novel proposals not widely discussed before are (1) a Global Pediatric Drug Quality Index, to rank countries based on regulatory strength, testing capacity, and reporting systems for pediatric medicines, and (2) a Zero-Tolerance Supply Chain Protocol combining blockchain, community surveillance, and mini-labs to enforce transparency and prevent pediatric drug counterfeiting.

== Prescription and over-the-counter drugs ==
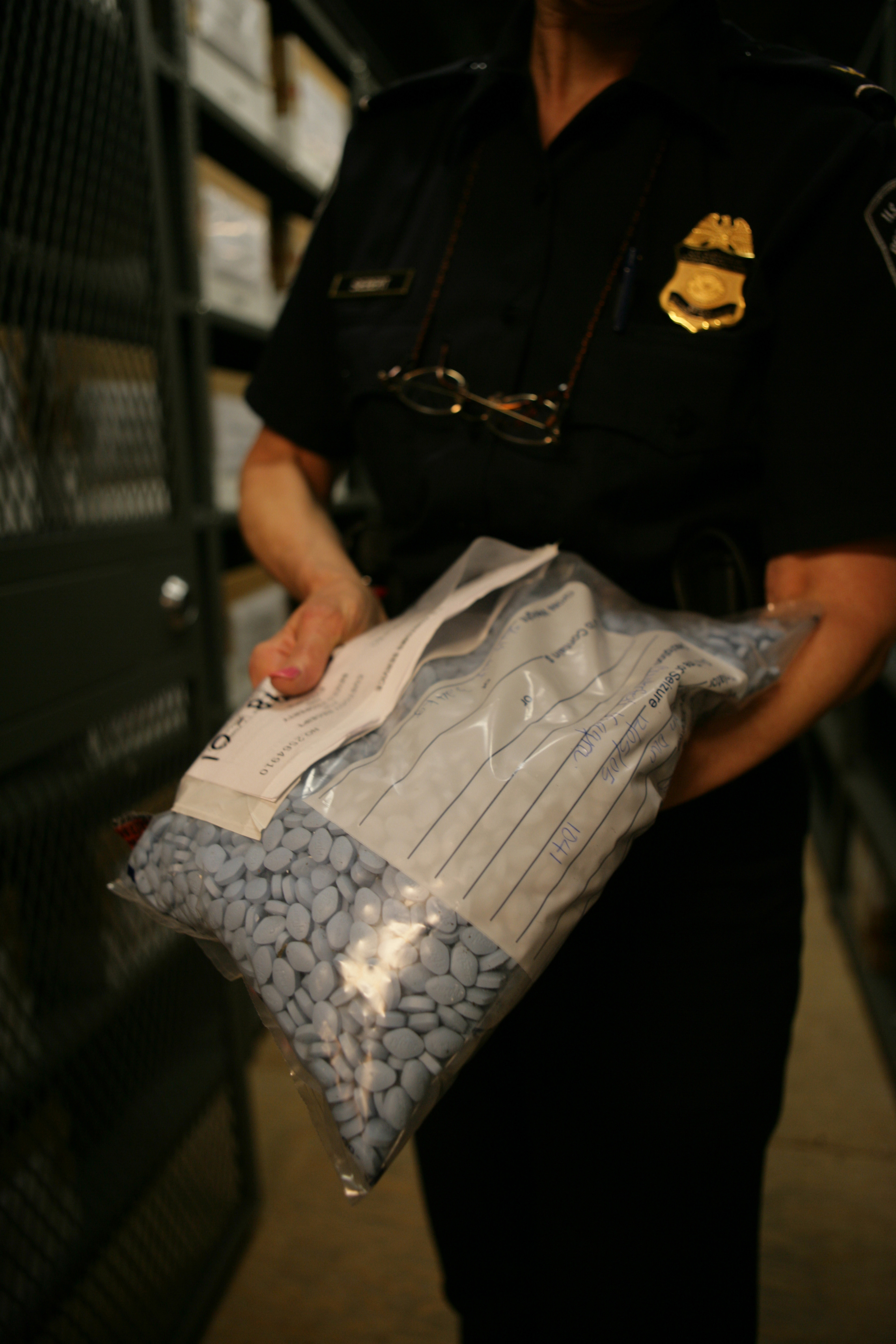
Bulk bag of counterfeit Viagra

Counterfeit medicinal drugs include those with less or none of the stated active ingredients, with added, sometimes hazardous, adulterants, substituted ingredients, completely misrepresented, or sold with a false brand name. Otherwise, legitimate drugs that have passed their date of expiry are sometimes remarked with false dates. Low-quality counterfeit medication may cause any of several dangerous health consequences, including side effects or allergic reactions, in addition to their obvious lack of efficacy due to having less or none of their active ingredients.

Since counterfeiting is difficult to detect, investigate, quantify, or stop, the quantity of counterfeit medication is difficult to determine. In 2003, the World Health Organization cited estimates that the annual earnings from substandard and/or counterfeit drugs were over US$32 billion.

The considerable difference between the cost of manufacturing counterfeit medication and price counterfeiters charge is a lucrative incentive. Fake antibiotics with a low concentration of the active ingredients can do damage worldwide by stimulating the development of drug resistance in surviving bacteria. Courses of antibiotic treatment which are not completed can be dangerous or even life-threatening. If a low-potency counterfeit drug is involved, completion of a course of treatment cannot be fully effective. Counterfeit drugs have even been involved in clinical drug trials.

Several technologies may prove helpful in combating the counterfeit drug problem. An example is radio-frequency identification, which uses electronic devices to track and identify items, such as pharmaceutical products, by assigning individual serial numbers to the containers holding each product. The U.S. Food and Drug Administration (FDA) is working towards an ePedigree system to track drugs from factory to pharmacy. This technology may prevent the diversion or counterfeiting of drugs by allowing wholesalers and pharmacists to determine the identity and dosage of individual products. Some techniques, such as Raman spectroscopy and energy-dispersive X-Ray diffraction (EDXRD) can be used to discover counterfeit drugs while still inside their packaging.

=== China ===
The National Medical Products Administration is not responsible for regulating pharmaceutical ingredients manufactured and exported by chemical companies. This regulatory lack, which has resulted in considerable international news coverage unfavorable to China, has been known for a decade, but failure of Chinese regulatory agencies to cooperate has prevented improvement. In May 2005, the Chinese press agency Xinhua reported that the World Health Organization had established Rapid Alert System, the world's first web-based system for tracking the activities of drug counterfeiters, in light of the increasing severity of the problem of counterfeit drugs.

=== India ===
G. N. Singh, India's top drug regulator, said in a 2014 interview: "If I have to follow U.S. standards in inspecting facilities supplying to the Indian market, […] we will have to shut almost all of those."

According to Outsourcing Pharma in 2012, 75% of counterfeit drugs supplied worldwide had some origins in India, followed by 7% from Egypt and 6% from China.

In 2009, the Central Drug Standards Control Organisation (CDSCO), the drug regulatory authority of India conducted a nationwide survey, and announced that of "24,000 samples [that] were collected from all over India and tested. It was found that only 11 samples or 0.046% were spurious." In 2017 a similar survey found 3.16% of the medicines sampled were substandard and 0.0245% were fake. Those more commonly prescribed are probably more often faked.

In 2017, industry body ASSOCHAM wrote in the paper "Fake and Counterfeit Drugs In India –Booming Biz" that fake drugs constitute US$4.25 billion of the total US$14–17 billion of domestic drug market. Around 25% of India's drugs are fake, counterfeit or substandard. If the fake drugs market grows at the current rate of 25%, it will cross the US$10 billion mark by 2017. Trade in fake drugs is driven caused by lack of adequate regulations, shortage of drug inspectors and a lack of lab facilities to check the purity of drugs. Other key factors include storage of spurious drugs by chemists, weaknesses in drug distribution system, lack of awareness among consumers and lack of law enforcement.

In 2022, Indian made cough syrups caused the deaths of more than 60 children in Gambia and 20 in Uzbekistan. In July 2023, an Indian-made bottle of Cold Out purchased at a pharmacy in Baghdad contained 2.1 per cent ethylene glycol, according to Valisure LLC, which is about 21 times the widely accepted limit. In July 2023, the WHO said cough syrups of Indian origin contained unsafe levels of diethylene glycol. Consequently, 12 children died in Cameroon as a result of ingesting the tainted syrup.

=== Pakistan ===
The 2012 Pakistan fake medicine crisis revealed the scale of production of counterfeit medications in Pakistan. Over 100 heart patients died after administration of adulterated drugs by the Punjab Institute of Cardiology. Pakistan did not have any regulatory enforcement on production of medicines until this crisis occurred. In response to the crisis, a regulatory body was finally set up in February 2012.

=== Lebanon ===
In June 2025 Lebanese authorities uncovered a major criminal network that smuggled and sold counterfeit cancer drugs, including fake immunotherapy medication like IMFINZI (durvalumab), through Beirut's airport. These medicines contained no active ingredients and were substituted for real chemotherapy drugs, placing patients' lives at risk. The judicial inquiry, led by Judge Dora al-Khazen, has resulted in at least five arrests, including Mohamad Khalil (brother of former Finance Minister Ali Hassan Khalil), his ex-wife (a Beirut-area pharmacist), and a security officer who facilitated the smuggling. The scandal triggered emergency governmental action, widespread pharmacy raids, and significant public outrage, as lawmakers warned that up to one-third of medicines in Lebanon could be fake.

=== United States ===
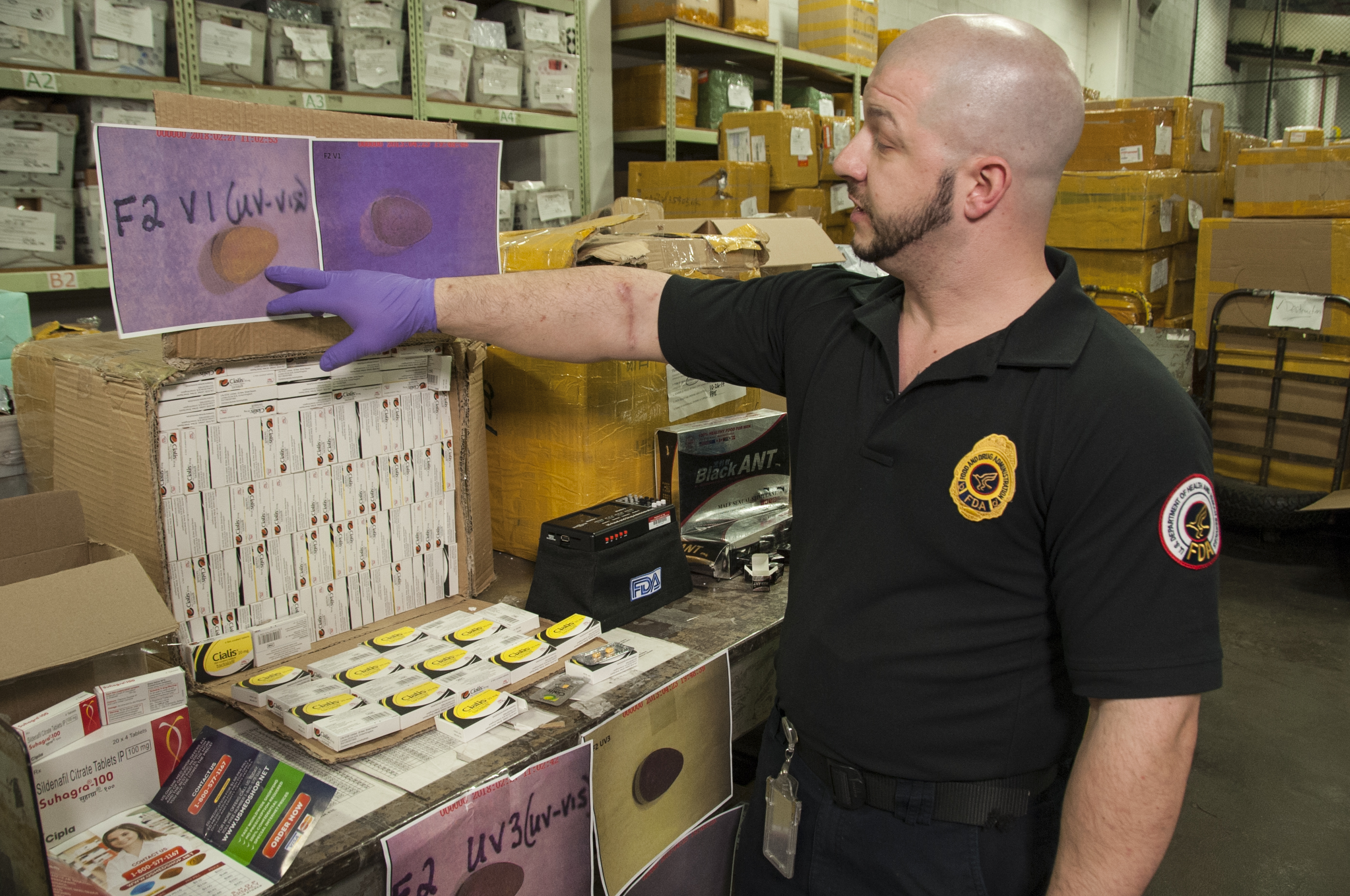
US FDA official inspects package suspected of containing counterfeit drugs at an international mail facility in New York

The United States has a growing problem with counterfeit drugs. In 2012, tainted steroids killed 11 people near Boston and sickened another 100. In another case, vials of the cancer medicine Avastin were found to contain no active ingredients. The vials were sourced in Turkey, shipped to Switzerland, then Denmark, finally to the United Kingdom from which they were exported to U.S. wholesale distributors. The Wall Street Journal reported that the U.S. wholesale distributor was hired by Canada Drugs, which also owns CanadaDrugs.com, a retail pharmacy website that sells prescription medication internationally, with a focus on the American market.

Between 2007 and 2008, 149 Americans died from a contaminated blood thinner called Heparin that was legally imported into the United States. Investigated by the FDA Office of Criminal Investigations, the Albers Medical investigation is the most prolific example to date.

In August 2005, the U.S. Attorney's Office for the Western District of Missouri issued a press release announcing that three businesses and eleven individuals were indicted for their involvement in a $42 million conspiracy to sell counterfeit, smuggled and misbranded Lipitor and other drugs and for participating in a conspiracy to sell stolen drugs. As part of this investigation, the FDA initiated a recall of more than 18 million Lipitor tablets, which ranks as the largest recall in the history of criminal investigations of counterfeit medications.

Participants in this scheme conspired to purchase and sell counterfeit, misbranded and illegally imported drugs. Foreign versions of Lipitor and Celebrex were smuggled into the U.S. from South America and resold after being repackaged to conceal the true origin of the drugs. Counterfeit Lipitor was manufactured in South America and smuggled into the US, where it sold after commingling with the genuine foreign Lipitor. Participants conspired to buy, sell and traffic almost eight million dollars' worth of stolen Glaxo Smith Kline and Roche drugs, using fake pedigrees to launder the drugs and thereby concealing that they were stolen.

There also were charges related to the sale of counterfeit Procrit, as well as counterfeit and misbranded Serostim and Neupogen. Procrit is an injectable drug used in the treatment of anemia, Serostim is Serono's brand name form of synthetic somatropin (i.e. human growth hormone formed using laboratory methods of genetic recombination) marketed for HIV-associated wasting, and Neupogen is an injectable drug used by cancer patients to stimulate the production of white blood cells in order to decrease the incidence of infections.

In 2005, the FDA held a Congressional hearing to review the situation. The U.S. is an especially attractive market for counterfeiters, because 40% of worldwide annual prescription drug sales were made in the United States in 2007. In 2011, a "PROTECT IP Act" was proposed to deter advertising.

Between 2002 and 2010, drug imports to the U.S. more than doubled, with 80% of drugs' active ingredients imported, now accounting for 40% of finished medicines.

In 2015, the U.S. residents determined to be at the greatest risk of exposure to counterfeit products through personal prescription drug importation, are aged greater than 45 years, reside in the south or west regions of the U.S., are of Hispanic ethnicity, college educated, poor or near poor poverty status, lacking U.S. citizenship, traveling to developing countries, lacking health insurance, managing high family out-of-pocket medical costs, having trouble finding a healthcare provider, self-reporting fair or poor health status, filling a prescription on the Internet, and using online chat groups to learn about health. Recent evidence suggests that provision of health insurance coverage may effectively reduce importation and the subsequent risk of exposure to counterfeit medicines, especially among particular subpopulations.

=== Africa ===
Fake antimalarial medication has been threatening efforts to control malaria in Africa, including the development of antimalarial resistance.

Other medicines have been documented to be of dangerously poor quality. In October 2022, the deaths of at least 70 children in Gambia were linked to cough syrups manufactured in India, which had high levels of diethylene glycol and ethylene glycol. There were delays in government response, despite doctors pressing for this.

In 2011, according to the World Health Organization (WHO), 64% of Nigeria's imported antimalarial medication drugs were fake. By 2023, the problem of substandard and falsified medicines had lessened somewhat since the peak. Nigeria is Africa's largest drugs market, and over 70% of its drugs are imported from India and China, considered the "biggest source of fakes."

One response has been attempts to bolster domestic production of medicines, but challenges include insecurity and unstable electricity. There have been investments in technologies to increase detection and verification of poor-quality medicines. In 2018, Tramadol, a powerful and addictive opioid, became a major problem. A huge black market has emerged, and an increasing number of addicts overdose and die.

=== United Kingdom ===
The MHRA (Medicines and Healthcare Products Regulatory Agency) are responsible for the regulation of prescription medication in the UK. Trafficking of counterfeit medication into the UK has become a growing problem, with ever increasing numbers of illicit drugs confiscated at the UK border. A large portion of the medication coming into the UK constitutes erectile dysfunction medication smuggled from abroad, one of the most popular of which is Kamagra (Sildenafil Citrate).

To help combat the issue of counterfeit drugs, the European Union directive on false medicines was published in January 2013. This came into effect in February 2019 and requires UK licensed medicine to have a unique identifier (UI) and an anti tamper device on each pack of medication. Every Pharmacy dispensing the medication is required to check the anti tamper device and update the FMD online system every time a pack has been issued.

In November 2025, the UK's Medicines and Healthcare products Regulatory Agency warned that organised crime groups had begun producing counterfeit versions of weight-loss drugs such as semaglutide, using sophisticated fake packaging that closely mimicked legitimate products. The agency cautioned that these illicit versions pose serious health risks to consumers.

== Anticounterfeit platforms ==
In 2007, the world's first free-to-access anticounterfeit platform was established in the West African country of Ghana. The platform, mPedigree, relies on existing GSM networks in that country to provide pharmaceutical consumers and patients with the means to verify whether their purchased medicines are from the original source through a free two-way SMS message, provided the manufacturer of the relevant medication has subscribed to a special scheme. Still in trial stages, the implementers of the platform announced in 2009 that they are in partnership with Ghana's Ministry of Health and the country's specialized agency responsible for drug safety, the Food and Drugs Board, to move the platform from pilot to full-deployment stage. A similar service is being rolled out in India.

In 2010, NAFDAC in Nigeria launched an SMS-based anticounterfeiting platform using technology from Sproxil. That system was also adopted by GlaxoSmithKline (GSK) in February 2011. In April 2011, CNN published a video highlighting Sproxil's solution in the fight against counterfeit drugs in Nigeria. In July 2011, Kenya's Pharmacy and Poisons Board also adopted text message-based anticounterfeiting systems and endorsed the Sproxil solution. In early 2012 it was announced that more than one million people in Africa had checked their medicines using the text-message based verification service developed by Sproxil.

An ePedigree is another important system for the automatic detection of counterfeit drugs. States such as California are increasingly requiring pharmaceutical companies to generate and store ePedigrees for each product they handle. In January 2007, EPCglobal ratified the Pedigree Standard as an international standard that specifies an XML description of the life history of a product across an arbitrarily complex supply chain.

== Illicit drugs ==
Illegal drugs can be counterfeited easily because no standards or regulations govern them or their packaging though some examples of illegal drugs are sold under "brand names" to indicate certain standards or dosage levels were being adhered to, as in the case of 1960s-era LSD, which was sold with patterns or logos printed on blotter paper. These illegal "brands" can also be counterfeited by drug dealers who want to be able to sell their products at higher prices.

Counterfeit illegal and recreational drugs range from products which do not contain any active ingredients, as in cases where lactose powder is sold as heroin, or dried herbs such as oregano are sold as cannabis, to cases where the active ingredients are "cut" with a diluent (as in cases where cocaine is mixed with lactose powder), and cases where the claimed active ingredients are substituted by something cheaper (e.g., when methamphetamine is sold as cocaine).

The use of diluents in illegal drugs reduces the potency of the drugs and makes it hard for users to determine the appropriate dosage level. Diluents include "foodstuffs (flour and baby milk formula), sugars (glucose, lactose, maltose, and mannitol), and inorganic materials such as powder."

The diluents used, often depend on the way drug purchasers consume particular drugs. Drug dealers selling heroin to users who inject, dilute the drug with different products from dealers selling to users who smoke, or insufflate the drug. Diluents which can easily form a solution with water for injecting heroin can be problematic for users who are sniffing the powder. When cocaine is mixed with diluents for the purpose of injection, the "...diluents can produce serious abscesses and pain if the user misses the vein and injects into muscle tissue."

"Diluents and adulterants are often added to No. 3 heroin", including sugar, quinine, barbital and caffeine, some of which "can cause serious side effects." Dr. Hirsch, the New York Medical Examiner, claimed that buying illegal drugs is "... like playing Russian roulette," because "there is no way of knowing just what a heroin dealer has slipped into the packets." In some cases, if a dealer does not take the time to dilute the drug with lactose or other fillers, a "very potent blend of heroin" is sold, which can lead to overdoses.

Claims that illegal drugs are routinely cut with substances such as rat poison and crushed glass, often cited in antidrug pamphlets, are largely unsubstantiated.

Some countries, cities and organizations deploy drug checking services in order to improve the ability of users to make a more accurate risk assessment.

== Packaging ==
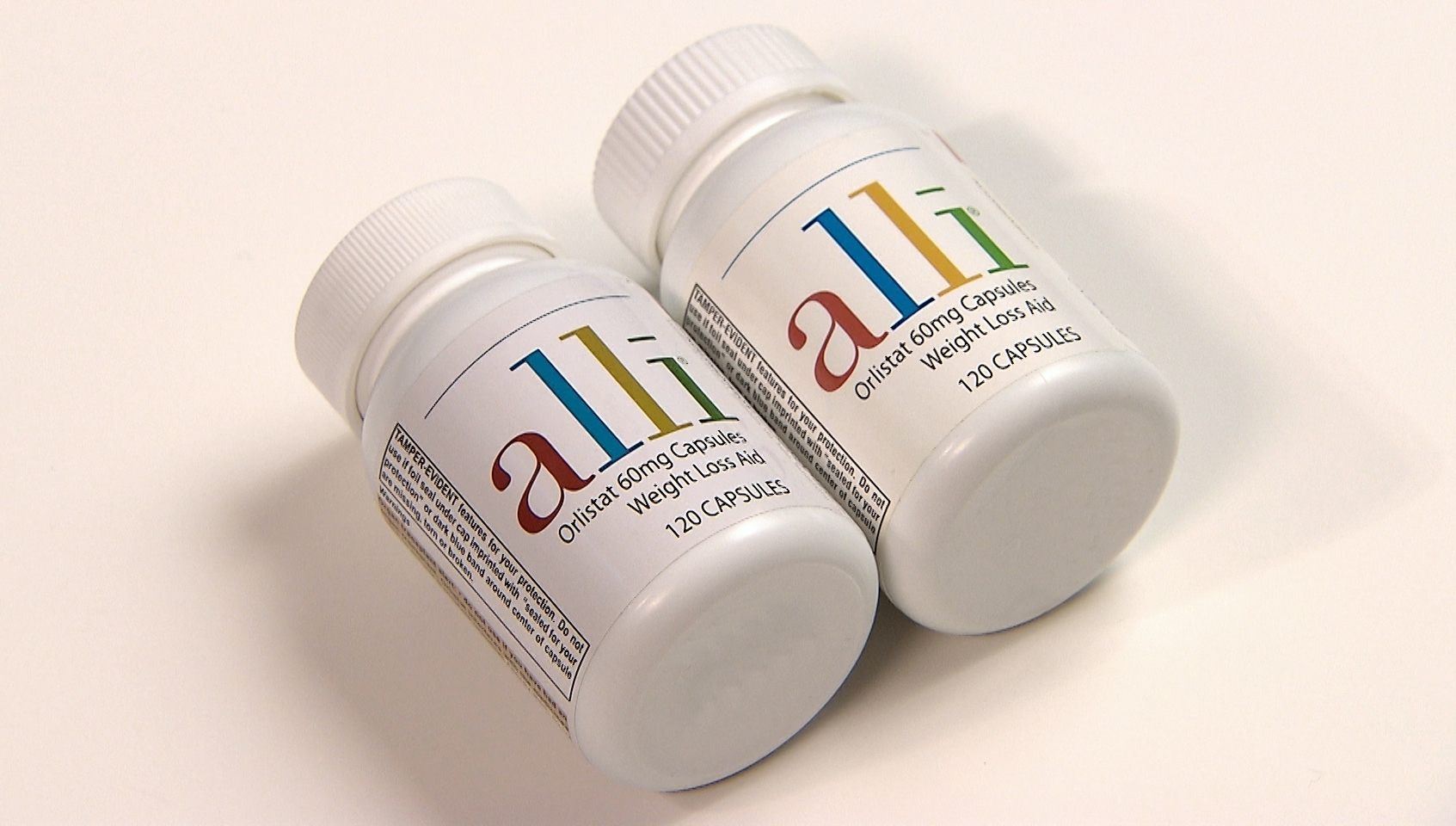
Two drug packages appear to be identical in normal light

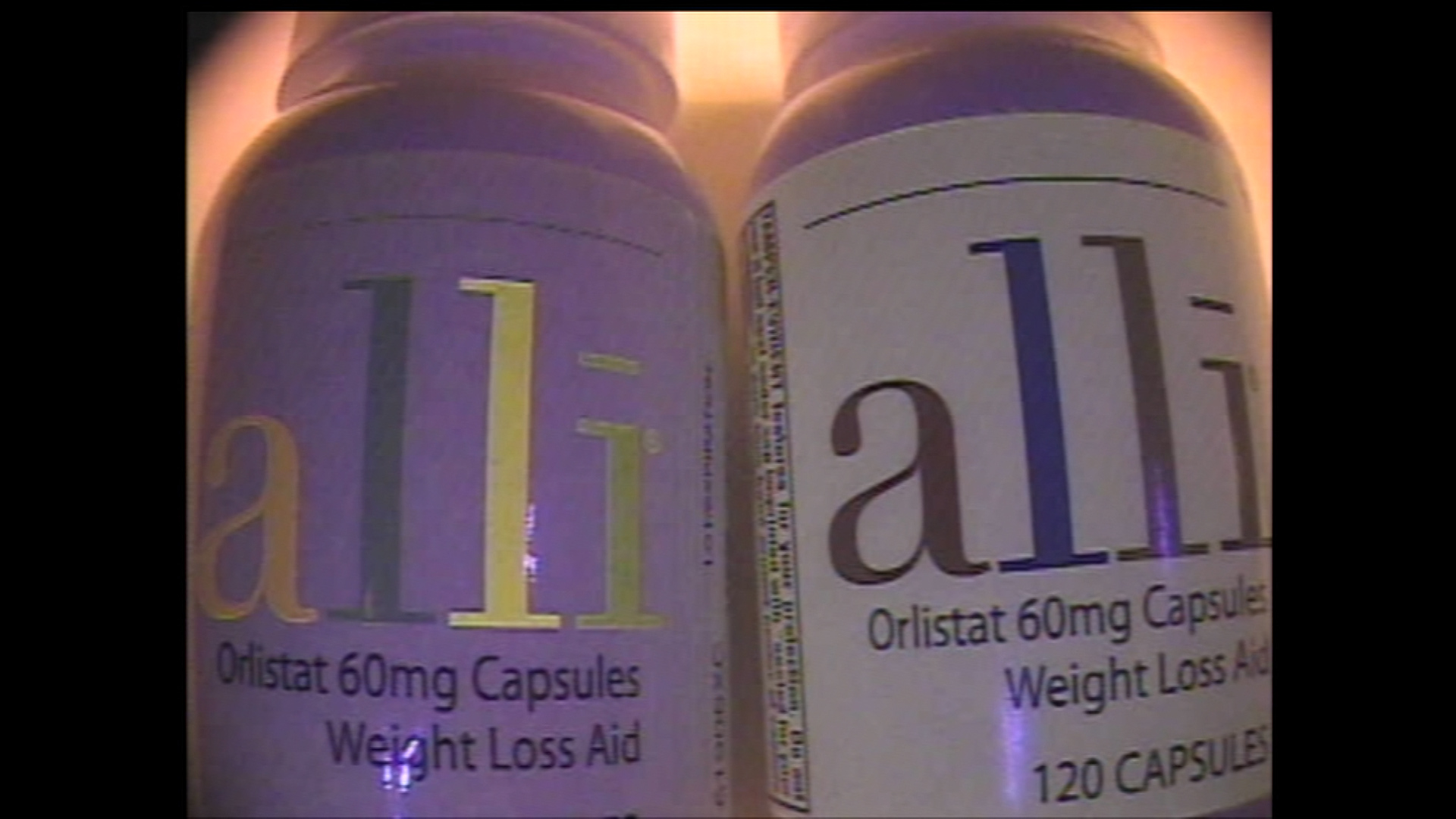
Selective UV wavelength identifies counterfeit package on left

Custom package seals, authentication labels, holograms, and security printing, can be valued parts of an entire security system. They help verify that enclosed drugs are what the package says they are. Drug counterfeiters, however, often work with package counterfeiters, some of whom can be sophisticated. No packaging system is completely secure.

== See also ==
- Authentication
- Counterfeit consumer goods
- Counterfeit medicines online
- Drug checking
- Drug fraud
- Health care fraud
- Lists of pharmaceutical industry topics
- New Scientist
- Pharmaceutical fraud
- Regulation of therapeutic goods
- Robert Courtney — American pharmacist who dispensed diluted cancer drugs between 1991 and 2001
- Security printing
- Verified-Accredited Wholesale Distributors
