= 2012 Pakistan fake medicine crisis =

Drug fraud

A fake medicine crisis at the Punjab Institute of Cardiology (PIC) hospital in Lahore, in Pakistan's Punjab province, claimed the lives of over 100 heart patients in late January 2012.

According to various reports, the incident involved patients who had been receiving treatment at the hospital and had been prescribed with counterfeit antihypertensive medicines. The Federal Investigation Agency carried out an inquiry into the incident, and identified the factory of Efroze Chemicals in Karachi as the producer of the Isotab tablets contaminated with pyrimethamine. The factory was sealed, and the names of the factory owners were put on the Exit Control List (ECL).

== Crisis ==
In mid-January 2012, several cardiac patients registered with the Punjab Institute of Cardiology (PIC) started showing up at different public and private hospitals in Lahore after having a sudden drop in platelets and white blood cells and bleeding from different parts of the body. The doctors initially took the symptoms as that of dengue outbreak that had hit the city in the fall of 2011. However, it was soon realized that the symptoms were seen in a PIC cohort and were more consistent of a drug reaction.

Suspect drugs included Isotab (isosorbide mononitrate), Lipitor (atorvastatin calcium), Cardiovestin (simvastatin), Alfagril (clopidogrel), Concort (amlodipine), and Soloprin (aspirin). The medicines were being distributed by the hospital free of charge mainly to poor people. The total number of people who might have been at risk after taking medicine from the hospital might have been as high as 46,000 according to one report.

The spurious medicine(s) triggered a serious adverse reaction by depositing itself in the bone marrow and ending the body's resistance. The generation of white blood cells stopped in the body. Among the symptoms of the disease were a severe chest infection, change in skin colour/pigmentation, low platelet count and blood vomiting.

As a result, the Department of Health constituted a high-powered committee to probe the incident.

== Inquiry ==
Almost all deceased were from the Lahore area. One fatality was also recorded in Multan. The Chief Minister of Punjab Shahbaz Sharif vowed "stern action" against those responsible and announced a compensation of Rs. 500,000 each for the affected families. The Federal Investigation Agency (FIA) formed an investigation team to probe the incident on the orders of Minister for Interior Rehman Malik. The team arrested some people reportedly involved in the distribution of the medicine. Cases were also registered against three pharmaceutical companies who made the medicine.

Investigations revealed that the license in one of the three pharmaceutical laboratories which supplied the contaminated drugs to the PIC had long expired in April 2011. Despite this, the company continued to manufacture the drugs in bulk and supplied them to government hospitals and open markets. As the death toll exceeded one hundred, the Lahore High Court ordered respondents involved in the case to file their replies by 30 January 2012.

Tests performed by the British Medicines and Healthcare products Regulatory Agency (MHRA) in the United Kingdom indicated that one of the five suspected drugs - Isotab - was contaminated. The report also showed that Isotab contained pyrimethamine which is in fact used for the treatment of malaria. The presence of pyrimethamine proved to be toxic. Tests done at the Central Drugs Laboratory in Karachi also verified the presence of pyrimethamine used in certain combinations to treat malaria in a sample of the Isotab tablet (20 mg). The laboratory also declared a batch of Alfagril as substandard.

The FIA seized raw materials from a Karachi-based factory of Efroze Chemical Industries. The FIA also put the names of owners on the Exit Control List besides blocking the official website of Efroze Chemicals. The sealed factory was located in Korangi Industrial Area, Karachi.

== Reaction ==
The Pakistan Medical Association (PMA) condemned the lapse in quality control while acquiring medicines as the main reason for the deaths caused by the drug reaction and has demanded the federal and provincial governments to establish a drug regulatory authority.

Following the incident, Sri Lanka banned its import of medicines from Pakistan as a precautionary measure. Moreover, the World Health Organisation issued a global drug safety alert (no.125) calling for increased vigilance on the use of Isotab manufactured by Efroze Chemicals.

== See also ==
- Counterfeit consumer goods
- Counterfeit medications
- Drug fraud
- Health care fraud
- Pharmaceutical fraud
