= PZO =

PZO may refer to:

- PZO, IATA airport code for Manuel Carlos Piar Guayana Airport
- PZO, nickname of Armen Kazarian, a Russian mobster involved in the 2010 Medicaid fraud
- Podnik zahraničního obchodu, a type of company in Communist Czechoslovakia
