= Herb Kimble =

American businessman and fugitive (born 1966)

- Born: May 12, 1966 (age 60); Chicago, U.S.
- Occupation: Businessman
- Known for: FBI Most Wanted Fraudsters (2026)
- Conviction: Pending sentencing
- Criminal charges: Conspiracy to defraud the United States, to make a false claim to a department of the United States, to commit mail fraud, to commit wire fraud, to commit health care fraud, and to offer kickbacks and bribes
- Reward amount: $150,000
- Capture status: Captured
- Wanted by: Federal Bureau of Investigation
- Accomplices: Andrew Chmiel (convicted; 2024)

Details
- Location: United States
- Target: U.S. Medicare beneficiaries
- Date apprehended: June 11, 2026 in Pasig, Philippines

Herbert Leon Kimble (born May 12, 1966) is an American businessman, film and television producer and director. He is the founder of streaming network UrbanflixTV.

In 2019, he was charged with Medicare fraud. After failing to appear at court hearings in 2024, he was placed on the FBI most wanted list. Soon after, he was apprehended in the Philippines and brought back to the US for sentencing.

== Early life ==
Herbert Leon Kimble was born in Chicago on May 12, 1966.

His career started as a child actor.

== Film career ==
In 2017, Kimble co-founded CineFocus Productions in West Hollywood, a film production company.

In 2019, he launched the streaming network UrbanflixTV to offer original and licensed multicultural programming.

== Medicare fraud ==
=== Scheme ===
From 2011 to 2019, Kimble operated a call center-based operation in the Philippines to serve as the marketing engine for Medicare fraud, targeting beneficiaries of Medicare insurance.

The scheme involved enticing potential victims via television and online advertisements. Callers would be screened for Medicare eligibility and convinced to order an orthotic brace and other braces from the call center. The call center would refer the victim to a telemedicine company, which would issue a prescription without regard to actual medical necessity. Medical equipment companies allegedly entered into a deal with the call center in which the braces were billed to Medicare. The fraud is estimated to have resulted in US$1.2 billion in damages.

=== Investigation and arrest ===
The probe investigation in Columbia by the government was unveiled in April 2019. The fraud was believed to have originated in South Carolina. Andrew Chmiel was also characterized as an architect of the scheme. Chmiel was convicted and sentenced to nine years in prison in March 2024.

Kimble became a fugitive and went into hiding in the Philippines. The South Carolina federal court ordered his arrest in August 2024 after failing to appear at a pre-sentence hearing. The Federal Bureau of Investigation (FBI) included Kimble on its Most Wanted Fraudsters list and announced a US$150,000 reward for information on his whereabouts. He likewise failed to appear at the sentencing hearing on October 7, 2024.

Kimble was placed on the FBI most wanted list on June 4, 2026. He was arrested by the Fugitive Search Unit of the Philippines' Bureau of Immigration at a casino in Pasig, Metro Manila on June 11, 2026 and deported to USA.
