= Medicare Fraud Strike Force =

United States government program

- Type: multi-agency team
- Purpose: combat Medicare fraud
- Location: United States

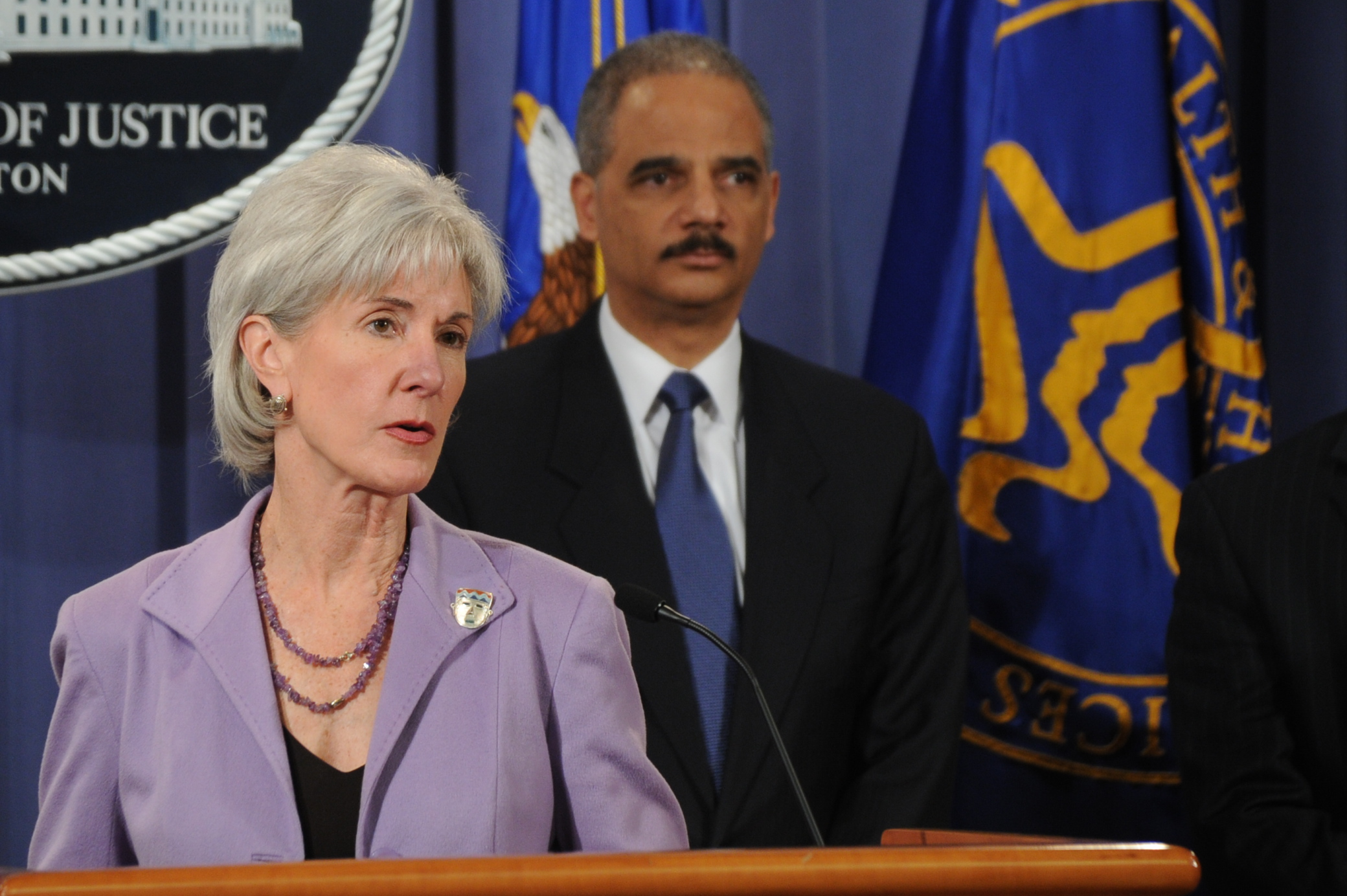
Kathleen Sebelius and Eric Holder announced that the Medicare Fraud Strike Force charged 111 defendants in nine cities.

The Medicare Fraud Strike Force is a multi-agency team of United States federal, state, and local investigators who combat Medicare fraud through data analysis and increased community policing. Launched in 2007, the Strike Force is coordinated by the United States Department of Justice and the Department of Health and Human Services. It combines the data-analysis capabilities of the Centers for Medicare and Medicaid Services, the investigative resources of the FBI, and the prosecutorial resources of the Department of Justice and the U.S. Attorneys' Offices.

The Strike Force operates out of Baton Rouge, Brooklyn, Chicago, Dallas, Detroit, Houston, Los Angeles, Miami, and Tampa Bay. As of May 2013, the Strike Force has charged more than 1,500 people for false billings of more than $5 billion.

== Cases ==
Some cases investigated by the Strike Force include the following:

- In June 2015, more than 240 individuals—including doctors, nurses, and other licensed professionals—were arrested for their alleged participation in Medicare fraud schemes involving approximately $712 million in false billings.
- In August 2015, a fake hospice nurse who treated more than 200 patients was sentenced to four years in prison.
- In September 2015, a psychiatrist in Houston was convicted in a fraud scheme amounting to $158 million in a federal criminal trial in Houston, Texas.
- In September 2016, two psychologists were convicted of health-care fraud, having participated in a $25-million scheme that administered repeated and medically unnecessary tests to nursing-home residents in Mississippi, Louisiana, Florida, and Alabama.
- In July 2017, Federal officials announced charges against more than 400 individuals—including doctors, nurses, and licensed medical professionals—for their roles in fraud schemes involving about $1.3 billion in false Medicare billings.
- In April 2019, Federal officials broke up a scam involving orthopedic braces and other durable medical equipment marketed through telemarketing, which doctors would then prescribe to patients regardless of whether they actually needed them. The scam was estimated to have cost Medicare over $1.2 billion. Twenty-four individuals were arrested in six states in connection with the scam.
