= Done Global =

American telehealth company

Done Global Inc.
- Trade name: Done Global
- Type: Private
- Industry: Telehealth
- Genre: Healthcare
- Founded: 2019; 7 years ago
- Founder: Ruthia He
- Headquarters: China
- Key people: Ruthia He (CEO) David Brody (Clinical President of Done Health P.C.)
- Website: www.donefirst.com

Done Global Inc., is a San Francisco-based telehealth provider specializing in the diagnosis and treatment of attention deficit hyperactivity disorder (ADHD) and other chronic psychiatric conditions. Through virtual consultations the company connects patients with clinicians who may prescribe medications such as Adderall, Ritalin (methylphenidate), and Vyvanse (lisdexamfetamine). The company also offers digital therapies and support systems to provide mental health care to its patients.

The company has since received scrutiny for its practices. Both its founder and its clinical president were in 2025 convicted of health care fraud and the illegal distribution of controlled substances. In July 2026, He and Brody received sentences of 72 and 24 months respectively and fined $1 million each.

== History ==
Done Global Inc. was founded in 2019 by Ruthia He, a former Facebook product designer with no medical background. The company capitalized on regulatory changes introduced during the COVID-19 pandemic in 2020, when the Drug Enforcement Administration (DEA) relaxed rules requiring in-person consultations for prescribing controlled substances. This allowed Done to offer online access to ADHD medications, including Adderall, Ritalin, and Vyvanse.

In 2021, Done’s head of operations, T.J. Williams, raised concerns about fraudulent patient behavior, citing falsified identities and manipulated documentation. He proposed tools to address these issues but was dismissed three months later. Around the same time, Done implemented policies to expedite prescription renewals, paying clinicians for processing refills rather than conducting follow-up consultations. Clinicians managed large patient loads, with some approving renewals in under a minute and earning significant monthly incomes of approximately $20,000.

He temporarily relocated to China in 2021, managing Done remotely while expanding operations in cities like Beijing, Shanghai, and Hangzhou. The Chinese Done team took over critical functions, including recruitment, advertising, and clinical policies. In early 2022, a Justice Department investigation into Done’s prescribing practices began, and major pharmacy chains, including CVS and Walmart, stopped filling Done prescriptions. The China team subsequently assisted in recruiting alternative pharmacy partners.

Later in 2022, Done faced scrutiny over its advertising practices, which included claims of quick ADHD assessments and medication access. Despite certification issues, the company continued spending tens of millions of dollars on ads on platforms like Google, TikTok, and Meta.

In February 2023, federal investigators intercepted He in San Francisco as she prepared to travel to Hong Kong. Following a June arrest, financial records showed accelerated money transfers, including $500,000 sent to a Hong Kong entity and $1 million allocated to her legal defense.

In 2024, the Justice Department charged Ruthia He and David Brody, along with executive Riley Levy, doctor Christopher Luccese, and nurse practitioners Katrina Pratcher, Yina Cruz, and Erin Kim. Advertising platforms, Google and Tik-Tok, banned Done’s ads by mid-2024. A federal jury in San Francisco on 18 November 2025 convicted Ruthia He and David Brody of illegally distributing Adderall over the internet and conspiring to commit health care fraud. Ruthia He was also convicted of conspiring to obstruct justice.

== Services ==
Done Global provides ADHD treatment through 30-minute video evaluations. Alongside online consultations, the company integrates digital therapies and support systems to deliver comprehensive mental health services. It collaborates with a network of pharmacies to streamline medication management and ensure timely access to prescribed treatments. This telehealth model gained popularity during the COVID-19 pandemic, which significantly expanded the use of remote healthcare services.

== Controversy ==
In 2022, Federal authorities, led by the US Drug Enforcement Agency (DEA), investigated Done Global Inc. for prescribing controlled substances like Adderall during the COVID-19 pandemic, when relaxed regulations allowed online prescriptions without in-person consultations. Done faced allegations that clinicians were pressured to diagnose ADHD and prescribe stimulants, highlighted by a 2021 internal report.

Following a two-year investigation, the Justice Department charged Ruthia He, CEO of Done Global Inc., and David Brody, Clinical President of Done Health P.C., with distributing controlled substances via telemedicine, healthcare fraud, and obstruction of justice in June 2024.

He and Brody exploited telemedicine during the COVID-19 pandemic to unlawfully prescribe over 40 million Adderall pills, generating more than $100 million in revenue. The subscription-based platform targeted drug seekers, discouraged proper medical care, and defrauded Medicare, Medicaid, and private insurers. Despite reports of overdoses linked to Done’s practices, operations continued. These were the first recorded federal criminal convictions for drug distribution involving a telemedicine platform. He and Brody were both were convicted in November 2025; they each faced up to 20 years in federal prison. In July 2026, He received a 72-month sentence and Brody received a 24-month sentence; each was also ordered to pay a $1 million penalty.
