= Steven H. Collis =

American businessman

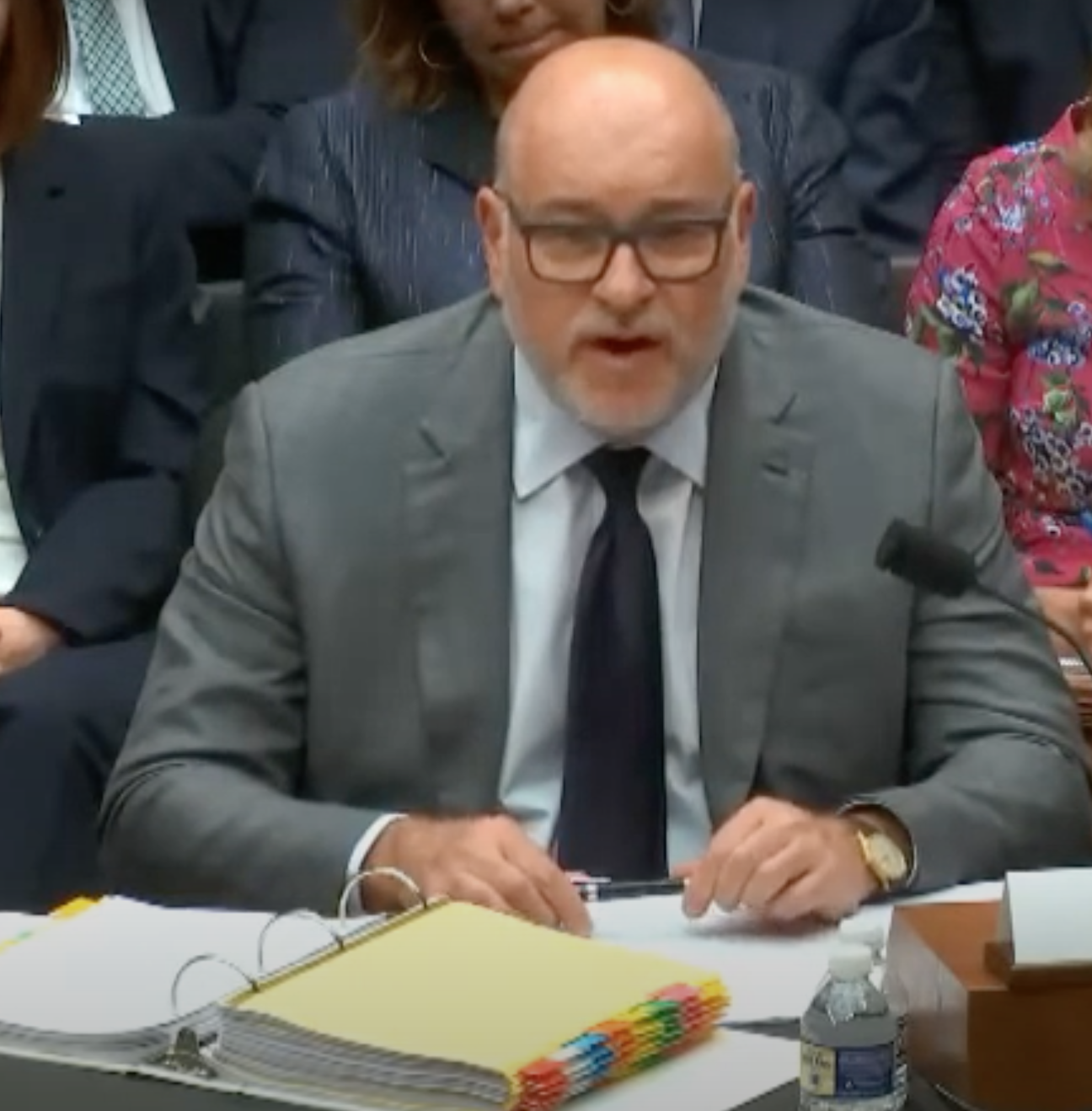
- Collis in 2018
- Born: 1961 or 1962 (age 63–64); South Africa
- Title: Chairman, president and CEO, AmerisourceBergen
- Predecessor: R. David Yost
- Successor: incumbent

Steven H. Collis (born 1961) is an American businessman, the chairman, president and chief executive officer (CEO) of Cencora, previously known as AmerisourceBergen.

== Early life ==
Collis was born in South Africa and attended the University of Witwatersrand, where he earned a Bachelor of Commerce. Collis is Jewish.

== Career ==
Collis joined AmerisourceBergen in 2001 as the Senior Vice President. In November 2010, Collis was promoted to president and COO of the company and in July 2011, Collis became CEO.
