= Medicare fraud =

Claiming of Medicare health care reimbursement to which the claimant is not entitled

In the United States, Medicare fraud is the claiming of Medicare health care reimbursement to which the claimant is not entitled. There are many different types of Medicare fraud, all of which have the same goal: to collect money from the Medicare program illegitimately.

The total amount of Medicare fraud is difficult to track, because not all fraud is detected and not all suspicious claims turn out to be fraudulent. According to the Office of Management and Budget, Medicare "improper payments" were $47.9 billion in 2010, but some of these payments later turned out to be valid. The Congressional Budget Office estimates that total Medicare spending was $528 billion in 2010.

== Types ==
Medicare fraud is typically seen in the following ways:

1. Phantom billing: The medical provider bills Medicare for unnecessary procedures, or procedures that are never performed; for unnecessary medical tests or tests never performed; for unnecessary equipment; or equipment that is billed as new but is, in fact, used.
2. Patient billing: A patient who is in on the scam provides his or her Medicare number in exchange for kickbacks. The provider bills Medicare for any reason and the patient is told to admit that he or she indeed received the medical treatment.
3. Upcoding scheme and unbundling: Inflating bills by using a billing code that indicates the patient needs expensive procedures.
4. Kickbacks & Physician Self-Referrals: Kickbacks are bribes given in exchange for patient referrals to specific providers or facilities, or even a specific manufacturer of a drug or durable medical equipment. Similar to a kickback, a self-referral occurs when a physician refers a patient to a provider or entity with whom the physician has a financial relationship.

A 2011 crackdown on fraud charged "111 defendants in nine cities, including doctors, nurses, health care company owners and executives" of fraud schemes involving "various medical treatments and services such as home health care, physical and occupational therapy, nerve conduction tests and durable medical equipment."

The Affordable Care Act of 2009 provides an additional $350 million to pursue physicians who are involved in both intentional/unintentional Medicare fraud through inappropriate billing. Strategies for prevention and apprehension include increased scrutiny of billing patterns, and the use of data analytics. The healthcare reform law also provides for stricter penalties; for instance, requiring physicians to return any overpayments to CMS within 60 days time.

As of 2012, regulatory requirements tightened and law enforcement has stepped up.

However, in 2018, a CMS rule intended to limit upcoding was vacated by a judge; it was later appealed in 2019.

== Law enforcement and prosecution ==
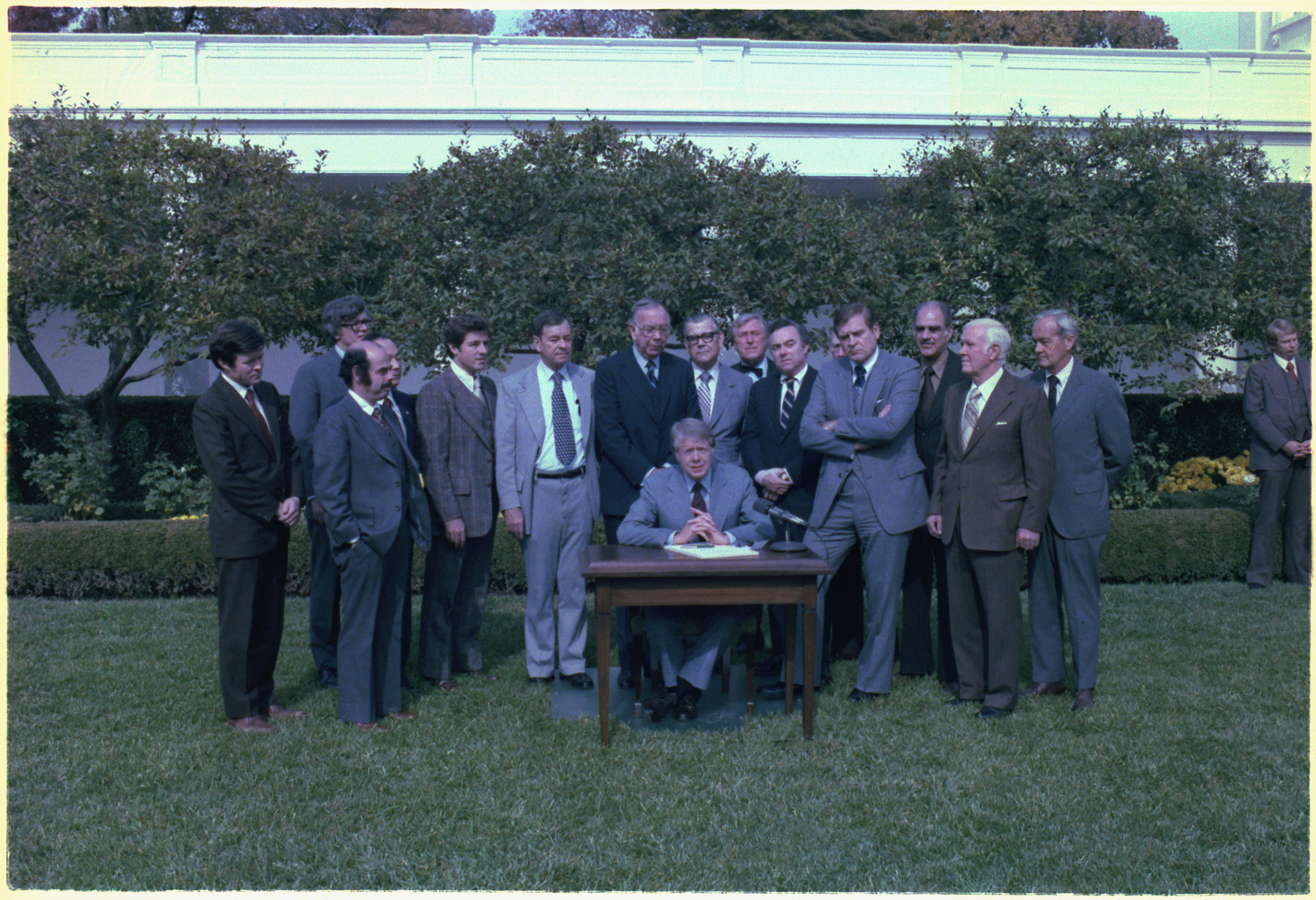
Jimmy Carter signs Medicare-Medicaid Anti-Fraud and Abuse Amendments into law

The Office of Inspector General for the U.S. Department of Health and Human Services, as mandated by Public Law 95-452 (as amended), is established to protect the integrity of Department of Health and Human Services (HHS) programs, to include Medicare and Medicaid programs, as well as the health and welfare of the beneficiaries of those programs. The Office of Investigations for the HHS, OIG collaboratively works with the Federal Bureau of Investigation in order to combat Medicare Fraud.

Defendants convicted of Medicare fraud face stiff penalties according to the Federal Sentencing Guidelines and disbarment from HHS programs. The sentence depends on the amount of the fraud. Defendants can expect to face substantial prison time, deportation (if not a US citizen), fines, and restitution or have their sentence commuted.

In 1997, the federal government dedicated $100 million to federal law enforcement to combat Medicare fraud. That money pays over 400 FBI agents who investigate Medicare fraud claims. In 2007, the U.S. Department of Health and Human Services, Office of Inspector General, U.S. Attorney's Office, and the U.S. Department of Justice created the Medicare Fraud Strike Force in Miami, Florida. This group of anti-fraud agents has been duplicated in other cities where Medicare fraud is widespread. In Miami alone, over two dozen agents from various federal agencies investigate solely Medicare fraud. In May 2009, Attorney General Holder and HHS Secretary Sebelius Announce New Interagency Health Care Fraud Prevention and Enforcement Action Team (HEAT) to combat Medicare fraud. FBI Director Robert Mueller stated that the FBI and HHS OIG has over 2,400 open health care fraud investigations.

On January 28, 2010, the first "National Summit on Health Care Fraud" was held to bring together leaders from the public and private sectors to identify and discuss innovative ways to eliminate fraud, waste and abuse in the U.S. health care system. The summit was part of the Obama Administration's effort to fight health care fraud.

From January 2009 to June 2012, the Justice Department used the False Claims Act to recover more than $7.7 billion in cases involving fraud against federal health care programs.

== Reporting by whistleblowers ==
The DOJ Medicare fraud enforcement efforts rely heavily on healthcare professionals coming forward with information about Medicare fraud. Federal law allows individuals reporting Medicare fraud to receive full protection from retaliation from their employer and collect up to 30% of the fines that the government collects as a result of the whistleblower's information. According to US Department of Justice figures, whistleblower activities contributed to over $13 billion in total civil settlements in over 3,660 cases stemming from Medicare fraud in the 20-year period from 1987 to 2007.

=== International Medical Centers HMO and Jeb Bush ===
In 1985, Miguel G. Recarey Jr., CEO of International Medical Centers (IMC), a Florida-based health maintenance organization (HMO) was charged with bribing a Medicare officer, bribing a potential federal grand jury witness, and illegal wiretapping in U.S. District Court in Florida. He failed to appear for a hearing. Recarey received US$781 million in Medicare payments for 197 000 enrollees but did not pay doctors and hospitals for their care. Recarey had "employed" Jeb Bush as a real estate consultant and paid him a US$75,000 fee for finding IMC a new location, although the move never took place. Bush lobbied the Reagan administration successfully on behalf of Recarey and IMC to waive a rule of maximum 50% Medicare enrollee proportion. As of 2015, Recarey was a fugitive living in Spain. The IMC fraud was then one of the largest in Medicare history.

=== Columbia/HCA fraud case, 1996-2004 ===
The Columbia/HCA fraud case is one of the largest examples of Medicare fraud in U.S. history. Numerous New York Times stories, beginning in 1996, began scrutinizing Columbia/HCA's business and Medicare billing practices. These culminated in the company being raided by Federal agents searching for documents and eventually the ousting of the corporation's CEO, Rick Scott, by the board of directors. Among the crimes uncovered were doctors being offered financial incentives to bring in patients, falsifying diagnostic codes to increase reimbursements from Medicare and other government programs, and billing the government for unnecessary lab tests, though Scott personally was never charged with any wrongdoing. HCA wound up pleading guilty to more than a dozen criminal and civil charges and paying fines totaling $1.7 billion. In 1999, Columbia/HCA changed its name back to HCA, Inc.

In 2001, Hospital Corporation of America (HCA) reached a plea agreement with the U.S. government that avoided criminal charges against the company and included $95 million in fines. In late 2002, HCA agreed to pay the U.S. government $631 million, plus interest, and pay $17.5 million to state Medicaid agencies, in addition to $250 million paid up to that point to resolve outstanding Medicare expense claims. In all, civil lawsuits cost HCA more than $1.7 billion to settle, including more than $500 million paid in 2003 to two whistleblowers.

=== Omnicare fraud, 1999-2010 ===
From 1999 to 2004, Omnicare a major supplier of drugs to nursing homes, solicited and received kickbacks from Johnson & Johnson for recommending that physicians prescribe Risperdal, a Johnson & Johnson antipsychotic drug to nursing home patients. During this time Omnicare increased its annual drug purchases from $100 million to more than $280 million.

Starting in 2006, healthcare entrepreneur Adam B. Resnick sued Omnicare, under the False Claims Act, as well as the parties to the company's illegal kickback schemes. Omnicare allegedly paid kickbacks to nursing home operators in order to secure business, which constitutes Medicare fraud and Medicaid fraud. Omnicare allegedly had paid $50 million to the owners of the Mariner Health Care Inc. and SavaSeniorCare Administrative Services LLC nursing home chains in exchange for the right to continue providing pharmacy services to the nursing homes.

In November 2009, Omnicare paid $98 million to the federal government to settle five qui tam lawsuits brought under the False Claims Act and government charges that the company had paid or solicited a variety of kickbacks. The company admitted no wrongdoing.

In 2010, Omnicare settled Resnick's False Claims Act suit that had been taken up by the U.S. Department of Justice by paying $19.8 million to the federal government, while Mariner and SavaSeniorCare settled for $14 million.

=== Michigan Hematology-Oncology fraud ===
In 2013, Dr. Farid T. Fata was arrested on charges of providing chemotherapy treatments to patients who did not have cancer. Over a period of at least six years, Fata submitted US$34 million in fraudulent charges to private health practices and Medicare. At the time of his arrest, Fata owned Michigan Hematology-Oncology, one of Michigan's largest cancer practices. In September 2014, Fata pled guilty to sixteen federal charges: thirteen counts of healthcare fraud, two counts of money laundering, and one count of conspiring to pay and receive kickbacks and cash payments for referring patients to a particular hospice and home health care company. In addition to chemotherapy malpractice, the court found Fata guilty of mistreating patients with inappropriate octreotide, potent antiemetics, and parenteral vitamins.

Fata's fraud scheme was discovered after one of his patients suffered an injury unrelated to his treatment. After beginning a lifelong chemotherapy treatment prescribed by Fata, patient Monica Flagg broke her leg and was seen by another physician at his practice, Dr. Soe Maunglay. Maunglay realized that Flagg did not have cancer and advised her to switch doctors immediately. Although he was already due to leave Fata's practice over ethical concerns, Maunglay brought his concerns to the clinic's business manager, George Karadsheh. Karadsheh filed a successful False Claims Act suit against Fata, leading to his arrest. Barbara McQuade, the U.S. Attorney for the Eastern District of Michigan at the time, called the case "the most egregious case of fraud that [she had] ever seen in [her] life."

== 2010 Medicare Fraud Strike Task Force Charges ==
- In July 2010, the Medicare Fraud Strike Task Force announced its largest fraud discovery up until then, when charging 94 people nationwide for allegedly submitting a total of $251 million in fraudulent Medicare claims. The 94 people charged included doctors, medical assistants, and health care firm owners, and 36 of them have been found and arrested. Charges were filed in Baton Rouge (31 defendants charged), Miami (24 charged) Brooklyn, (21 charged), Detroit (11 charged) and Houston (four charged). By value, nearly half of the false claims were made in Miami-Dade County, Florida. The Medicare claims covered HIV treatment, medical equipment, physical therapy and other unnecessary services or items, or those not provided.
- In October 2010, network of Armenian gangsters and their associates used phantom healthcare clinics and other means to try to cheat Medicare out of $163 million, the largest fraud by one criminal enterprise in the program's history up until then according to U.S. authorities The operation was under the protection of an Armenian crime boss, known in the former Soviet Union as a "vor," Armen Kazarian. Of the 73 individuals indicted for this scheme, more than 50 people were arrested on October 13, 2010, in New York, California, New Mexico, Ohio and Georgia.

== 2011 Medicare Fraud Strike Task Force Charges ==
In September 2011, a nationwide takedown by Medicare Fraud Strike Force operations in eight cities resulted in charges against 91 defendants for their alleged participation in Medicare fraud schemes involving approximately $295 million in false billing.

== 2012 Medicare Fraud Strike Task Force Charges ==
In 2012, Medicare Fraud Strike Force operations in Detroit resulted in convictions against 2 defendants for their participation in Medicare fraud schemes involving approximately $1.9 million in false billing.

Victor Jayasundera, a physical therapist, pleaded guilty on January 18, 2012, and was sentenced in the Eastern District of Michigan. In addition to his 30-month prison term, he was sentenced to three years of supervised release and was ordered to pay $855,484 in restitution, joint and several with his co-defendants.

Fatima Hassan, co-owned a company known as Jos Campau Physical Therapy with Javasundera, pleaded guilty on August 25, 2011, for her role in the Medicare fraud schemes and on May 17, 2012, was sentenced to 48 months in prison.

== 2013 Medicare Fraud Strike Task Force Charges ==
In May 2013, Federal officials charged 89 people including doctors, nurses, and other medical professionals in eight U.S. cities with Medicare fraud schemes that the government said totaled over $223 million in false billings. The bust took more than 400 law enforcement officers including FBI agents in Miami, Detroit, Los Angeles, New York and other cities to make the arrests.

== 2015 Medicare Fraud Strike Task Force Charges ==
In June 2015, Federal officials charged 243 people including 46 doctors, nurses, and other medical professionals with Medicare fraud schemes. The government said the fraudulent schemes netted approximately $712 million in false billings in what is the largest crackdown undertaken by the Medicare Fraud Strike Force. The defendants were charged in the Southern District of Florida, Eastern District of Michigan, Eastern District of New York, Southern District of Texas, Central District of California, Eastern District of Louisiana, Northern District of Texas, Northern District of Illinois and the Middle District of Florida.

== 2019 Medicare Fraud Strike Task Force Charges ==
In April 2019, Federal officials charged Philip Esformes, 48 years old, of paying and receiving kickbacks and bribes in the then largest Medicare fraud case in U.S. history. The fraud took place between 2007 until 2016 and involved about $1.3 billion worth of fraudulent claims. Esformes was described as "a man driven by almost unbounded greed,". Esformes owned more than 20 assisted living facilities and skilled nursing homes.

Former Hospital Executive Odette Barcha, 50, was Esformes’ accomplice along with Arnaldo Carmouze, 57, a physical assistant in the Palmetto Bay, Florida area. These three constructed a team of corrupt physicians, hospitals, and private practices in South Florida. The scheme worked as follows: bribes and kickbacks where paid to physicians, hospitals, and practices to refer patients to the facilities owned and controlled by Esformes. The assisted living and skilled nursing facilities would admit the patients and bill Medicare and Medicaid for unnecessary, fabricated and sometimes harmful procedures. Some of the charges to Medicare and Medicaid included prescription narcotics prescribed to patients addicted to opioids to entice the patients to stay at the facility in order for the bill to increase. Another technique was to move patients in and out of facilities when the patients had reached the maximum number of days allowed by Medicare and Medicaid. This was accomplished by using one of the corrupt physicians to see the patients and coordinate for readmission in the same or a different facility owned by Esformes. Per Medicare and Medicaid guidelines, a patient is allowed 100 days at a skilled nursing facility after a hospital stay. The patient is given an additional 100 days if the he/she spends 6 days outside of a facility or is readmitted to a hospital for 3 additional days. The facilities not only fabricated medical documents to show treatment was done to a patient, they also hiked up the prices to equipment and medications that were never consumed or used. Barcha as the Director of the Outreach program expanded the group of corrupt physicians and practices. She would advise the community physicians and hospitals to refer patients to the facilities owned by Esformes in exchange for monetary gifts. The law against kickbacks is called the Anti-Kickback Statute or Stark Law, which makes it illegal for medical providers to refer patients to a facility owned by the physician or a family member for services billable to Medicare and Medicaid. It also prohibits providers to receive bribes for patient referrals. Carmouze prescribed unnecessary prescription drugs to patients who may or may not have needed the medications. He also facilitated community physicians to visit the patient in the assisted living facilities owned by Esformes in order for the physician to bill Medicare and Medicaid, for which Esformes received kickbacks. Carmouze also assisted in falsifying medical documentation to represent proof of medical necessity for many of the medications, procedures, visits, and equipment charged to the government. Esformes has been detained since 2016. In 2019, he was convicted to 20 years in prison.

On December 22, 2020, President Donald Trump commuted his sentence, upon suggestion by his son in law Jared Kushner and the Aleph Institute.

== Criticism of the system ==
The only practicable approach to health insurance for the elderly, according to Robert M. Ball, the former Commissioner of Social Security under President Kennedy in 1961 and later under Presidents Johnson and Nixon, was to finance health insurance in the same way as pension cash benefits — through contributions paid during working years, when payments are least burdensome, thereby providing protection in retirement without further payments. Government reports show that improper payments and fraud in Medicare and Medicaid amount to billions of dollars, and ensuring program integrity remains a top priority.

In the early 1960s relatively few elderly people had health insurance, and what they did have was generally inadequate. Insurers such as Blue Cross, which initially used community rating, faced competition from other commercial insurers that did not apply community rating, and were therefore forced to raise their rates for older people.

== See also ==
- Benefit fraud
- Health care fraud
- Quackery
- Zone Program Integrity Contractor
