= Operation Power Outage =

Sting operation targeted at Armenian Power gang

Operation Power Outage was a sting operation targeted at arresting and indicting members of the criminal group Armenian Power operating in the United States. The group is accused of racketeering offenses, bank fraud schemes, kidnappings, and drug trafficking.

== Apprehension ==
On February 16, 2011, in an operation conducted by the Eurasian Organized Crime Task Force which includes the U.S. Federal Bureau of Investigation, the U.S. Secret Service, U.S. Immigration and Customs Enforcement, the Office of Inspector General for U.S. Department of Health and Human Services, the IRS Criminal Investigation Division, the Los Angeles County Sheriff's Department, the Burbank Police Department, the Glendale Police Department and the Los Angeles Police Department, law enforcement apprehended 74 members and associates of the Armenian Power transnational criminal organization.

The suspects were arrested in about 90 locations throughout Southern California. About 1,000 law enforcement agents took part in the operation. The lead Eurasian Organized Crime Task Force was assisted by the U.S. Bureau of Alcohol, Tobacco, Firearms and Explosives, the U.S. Drug Enforcement Administration, the U.S. Marshals Service, the California Department of Motor Vehicles and the Bureau of Investigation of the Los Angeles County District Attorney's Office. It took approximately two years of investigations including usage of undercover agents to carry out the February 2011 arrests. Dubbed "Power Outage" the operation is recognized as the biggest one against Armenian Power syndicate to date.

A total of 113 defendants from four U.S. cities of Los Angeles, Santa Ana, Denver and Miami have been charged with racketeering, assault, robbery, bank fraud, kidnappings, firearms and drug trafficking, health care fraud, identity theft and credit card fraud. According to U.S. Assistant Attorney General Lanny A. Breuer, "the crimes alleged in these indictments were calculated, wide-ranging, and sophisticated" and ties of Armenian Power group transcend prisons and international borders. It is alleged that more than 400 crimes have been conducted by the group. One of the cases of kidnapping and racketeering involved kidnapping of a businessman and extorting $500,000. The arrests of Armenian Power members follow the 2010 Medicaid Fraud committed by other Armenian American criminals. Arrests took place in a similar crackdown in October 2010.

== Charges ==
Two federal indictments have been put forth in relation to the arrests. The first indictment charges 29 defendants with RICO conspiracy in violation of Racketeer Influenced and Corrupt Organizations Act of 1970, alleging the indicted criminals have conducted white-collar crimes including identity theft, credit card skimming and production and use of counterfeit checks. The 134-count indictment includes a specific case of bank fraud and counterfeit credit card scheme which victimized hundreds of customers of 99 Cents Only Stores in Southern California, eventually stealing more than $2 million by acquiring customer account information data at cash registers using secretly installed skimming devices and creating counterfeit debit and credit cards. Additionally, the indictment includes charges against Armenian Power members for kidnapping, extortion, bank fraud, aggravated identity theft, credit card fraud, marijuana distribution, and carrying out illegal gambling activities. FBI stated that the arrested criminals, if convicted, might face different sentences from 10 to 20 years in prison.

The second indictment from grand jury of Orange County charges 20 defendants, two of whom were also a subject of the first indictment, with bank fraud scheme which targeted elderly victims. Investigations revealed that the members of Armenian Power were cooperating with members of African-American street gangs and bribed some bank employees to obtain information which allowed them to take over bank accounts consequently causing losses amounting to a grand total of $10 million. Additionally, Los Angeles County District Attorney charged 11 defendants in seven cases filed in superior court. Federal authorities also charged 13 members in Miami and one in Denver. The Denver PD has arrested Nadezda Nikitina, 24 of Denver, Colorado, for her role in the Armenian Power-led fraud. A Russian immigrant, Nikitina is charged 10 counts of bank fraud, wire fraud and with conspiring with others to make false statements on credit and consumer, home equity loan applications.

Some examples of racketeering and extortion include kidnapping a victim, threatening him with violence in an auto body shop belonging to one of Armenian Power members as well as targeting another victim with an extortion scheme for repeated payments lasting several months by threats to the victim himself and his family. The defendants were allegedly also in possession of marijuana and firearms. Financial crimes part of the indictments alleges that the members of Armenian Power also engaged in a large scale fraudulent check scheme where they obtained customer information for high value accounts, impersonated the customers of banks to order checks and then cashed and deposited checks thus emptying accounts of actual customers. In addition to ordering checks, members of the group allegedly went to the residences of victims and stole blank checks. A grand total of damages caused by members of Armenian Power is $20 million.

== See also ==
- 2010 Medicaid Fraud
