= Epedigree =

Electronic document which provides data on the history of a particular batch of a drug

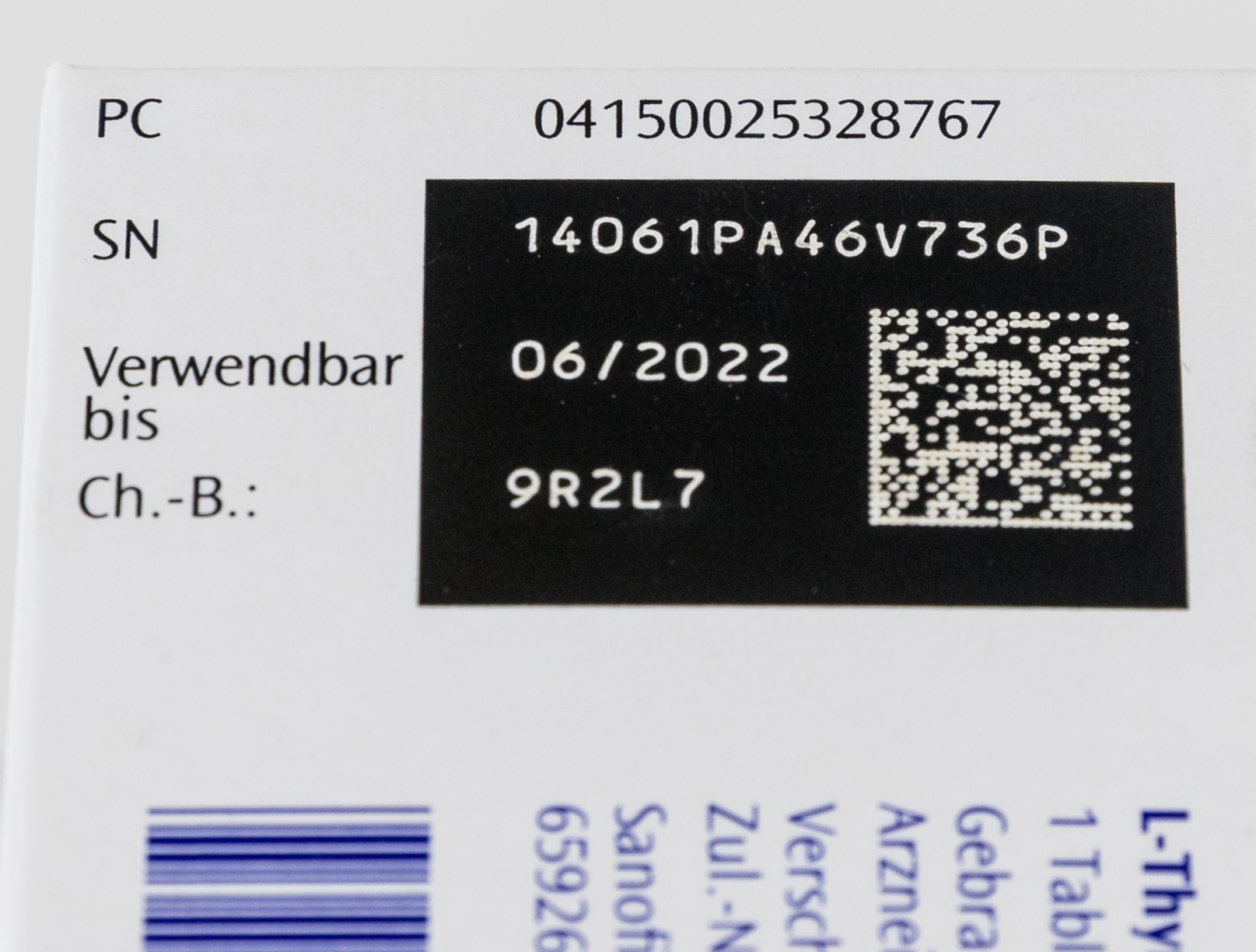
Epedigree on a package with Levothyroxine

An epedigree (sometimes referred to as e-pedigree or electronic pedigree) is an electronic document which provides data on the history of a particular batch of a drug. It satisfies the requirement for a drug pedigree while using a convenient electronic form.

== Pedigree ==
The U.S. Food and Drug Administration (FDA) in the 2006 Compliance Policy Guide for the Prescription Drug Marketing Act states that:

"A drug pedigree is a statement of origin that identifies each prior sale, purchase, or trade of a drug, including the date of those transactions and the names and addresses of all parties to them."

An epedigree is simply an electronic document which satisfies the pedigree requirement. The primary purpose of an epedigree is to protect consumers from any contaminated medicine or counterfeit drugs.

== Standard ==
On January 5, 2007 EPCglobal ratified the Pedigree Standard as an international standard that specifies an XML description of the life history of a product across an arbitrarily complex supply chain.

As of 2008, most states have enacted some sort of pedigree requirement and many have also required an epedigree. However, the existing epedigree requirements amount to little more than requiring that pharmaceutical supply chain companies be able to provide reports in formats such as pdf, text files or spreadsheets.

The basic data elements of an original epedigree are:

- Lot
- Potency
- Expiration
- National Drug Code and Electronic Product Code
- Manufacturer
- Distributor, Wholesaler or Pharmacy
- Unique identifier of the salable unit

As the product moves down the supply chain, each company is required to carry forward all previous epedigree information. In this way, the final point of sale has the complete lineage of every unit.

== Laws ==
ePedigree laws were eventually replaced by a harmonized national standard called the Drug Quality and Security Act.

ePedigree laws were in a rapid state of flux with states changing the "drop dead" date for compliance with tracking and authentication years beyond the original dates set by Florida and California. The definitive requirements will include serialization. Companies that focus purely on achieving compliance will miss the opportunity to use regulation as a business driver. The ability to track and serialize unit level saleable packages (e.g. bottle of 25 pills) not just cases or pallets can create business value in knowing exactly where their products are purchased can do the following: 1) Minimize cost of chargebacks through 100% accurate adjudication. Chargebacks account for 2-15% of gross revenue for a pharmaceutical manufacturer. 2) Minimize risk by increasing accuracy in Medicare/Medicaid pricing calculations by fully knowing all fees, rebates, and chargebacks that should be applied to a specific unit sale. Over $4B in fines have been handed down for improperly calculating Medicare/Medicaid pricing. 3) Limit liability of having to recall entire lots of product because a (non-serialized) shipment was stolen - see example: 4) Achieve visibility for manufacturers in the labyrinth that is the wholesale distribution network to more accurately forecast demand and measure sales & marketing programs.

Although simple epedigree systems are an important first step, significant improvement in public safety would result from a more standardized and automated approach. The larger and more difficult task of providing for an Automated Epedigree System has been suggested, but not required by any state. Such a system would require fairly significant changes to supply chain companies' data interchanges and would certainly require advanced Track and Trace technology (with bar codes or RFID). The requirements that come closest to an Automated Epedigree System have been proposed by California. In March 2008, the California Board of Pharmacy (CBOP) published its "E-Pedigree Requirements" which are scheduled to go into effect in a phased approach between 2015 and 2017 (since abandoned). CBOP has proposed an XML standard document and the law requires an "interoperable electronic system".
