= Ashifi Gogo =

Businessperson

- Known for: Co-founded Sproxil in 2009 to fight the proliferation of counterfeit drugs in Africa

Ashifi Gogo co-founded Sproxil in 2009 to fight the proliferation of counterfeit drugs in Africa.

== Education ==
Gogo received a Bachelor of Arts degree from Whitman College in 2005, earning a double major in Mathematics and Physics. He received his PhD in Engineering from Dartmouth College. He also attended his early education in Ghana. He was at Kwame Nkrumah University of Science and Technology primary and Junior High School.

== Honors and awards ==
Gogo was named to Fortune's 2005 '40 under 40' list of the most influential business people.
