= Sproxil =

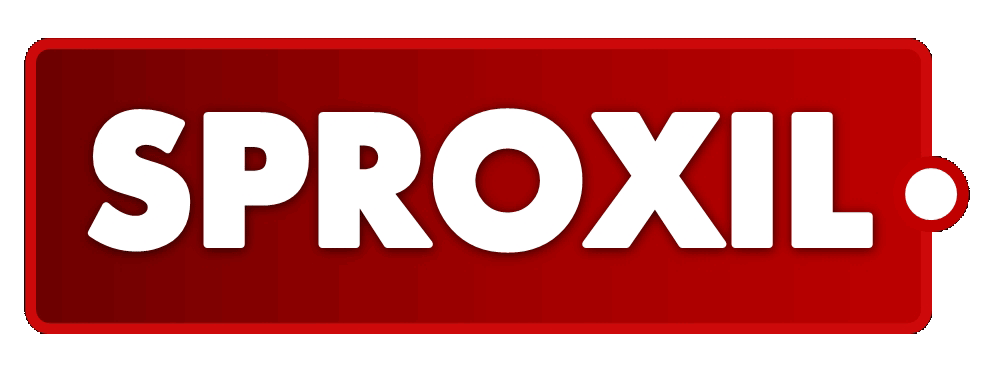
- Sproxil logo
- Type: Private
- Headquarters: Cambridge, Massachusetts, U.S.
- Area served: West Africa; East Africa; Asia
- Key people: Ashifi Gogo CEO; Alden Zecha, CFO
- Website: Sproxil.com

Sproxil is an American venture capital-backed for-profit company based in Cambridge, Massachusetts that provides a consumer product verification service (called Mobile Authentication Service or MAS) to help consumers avoid purchasing counterfeit products. The service was the first Mobile Authentication Service (MAS) to launch in Nigeria.

Sproxil has operations in Nigeria, Mali, Ghana (serving West Africa), Tanzania, Kenya (serving East Africa), India and Pakistan (Asia).

== Activity ==
Package with Sproxil label and phone showing SMS reply

Sproxil's service places a security label with a scratch-off panel on all protected products. Consumers scratch off the panel at a point of purchase to reveal a unique one-time use code. This is a form of mass serialization. The code is sent via SMS or mobile app to a country-specific short code, and the consumer receives a reply almost instantly indicating that the product is genuine or suspicious. The company also has a 24/7 call center to provide support during the verification process and take in anonymous reports of suspicious counterfeiting activity.

== Recent activity ==
In 2010, NAFDAC, the Nigerian government agency overseeing food and drugs, endorsed the Sproxil platform and the service has been widely deployed throughout Nigeria. In April 2011, CNN published a video discussing the role Sproxil played in the fight against counterfeit drugs in Nigeria.

In February 2011, Sproxil announced that it had received $1.8 million in funding from Acumen Fund. Funding is being used to help the company expand into India.

Johnson & Johnson and GSK (GlaxoSmithKline) are using Sproxil services in Africa as is the Nigerian distributor of Merck KGaA named Biofem.

In June 2011, Sproxil launched operations in India and in July 2011 Kenya's Pharmacy and Poisons Board (PPB) also adopted similar text message-based anti-counterfeiting systems. As of early 2012, Sproxil announced that more than one million people in Africa had checked their medicines using the text-message based verification service developed by Sproxil.

In February 2013, Sproxil signed on East African Cables to protect their electric cables through the Zinduka Initiative. The initiative utilizes the MPA solution to help consumers verify that their electrical cables are genuine before purchase. This partnership marked Sproxil's further expansion into non-pharmaceutical markets. Other industries that uses Sproxil's solution is textile and clothing (underwear).

In 2014, the company expanded its Mobile Authentication services, originally available to consumers by SMS and call center, by adding mobile apps to their solution suite. The same year, Sproxil became ISO-27001 (for information security controls) and ISO-9001 (for quality management systems) certified after a comprehensive review of its internal processes. Soon after, Kenya-based agribusiness company Juanco SPS officially launched a consumer-facing project that protects pesticide Bestox 100EC with MPA technology.

== Awards ==
2017 Unilever Global Development Award

2016 Innovative Healthcare Service Provider Of The Year

2015 Interface Health Excellence (IHX) Challenge

2015 Frost & Sullivan's Enabling Technology Leadership Award

2014 Schwab Foundation Social Entrepreneur of the Year Award

2013 USPTO Patents for Humanity Award

2013 #1 in health care and #7 overall in Fast Company Magazine World's 50 Most Innovative Companies

2012 ISMP Cheers Award - George DiDomizio Industry Award

2012 ICC World Business and Development Award

2010 Honorable Mention Global Finals, IBM Entrepreneur SmartCamp Competition

2010 MassChallenge Finalist

2010 Mobile Infrastructure Award, MITX

2010 People's Choice Award at Accelerate Michigan

2010 Prize Winner, African Diaspora Marketplace

2010 Audience Choice Award Life Sciences at Xconomy Xsite

2009 Outstanding Commitment Award in Global Health, Clinton Global Initiative University

== See also ==
- Mass serialization
- World Customs Organization
- Millennium Development Goals
