= Pharmacy and Poisons Board =

Drug regulatory authority in Kenya

The Pharmacy and Poisons Board (PPB or the Board in short) is the Drug Regulatory Authority established under the Pharmacy and Poisons Act, Chapter 244 of the Laws of Kenya.

The Board regulates the Practice of Pharmacy and the Manufacture and Trade in drugs and poisons.

== Mandate ==
The Pharmacy and Poisons Act, Cap 244 is an Act of Parliament to make better provision for the Control of the Profession of Pharmacy and trade in drugs and poisons.

The Pharmacy and Poisons Board is established as a body corporate, under the Pharmacy and Poisons Act, Cap 244 Laws of Kenya. The PPB is regulatory body within the Ministry of Medical Services. It is a body corporate under Section 3(6), and the de-linking process is on-going.

== Membership of the Board ==
The board members consists of the following: (1) There is established a Board which shall consist of— (a) a chairperson who shall be appointed by the President and who shall— (i) be a registered pharmacist of good standing with a degree in pharmacy; and (ii) have at least ten years' experience in the pharmaceutical sector; (b) the Director of pharmaceutical services; (c) the Principal Secretary in the ministry for the time being responsible for matters relating to finance or his or her representative; (d) two persons representing the pharmacy training institutions, of which one shall be a pharmacist and one shall be a pharmaceutical technologist; (e) three other persons appointed by the Cabinet Secretary, of whom— (i) one person shall be a pharmacist representing institutions of higher learning; (ii) one person shall be a pharmaceutical technologist representing mid-level colleges; and (iii) one person shall be an enrolled pharmaceutical technologist with expertise in community Health Laws (Amendment) 2019

== Services ==
The Board offers the following services:

1. Product Evaluation and Registration. Certificates of Analysis are issued by three accredited laboratories namely the National Quality Control Laboratory, MEDS and the Drug Analysis and Research Unit,

2. Evaluation of Applications for Advertisements of Medicines and Medical Devices

3. Ensuring Good Manufacturing Practice (GMP)

4. Registration of Pharmacists

5. Enrolment of Pharmaceutical Technologists

6. Issuance of Annual Practice Licenses

7. Issuance of Annual Permits for Pharmaceutical Representatives

8. Approval of Institutions Offering Pharmacy Training Programmes

9. Approval of Pharmaceutical Imports and Exports

10. Registration of Pharmaceutical Premises/Outlets

11. Pharmacovigilance and Post-Market Surveillance

12. Documentation and Information Services on Medicines and Pharmacy Practice

13. Public relations services for the pharmaceutical sector

== Functions of the Board ==
The functions of the Board as spelt out by law are as follows:

- To advice the Minister of Health on all matters relating to administration and implementation of the law.
- To ensure that all medicinal products manufactured in, imported into or exported from the country conform to prescribed standards of quality, safety and efficacy and that the personnel, premises and practices employed to manufacture, promote, procure, store, distribute and sell such products comply with defined codes of practice and other requirements.
- To ensure continued conformity of medicinal products with set standards until their delivery to the end user.
- To ensure that medicinal products are imported, manufactured, exported, stocked, sold, distributed or otherwise dealt with by duly authorised persons.
- To grant after due assessment, licences/authorisations for medicinal products, whether locally manufactured or imported and whether destined for the national market or export.
- To revoke the registration/authorisation of, or cause to be recalled from the market, such medicinal products and the continued use of which may be detrimental to public health.
- To maintain an inventory of registered medicinal products.
- To publish lists of registered medicinal products and of products with marketing authorisations from time to time for public information.
- To ensure that registration dossiers for medicinal products are kept up to date by the applicants and to approve alternations/changes thereto.
- To inspect and license/authorise all manufacturing premises, importing agents, wholesalers, distributors, hospitals, dispensaries, pharmacies and retail outlets.
- To provide for sampling and analysis and other testing of finished medicinal products released into the distribution chain to assure their compliance with labelled specifications
- To monitor the market for the presence of illegal/counterfeit medicinal products.
- To ensure that the promotion and marketing of medicinal products is in accordance with product information as approved by the Board.
- To disseminate information on medicinal products to the Professions to promote their rational use.
- To monitor and review the implementation of the legislation on pharmaceutical products.
- To advise the Minister on matters concerning control and registration of medicinal products.
- To amend the rules and regulations as deemed necessary to keep pace with time demand(s).
- To register pharmacists after due assessment and maintain the list of registered pharmacists.
- To enroll pharmaceutical technologists after due assessment and maintain the roll of enrolled pharmaceutical technologists.
- Inspect all institutions' training pharmaceutical programmes for the purpose of approval and retention in the PPB register.

== Registration of Pharmacists and Enrollment of Pharmaceutical Technologists ==
The process is done through administration of a professional examination to the persons with degree and diploma certificates from institutions recognised by Pharmacy and Poisons Board. There are two types of examinations for each group namely;

(i) Stage I and II for pharmacist (ii) Level I and II for Pharmaceutical Technologist

Stage I examinations – This is administered to persons with degree from universities outside Kenya. When one pass he/she proceeds for a one-year internship, supervised by Pharmacy and Poisons Board.

Stage II Examination- This is administered to persons from University of Nairobi after completing one-year internship supervised by PPB and Stage I group upon completion of one-year internship. The pharmacists that pass Stage II exams are entered into the pharmacists register.

Level I examination – This administered to persons with diploma obtained in colleges (i) outside Kenya and (ii) approved by Pharmacy and Poisons Board other than Kenya Medical Training College. Once one passes the exam, they proceed to a seven months practical attachment supervised by PPB.

Level II examination – This is administering to persons for KMTC and those that have finished the seven-month attachment. Upon passing this the name of pharmaceutical technologist is entered into the Roll of Pharmaceutical Technologist.

== Annual Practice License ==
Registered pharmacists and enrolled pharmaceutical technologists are legally required to hold an annual practice licence when working. This is obtained from PPB an application using a prescribed form, and issued by Training and Assessment department.
