= 2010 Medicaid fraud =

Organized crime event in the United States

A case of Medicaid fraud was carried out in 2010 by an Armenian-American organized crime group called the Mirzoyan–Terdjanian organization. The scam involved a crime syndicate which created 118 fake clinics in 25 states and used stolen medical license numbers of real doctors and matched them to legitimate Medicare patients whose names and billing information were also stolen. The group submitted more than $163 million in claims and received $35 million of that before they were caught. Prosecutors charged 73 individuals in several states with allegations of racketeering conspiracy, bank fraud, money laundering and identity theft.

== The crackdown ==
A scandal surfaced involving a case to defraud the Medicaid and other healthcare programs such as Medicare. With an estimated amount to be stolen totalling $163 million of which $35 million was already acquired by the criminals, it involved more than 50 ethnic Armenians living in the United States who were arrested on October 13, 2010. The operation was run by more than 400 FBI agents. In addition to FBI, IRS and local enforcement agencies in California, Georgia, New Mexico, New York and Ohio were involved in the probe. The Justice Department has already indicted 73 individuals in New York and four other states. 44 defendants were indicted in New York, along with 10 in California, seven in New Mexico, six in Ohio and six in Georgia. According to the authorities, the Armenian-American organized crime group operated across 25 states.

== Leadership ==
According to the authorities, the individuals acted within an organized crime enterprise run by Armen Kazarian aka PZO, a Soviet Union mobster part of the Vor v zakone who arrived in the US in 1996 and resided in Glendale, California. The other alleged ringleaders, Davit Mirzoyan, 34, also from Glendale and Robert Terdjanian, 35, from Brooklyn were also indicted. The authorities said most members of the organization were Armenian nationals or immigrants. The suspects have been allegedly laundering the stolen money. Prosecutors said that Kazarian travelled to New York to erase a $200,000 debt of one associate to another. When the second associate was unable to pay the fee of $100,000 for that service, his yacht was seized by Kazarian.

== Charges ==
According to authorities, the investigation started after they received reports about theft of personal information, including Social Security numbers of 2,900 Medicare patients in upstate New York. The government claimed the group billed Medicare from phantom clinics for unnecessary medical services or for services which were never performed by stealing the identities of both doctors and patients. According to officials, about $35 million of the bills claimed by the network was paid out by Medicaid already. A total of 118 medical clinics in 25 states were used to defraud the US health insurance program. One of the fake clinics was run from a small office over Coney Island auto body shop. Two Queens doctors and a worker at the Lutheran Hospital in Brooklyn were part of the gangster network. The U.S. District Attorney for the Southern District of New York, Preet Bharara, declared that the Mirzoyan–Terdjanian organization, an Armenian-run syndicate in New York and Los Angeles, used threats, intimidation and violence, operating in classic mafia style. Bharara said "This Armenian group allegedly employed a raft of rackets, extortion, credit-card fraud, identity theft, immigration fraud, and even distribution of contraband cigarettes and stolen Viagra" The penalties range from 10 years to life in prison. The defendants will be tried in the states where they have been indicted.

In the state of Georgia, six people, Arthur Manasarian, 58; Gegham Sargsyan, 56; Khoren Gasparian, 27; Sahak Tumanyan, 43, and his wife, Hasmik Tumanyan, 38; and Toni R. Lowery, 27, five of them being ethnic Armenians were indicted for opening, operating and filing false claims to defraud Medicaid from five fake clinics in Brunswick, Savannah and Macon such as "Brunswick Medical Supply Inc". Sargsyan and Gasparian have escaped and are believed to have possibly left the country. One of the highest amounts of the stolen taxpayer money is attributed to the state of Ohio, where the criminals of the organization billed the state for $44 million of which $20 million was paid out. All six charged with the crime by Ohio authorities are ethnic Armenians: Karen Chilyan, Eduard Oganesyan, and Arus Gyulbudakyan, aka Fina Markova, the leader of Ohio ring, were apprehended, while Lilit Galstyan, Julieta Ghazaryan, and Marine Movsisyan are still at-large.

== Outcome ==
On July 8, 2011, the leader of the criminal network Armen Kazarian pleaded guilty to racketeering charges. He faced up to 20 years in prison. Sentencing was scheduled for 6 October 2011. In February 2013, Kazarian was sentenced to 37 months in prison, to three years of supervised release and was also ordered to pay a $60,000 fine.

== See also ==
- Operation Power Outage
- Armenian mafia
- Armenian Power
- Healthcare fraud
