= Double billing =

Charging for the same product twice

Double billing refers to charging for the same product twice.

== Commerce ==
In commerce, double billing is the error of charging a customer twice for the same unique product or service. Errors of this kind are known to occur because of issues such as a change in product name or due to software glitches.

== Law ==
In law, double billing refers to charging an hourly rate to two clients for the same time spent working. The American Bar Association prohibits double billing. It is tantamount to overcharging, since the amount of time actually spent working on any one client's work is less than the amount billed to that client.

Associates and partners alike at large law firms face significant pressure to double bill or to "pad" their hours in order to reduce overwork. These attorneys are usually required to bill 1800 to 2000 hours per year. This can ideally work out to a 40-hour work week, but it is usually 60 or more, since most attorneys must spend around two hours in the office for every one that they can bill to a specific client. In 1998, Cameron Stracher's book Double Billing suggested that double billing is common in law firms, but that implication was misleading. However, several recent studies suggest that at least 1/3 of lawyers admit that they double-bill clients on at least an occasional basis, and that more than half of lawyers do not believe that double billing constitutes an ethical violation.
