= Drug fraud =

Fraud involving adulteration of drugs

Drug fraud is a type of fraud in which drugs, legal or illegal, are cut or altered in such a way that diminishes their value below that which they are sold for.

== Illegal drug fraud ==
This type of drug fraud occurs when the dealer cuts or commingles the pure drug with a similar substance such as baby powder or powdered milk. When this is sold to the user, the user receives less of a high and so must buy more to get the previous high. There may also be adverse health consequences as a result of the cutting substance, such as a bad trip or overdose. This can also be seen in prescription drugs.

== Legal drug fraud ==
Legal drug fraud occurs when a physician prescribes medication for a patient under false pretenses. This may be because the manufacturers of the drug have paid the doctor a fee to dispense their drug. Another cause may be drug pricing fraud, in which a physician prescribes a patient expensive drugs, that they may or may not need, in order to profit from the receipts.

Patients too, may participate in this. A common method is the forging of doctor prescriptions to gain access to prescription medications. A somewhat rarer type is a citizen posing as a doctor to, among other things, gain access to the free samples of drugs that some drug manufacturers give out. The samples may also be sold to desperate patients at an exorbitant rate. Actual physicians may do this also. Others may prescribe drugs without sufficient cause.

== Legal status ==
Illegal drug fraud is rarely addressed in court, as victims rarely involve police, but legal drug fraud is on the rise. Its upswing has increased calls for accountability as well as a bill being passed in the United States, 2007 Senate Bill 88.

== See also ==
- Quackery
- Double billing
- Counterfeit medications
- Pharmaceutical fraud
