= Health care fraud =

Defrauding of a health insurer

Health care fraud includes "snake oil" marketing, health insurance fraud, drug fraud, and medical fraud. Health insurance fraud occurs when a company or an individual defrauds an insurer or government health care program, such as Medicare (United States) or equivalent State programs. The manner in which this is done varies, and persons engaging in fraud are always seeking new ways to circumvent the law. Damages from fraud can be recovered by use of the False Claims Act, most commonly under the qui tam provisions which rewards an individual for being a whistleblower, or relator (law).

The FBI estimates that Health Care Fraud costs American tax payers $80 billion a year. In fiscal year 2025, False Claims Act settlements and judgments exceeded $6.8 billion, a record for a single year. More than $5.7 billion of that total came from matters involving the health care industry. Most of these cases were filed under qui tam provisions.

== Types ==
There are several different schemes used to defraud the health care system. Health care fraud can include fraudulent entries into the medical record.

=== Billing for services not rendered ===
Often done as a way of billing Medicare for things that never happened. This can involve forging the signature of those enrolled in Medicare, and the use of bribes or "kickbacks" to corrupt medical professionals. In the case of duplicate claims a provider does not submit exactly the same bill, but changes some small portion like the date in order to charge Medicare twice for the same service rendered. Rather than a single claim being filed twice, the same service is billed two times in an attempt to be paid twice.

=== Kickbacks ===
Kickbacks are rewards such as cash, jewelry, free vacations, corporate sponsored retreats, or other lavish gifts used to entice medical professionals into using specific medical services. This could be a small cash kickback for the use of an MRI when not required, or a lavish doctor/patient retreat that is funded by a pharmaceutical company to entice the prescription and use of a particular drug. Other forms of payment that could be illegal kickbacks include paid speaking positions at events, consulting contracts, and research grants.

=== Upcoding of items and services ===
Similar to upcoding of services, but involving the use of medical equipment. An example is billing Medicare for a power-assisted wheelchair while only giving the patient a manual wheelchair.

Billing Medicare programs for services that are more costly than the actual procedure that was done. It is a form of billing fraud where healthcare service providers submit false billing codes to obtain higher reimbursement at the expense of programs like Medicare, Medicaid, and TRICARE.

=== Unbundling ===
Bills for a particular service are submitted in piecemeal, that appear to be staggered out over time. These services would normally cost less when bundled together, but by manipulating the claim, a higher charge is billed to Medicare resulting in a higher pay out to the party committing the fraud.

=== Unnecessary health care and excessive services ===
Excessive service occurs when Medicare is billed for something greater than what the level of actual care requires. This can include medical related equipment as well as services. Unnecessary health care fraud occurs when claims are filed for care that in no way applies to the condition of a patient, such as an echo cardiogram billed for a patient with a sprained ankle.

== Examples ==
In the case United States ex rel. Donigian v. St. Jude Medical, Inc., No. 06-CA-11166-DPW (D. Mass.) St. Jude Medical, Inc. agreed to pay $16 million to quiet allegations of paying kickbacks to physicians. The whistleblower was able to provide detailed insider information as to the nature of the kickbacks, which ranged from entertainment to sporting event tickets and other gifts. The relator in this case was awarded $2.64 million

The case United States et al., ex rel. Jim Conrad and Constance Conrad v. Forest Pharmaceuticals, Inc, et al., No. 02-cv-11738-NG (D. Mass.) involved a drug manufacturer selling a drug, Levothroid, that had never been approved by the FDA. These allegations settled for $42.5 million due to multiple whistleblowers stepping forward to provide detailed information on the alleged fraud. The collective reward to the relators in this case was over $14.6 million.

Copied and pasted entries into the Electronic Medical Record may constitute fraud. A U.S. Department of Veterans Affairs, Veterans Health Administration pulmonologist at the Montgomery, Alabama facility copied and pasted data entered by other physicians into electronic medical records that he signed. The VA Office of the Medical Inspector reported this finding to Congress in 2013.

In the case United States ex rel. Brown v. Celgene Corp., CV10-3165, drug company Celgene agreed to pay $280 million on the eve of trial. The settlement resolved allegations that the company marketed and sold cancer drugs Thalomid and Revlimid for non-FDA approved uses.

In the case US v. Javaid Perwaiz, former OBGYN Perwaiz, a gynecologist from Pakistan and in Virginia, performed unnecessary surgeries on women. He was charged with 26 counts of health care fraud, 33 counts of false statements related to health care matters, 3 counts of aggravated identity theft, and 1 count of criminal forfeiture-health care fraud. He faced a maximum of 539 years (6,648 months) if convicted of all counts. The jury found him guilty of 23 counts of health care fraud and 30 counts of false statements related to health care matters. He faced 475 years. That would give him 10 years for 13 health care fraud counts and 20 years for 10 others because those 10 others resulted in serious bodily injury, and 5 years for false statements related to healthcare matters. When prosecutors asked for 50 years, they returned with 9 more. According to Federal Bureau of Prisons, Perwaiz is currently incarcerated at FCI Cumberland Camp and his release date is February 16, 2070.

In June 2026 the Justice Department announced the 2026 National Health Care Fraud Takedown, in which 455 defendants were charged over alleged schemes involving more than $6.5 billion in false claims.

Scholars and practitioners have noted that health care fraud enforcement sometimes involves aggressive charging decisions that are later tested at trial. Foley Hoag’s 2025 review of health care fraud enforcement described an increase in “high risk” prosecutions that depend heavily on inferences about clinician intent and coding judgments, and highlighted a growing number of full acquittals in federal healthcare fraud cases. One example is United States v. Muhamad Aly Rifai, in which a federal jury in Pennsylvania in 2024 acquitted a community psychiatrist of all charges stemming from approximately US$1 million in alleged fraudulent billing to Medicare. Local coverage reported that jurors accepted the defense position that the disputed claims reflected clinical judgment and documentation practices rather than criminal conduct. Commentators cite such cases to illustrate the tension between efforts to deter abusive billing and the risk of criminalizing complex medical decision making. The case of United States v. Bothra, which resulted in a full acquittal, highlights this issue. Muhamad Aly Rifai, an exonerated physician, wrote about this in his book Doctor Not Guilty, similarly exonerated physician Raj Bothra wrote about his ordeal in his book USA v. Raj.

== Laws ==
Under federal law, health care fraud in the United States is defined, and made illegal, primarily by the health care fraud statute in 18 U.S.C. § 1347 states

(a) Whoever knowingly executes, or attempts to execute, a scheme or artifice—

(1) to defraud a financial institution; or
(2) to obtain, by means of false or fraudulent pretenses, representations, or promises, any of the money or property owned by, or under the custody or control of, any health care benefit program, in connection with the delivery of or payment for health care benefits, items, or services, shall be fined under this title or imprisoned not more than 10 years, or both. If the violation results in serious bodily injury (as defined in section 1365 of this title), such person shall be fined under this title or imprisoned not more than 20 years, or both; and if the violation results in death, such person shall be fined under this title, or imprisoned for any term of years or for life, or both.

(b) With respect to violations of this section, a person need not have actual knowledge of this section or specific intent to commit a violation of this section.

== See also ==
- Benefit fraud
- Medicare fraud
- Quackery
