= The Beast =

The Beast may refer to:

== Religion ==
- The Beast (Revelation), one of three beasts described in the New Testament Book of Revelation

== Fictional characters ==
- The Beast, imaginary monster in William Golding's novel Lord of the Flies (1954)
- The Beast, demon in the Poltergeist film franchise (1982–2015)
- The main antagonist assassin in the film Kung Fu Hustle (2004)
- The main antagonist in the novel The Magicians (Grossman novel) (2009)
  - The same character in the television series The Magicians (2015–2020)
- The Beast, a main character in the traditional fairy tale Beauty and the Beast (traced back for millennea, in publication since 1740)
  - The Beast (Disney), from the animated Disney film Beauty and the Beast (1991)
- The Beast, mysterious humanoid antagonist in the miniseries Over the Garden Wall (2014)
- The Beast, creature from the Doctor Who two-part story episodes "The Impossible Planet" and "The Satan Pit" (2006)
- The Beast, a split personality of the character Kevin Wendell Crumb and an antagonist in M. Night Shyamalan's film Split (2016)
- Beast (Marvel Comics), originally known as The Beast (1963–present)
- The canine main antagonist of the 1993 film The Sandlot

== Films ==
- The Beast (1916), a Fox Film silent film
- The Beast (1974 film), a French/Italian drama
- La Bête (The Beast), a 1975 French film
- The Beast (1986 film), an Icelandic film
- The Beast (1988 film), an American film based on the play Nanawatai
- The Beast (1996 film), a television film based on the 1991 novel Beast
- The Beast (1995), shown at 1995 Cannes Film Festival Short Films Competition
- The Beast (2007), a television film starring Ian Gomez
- The Beast (2019 film), a South Korean film
- The Beast (2020 film), an Italian film
- The Beast (2023 film), a French film by Bertrand Bonello
- The Beast (2026 film), an American action film directed by Renny Harlin

== Television ==
=== Episodes ===
- "The Beast", A Scare at Bedtime series 2, episode 8 (1998)
- "The Beast", Adam-12 season 5, episode 17 (1973)
- "The Beast", Cavendish episode 1 (2019)
- "The Beast", Kung Fu Panda: The Dragon Knight season 2, episode 7 (2023
- "The Beast", Neon Genesis Evangelion episode 2 (1995)
- "The Beast", Single Parents season 1, episode 8 (2018)
- "The Beast", Special Unit 2 season 2, episode 8 (2001)
- "The Beast", Supersex episode 3 (2024)
- "The Beast", The Bridge (2013) season 1, episode 5 (2013)
- "The Beast", The Butcher episode 6 (2019)
- "The Beast", The Case Study of Vanitas part 2, episode 16 (2022)
- "The Beast", The Dead Files season 3, episode 19 (2013)
- "The Beast", The Magical Adventures of Quasimodo episode 15 (1996)
- "The Beast", Tracker (Canadian) episode 6 (2001)
- "The Beast", True Blue episode 8 (1990)

=== Shows ===
- The Beast (2001 TV series), a short-lived American drama series created by Kario Salem
- The Beast (2009 TV series), an American crime drama starring Patrick Swayze

== Music ==
- The Beast, a guitar owned by Bernie Marsden (active 1972–2023)
- The Beast (band), a hip hop and jazz band (2007–present)
- The Beast (album), by Vader, 2004
- "The Beast" (Angus & Julia Stone song), 2007
- "The Beast" (Lady Gaga song), 2025
- "The Beast", a song by Concrete Blonde from Bloodletting, 1990
- "The Beast", a song by Darkthrone from Ravishing Grimness, 1999
- "The Beast", a song by the Fugees from The Score, 1996
- "The Beast", a song by Lady Gaga from Mayhem, 2025
- "The Beast", a song by Misha Mansoor from Arcane League of Legends: Season 2, 2024
- "The Beast", a song by Nebula from Atomic Ritual, 2003

== Books ==
=== Fiction ===
- The Beast, a 1910 novel by Ben B. Lindsey and Harvey J. O'Higgins
- The Beast, a 1924 novel by William Lacey Amy, under the pseudonym Luke Allan
- The Beast, a 1936 novel by Claude Houghton
- The Beast, a 1965 novel by A. E. van Vogt
- The Beast, a 1978 short story collection by Hugh Fleetwood
- The Beast, a 1981 novel by Jonathan Fast
- The Beast, a 1982 novel by Robert Lester Stallman, the third installment in his Book of the Beast trilogy
- The Beast, a 1984 novel by Martyn Godfrey
- The Beast, a 1986 novel by Sharman Macdonald
- The Beast, a 1994 novel by R. L. Stine
- The Beast, a 2003 novel by Walter Dean Myers
- The Beast (Roslund & Hellström novel), published in Swedish as Odjuret, a 2005 novel by Anders Roslund and Börge Hellström
- The Beast (Mola novel), a 2021 novel by the pseudonymous Spanish writer Carmen Mola

=== Non-fiction ===
- The Beast: The Scandalous Life of Aleister Crowley, a 1959 book by Daniel P. Mannix
- The Beast: Riding the Rails and Dodging Narcos on the Migrant Trail, a 2013 translation of a 2010 nonfiction work by El Salvadorian journalist Óscar Martínez

== People ==
- The Beast (nickname), a list of people
- The Beast (wrestler), ring name of Yvon Cormier (1938–2009), Canadian professional wrestler
- Brock Lesnar (born 1977), American professional wrestler and former mixed martial arts fighter
- Bob Sapp (born 1973), American mixed martial arts fighter
- Dan Severn (born 1958), American mixed martial arts fighter
- Daigo Umehara (born 1981), Japanese professional gamer
- Mark Labbett (born 1965), British TV personality known for his role as a Chaser on The Chase
- Adebayo Akinfenwa, British footballer
- Eddie Hall (born 1988), British strongman
- "The Beast from the East", the nickname of American professional wrestler Bam Bam Bigelow (1961–2007)

== Other uses ==
- The Beast, the working title for the film King Kong
- La Bestia ("The Beast"), a Mexican freight train ridden north by migrants
- Presidential state car (United States), the state car of the President of the United States, nicknamed "The Beast"
- The Beast, a Rolls-Royce Meteor powered automobile, later based on a Rolls-Royce Merlin
- The Beast (roller coaster), a wooden roller coaster at Kings Island near Cincinnati, Ohio
- The Beast (game), an alternate reality game promoting A.I.: Artificial Intelligence
- The Beast (newspaper), a Buffalo, New York newspaper
- The Daily Beast, an American news and opinion website
- 2014 HQ_{124}, a near-Earth asteroid nicknamed "The Beast"
- "The Beast", the 2016 Fort McMurray wildfire in Alberta, Canada
- "The Beast", a nickname for the 2021 Western Kentucky tornado
- The Johns Hopkins Beast, a cybernetic pre-robot developed in the 1960s at Johns Hopkins University

== See also ==
- Beast (disambiguation)
- Mr. Beast (disambiguation)
- Beastie (disambiguation)
- Beastmaster (disambiguation)
- Fiat S76 Record, a car called "The Beast of Turin"
- La Bestia (disambiguation) ("The Beast" in Spanish)
- La Bête (disambiguation) ("The Beast" in French)
