= Beast =

Beast most often refers to:

- Animal, a multicellular, eukaryotic organism in the biological kingdom Animalia
- The Beast (Revelation), one of three beasts described in the Book of Revelation
- Monster, a type of creature found in fiction, folklore, mythology, and religion

Beast or Beasts may also refer to:

== Computing ==
- Beast (card game), English name of historical French game, the first card game to use bidding
- BEAST (computer security), a computer security attack
- BEAST (music composition), a music composition and modular synthesis application that runs under Unix
- Beast (lighting software), a computer-graphics lighting software
- Beast (Trojan horse), a Windows-based backdoor trojan horse

== Arts and media ==
=== Fictional characters ===
- Beast, from the fairy tale Beauty and the Beast
- Beast (Disney character), from the 1991 animated film Beauty and the Beast and sequels
- Beast (Marvel Comics)
- Beast, a minor character in the television series Angel
- Beast, a villain from the television series Doctor Who
- Beast, a television series character from Law & Order: Criminal Intent (season 4)
- Beast, in the television series Maggie and the Ferocious Beast
- Beast Man, in the cartoon He-Man and the Masters of the Universe
- Beastly, a character from the Care Bears franchise
- Beastur, a character in the animated television series My Pet Monster
- Kamen Rider Beast, in Kamen Rider Wizard

=== Films ===
- Beast (2017 film), a British psychological thriller
- Beast (2022 American film), an American thriller directed by Baltasar Kormákur and starring Idris Elba
- Beast (2022 Indian film), an Indian Tamil-language film starring Vijay
- Beast (2026 film), an Australian sports and martial arts action drama

=== Television series ===
- Beast (TV series), a 2000–2001 British sitcom
- Beasts (TV series), a 1976 British horror programme by Nigel Kneale
- Beast Games, a TV show on Prime Video made by MrBeast

=== Literature ===
- Beast (Benchley novel), 1991, by Peter Benchley
- Beast (Kennen novel), 2006, by Ally Kennen
- Beasts (Crowley novel), 1976, by John Crowley
- Beasts (novella), 2001, by Joyce Carol Oates
- Beast, a 2000 novel by Donna Jo Napoli
- Beast, a graphic novel by Marian Churchland, winner of the 2010 Russ Manning Award

=== Music ===
==== Film soundtracks ====
- Beast (soundtrack), from the 2022 Tamil-language film Beast
- Beast (score), 2022 film score of the 2022 Tamil-language film Beast

==== Bands ====
- Beast (Canadian band)
- Beast (South African band)
- Beast (South Korean band)
- Baest, a Danish death metal band

==== Albums ====
- Beast (Beast album) (2008)
- Beast (DevilDriver album) (2011)
- Beast (Magic Dirt album) (2007)
- Beast (Vamps album) (2010)
- Beast (V.I.C. album) (2008)

==== Songs ====
- "Beast" (Chipmunk song) (2008)
- "Beast" (Mia Martina song) (2015)
- "Beast" (Nico Vega song) (2006 EP version, 2013 single)
- "Beast", by Aldous Harding (2014)
- "Beast", by Brymo from 9: Harmattan & Winter (2021)
- "Beast", by Jolin Tsai from Muse (2012)
- "Beast (Southpaw Remix)", by Rob Bailey & The Hustle Standard from the film soundtrack Southpaw (2015)

==== Other uses in music ====
- Birmingham ElectroAcoustic Sound Theatre, a sound diffusion system

=== Other uses in arts and media ===
- BEAST (music composition), a music composition and modular synthesis application that runs under Unix
- Beast (street artist), a contemporary artist from Italy, who produces public artworks of a political nature
- Beast (video game), a 1984 ASCII game
- Professional wrestler Matt Morgan in American Gladiators (stage name "Beast")

== People ==
- Beast (street artist), a contemporary artist from Italy, who produces public artworks of a political nature
- Benjamin Butler (politician) (1813–1893), American politician and Governor of Massachusetts, American Civil War Union Army general nicknamed "Beast Butler"
- Matt Morgan, professional wrestler in American Gladiators, who uses the stage name "Beast"
- Kevin Strahle, a competitive eater nicknamed "L.A. Beast"

== Other uses ==
- Beast (Alton Towers), a roller coaster at Alton Towers, Staffordshire, England
- Beast Lake, a lake in Minnesota, US
- Bengaluru Beast, an Indian basketball team
- Presidential state car (United States), the state car of the President of the United States, nicknamed "The Beast"
- Cyberbeast, brand-name of the tri-motor, all-wheel drive variant of the Tesla Cybertruck

== See also ==
- Beastie (disambiguation)
- Mr. Beast (disambiguation)
- Bestial (album), 1982, by Barrabás
- The Beast (disambiguation)
- Beast Beast, a 2020 coming-of-age drama film
- Beastmaster (disambiguation)
