= 2011 in art =

The year 2011 in art involved various significant events and new works.

== Events ==
- February 28 – Museo Soumaya in Mexico City, designed by Fernando Romero, is officially opened.
- April 3 – The Chinese artist and dissident Ai Weiwei is arrested and detained and his studio sealed off, by the government of the People's Republic of China, during an apparent crackdown by the regime on activists and dissidents. The government later states that Weiwei is being held while investigated for economic crimes.
- April 16 – Turner Contemporary art gallery, designed by David Chipperfield, opens in Margate, Kent, England.
- May 1 – UK publication of @earth.
- May 21 – The Hepworth Wakefield art gallery, designed by David Chipperfield, opens to the public in West Yorkshire, England.
- June – Mougins Museum of Classical Art opens in France.
- June 22 – The Chinese legal authorities release Ai Weiwei on bail after three months' detention, after being charged with alleged tax evasion. His incarceration is widely viewed as an attempt to silence a prominent critic while authorities had time to decide on legal grounds for prosecuting him, and his detention prompts worldwide condemnation of the Chinese government. According to China's Foreign Ministry, he is prohibited from leaving Beijing without permission for one year. After his release Weiwei declines to give interviews saying that he is not allowed to talk.
- September – firstsite's new art gallery, designed by Rafael Viñoly, opens in Colchester, England.
- September 8 – Gerhard Richter Painting, a documentary about the German artist Gerhard Richter, written and directed by Corinna Belz, is released.
- September & October – 2011 Montreal Museum of Fine Arts thefts. In two separate incidents, antique stone pieces are taken from the museum. One was recovered two years later in Edmonton. In 2017, Simon Metke pleaded guilty to possession of stolen goods. The second stolen item has not yet been found.
- October 28 – ArcelorMittal Orbit, designed by Anish Kapoor, is erected at Olympic Park, London.
- November 8 – Rhein II by the German photographer Andreas Gursky sells for US$4.3m (£2.7m) at Christie's, New York becoming the most expensive photograph ever sold.
- November 15 – Ai Weiwei pays 8.45 million yuan in taxes after receiving a large number of donations from supporters who believe the debt was politically motivated because of his criticism of the Chinese government.
- November 28 – The Knoedler art dealership in New York City announces its permanent closure amid revelations that it had been dealing in forged paintings.

== Exhibitions ==
- February 13 until June 6 - Picasso's Guitars 1912-1924 (curated by Anne Umland) at MoMA in New York City
- February 24 – June 5 – Thomas Lawrence: "Regency Power and Brilliance", Yale Center for British Art, New Haven, Connecticut
- April 12 – September 11 – "The Luminous Interval: The Dimitris Daskalopoulos Collection at the Guggenheim Bilbao
- April 14 – July 15 – "Picasso and Marie-Thérèse: L’amour Fou", curated by John Richardson and Diana Widmaier Picasso, at the Gagosian Gallery, 522 West 21st Street in New York City
- May 4 – August 7 – Alexander McQueen: Savage Beauty Metropolitan Museum of Art in New York City
- June 4 – November 27 – Julian Schnabel: "Permanently Becoming and the Architecture of Seeing" curated by Norman Rosenthal, Museo Correr, Venice, Italy
- June 9 - July 31 - Berrisford Boothe: That Which is Necessary and Available at Lafayette College in Easton, Pennsylvania
- June 29 – September 25 – Twombly – Poussin, Arcadian Painters at the Dulwich Picture Gallery in London
- September 18 (to January 9, 2012) – "de Kooning: A Retrospective", Museum of Modern Art, New York
- November 9 (to February 5, 2012) – "Leonardo da Vinci, Painter at the Court of Milan", National Gallery, London

== Works ==
- Douwe Blumberg - "America's Response Monument (De Oppresso Liber)" installed at Liberty Park, World Trade Center in New York City (conceived and executed small scale 2003 - cast and dedicated as a monumental sculpture 2011)
- Louise Bourgeois and Peter Zumthor - the Steilneset Memorial in Vardo, Norway
- Maurizio Cattelan
  - L.O.V.E. (sculpture)
  - Turisti (installation, second version)
- Isaac Cordal - Politicians Discussing Global Warming (sculpture - Berlin)
- Martin Creed – Work No 1059: Scotsman Steps (Edinburgh)
- Tracey Emin – Love Is What You Want
- Floc'h – Déjeuner sur l'herbe revisited
- Lee Kelly – Moontrap, Oregon City, Oregon
- Lei Yixin – Statue of Martin Luther King Jr. at the Martin Luther King Jr. Memorial in Washington, D.C.
- Mark Patterson – Surfing Madonna (Encinitas, California)
- Ed Ruscha - Psycho Spaghetti Western #7 (completed)
- John Howard Sanden – President George W. Bush
- Lorna Simpson – Momentum (video)
- Valentina Stefanovska – Warrior on a Horse (Skopje)
- Henry Taylor - Warning Shots not Required
- The Red Popsicle, Seattle

== Films ==
- The Mill and the Cross (inspired by Pieter Bruegel the Elder's 1564 painting The Procession to Calvary), starring Rutger Hauer as Bruegel

== Awards ==
- Archibald Prize – Ben Quilty for "Margaret Olley"
- Venice Biennale (June 4 – November 27)
  - The Lion d'or (Golden Lion) for best national pavilion-Germany exhibiting the work of Christoph Schlingensief
  - The Lion d'or for lifetime achievement – Franz West and Sturtevant
  - The Lion d'or for best artwork in the main exhibition – Christian Marclay
  - The Silver Lion for most promising new artist – Haroon Mirza

== Deaths ==
- January 4 – B. H. Friedman, 84, writer, author of the first biography on Jackson Pollock
- January 5 – Malangatana Ngwenya, 74, Mozambican painter and poet
- January 9 – Makinti Napanangka, 80s, indigenous Australian Papunya Tula artist
- January 11 – Won-il Rhee, 50, South Korean digital art curator
- January 13 – Ellen Stewart, 91, founder of La MaMa E.T.C., New York, designer
- January 20 – Alan Uglow, 69, British born American painter
- January 21 – Dennis Oppenheim, 72, American sculptor
- February 4 - Françoise Cachin, 74, French art, historian, and museum director (Musée d'Orsay)
- February 8 – Charles O. Perry, 81, American sculptor
- February 11 – Roy Gussow, 92, American sculptor
- February 25 – Suze Rotolo, 67, American book artist
- March 10 – Gabriel Laderman, 81, American painter
- March 13 – Leo Steinberg, 90, American art historian and critic
- March 27 – George Tooker, 90, American painter
- March 30 – Jorge Camacho, 77, Cuban painter
- April 8
  - John McCracken, 76, American sculptor and painter
  - Hedda Sterne, 100, Romanian born American painter
- April 12 – Miroslav Tichý, 84, Czech photographer
- May 13 – Stephen De Staebler, 79, American sculptor and printmaker
- May 18 – Wlodzimierz Ksiazek, 60, Polish born American painter (body found on this date)
- May 25 – Leonora Carrington, 94, British born surrealist painter, resident in Mexico
- June 4 – Claudio Bravo, 74, Chilean painter
- June 9 – M. F. Husain, 95, Indian painter
- June 11 – Jack Smith, 82, British painter
- June 16 – Twins Seven Seven, 67, Nigerian painter and sculptor
- June 20 – Thomas N. Armstrong III, 78, American curator and museum director (Whitney Museum of American Art and the Andy Warhol Museum)
- June 22 – Robert Miller, 72, American gallerist
- July 5 – Cy Twombly, 83, American painter
- July 17 – Alex Steinweiss, 94, American graphic designer, inventor of the album cover
- July 20 – Lucian Freud, 88, British painter
- July 31 – John Hoyland, 76, British painter
- August 4 – Éamonn O'Doherty, 72, Irish sculptor
- August 6 – Roman Opałka, 79, French-born Polish painter
- August 21 – Budd Hopkins, 80, American painter
- August 23 – Jeanette Ingberman, 59, American curator, co-founder of Exit Art
- September 5 – Vann Nath, 66, Cambodian painter
- September 13 – Richard Hamilton, 89, British painter
- September 16 – Stephen Mueller, 63, American painter
- September 22 – Knut Steen, 86, Norwegian-born sculptor
- October 22 - Adrian Berg, 82, English painter
- October 24 – Bruno Weber, 80, Swiss artist and architect
- November 13 – Pat Passlof, 83, American painter
- November 23 – Gerald Laing, 75, British painter and sculptor
- November 26 – Manon Cleary, 69, American painter
- December 8 – Jerry Robinson, 89, American comic book artist and reputed creator of the Joker
- December 21 – John Chamberlain, 84, American sculptor
- December 26 – James Rizzi, 61, American pop artist
- December 27 – Helen Frankenthaler, 83, American painter
- December 30
  - Ronald Searle, 91, English cartoonist
  - Eva Zeisel, 105, Hungarian-born American ceramic artist and designer
