= Beastie =

Beastie may refer to:

== Entertainment ==
- Beastie (Alton Towers), a roller coaster previously located at Alton Towers in Staffordshire, England
- The Beastie (Kings Island), a previous name for the Woodstock Express roller coaster located at Kings Island in Mason, Ohio
- The Beastie (Wonderland Sydney), a roller coaster that previously existed at Wonderland Sydney in Australia
- The Beasties, a nickname for the hip hop musical group Beastie Boys
- Beastie, a female professional wrestler from the Gorgeous Ladies of Wrestling
- "Beastie", a song by Jethro Tull from Broadsword and the Beast

=== Fiction ===
- Beasties (film), a 1989 comedy horror film
- The Beasties (book), a 2010 children's book by Jenny Nimmo
- The Beasties (novel), a 1997 young-adult novel by William Sleator
- Beasties, a type of creature in the role-playing game Changeling: The Dreaming
- Beast Wars (Canadian title: Beasties), a Transformers toy line and animated television series
- Beastie Girls, 2017 South Korean drama film directed by Sin Ji-woo

== Other uses ==
- Beastie (mascot), the BSD Daemon, mascot of the BSD operating system
- The Beasties, a collective name for the alcopop brand Wee Beastie

== See also ==
- Beast (disambiguation)
- Bestie (disambiguation)
- The Beast (disambiguation)
- The Beastmaster, a 1982 sword and sorcery film
