= La Bestia (disambiguation) =

La Bestia commonly refers to a network of Mexican freight trains used by migrants to travel to the United States.

La Bestia (Spanish for "The Beast") may also refer to:

- La Bestia del Ring, Mexican professional wrestler
- Luis Garavito, Colombian serial killer
- Médico Asesino, Mexican professional wrestler who at one point used the ring name La Bestia
- La Bestia (Mola novel), a 2021 novel by the pseudonymous Spanish writer Carmen Mola

== See also ==
- Bestia (disambiguation)
- The Beast (disambiguation)
- La Bête (disambiguation) (French for "The Beast")
