= Prehistoric beast =

Prehistoric beast may refer to:

- Prehistoric Beast, a ten-minute experimental animated film by Phil Tippett
- Any animal alive during prehistory, the time period before recorded history
  - In particular, prehistoric megafauna, such as mammoths or dinosaurs

== See also ==
- Beast (disambiguation)
- Monster, a type of grotesque creature
