= Darth Vader building (disambiguation) =

Darth Vader building most often refers to the Fourth and Blanchard Building in Seattle, Washington.

Darth Vader building may also refer to:

- Hitachi Building, in Brisbane, California
- I. M. Pei's penthouse addition to the Lamar Building, in Augusta, Georgia

== See also ==
- Darth Vader grotesque, on the Washington National Cathedral, Washington, D.C
