= Bestia =

Bestia can refer to:

- Bestia (1917 film), Polish silent film
- Bestia (2021 film), Chilean short film
- Bestia (game), Italian card game
- Bestia 666 (b. 1989), Mexican wrestler
- Bestia (plant), genus of moss
- Calpurnii Bestiae, ancient Romans

== See also ==
- Beast (disambiguation)
- La Bestia (disambiguation)
