= Walter P. Lewisohn =

American explorer and documentary film maker

Walter Pickett Lewisohn was a member of the Lewisohn family of New York. He was an explorer and took part in several expeditions including to Antarctica.

== Early life ==
Walter Pickett Lewisohn was born on 10 September 1910 in Long Branch, New Jersey to Walter Lewisohn and Selma Kraus. He was the grandson of philanthropist Leonard Lewisohn.

In 1924 his father was committed to Blythewood Sanatorium as insane. This came following heavy losses in his business and the involvement of both his parents in a murder investigation into the death of Joseph B. Elwell who was found dead having dined at the Lewisohn's. Walter Lewisohn Sr. died on 31 May 1938, still confined to the sanatorium.

For a time Lewison Jr. and his mother lived at the Plaza Hotel in Manhattan. She remarried in 1928 to Henry Bartow Farr and died on 31 May 1957.

== Education and career ==
In the summer of 1930, Walter took part in a month cruise to the West Indies on the Mopelia hosted by Count Felix von Luckner. The ship embarked on Tuesday 31 June 1930 from 79th Street (Manhattan) Dock on the Hudson River.

From 1931 to 1932, Walter studied archaeology at the University of Wisconsin. In 1938, he went on to study at the Yale Drama School.

He travelled as part of a George Miller Dyott expedition to Ecuador in 1932, returning in 1933 after 5 months. The aim of the trip was to study the native populations and to survey for agricultural development.

Walter also participated in Donald Baxter MacMillan's expedition to Baffin Island and two archaeological digs in the South West of the USA, including one in 1932 at the Jemez site in Santa Fe, New Mexico.

From 1933 to 1934, Walter was a member of Richard E. Byrd's 2nd Antarctic Expedition and kept a meticulous diary. He was hired as the archaeologist but performed several roles including photographer and radio operator. The expedition was significant as it demonstrated that Antarctica was one continent. Additionally, the expedition provided the first human voice broadcast from Antarctica, the first seismic observations from Antarctica, and the first cosmic ray observation. He kept a diary throughout the expedition, which was recently sold for $32500.00.

From around 1935, Lewisohn became a documentary film maker. He worked particularly with Associates Documentary Films for Educational Purposes in New York City and with Cinavision. He was described in 1956 as "one of America's leading makers of documentary films". He made a group of films referred to as his American Heritage Series which documents the life of indigenous Americans and was produced by filming in museums and with Native American communities.

== Later life ==
He died on 18 February 1991 in the Royal Borough of Kensington and Chelsea.

== Personal life ==
Walter married Dolina Katherine McKenzie Williamson of Edinburgh on 15 March 1935 in Wellington. They had one son, Ian born in New York City on 27 May 1940. The couple divorced on 19 June 1942 with Dolina citing "cruelty" as the reason.

== Legacy ==
Several of his items are held in the archives of the Explorers Club and the Special Collections of the J.D. Williams Library at the University of Mississippi).

A Nunatak in the Marie Byrd Land was named after him by the United States Antarctic Service.
