= Jérôme Catz =

French art curator

Jérome Catz (born 1969), is an independent French curator. He is also the current director of the Spacejunk Art Centers.

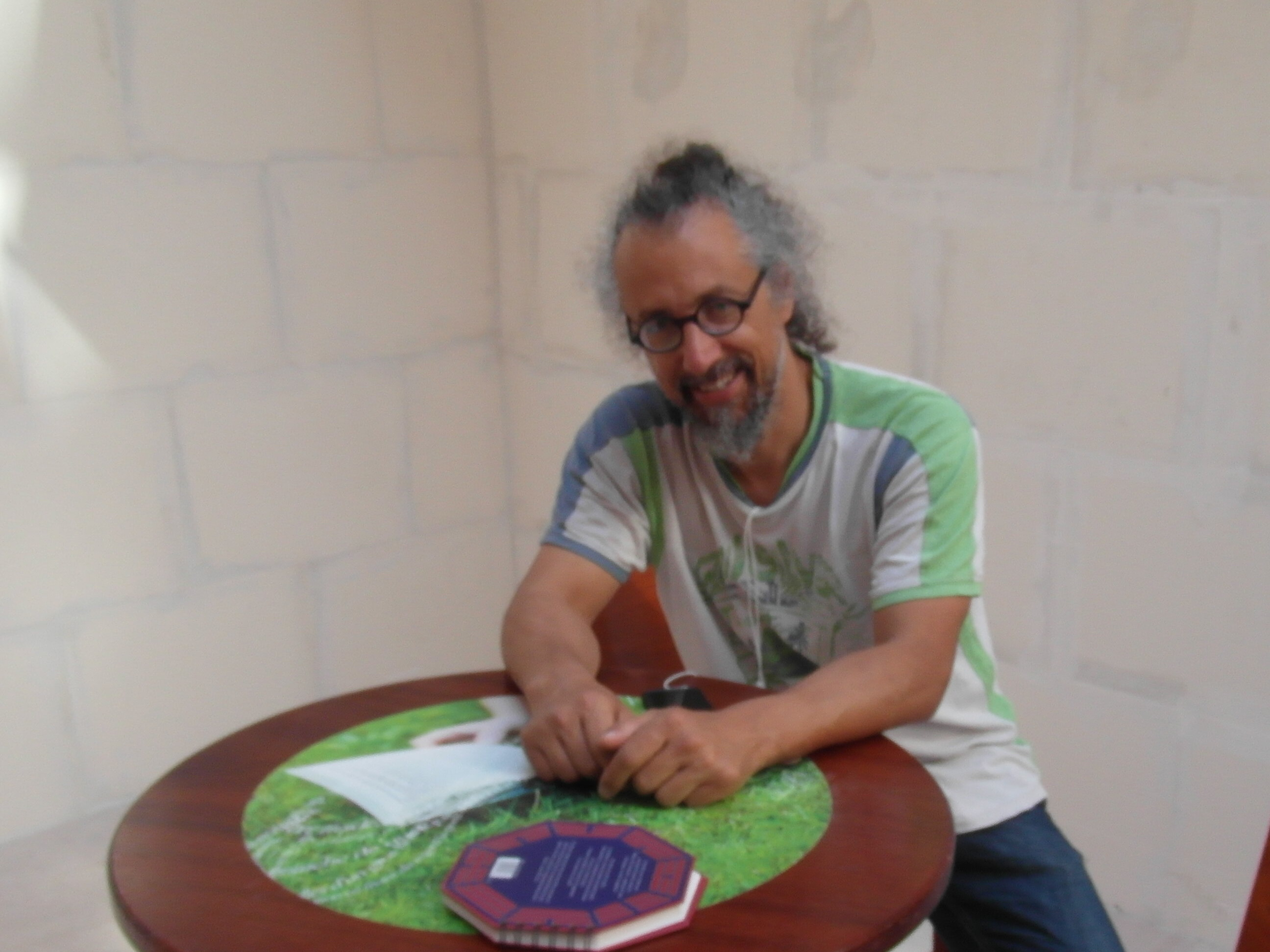
Jérome Catz, is an independent French curator.

== Biography ==
He comes from the background of board sports. He was a professional freeride snowboarder from 1992 to 2003, and he collaborated with the French winter sports brand Rossignol throughout his entire athletic career. The brand backed him in 2003 when he opened his first Spacejunk art center in Grenoble, France, a place dedicated to exhibiting artists from Board Culture, Lowbrow and Pop Surrealism.

A specialist in these movements, Jérôme Catz opened a second center in 2005 in Bourg-Saint-Maurice - in the Savoie area of France. In 2006 he curated the Art on Foam exhibition, which toured the globe through 2008, inviting twenty-two artists including Dave Kinsey, Lucy McLauchlan, Adam Neate and Andy Howell.

In 2007 a third Spacejunk Art Center was born in Bayonne, and in 2009 another in Lyon. Today Spacejunk exhibits artists from around the world - such as Travis Parr, Will Barras, Jon Fox, Steph COP or Scott Bourne.

Since the beginning of Spacejunk, the art center's aim is to connect artists and audience, and to make the meeting possible. This aspect of their work has developed even further today with their outreach activities in schools all the way from pre-schools to universities.

In 2011, Jérôme Catz curated the exhibition Les Enfants Terribles, which brought together twelve of the most important artists in the Lowbrow and Pop Surrealist movements from around the world, featuring Todd Schorr, Robert Williams, Ray Caesar, Jeff Soto, Nicolas Thomas, Caia Koopman, Victor Castillo, Reg Mombassa, Odö, Naoto Hattori, Joe Sorren and Robert Crumb.

In 2013, he wrote the book “Street Art Mode d'Emploi” which was published in France. The book was reissued in 2014, at the same time as its English version, “Talk About Street Art”, was released by Thames & Hudson.

In 2015 an updated version of the book “Street Art Mode d'Emploi” was released under the title “Street Art le Guide”, at Flammarion.

On October 4, 2014, Jérome Catz signed the exhibition “#StreetArt” at the Espace Fondation EDF in Paris. Subtitled "Innovation at the Heart of a Movement", it explored the use of new technologies by the street artists, and offered a richly documented historical section. A digital catalog was published for the occasion. Among the artists presented were Isaac Cordal, Vhils, C215, Slinkachu, Rézine, Ron English, Zevs, Shepard Fairey, JR, Sweza, Truly Design, BenTo, Patrick Suchet and Antonin Fourneau. In five months, the exhibition welcomed 113,228 visitors before being presented from April 24 to August 30 at the EDF Electropolis Museum in Mulhouse.

This exhibition continued to tour in Zagreb, Croatia, from September 26 to November 29, 2015, during “Rendez-Vous, Festival de la France en Croatia” and as part of the Art Rock festival, from May 10 to 28, 2016 in Saint-Brieuc, France.

It was also on this occasion that he mounted the exhibition "Obey to Music, A Visual Tribute to Music by Shepard Fairey", at the Musée de Saint-Brieuc with more than 250 original serigraphs by the artist, mainly dating from 1995 to 2012 and presented together for the first time in the world.

In 2015, he launched the first edition of “Grenoble Street Art Fest”, a street art festival held for four weeks in the heart of Grenoble, France. During the second edition the festival took off on the international scene by hosting key artists such as Ernest Pignon-Ernest (FR), Anthony Lister (AUS), Augustine Kofie (USA), Isaac Cordal (Sp), C215, Goin, Will Barras (UK), Max Zorn, Animalitoland, Never Crew, Monkey Bird, Van Hillick Veks, Beast and many more.

In 2017 the third edition of “Grenoble Street Art Fest” welcomes international artists such as American How & Nosm, Chinese DALeast, French Seth, Veks Van Hillick, Monkey Bird, Snek, Goin and many others, the Canadian ZekOne and Ankhone from the collective A'Shop. The first edition of “Street Art MOVIE Fest” was launched to present cinematographic works and videos dedicated to the discipline of urban arts.

That same year, he signed the retrospective of the work of the artist Shepard Fairey for the Department of Herault in Montpellier, France: “Obey, the Propaganda Art of Shepard Fairey” in the Pierresvives building designed by Zaha Hadid. This first retrospective in Europe presented more than 250 works, most of which date from 1996 to 2008.

In 2018, the fourth edition of the Grenoble Street Art Fest welcomed artists Sainer (Pl), Sebas Velasco (Sp), Pantonio (Ptg), Mademoiselle Maurice (Fr), Isaac Cordal (Sp), Veks Van Hillik (Fr), Maye & Mommies (Fr), Goin, Suiko (Jp), Animalitoland (Arg), Cuore (Arg), Lapiz (Ger), Piet Rodriguez (Be), Snek (Fr), Serty31 (Fr), Etien' (Fr), Nesta & Short79 (Fr), Sony (SA), Sampsa and many others among the local street art scene.

In 2019, the “Grenoble Street Art Fest” changed its name to “Street Art Fest Grenoble-Alpes” for its 5th edition because, according to Jérome Catz, "considering the metropolitan influence of the festival, it seemed important to me to change its name so as not to limit Grenoble to its intramuros" because from year to year some cities of the agglomeration (Fontaine, Pont-de-Claix and Saint-Martin-d'Hères) have joined the city of Grenoble to host murals and events. This 5th edition welcomed the star artist Shepard Fairey (USA), as well as the following artists: Bezt (Pl), Augustine Fofie (USA), Robert Proch (Pl), 1010 (Ger), Dulk1 (Es), Li-Hill (Can), WD (Bali), PichiAvo (Es), Goin, Veks Van Hillik (Fr), Nean (Be), Izzy (Md), Beast (It), LPVDA (CH), Monk (Be), MC Baldassari (Can), Softtwix (Fr), Juietta XLF (Es), Petite Poissone (Fr), Ekis and Boye (Fr), Imer (Fr), Groek (Fr), Nesta & Short 79 (Fr), Srek & Will ( Fr), Danay (Fr), Snek (Fr), Tawos (Fr). Numerous exhibitions was put in place, including the largest ever retrospective in the world of Shepard Fairey's work "Obey: 30 years of Resistance".

In 2020, despite the COVID-19 pandemic and the related uncertainties, his team and he decide to maintain the 6th edition of the Street Art Fest Grenoble-Alpes. The 2020 edition will be carried by the festival team over the period of 6 months, enabling a long-term cultural activity in the city and its surroundings, engaging the following artists: Inti (Chile), Brusk (France), Simon Berger (Switzerland), Reskate Art & Kraft (Spain), Never Crew (Switzerland), Yann Chatelin (France / Morocco), L'Enfant Libre (France), Telmo & Miel (Netherlands), Philibert (France), Viktoria Veisbrut (Russia), Rosie Woods (UK), Iota (Belgium), Combo (France), Otist (France), Muz Mural Media (France), Snek (France), LPVDA (Switzerland), Marco Lallemant (France), Petite Poissone (France), Piet Rodriguez (Belgium), Srek & Will (France), Cobie (France), Votour (France) and M4U (France).

2021 marks the 7th edition of Street Art Fest Grenoble-Alpes - the second in times of covid. While Covid travel restrictions are still in place, he manages to invite numerous artists, including those from abroad. These are: Hoxxoh and Augustine Kofie, from the U.S., Iota, from Belgium, Peeta, Vesod and Alberto Ruce, from Italy, Taquen, Lula Goce and Manomatic, from Spain, Leon Keer, Telmo and Miel, from the Netherlands, Violent, from Portugal, LPVDA, from Switzerland, Li-Hill, from Canada, Satr from China, as well as the French: , EZK, Juin, Groek, Etien', Falco, Ekis & Boye, Otist and Petite Poissone. That same year, he was listed, by Traits Urbains magazine, among “The 100 who make the city”.

== Exhibitions (selection) ==
- Art on Foam
- Les enfants TERRIBLES

== Publications ==
- 2004 : Spacejunk Year Book 1 - éditions Spacejunk
- 2005 : Spacejunk Year Book 2 - éditions Spacejunk
- 2006 : Spacejunk Year Book 3 - éditions Spacejunk
- 2007 : Spacejunk Year Book 4 - éditions Spacejunk
- 2008 : Nicolas Thomas - éditions Spacejunk
- 2008 : Spacejunk Year Book 5 - éditions Spacejunk
- 2009 : Spacejunk Artist Catalogue: Marcel Breuer - Hommage - éditions Spacejunk
- 2009 : Spacejunk Year Book 6 - éditions Spacejunk
- 2010 : Spacejunk Year Book 7 - éditions Spacejunk
- 2011 : Spacejunk Year Book 8 - éditions Spacejunk
- 2012 : Les Enfants Terribles - éditions Spacejunk
- 2013 : Spacejunk Artist Catalogue: Nicolas Le Borgne - éditions Spacejunk
- 2013 : Street Art Mode d'Emploi2 - éditions Flammarion
- 2014 : GOIN: I spray for you - éditions Critères
- 2014 : Talk About Street Art - Thames & Hudson
- 2014 : #StreetArt20 - Fondation EDF Exhibition catalog (ibook - free)
- 2015 : Street Art le Guide - éditions Flammarion
- 2018 : Grenoble Street Art Fest 1, 2 & 3 - éditions Spacejunk
- 2019 : The Resistance Time - édition Spacejunk

== Articles ==
- (in French) Artravel - September 2006
- (in English) Huck - April 2009
- (in French) Surfer's journal - February 2010
- (in French) Acteurs de l'économie - June 2010
- (in French) Liberation September 2014
- (in French)Télérama
- (in French) Le Monde
- (in French) France 3
- (in French) Traits Urbains - November 2021

== See also ==
- Lowbrow (art movement)
