= La Bestia =

Mexican freight trains used by migrants

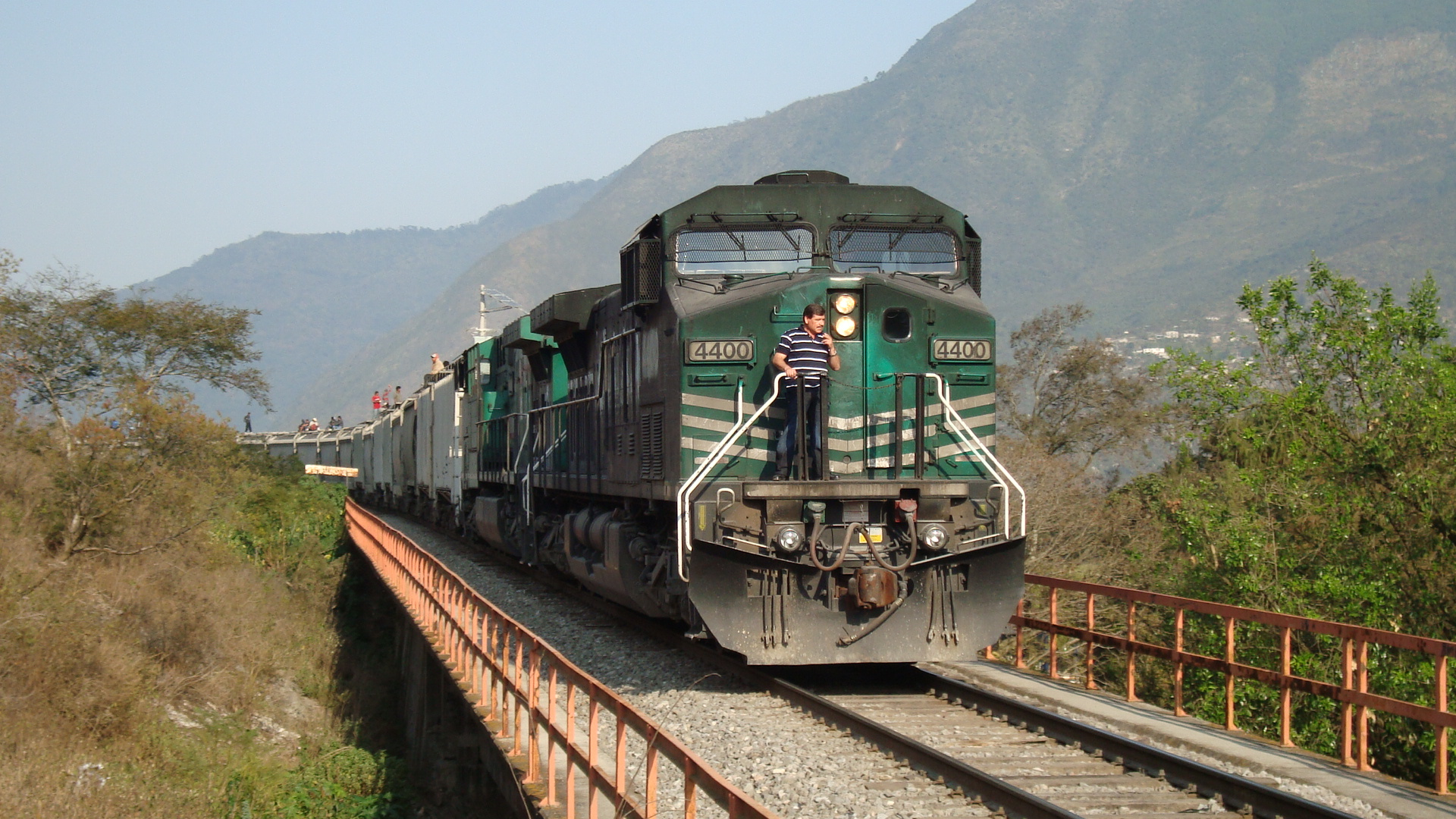
Ferrosur train in Veracruz

La Bestia ("The Beast"), also known as El Tren de la Muerte ("The Train of Death") and El Tren de los Desconocidos ("The Train of the Unknowns"), is the nickname for the freight trains that start their route in southern Mexico, near Guatemalan border, and travel north to the outskirts of Mexico City, where they connect with other freight trains heading to different points along the Mexico–U.S. border. It is estimated that each year, between 400,000 and 500,000 migrants, the majority of whom are from El Salvador, Guatemala, and Honduras, ride atop these trains in an effort to reach the United States. Although these trains (which transport products and materials including corn, cement, and minerals) are regarded as a free form of travel that allows migrants to avoid Mexico's numerous immigration checkpoints and 48 detention centers, the risks are high and many riders are left with life-altering injuries that limit their capacity to work.

As of May 9, 2014, train operators have banned passengers from traveling on the train.

== Passenger risks ==
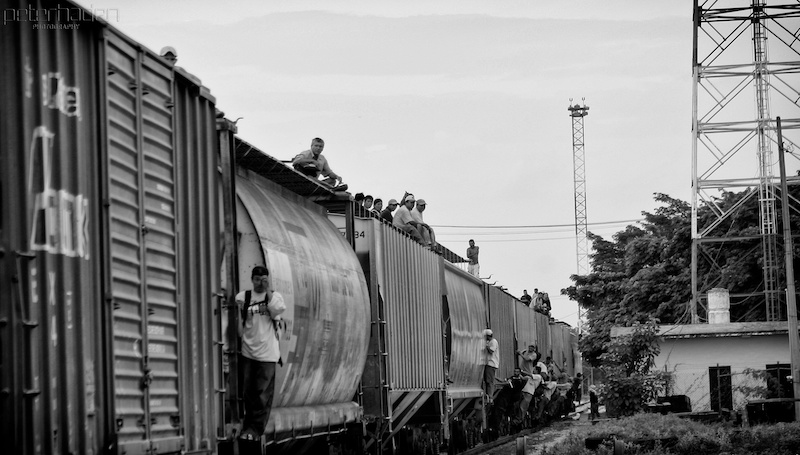
Riders on top of the train

Many of the dangers posed by this journey result from the train itself and the process of climbing aboard and getting off moving trains. Because migrants board between 10 and 15 trains during their 1,450-mile (2,330 km) journey, which typically begins in Arriaga, Chiapas, the chances of sustaining a major injury are high before they even arrive at the Lecherías station in Mexico City, which serves as a sort of halfway point before the train route scatters into various directions that head closer to different points on the U.S. border. Often, migrants fell asleep while riding atop trains and they were jolted off or pushed off by other migrants or freight workers intentionally and onto the tracks where many were killed instantly by decapitation, crushing, blood loss, and shock. Because accidents often occur during the night and in rural areas, victims were often not found immediately or were never found nor identified.

As with all migrant routes, those who use freight trains are subject to high rates of violence and property crime. Mexican states crossed by the freight trains also experience very high rates of kidnapping and murder by cartels. Due to fears of deportation and revenge, the actual rates of such crimes are higher and worse than reported.

In 2023, Ferromex, one of the largest freight rail companies in Mexico, suspended operations of more than 60 trains to protect the safety of migrants, as thousands of migrants were attempting to ride the trains and putting their own lives at risk to make across the border into the US.

== Reactions by citizens and the Mexican government ==
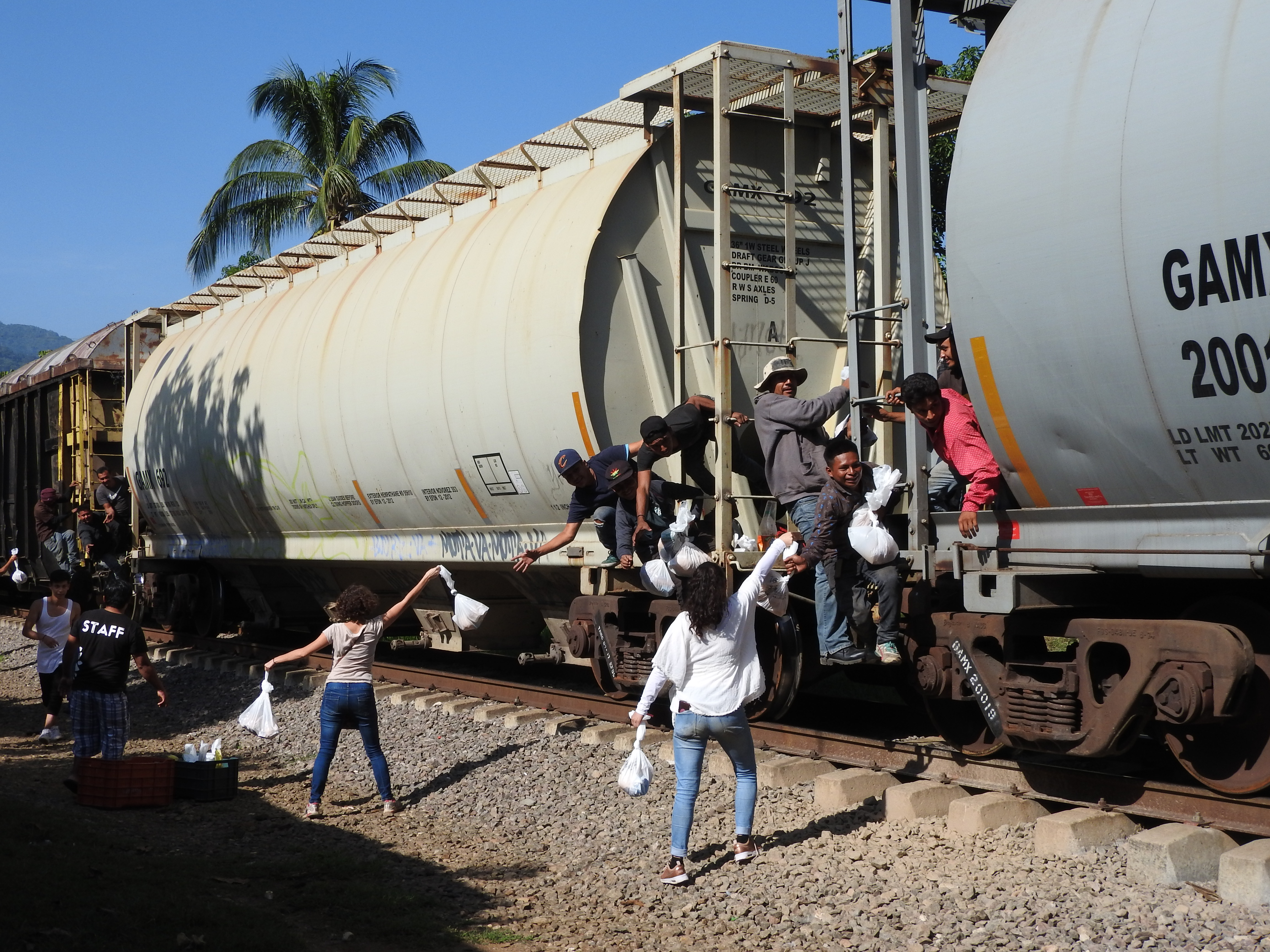
Migrants on La Bestia being passed bags of food and water

Many Central American migrants receive aid from Mexican families and community members who provide migrants with food, shelter, clothes, and medicine despite their own poverty. One such group is Las Patronas in Veracruz. Shelter of Jesus the Good Shepherd for the Poor and Migrant has received U.S. and Australian government aid to support migrants who use La Bestia and are frequently maimed by it.

A government support service, called Grupos Beta, was also created to help migrants. Often, Grupos Beta members ride along the train tracks and visit rest stops, where they provide medical aid and information to migrants. Essentially, they function as a "mobile humanitarian unit [that] does not enforce the law." Their purpose is not to convince migrants to not ride the trains to the border, rather their goal is simply to educate migrants about how to protect themselves throughout their journey. Apart from Grupos Beta, the Mexican Government has been criticized for its relaxed approach to the countless instances of rights violations and abuses regarding Central American migrants.

== Media coverage ==
"El Tren de la Muerte" has been depicted in literature, news articles, and in films and documentaries.

Which Way Home is a 2009 documentary that follows the stories of children who have left their homes to go to the United States. The children, aged from 9 to 15, come from various countries such as Guatemala, Honduras, El Salvador, and Mexico. They are unaccompanied, and the documentary focuses on the dangers of the trip, showing what happens to the children who fail to reach their destination and are returned to their countries of origin. Many of the other films about the train, such as the 2005 documentary De Nadie ("About no one") and the 2009 thriller Sin nombre ("Nameless"), tell similar stories.

Salvadoran journalist Óscar Martínez's book The Beast also depicts the hardships faced by migrants on their train journey to the United States.

American author Jeanine Cummins's novel American Dirt tells the story of several migrants who ride "La Bestia" through Mexico on their journey to the United States, and the difficulties they face along the way.

The train was also featured in Al Jazeera America's 2014 Borderland.

We Are Not from Here, a young adult book written by American author Jenny Torres Sanchez, depicts three unaccompanied teenagers from Guatemala taking the train in the search of safety and in hope of a better life.

In 2023, the YouTubers Bald and Bankrupt and Timmy Karter posted to their respective channels episodes called "Riding The World's Deadliest Train: The Beast" and "Surviving the Migrant Death Train to the US Border!" where they travelled alongside families trying to reach the US.

== See also ==
- 2013 Tabasco train derailment
- Shelter of Jesus the Good Shepherd for the Poor and Migrant
