= Bridge whist =

Name for the earliest form of Bridge

Bridge whist and straight bridge are retronyms coined to distinguish the earliest form of bridge from later forms that included bidding.

Bridge whist was a form of Russian whist known as biritch or britch around the Eastern Mediterranean, in which, instead of a simple auction as in Yeralash, the dealer declared a trump suit or notrump and played partner's hand as Dummy.

The earliest rules for biritch were published in 1886 in England by John Collinson, a railway engineer and financier who played the game in Constantinople with Russian emigres in the 1880s. The form of bridge played in Paris in the 1890s, which quickly replaced whist in clubs of New York and England, was the same as Collinson's except that 1 notrump scored twelve points per trick instead of ten.

== See also ==
- History of contract bridge
- THE LAWS OF BRIDGE (1904)
