= 2013 Tabasco train derailment =

Railway incident in the Mexican state of Tabasco

- Location within Tabasco Location within Mexico

Details
- Date: 25 August 2013
- Location: Huimanguillo, Tabasco
- Coordinates: 17°49′N 93°23′W
- Country: Mexico

Statistics
- Trains: 1
- Passengers: 300
- Deaths: 12
- Injured: at least 22

The 2013 Tabasco train derailment occurred on 25 August 2013 after the freight train "La Bestia", with 300 passengers on board, was derailed in Huimanguillo, Tabasco. The accident killed 12 people and another 22 were injured, 16 of them were in grave condition.

== Background ==
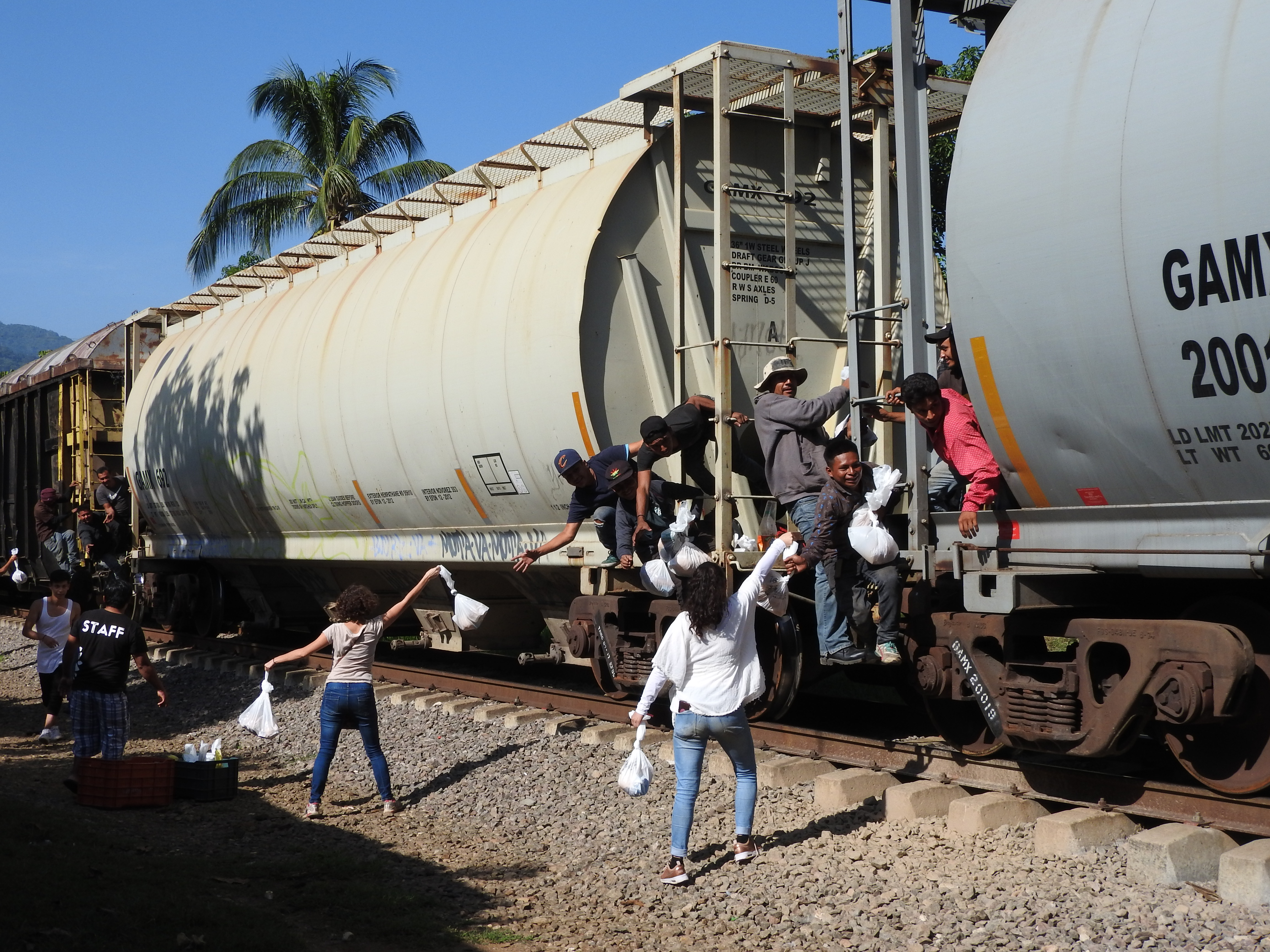
Migrants on La Bestia being passed bags of food and water

The freight train, transporting corn, cement, and minerals from Arriaga to Lechería railway station, was known for carrying migrants from Central America to the United States, as freighthopping on the train allowed migrants to avoid Mexican immigration checkpoints and detention centers.

== Accident ==
The freight train derailed around 3:00 am on Sunday, 25 August 2013, when 8 of the 12 cars were overturned.

== Aftermath ==
Ambulances were unable to reach the area due to the difficult terrain. At least 12 were confirmed dead by the end of August after the removal of the train remnants. The accident is believed to have been caused by the shifted tracks caused by the hard rain.

In 2014, train operators banned passengers from traveling on the train.
