= The Red Popsicle =

2011 sculpture by Catherine Mayer

- The sculpture in 2022
- Artist: Catherine Mayer
- Year: 2011
- Location: Seattle, Washington, U.S.
- 47°36′51.9″N 122°20′33.6″W

The Red Popsicle (also known as Giant Red Twin Popsicle or simply Popsicle) is a 2011 sculpture by Catherine Mayer, installed in Seattle's Belltown neighborhood, in the U.S. state of Washington.

== Description and history ==
The 17-foot steel and epoxy artwork was installed at the intersection of Fourth and Blanchard outside the building of the same name in early June 2011.

== Reception ==
Christina Ausley of the Seattle Post-Intelligencer described the sculpture as "public pop art that looks good enough to eat, but sadly is not". The newspaper also included the artwork in a 2021 list of "24 of Seattle's quirkiest landmarks". Bradley Foster included the sculpture in Thrillist's 2014 list of "10 secret Seattle things you didn't know existed". Sean Keeley and Sarah Anne Lloyd included the work in Curbed Seattle's 2019 list of "30 notable public art spots in Seattle".

== See also ==
- 2011 in art
