= The Beast (nickname) =

The Beast is a nickname which may refer to:

- Calvin Abueva (born 1988), Filipino basketball player
- Adhiban Baskaran (born 1992), Indian chess Grandmaster
- Adebayo Akinfenwa (born 1982), English football player
- Júlio Baptista (born 1981), Brazilian football player
- Yohan Blake (born 1989), Jamaican sprinter
- Aleister Crowley (1875–1947), English occultist, ceremonial magician, poet, painter, novelist, and mountaineer
- Jimmie Foxx (1907–1967), American Major League Baseball player, member of the Hall of Fame
- Eddie Hall (born 1988), British strongman
- Braden Holtby (born 1989), Canadian ice hockey goaltender
- Kevin Iro (born 1968), New Zealand rugby league footballer
- Brian Jensen (footballer born 1975), Danish footballer
- Sretko Kalinić (born 1974), Serbian criminal
- Mark Labbett (born 1965), British television personality on the game show The Chase
- L.A. Beast (Kevin Strahle), competitive eater.
- Brock Lesnar (born 1977), professional wrestler
- Maria Mandl (1912–1948), Austrian World War II concentration camp leader
- Hildegard Mende (1922–?), German World War II concentration camp guard
- Max Mirnyi (born 1977), professional tennis player from Belarus
- Tendai Mtawarira (born 1985), Zimbabwean-born South Africa rugby player
- John Mugabi (born 1960), Ugandan retired middleweight boxer and world junior middleweight champion
- Miguel Ángel Nadal (born 1966), Spanish retired footballer
- Jon Parkin (born 1981), English football player
- Shang Ping (born 1984), first Chinese basketball player to join a Euroleague club
- Dan Severn (born 1958), American professional wrestler and mixed martial artist
- Daigo Umehara (born 1981), Japanese arcade fighting video game player
- Manu Vatuvei (born 1986), New Zealand rugby league footballer
- Gustav Wagner (1911–1980), Austrian SS-Oberscharführer at Sobibór extermination camp, "The Beast"

== See also ==
- The Beast (disambiguation)
- Mr Beast, studio album by the Scottish post-rock group Mogwai
- MrBeast (born 1998), American YouTuber
- Benjamin Butler (politician) (1813–1893), American politician and Governor of Massachusetts, American Civil War Union Army general nicknamed "Beast Butler" by Southern whites
- Irma Grese (1923–1945), German World War II female concentration camp guard, "The Beast of Belsen" and "The Beautiful Beast"
- Reinhard Heydrich (1904–1942), high-ranking German Nazi official, "The Blonde Beast"
- Ilse Koch (1906–1967), German World War II female concentration camp guard, "The Beast of Buchenwald"
- Josef Kramer (1906–1945), German commandant of Bergen-Belsen concentration camp, "The Beast of Belsen"
- Salvatore Riina (born 1930), former Sicilian Mafia leader nicknamed "La Belva" ("The Beast")
- Luis Garavito (born 1957), Colombian serial killer and rapist nicknamed "La Bestia" ("The Beast")
- Siert Bruins (born 1921), Dutch member of the SS and SD during World War II, "The Beast of Appingedam"
- Dennis Skinner (born 1932), British politician, "The Beast of Bolsover"
- Nuno Mindelis (born 1957), Angolan-born Brazilian blues guitarist and singer-songwriter, "The Beast from Brazil"
- Edward Paisnel (1925–1994), sex offender from the Channel Island of Jersey, "the beast of Jersey"
- Anatoly Onoprienko (1959–2013), Ukrainian serial killer, "The Beast of Ukraine"
- Maxi Rodríguez (born 1981), Argentine footballer, "La fiera" ("The beast")
- Álvaro Negredo (born 1985), Spanish football player, "La fiera de Vallecas" ("The beast of Vallecas")
- Gaius Antonius Hybrida, Roman Republic 1st century BC politician, nicknamed "Hybrida" ("half-beast")
- The Animal (nickname)
