= Eralash (card game) =

Eralash or Yeralash (Russian: Ералаш) refers to Russian Whist variants. The Russian word "Eralash" means "jumble" or "scramble".

== Description ==
Like whist and bridge, Eralash is played by foursomes divided into two partnerships facing each other, although it is possible to play variants of the game with only two or three players. It was a popular game in Russia before the Soviet era.

== Rules ==
A full bridge deck of 52 cards is completely dealt out to the players for each hand. The cards in each suit rank from highest to lowest: A K Q J 10 9 8 7 6 5 4 3 2. Like whist, partners are determined by drawing cards, trump is determined by the last card dealt, and verbal strategy and planning (table talk) is not allowed. Partners work together to secure as many tricks as possible. Points are awarded for any tricks taken in a hand in excess of 7 — in other words, a partnership taking 8 tricks is awarded 1 point. The first partnership to gain 13 points wins the robber.

=== Terminology ===
- Leva A trick
- Robber A game consisting of 13 points
- Secant A few cards in the same suit, starting from Ace.
- Singleton A hand containing a single card of any suit.
- Comet When a card is trumped by both opposing players.
- Invit One player plays the lowest card of the strongest suit, inviting their partner to play the highest card.
- Sext major Six cards in order, from ace to nine inclusive.
- Quarte major Four cards in order, from ace to jack inclusive.
- Terz Major Ace, King and Queen.
- Force By leading a suit that your opponent does not have, you force the player to trump.
- To have tenas To have the first and third of the highest cards and be the last in the game in order.

== Yeralash in the 19th Century ==
Christian Vanderheid published a self-teaching manual for Eralash/Yeralash in 1869 in Austria. Yerlash was similar to Biritch and has been proposed as an ancestor of Bridge, but it is more complex having a Misere call and a simple auction. Yeralash is a descendant of Vist-Preferens, a 19th Century fusion of Russian Long Whist and Austrian Préférence

Bridge which became popular in Paris, NY and London in the 1890s is clearly based on Collinson's 1886 Biritch, or Russian Whist, except that NT tricks are worth 12 points instead of 10.

=== Odd Trick and Honour Points Table for Yeralash (1855) ===
- Yeralash (NT) 6 pts
- Misere 6 pts (for every trick opponents take)
- Hearts 5 pts
- Diamonds 4 pts
- Clubs 3 pts
- Spades 2 pts

=== Bidding ===
Bidding and suit order the same as Austrian Préférence

- Starting with Dealer each player may only make one bid.
- Players may pass
- Players can bid a denomination to play
- Players may overcall in a higher denomination

=== Scoring ===
- Scoring was the same as Whist with tricks taken scored below the line and honour tricks scored above the line.
- Game was 20 or 30 points.
- Rubber Bonus is equal to Game
- Slam Bonus 12 tricks, 4 tricks
- Grand Slam 13 tricks, 8 tricks
- Contra and Recontra (also in La Bete) were infinite affecting only trick points and Slam Bonuses.

== Mentions in Russian literature ==
Fyodor Dostoevsky, Demons

His whole figure seemed to exclaim “Cards! Me sit down to jumble with you! Is it consistent? Who is responsible for it? Who has shattered my energies and turned them to jumble? Ah, perish, Russia!” and he would majestically trump with a heart.

Ivan Turgenev, Fathers and Sons

"Indeed? After dinner, then, we will have a jumble, and I will despoil him utterly."
"Ha, ha, ha! We shall see, we shall see."
