= Joseph Bowne Elwell =

American bridge player, teacher, and writer

J. B. Elwell
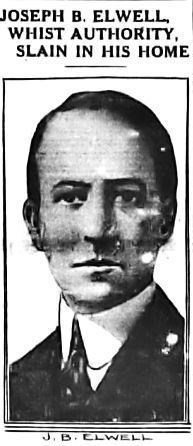
- Newspaper headline announcing Elwell's murder
- Born: Joseph Bowne Elwell; February 24, 1873; Cranford, New Jersey, U.S.
- Died: June 11, 1920 (aged 47); New York City, New York, U.S.
- Occupations: Bridge player, writer and tutor
- Spouse: Helen Derby
- Writing career
- Period: 1902–1920

Joseph Bowne Elwell (February 24, 1873 – June 11, 1920), also known as J. B. Elwell, was an American bridge player, tutor, and writer during the 1900s and 1910s, prior to and during development of the auction bridge version of the card game. He is better known as the victim of an unsolved murder.

== Life ==
Joseph Bowne Elwell, the son of Joseph E. Elwell, was a student at Phillips Academy, Andover, Massachusetts, and worked as an insurance agent as a teenager. Elwell learned the new card game "bridge"—now called bridge whist or straight bridge to distinguish it from later versions—in the course of establishing a young men's club in church, where its play was a popular activity. His fascination with the card game took over his life.

Elwell married Helen Derby, who also liked the game. She was socially well-connected, as her cousin Richard Derby was the husband of Ethel Roosevelt. Elwell's other social connections included his auction bridge partner Harold Stirling Vanderbilt. Such connections provided him with affluent students and with gambling opportunities; he became wealthy enough ultimately to own property in Palm Beach, Florida, twenty horses, five cars, and a yacht. Elwell also took a fancy to some of his female students and acquaintances, and developed a reputation as a womanizer. By 1916 Elwell's wife took their son Richard and filed for separation; by 1920 she was negotiating a divorce.

== Murder ==
In the early morning hours of June 11, 1920, Elwell was murdered with a gunshot to the head from a .45 automatic in his locked house in New York City. The murder has never been solved. A 1921 confession was determined to be the false utterance of a mentally ill man. The crime generated considerable publicity: The New York Times covered it almost daily until the end of July, the Chicago Tribune published eighteen articles, and the Los Angeles Times published twelve. This classic "locked room murder" was the inspiration for S.S. Van Dine's mystery novel The Benson Murder Case (1926), which introduced his famous fictional detective Philo Vance.

According to a review by Kirkus Reviews, Jonathan Goodman's 1987 book The Slaying of Joseph Bowne Elwell fails in its attempted resolution. "Goodman's conclusion can only remain a supposition in a case that is still important largely as the seedbed for the detective novels of both S.S. Van Dine and Ellery Queen, who realized that the popular taste for such urban mysteries could be tapped in fiction."

== See also ==
- List of unsolved murders (1900–1979)

== Works ==
- Bridge: Its Principles and Rules of Play (New York: Charles Scribner's Sons, 1902), 136 pp. – cover and spine title Elwell on Bridge

Reprint 2010, NY: Husband Press, ISBN 9781445550206, OCLC 648693194

- Advanced Bridge: the higher principles of the game analysed and explained (Scribner's 1904), 277 pp. – cover and spine title Elwell's Advanced Bridge

UK ed. 1904, London: George Newnes, 277 pp.
6th ed. 1907, Scribner's, 297 pp.

- The Analysis and Complete Play of the Bridge Tournament Hands (Evening Telegram) (Scribner's, 1904), 69 pp.
- Bridge Lesson (Scribner's, 1906)
- Bridge Axioms and Laws (E. P. Dutton, 1907), 89 pp.
- Practical Bridge: a complete and thorough course of in the game, with over 100 illustrative hands (1908), 249 pp.
- Saalfields's vest pocket Hoyle's Games Modernized, ed. Professor Elwell (Saalfield Pub Co, 1910), 225 pp. – "edited by Professor Elwell. Thoroughly revised with the addition of chapters on auction bridge and other new games, and new chapters on roulette and trente et quarante." OCLC 39345399
- The Principles, Rules, and Laws of Auction Bridge stated, explained and illustrated (Scribner's, 1910), 170 pp. – cover title Elwell on Auction Bridge
- The Principles, Rules and Laws of Auction Bridge stated, explained, and illustrated (Scribner's, 1912), 215 pp. – "new and enlarged edition with the revised laws and the new count" OCLC 69150730

UK edition 1912, Auction Bridge to Date, London: George Newnes, 215 pp.
