= Mr. Beast (disambiguation) =

MrBeast (born 1998) is an American YouTuber.

Mr. Beast or Mr Beast may also refer to:

- Peter John Ramos (born 1985), American basketball player and wrestler with the ring name "Mr. Beast"
- Mr Beast (album), a 2006 album by the Scottish rock band Mogwai

== See also ==
- The Beast (disambiguation)
- Beast (disambiguation)
