= National Institute of Migration =

Unit of the government of Mexico

- Instituto Nacional de Migración
- INM Logo

Agency overview
- Formed: October 19, 1993; 32 years ago
- Jurisdiction: Federal government of Mexico
- Headquarters: Mexico City, Mexico
- Agency executive: Francisco Garduño Yáñez, Director
- Parent agency: Secretariat of the Interior
- Website: www.gob.mx/inm

The National Institute of Migration (Spanish: Instituto Nacional de Migración, INM) is a unit of the government of Mexico dependent on the Secretariat of the Interior that controls and supervises migration in the country.

== Programs ==
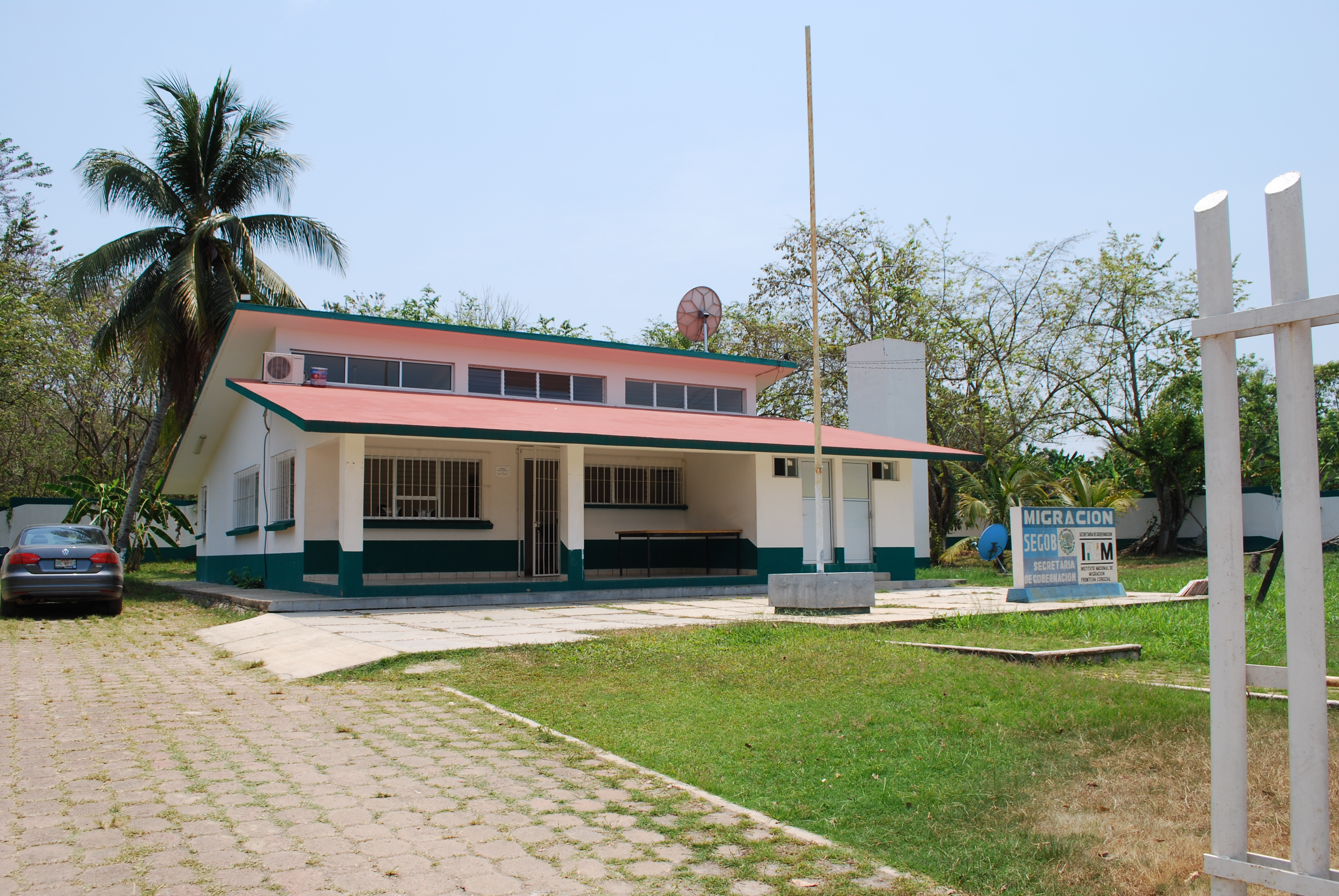
INM office in Frontera Corozal, Chiapas

=== Paisano program ===
During the Presidency of Carlos Salinas de Gortari, the Paisano program was created to assist Mexican nationals returning to Mexico for temporary visits.

=== Grupo Beta ===
Grupos Beta (Beta Groups) is a service by the National Institute of Migration (INM) of Mexico offering water, medical aid, and information to immigrants at risk within the Mexican borders.

=== OPIS ===
Officials of Child Protection 'OFICIALES DE PROTECCIÓN A LA INFANCIA' (OPIS) are Mexican Federal Migration Agents whose main task is to ensure respect for the human rights of children and adolescent migrants, especially children unaccompanied by an adult.

=== 2015 Temporary Migrant Regularization Program ===
The Programa Temporal de Regularización Migratoria (PTRM) published on 12 January 2015 in the Diario Oficial de la Federación, is aimed at those foreigners who have made their permanent residence in Mexico but due to 'diverse circumstances' did not regularize their stay in the country and find themselves turning to 'third parties' to perform various procedures, including finding employment.

The program was aimed at foreign nationals who had entered Mexico before 9 November 2012. Eligible applicants could obtain temporary resident status after approval of their application by an immigration document that is valid for four years. The program ran from 13 January to 18 December 2015.

In accordance with the provisions of Articles: 1, 2, 10, 18, 77, 126 and 133 of the Ley de Migración; 1 and 143 of the Reglamento de la Ley de Migración, any foreign national wishing to regularize their immigration status within Mexican territory, under the PTRM will complete the payment of fees for the following:

1. In 2015, the application review fee was MXN 1,124.00
2. For the issuance of the certificate giving them the status of temporary stay for four years ...... MXN 7914.00

For low-income or vulnerable individuals, Article 16 of the Ley Federal de Derechos will exempt them from payment if it can be proven that the foreign national earns a wage at or below minimum wage. During the period that the PTRM is in effect, no fine will be applied (as is the practice otherwise).

== Offices ==
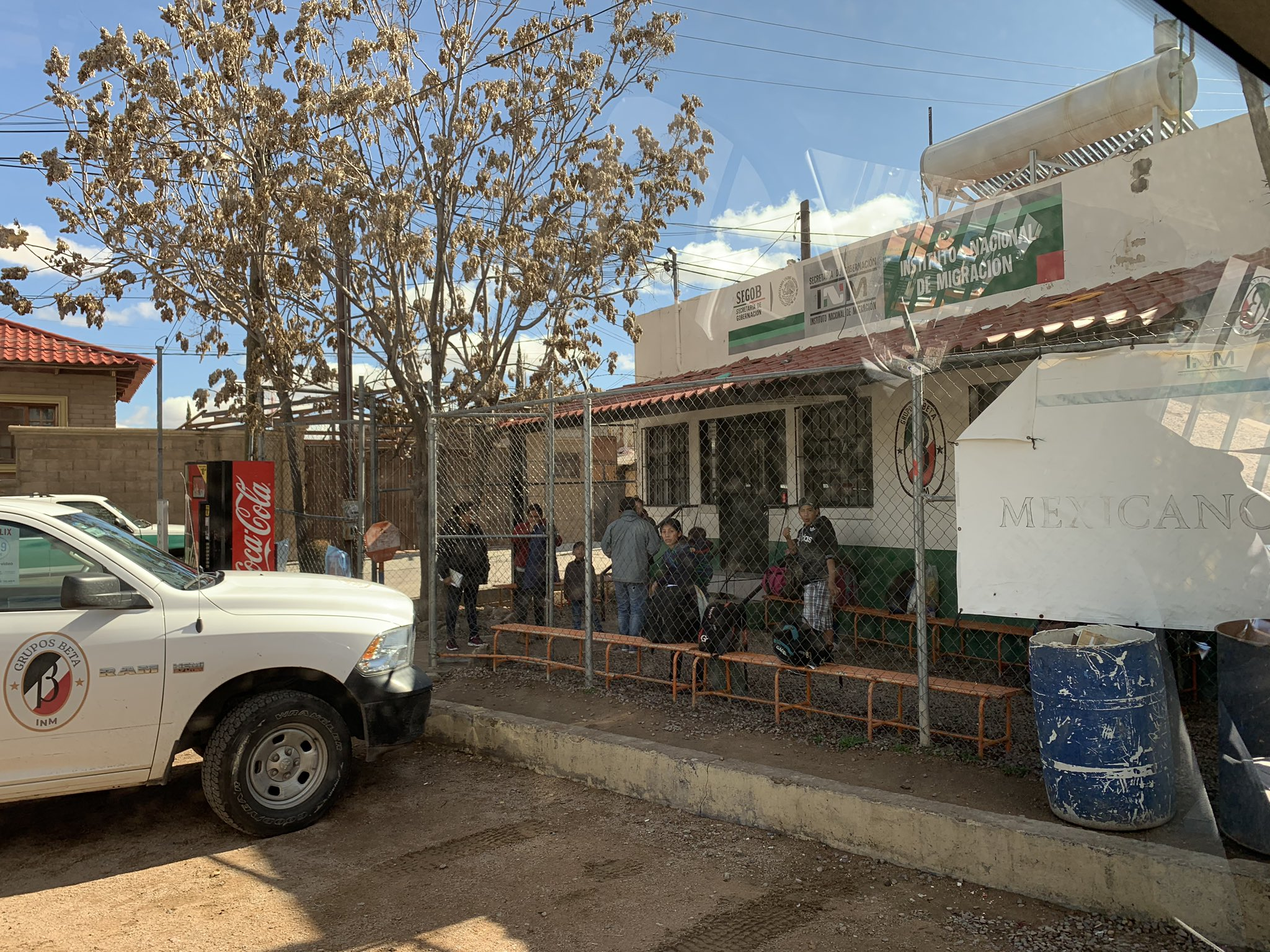
An INM office in Northern Mexico, just south of El Paso, Texas.

Since 1999, the INM approved the increase from 16 to 32 regional offices, one for every state of Mexico and the Federal District. It also has 45 migration stations concentrated on border states (land), Mexico City (air) and the Gulf of Mexico (sea). These stations are:

State	City	State	City
Aguascalientes	Aguascalientes	Guerrero	Acapulco
Baja California	Mexicali	Guerrero	Zihuatanejo
Baja California	Tijuana	Michoacán	Morelia
Baja California Sur	Los Cabos	Oaxaca	La Ventosa
Campeche	Campeche	Oaxaca	Oaxaca
Campeche	Ciudad del Carmen	Oaxaca	Salina Cruz
Campeche	Escárcega	Oaxaca	San Pedro Tapanatepec
Chiapas	Ciudad Cuauhtémoc	Quintana Roo	Cancún
Chiapas	Ciudad Hidalgo	Quintana Roo	Chetumal
Chiapas	Comitán	San Luis Potosí	San Luis Potosí
Chiapas	Echegaray	Sinaloa	Mazatlán
Chiapas	El Hueyate	Sonora	Agua Prieta
Chiapas	El Manguito	Tabasco	La Venta
Chiapas	Frontera Corozal	Tabasco	Temosique
Chiapas	Huehuetán	Tabasco	Villahermosa
Chiapas	Mazapa de Madero	Tamaulipas	Matamoros
Chiapas	Palenque	Tamaulipas	Miguel Alemán
Chiapas	Playa de Catazaja	Tamaulipas	Nuevo Laredo
Chiapas	San Cristobal de las Casas	Tamaulipas	Reynosa
Chiapas	San Gregorio Chamic	Tamaulipas	Tampico
Chiapas	Talismán	Veracruz	Acayucán
Chiapas	Tapachula	Veracruz	El Fortín
Chiapas	Tuxtla Gutiérrez	Veracruz	Veracruz
Chihuahua	Chihuahua	Yucatán	Mérida
Distrito Federal	AICM	Zacatecas	Zacatecas
Distrito Federal	Iztapalapa	Zacatecas	

== Immigration statistics ==
=== 2004 ===
- People who traveled to other countries through Mexico: 114,000
- Number of undocumented immigrants:

By outcome
- Deported out of Mexico: 211,218
- Detained in Mexico: 215,695
By country of origin:
- Guatemala: 42.9%
- Honduras: 33.7%
- El Salvador: 17.9%
- Nicaragua: 1.3%
- Other: 4.2%

- Foreign visitors registered and documented: 23,048,000
- Foreign people, permanently residing in Mexico, re-entering the country: 1,582
- Temporary workers from Guatemala re-entering the country: 41,894
- Foreign people entering the country temporarily: 19,614,710

By reason of entry
Tourists: 8,770,686
Business travelers: 413,619
Other: 10,430,405

- People who entered to apply for residency: 8,513
- People who received Mexican citizenship: 1,582
- People who regularized their immigration status: 4,373

By country:
- Guatemala: 1,332
- Honduras: 1,046
- El Salvador: 492
- Colombia: 307
- Nicaragua: 161
- Peru: 155
- Other countries: 650
By state of residence:
- Chiapas: 1,571
- Federal District: 517
- Baja California: 305
- Jalisco: 266
- Quintana Roo: 222
- Tamaulipas: 275
- Campeche: 160
- Chihuahua: 119
- Veracruz: 108
By gender:
- Women: 2,214
- Men: 2,159

== 2017 report ==
A 2017 report commissioned by the Instituto Nacional de Migración argued that migrants from Guatemala, Honduras and El Salvador were subjected to physical, verbal and sexual abuse in its detention centers, including solitary confinement, death threats and unwanted sexual contact. The INM disputed the claims.

== 2023 Ciudad Juárez migrant center fire ==
The institute was responsible for the Ciudad Juárez migrant center fire where 40 immigrants died.
