= The Animal (nickname) =

The Animal or Animal is the nickname of:

== The Animal ==
- Joseph Barboza (1932–1976), Portuguese-American mafioso and mob hitman
- Dave Bautista (born 1969), American actor, mixed martial artist, and professional wrestler
- George Steele (1937–2017), American professional wrestler
- Ellen van Dijk (born 1987), Dutch cyclist
- Brad Lesley (1958–2013), American baseball player and television personality
- Mark Mendoza (born 1955), American bass player
- Jerry Walter McFadden (1948–1999), American serial killer
- Anthony Parnes, English stockbroker convicted of trading fraud committed in the 1980s
- Michael Smith (basketball, born 1972), American National Basketball Association player

== Animal ==
- Clive Burgess (1950–2006), Welsh rugby union player
- Chris Carter (outfielder) (born 1982), American baseball player
- Edmundo (footballer) (born 1971), Brazilian footballer

== See also ==
- Alex González (musician) (born 1969), American drummer and songwriter for the Mexican band Maná nicknamed "El Animal"
- Pasquale Barra, former hitman for the Italian Camorra criminal organization nicknamed "'o Nimale" ("The Animal")
- Jorge Costa (born 1971), Portuguese retired footballer nicknamed "Bicho" ("Animal")
- The Beast (nickname), a set index of people nicknamed "The Beast"
