= The Beast (book) =

2010 book by Óscar Martínez

The Beast: Riding the Rails and Dodging Narcos on the Migrant Trail
- Author: Óscar Martínez
- Original title: Los migrantes que no importan
- Translators: Daniela Maria Ugaz; John B. Washington
- Language: English
- Subject: El tren de la muerte
- Publisher: Verso Books
- Media type: Print
- Pages: 267
- ISBN: 9781781682975

The Beast: Riding the Rails and Dodging Narcos on the Migrant Trail is the first book by Salvadoran journalist Óscar Martínez. The book was originally published in Spanish in 2010 as Los migrantes que no importan (The Migrants that Don't Matter). It was translated into English in 2013 by Daniela Maria Ugaz and John B. Washington. The book follows the harsh journey of Central American immigrants on the El tren de la muerte to the United States.

== Background ==
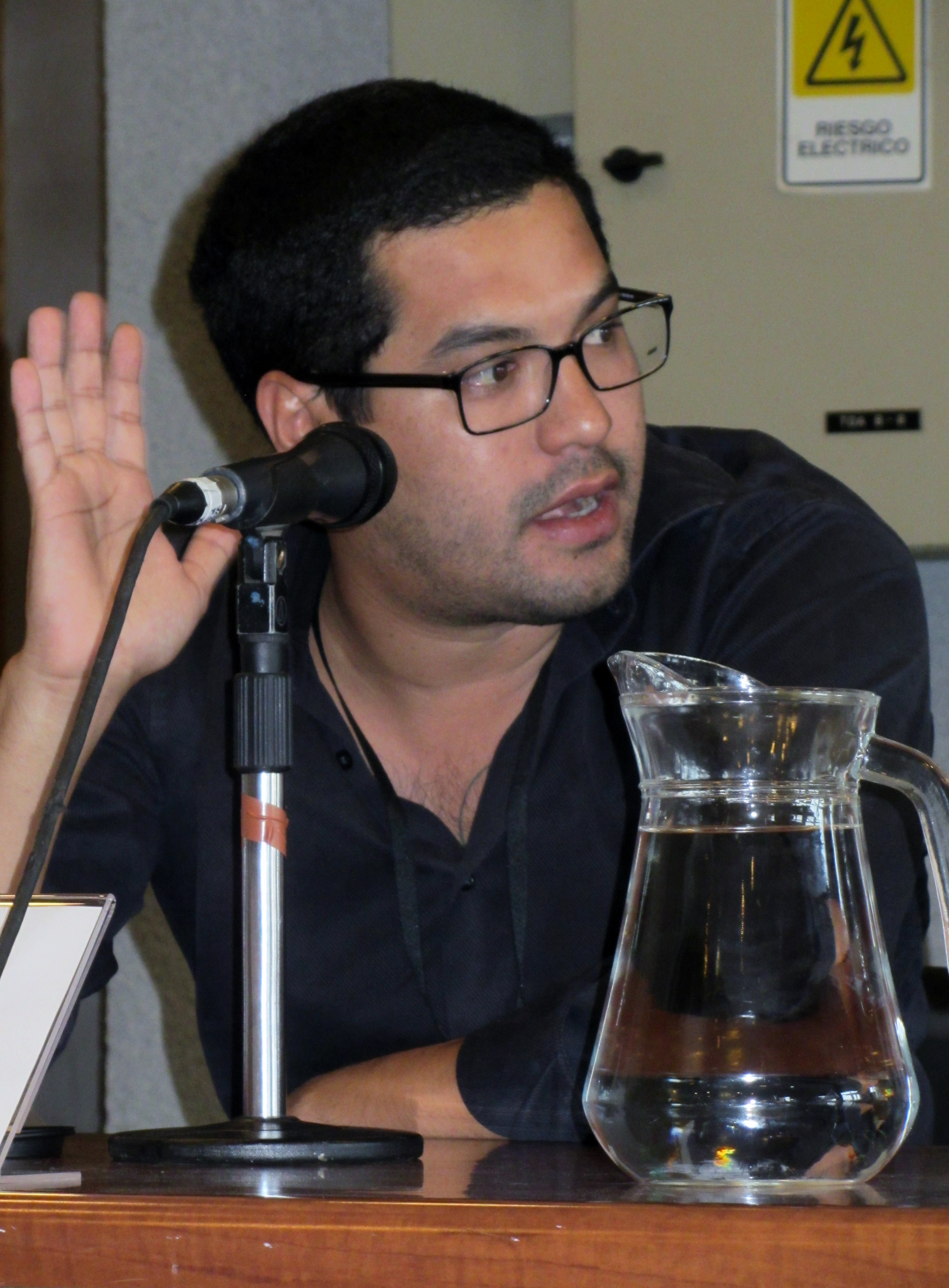
The author Óscar Martínez

Martinez works as a journalist for El Faro. He spent a year travelling with the migrants across Mexico along with a crew of photographers and filmmakers and made eight trips aboard the freight trains on the El tren de la muerte. The book is a compilation of a series of stories published in the newspaper. The book was first published in 2010 by Icaria and El Faro and a second edition was released by Mexican publishers sur+ Ediciones in 2012. The English translation was published by Verso Books and has an introduction by Francisco Goldman.

== Reception ==
The book was met with largely positive reviews. The Guardian called it a 'gale-force book' and appreciated the 'raw authenticity' of the prose. The New York Times felt that the title change from the Spanish version was to 'subtly shift the emphasis to the train and away from its reluctant passengers' and felt that the translation takes away some of the 'sizzle of the original'. They however lauded the 'graceful, incisive writing' and called it an honorable successor to The Road to Wigan Pier by George Orwell and How the Other Half Lives by Jacob Riis. The Economist drew parallels with Joan Didion's book Salvador while also appreciating the translation work. Financial Times lauded the 'precise, empathetic and often poetic language' of the writer which 'summons rage and pity but also admiration in the reader'.

Martinez won the WOLA-Duke book award for The Beast in 2014. He also won the CPJ International Press Freedom Awards in 2016.
