= Bestie =

Bestie may refer to:

== Music ==
- Bestie (group), a South Korean band
- "Bestie" (DaBaby and YoungBoy Never Broke Again song), 2022
- "Bestie" (Yungen song), 2017
- "Bestie", a 2019 song by Bhad Bhabie
- "Bestie", a 2024 song by Band-Maid from Epic Narratives
- "Bestie", a song by Jay Park from his 2011 album Take a Deeper Look

== Film ==
- Bestie (film), a 2022 Indian film
- Besty (film), a 2025 Indian film

== Other uses ==
- George Best, Irish football player

== See also ==
- Best Friend (disambiguation)
