= Shelter of Jesus the Good Shepherd for the Poor and Migrant =

Coordinates: 14.8741°N 92.3089°W

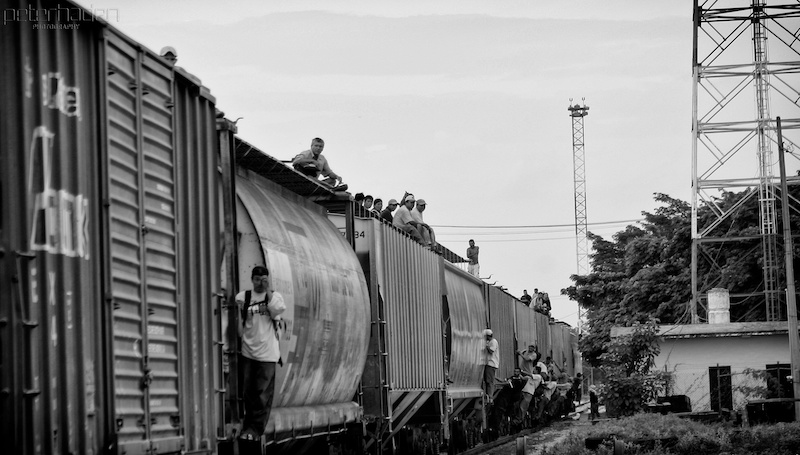
Migrants riding "The Beast"

The Shelter of Jesus the Good Shepherd for the Poor and Migrant (Albergue Jesús el Buen Pastor del Pobre y el Migrante) is a refugee shelter in Tapachula, Chiapas, Mexico, for Latin American migrants.

== About ==
The migrants are injured and disabled by freight trains, frequently suffering amputation, in their attempted migration out of Latin America to the United States. The trains take the Chiapas-Mayab line, running north–south through Mexico and are called "The Death Express" or La Bestia "The Beast" by migrants. Some of the injured migrants have suffered violence at the hands of gangs who attack those who do not pay to ride The Beast, and commit other acts of violence against migrants. The shelter has been funded by private donations, and by the United States Department of State Bureau of Population, Refugees and Migration, and Australia's Department of Foreign Affairs and Trade.

It is one of several migrant shelters in Mexico including Acayucan Migrant Shelter, Ixtepec's Brothers Along the Way Migrant Shelter, Guadalupan Diocesan Shelter of Tierra Blanca, Reynosa's Our Lady of Guadalupe Shelter, Reynosa's Christian Way of Life Shelter, Saltillo Migrant Center, and The 72 – Shelter for Migrants.

The shelter was founded in the late 1990s by Olga Sanchez Martinez, recipient of the National Human Rights Commission of Mexico's National Human Rights Prize in 2004. She remains its director as of 2015.
