= Grupos Beta =

Service by the National Institute of Migration (INM) of Mexico

Grupos Beta (Beta Groups) is a service by the National Institute of Migration (INM) of Mexico offering water, medical aid, and information to immigrants at risk. The first Grupos Beta was started in Beta Tijuana in 1990. Grupo Beta's primary role is to protect the Human Rights of migrants regardless of their immigration status as stated in their motto, “vocation, humanitarianism and loyalty.” Members of Grupos Beta are generally selected from local, state, and federal law enforcement agencies. They are then given extensive training that primarily emphasizes providing first aid, social services, access to shelters, search and rescue, and have specialized training in water and air rescue services. After their promotions and intense training, members of Grupos Beta earn a pay increase, a life insurance policy, and they get 15 vacation days every six months. Grupos Beta provide transportation aid to get migrants back home and stress they do not provide transportation aid to migrants to get into the United States. Grupo Beta's blue flags alert migrants to water stations in the desert and advise migrants that the area is patrolled by Grupos Beta. There are now 21 Grupos Beta operated on three agency levels within the Mexican government in the states of Baja California, Sonora, Chihuahua, Coahuila, Tamaulipas, Veracruz, Tabasco, Chiapas and Oaxaca.

== Authorization By Mexican Law ==
“The legal basis for the creation of the Beta Groups Migrant Protection, is established in Article 71 of the Migration Act, published in the Official Journal of the Federation on May 25, 2011. Article 71. The Secretariat will protect migrant groups who are in the country, which will support the protection and defense of their rights, regardless of nationality or immigration status. The Secretary shall enter into agreements of collaboration and consultation with the departments and agencies of the Federal Government, the states and municipalities, with civil society organizations or individuals, with the aim of participating in the installation and operation of the migrant protection groups. “

== Human Rights Abuse Allegations ==
Amnesty International and other human rights groups are concerned about the violence migrants face while en route to the United States. Tens of thousands of migrants from Central America face human rights abuses at the hands of gangs, kidnappers, robbers, sexual predators and face other forms of abuses while in transit within the Mexican borders. Amnesty International cites the insufficient funding of services such as the Grupos Beta as not meeting the needs of the migrants within the Mexican government's jurisdiction and which is their responsibility. Grupos Beta workers have also been accused of extorting migrants, and for reporting migrants to immigration officials for detainment and deportation.

== Migrant Knowledge of Program ==
Despite the criticism, the program is popular with the migrants that travel the commercial trains, as noted in the movie Which Way Home, and in particular with unaccompanied minors and youth. The officers are a welcomed sight to the migrant travelers in dire need of services. GRUPOS BETA also arrange for shelters for those in need of long term assistance, or who can no longer continue on their journey.

== OPIS ==
Officials of Child Protection 'OFICIALES DE PROTECCIÓN A LA INFANCIA' (OPIS) are Mexican Federal Migration Agents whose main task is to ensure respect for the human rights of children and adolescent migrants, especially children unaccompanied by an adult.

Currently, the National Institute Migration (INM) has 543 OPIS in the 32 regional offices. The OPIS are selected according to a profile developed by the National System for Integral Family Development (SNDIF) and receive ongoing, specialized training.

== List of GRUPOS BETA ==
The recent mass migration of unaccompanied children from Central America was reported as early as 2009 and increased in 2014 which has led to many children being at risk to be lost, injured or at risk of being trafficked by criminals, sex traffickers, gangs, corrupt officials and drug cartels. Mexico has provided a list of GRUPOS BETA where the missing can be reported, lists checked for process of reunification with relatives, Embassy services for unaccompanied children in care, shelter placements and the process of returning remains to next of kin for burial. GRUPOS BETA report that they are seeing more transitory migrants that are children, women and older men who are potentially at risk as they make their journey north.

GRUPO BETA TIJUANA Puerto fronterizo s/n, Puerto México, Col. Empleados federales C.P. 22010, Tijuana, B. C. Tel. (664) 682 9454 / 3171 683 3068 Módulo El Chaparral (664) 682 3171

GRUPO BETA TECATE Calle 18 esq. con Tanama s/n, Col. Bella vista, C.P. 21440 Tecate, B. C. Tel. (665) 654 2449, 654 3780

GRUPO BETA MEXICALI Av. Melgar No. 1, Garita Internacional, Zona Centro, C. P. 21100, Mexicali, B. C. Tel. 01 (686) 554 2624, 552 5596

GRUPO BETA SAN LUIS DE RÍO COLORADO Av. Ignacio Zaragoza No. 2708 entre 27 y 28, Col. Burócratas C. P. 83450, San Luis Río Colorado, Sonora Tel. (653) 534 5062 / 534 4870

GRUPO BETA NOGALES Cale Reforma 465, Col. El Rosario, C. P. 84020, Nogales, Sonora Tel. (631) 312 6180 y 81

GRUPO BETA SONOYTA Puerta Int. Boulevard Benemérito de las Américas No. 285 Línea Internacional, Col. Hombres Blancos C. P. 83570, Sonoyta, Sonora Tel. (651) 512 1520, 01/512 1051

GRUPO BETA AGUA PRIETA Calle Dos, Avenida 6 y 7 No. 697 Col. Centro C. P. 84200 Agua Prieta, Sonora Tel. (633) 338 1618, 338 8962

GRUPO BETA PIEDRAS NEGRAS Oficinas federales, Pte. Internacional Coahuila 2000 Planta Alta, C. P. 26000, Piedras negras, Coahuila Tel. (878) 782 8832, 782 8846

GRUPO BETA CIUDAD ACUÑA Puente Int. Calle Hidalgo No. 1, Col. Zona Centro, C. P. 26200, Cd. Acuña, Coahuila Tel. (877) 772 7524 /1239

GRUPO BETA MATAMOROS Av. Álvaro Obregón s/n, Puete Internacional Puerta México, Col. Jardín 1er piso C. P. 87330, Matamoros, Tamaulipas Tel. (868) 812 3664, 812 3468

GRUPO BETA TAPACHULA Calle Vialidad No. 435 Fraccionamiento Las Vegas C. P. 30798 Tapachula, Chiapas Tel. (962) 625 7986, 626 7332

GRUPO BETA COMITÁN Calle Central Benito Juárez Poniente No. 130 esquina con Novena Poniente, Col. Barrio Candelaria C. P. 30060 Comitán, Chiapas Tel. (963) 632 5751, 632 7709

GRUPO BETA CIUDAD JUÁREZ General Rivas Guillén 950, Col. Centro C. P. 32000, Cd. Juárez, Chihuahua Tel. (656) 612 7618 /612 7619

GRUPO BETA PUERTO PALOMAS Av. 5 de mayo e Internacional s/n, Col. Centro C. P. 31830, Puerto Palomas de Villas, Chihuahua Tel. (656) 666 0889

GRUPO BETA ACAYUCAN Carretera costera del golfo no. 180 km. 221 C. P. 96000 Acayucan, Veracruz Tel. (924) 247 9174, 247 9173

GRUPO BETA SÁSABE Calle 1era. s/n entre Av. A y calle Hidalgo, Col. Solidaridad C.P. 83870, Sásabe, Sonora Tel. (637) 374 8076

GRUPO BETA TENOSIQUE Calle 25 No. 638 entre las 46 y 50 Col. Cocoyotl, C. P. 86902, Tenosique, Tabasco Tel. (934) 342 0110

GRUPO BETA PALENQUE Carretera federal Playas de Catazcaja - Ocosingo Km. 26+100 Lado A, Col. Guayacán C. P. 29960, Palenque, Chiapas Tel. (916) 345 3035 Ext. 209, 210

GRUPO BETA ARRIAGA 5ta. Poniente No. 722 entre 14 y 16 Sur, Barrio de Santo Tomás C. P. 30450, Arriaga, Chiapas Tel. (962) 625 7986, 626 7332

GRUPO BETA TUXTLA GUTIÉRREZ 5ta. Avenida Norte y 13 Poniente No. 1402, Col. El Magueyito, C. P. 29000, Tuxtla Gutiérrez, Chiapas Tel. (961) 602 6111, 602 6119

GRUPO BETA IXTEPEC Carretera Ixtepec - Juchitán Km. 1.5 s/n C. P. 70110 Cd. Ixtepec, Oaxaca Tel. (971) 713 3047
