= Berrisford Boothe =

American visual artist

- Born: 1961 (age 64–65); Kingston, Jamaica
- Occupations: Visual artist, academic, writer, curator

Berrisford Boothe (born 1961 in Kingston, Jamaica) is a multimedia American visual artist, academic, writer, and curator.

== Biography ==
Boothe received his BA in art from Lafayette College in 1983. In 1994 he was bestowed with the college's first "Alumnus Award for Distinguished Achievement in the Visual Arts".

Boothe is an associate professor of art at Lehigh University.

For many years Boothe was represented by the June Kelly gallery in New York City and had solo wxhibitions there in 1993 and 1996. From June 9 until July 31, 2012 his work was the subject of absolo exhibition titled That Which is Necessary and Available at the Williams Center at gis alma mater, Lafayette College in Easton, Pennsylvania.

in 2019 he penned one of the catslogue essayss for the exhibition "Afrocosmologies; American Reflections" at the United State's oldest art museum, the Wadsworth Atheneum in Hartford, Connecticut, where he also gsve a tàlk.

In 2023 he was a visiting artist at the storied Pennsylvania Academy of the Fine Arts in Philadelphia.

Boothe is the principal curator of the Petrucci family foundation collection.

== Paintings ==
Boothe creates polychrome paintings in the round.

The Pennsylvania Convention Center, which holds his work in their permanent collection says of it on theue art page [that] ..."In the absence of recognizable representational form, Boothe must depend on another formula for call and response. In abstraction that agent is the pure alchemical relationship belines (real or implied) and rhythm."...
