= Fourth and Blanchard Building =

Coordinates: 47°36′52″N 122°20′33″W

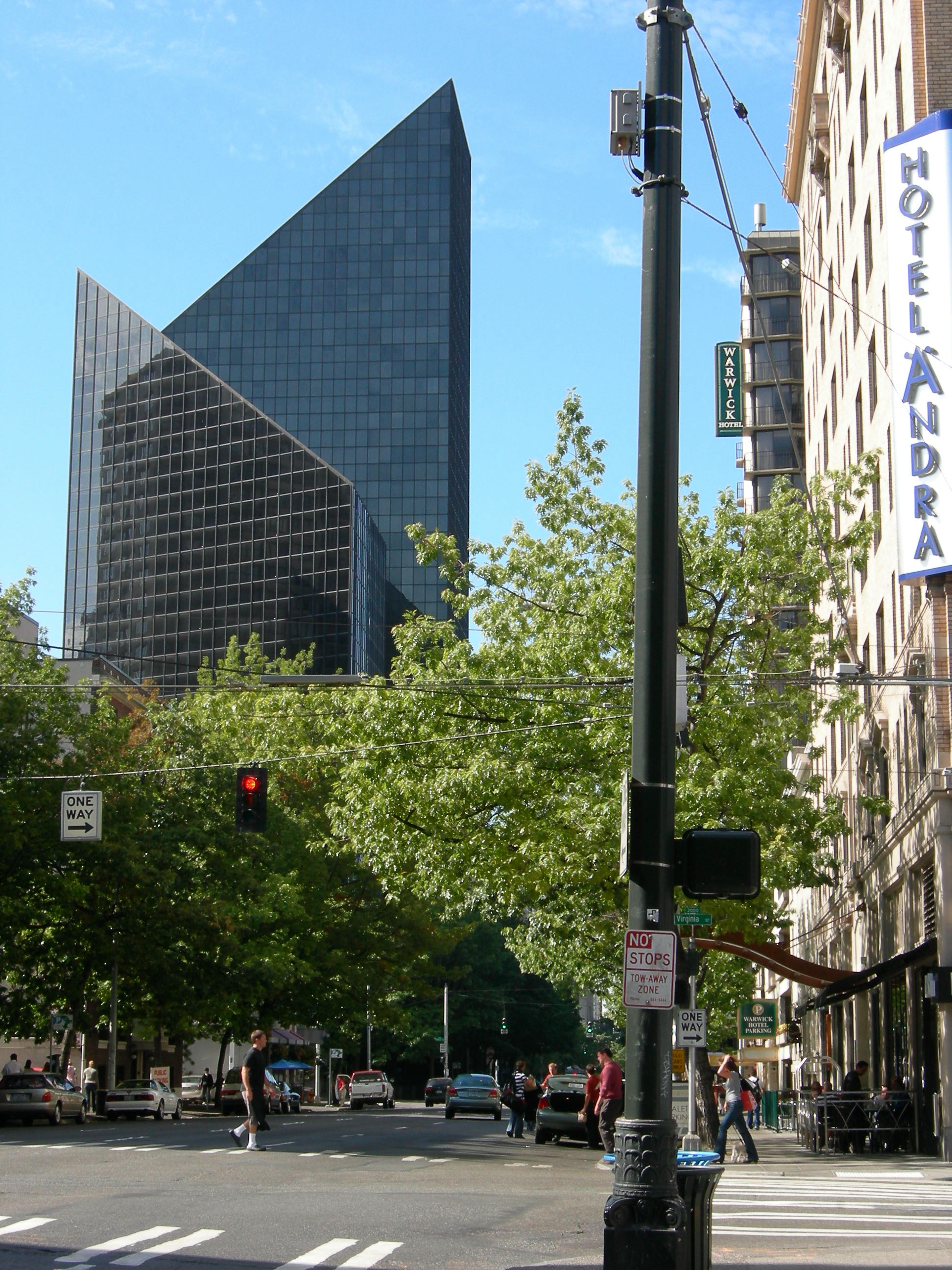
- The Fourth and Blanchard Building as seen from the South at Virginia Street

- Location within Downtown Seattle

General information
- Type: office, government
- Location: 2101 Fourth Avenue, Seattle, United States
- Completed: 1979

Height
- Roof: 105 m (344 ft)

Technical details
- Floor count: 25 (Above) 3 (Below)

Design and construction
- Architect: Chester L. Lindsey Architects

The Fourth and Blanchard Building, also known as the Sedgwick James Building or the Darth Vader building, is a skyscraper located in the Belltown neighborhood just north of downtown Seattle. The high-rise style construction rises to 105 meters (344 feet) and has 25 floors above the ground. Chester L. Lindsey Architects, notable as the architects of the Columbia Center, designed the building. The building holds commercial office space. It is located in the Denny Regrade, on the site of what was once the highest point of Denny Hill, and is about one hundred feet taller than the peak of the former hill.

The building was completed in 1979 and is clad in reflective glass. Its design is reminiscent of Houston's Pennzoil Place. The Red Popsicle is installed outside the building.

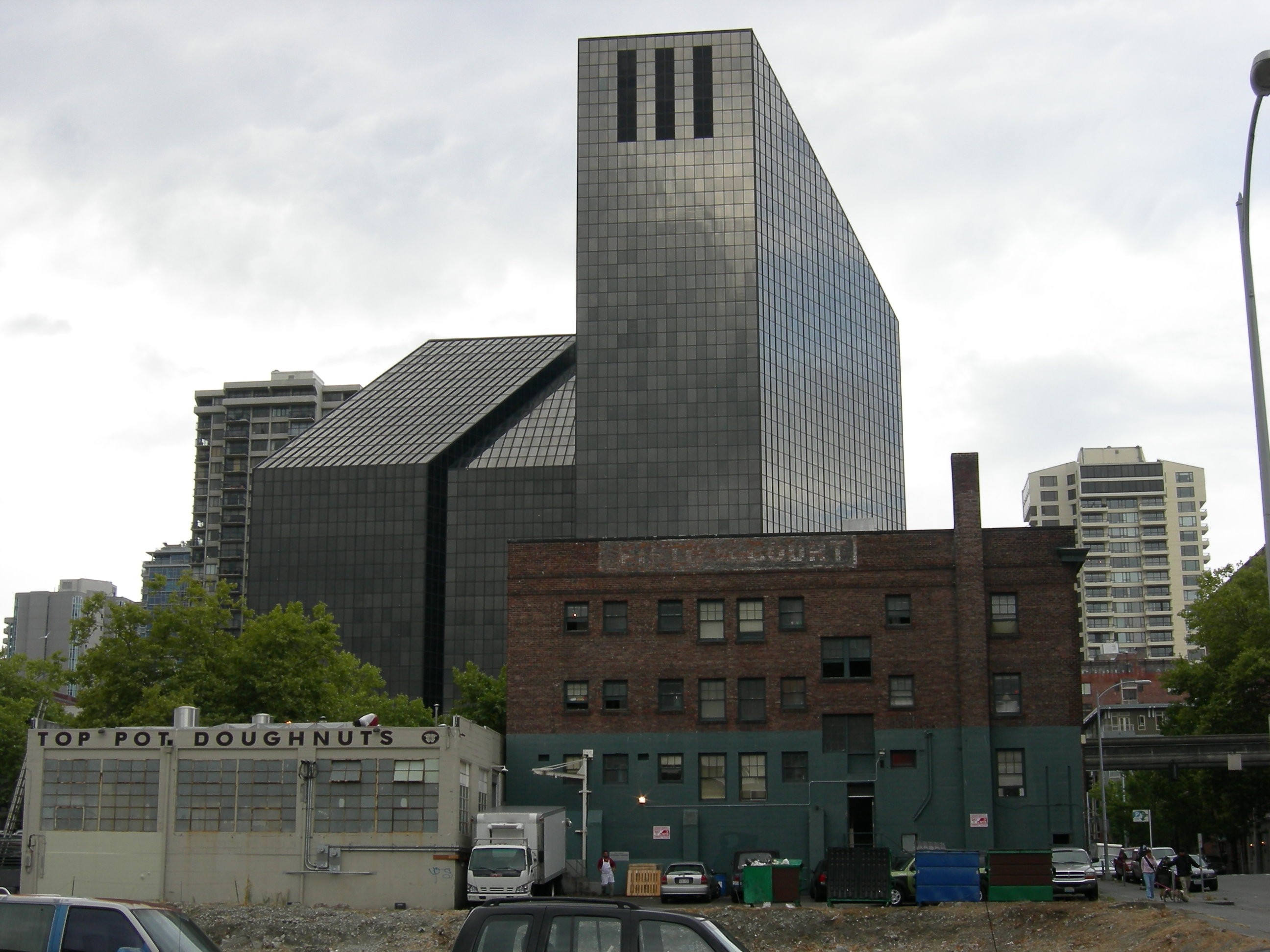
View from the east of the Fourth and Blanchard Building, Seattle, Washington.
