= Beasts (novella) =

2001 novella by Joyce Carol Oates

- First edition
- Author: Joyce Carol Oates
- Cover artist: Henry Fuseli, The Nightmare, 1781
- Language: English
- Publisher: Carroll & Graf Publishers
- Publication date: 29 Nov 2001
- Publication place: United States
- Media type: Print (hardback & paperback)
- Pages: 80
- ISBN: 0-7867-0896-4
- OCLC: 48513006

Beasts is a novella by Joyce Carol Oates and was originally published in 2001. The book is primarily set in the 1970s, concerns a predatory couple that take advantage of Gillian Brauer, a student at a liberal arts college.

== Plot summary ==
As she walks along the Seine in 21st century Paris, Gillian Brauer reflects on her experiences as a student an all-women's college in the 1970s. As a young adult, Gillian was obsessed with her charismatic anti-establishment English professor Andre Harrow. Knowing that other girls preceded her does not deter Gillian from being drawn towards the decadent Professor Harrow and his French wife, Dorcas, the bisexual sculptor of primal totems.

Gillian begins living with the couple, who regularly drug her without her consent, often spiking her drinks with quaaludes. Professor Harrow and his wife promise Gillian that they will take her to Paris with them, but instead instruct her to remain at their home and act as a housekeeper in their absence. While they are gone, Gillian discovers that Andre and Dorcas have sexually explicit photographs of other young people that they have drugged and used in order to fulfill their own sexual desires. Towards the end of the novella, an intoxicated Gillian burns Andre and Dorcas alive, but she is never tried for the incident. It is revealed that Gillian currently has a teaching job.

== Reception ==
Writing for The Guardian, Ali Smith praised the novella but indicated that it was of lesser quality than Oates's major works.

== Bibliography ==
- Oates, Joyce Carol. Beasts. Carroll and Graf Publishers, 2002.
