= Beast (street artist) =

Italian artist

- Born: Milan, Italy
- Known for: Artist

Beast is an Italian anonymous contemporary street artist from Milan.

== Early life ==
Beast is the pseudonym for an anonymous Milan-based street artist who has been active on the streets of Europe and United States since 2009, with a focus on stencils at first and later at creating digital collages aiming to highlight political and social issues.

== Career ==
Beast created public artworks that portray well-known political figures including Donald Trump, Angela Merkel, Marine Le Pen, Matteo Renzi, Silvio Berlusconi, Matteo Salvini and Mario Draghi.

Beast uses photo manipulation technique to create his works, as well as wheat pasting and billboard hijacking methods to place his works in the public sphere.

== Artistic evolution ==
In the early 2020s, Beast’s practice evolved from politically focused collage and billboard interventions toward a research-based approach centered on memory, history, and cultural figures.

== Art exhibitions ==
Year	Exhibition	City
2026	Elements Contemporary Art Space	London
2019	Affordable Art Fair	Milan
2018	Stroke Art Fair	Munich
2017	Public Art Festival	Athens
2017	Oxford International Art Fair	Oxford
2016	H Views Politics in Art	Zürich
2016	Grenoble Street Art Festival	Grenoble
2016	Dream Factory	Milan

== Bibliography ==
- Catz, Jérôme (2015). Street Art le Guide (in French). Flammarion. ISBN 978-2081358805.
- Ganz, Nicholas (2015). Street Messages. Dokument Press. ISBN 978-9185639731.
