= Beast Lake =

Lake in the state of Minnesota, United States

- Location within Minnesota
- Location: St. Louis County, Minnesota
- Coordinates: 48°30′31″N 92°45′46″W
- Type: Lake
- Surface area: 85.04 acres (34.41 ha)
- Surface elevation: 1,204 feet (367 m)

Beast Lake is a natural lake in St. Louis County, Minnesota, in the United States. A variant name is Wilson Lake. This lake has a surface area of 85.04 acres (34.41 ha). Beast Lake is located in Voyageurs National Park. The 2.5-mile (4.0 km) Beast Lake Trail is ranked "moderate" difficulty by the National Park Service. Fishing at Beast Lake is prohibited.

== See also ==
- List of lakes in Minnesota
