= Surfing Madonna =

Mosaic in Encinitas, California

Coordinates: 33°2′56.2″N 117°17′36.5″W

External image
- Mosaic

Surfing Madonna

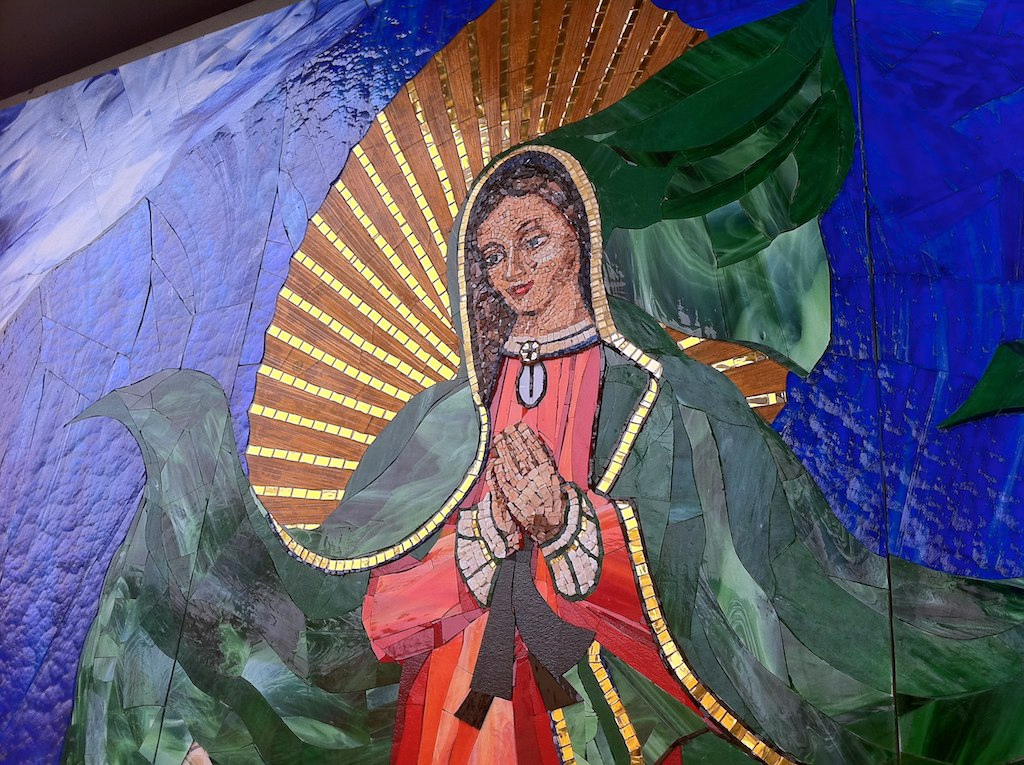
Surfing Madonna, detail showing mosaic

The Surfing Madonna is a 10 by 10 feet (3.0 m × 3.0 m) mosaic of the Virgen de Guadalupe created by artist Mark Patterson. It was covertly installed in Encinitas, California by Patterson and his friend Bob Nichols, who posed as construction workers during the installation. The city declared that the artwork was to be considered graffiti because of the illegality of its installation. Patterson came forward to accept responsibility for it, and was fined $500 and ordered to pay approximately $6,000 for the art's removal. It was removed in 90 minutes, and Patterson was allowed to keep the art.

The response to the installation was divided: while some members of the Catholic and Latino communities took issue with it, others felt that it symbolized their Mexican heritage. The art is now in place across the street from where it was originally installed. It inspired a 501c3 non profit founded by Mark Patterson and Bob Nichols called "Surfing Madonna Oceans Project". Since the inception of the non-profit in 2013 the Surfing Madonna Oceans Project has donated nearly $600,000 to local ocean/beach/park and humanitarian programs.

== Installation and legality ==
The piece was installed on a 10 foot-square concrete wall on a rail bridge in the city of Encinitas. Dressed as construction workers, Mark Patterson and longtime friend Bob Nichols installed the mosaic clandestinely in about two hours on the afternoon of April 22, 2011. It was covertly installed in Encinitas, California (on Earth Day/Good Friday).

The mosaic features the Virgin of Guadalupe on a white surfboard, hands in an attitude of prayer, with her green cloak waving in the wind. The words "Save the Ocean" are displayed vertically to her left.

As the piece was installed without prior permission, it was considered to be graffiti. $2,000 was spent by officials for an art consultant to review how best to remove it without destroying it. During that process, they discovered — underneath the glass — part of Mark Patterson's name. He soon came forward and admitted to being the mosaic's creator.

Patterson was fined $500 by the city, and at the city's demand, paid approximately $6,000 to a local contractor to remove the mosaic from the train bridge wall. The mosaic came down in about 90 minutes, with minimal damage. The city allowed Patterson to reclaim the mosaic.

== Response ==
While some members of the Catholic and Latino communities found it offensive, others identify with it as symbol of their Mexican heritage. The local Catholic priest was fond of the artwork, and even asked that a local church be able to display it.

The state believed that the mosaic could violate the separation in the constitution between state and church. As a result, the state denied the request to put the Surfing Madonna at the entrance of Moonlight Beach State Park.

== Reinstallation ==
For a period of time the mosaic was on display on an exterior wall at Cafe Ipe, next door to Surfy Surfy, in the neighborhood of Leucadia, north of its original location.

The mosaic is now out of storage and back in public view. It has been reinstalled in Encinitas directly across the street from its original location now called Surfing Madonna Park at Leucadia Pizzeria, on the corner of Highway 101 and Encinitas Boulevard.

The Surfing Madonna Oceans Project raised $100,000 for the Encinitas community in 2014 with its 2nd Annual Surfing Madonna "Save the Ocean" 5K/10K and 10 Mile Beach Run/Walk. In 2014 it set up a brick paver project to raise money for ocean and humanitarian programs, www.surfingmadonna.org, and will have its 3rd annual run/walk in hopes of raising $150,000 for the community in October, 2015.

The Surfing Madonna Foundation recently donated $60,000 to local causes. The nonprofit organization donated $20,000 to the City of Solana Beach toward its upcoming skatepark and $40,000 to the Encinitas Arts Culture and Ecology Alliance (EACEA) otherwise known as Pacific View, a former elementary school now turning into an arts and ecology center. They've donated $70,000 to this artful and ambitious nonprofit's Pacific View project since January 2017. Encinitas Advocate

Since 2013, the Project has donated thousands of dollars to ocean conservation initiatives and humanitarian projects including the Surf Camp for Special Needs Children, oceanography scholarships, marine mammal rescue equipment and student grants for ocean-minded projects. The Project has also donated floating beach wheelchairs and mobility mats for physically disabled people to access the water at Moonlight Beach in Encinitas.
