= Beasties (film) =

1989 American film

- Directed by: Steven Paul Contreras
- Written by: Steven Paul Contreras
- Produced by: Steven Paul Contreras
- Starring: Eric C. Bushman; Denise Mora; Hector Yanez
- Cinematography: Steven Paul Contreras
- Edited by: Antonio Lopez, Jr.
- Music by: Darrell Devaurs
- Distributed by: Cinema Home Video
- Release date: May 2, 1989
- Running time: 83 minutes
- Country: United States
- Language: English

Beasties (originally entitled Bionaut) is a 1989 American horror film, written, produced and directed by Steven Paul Contreras.

== Title allusions ==
The term "Beasties" is never used in the film, and is clearly designed to invoke Gremlins (which the box cites along with Back to the Future as influences), although the creatures are not the main focus of the film.

== Plot ==
The film depicts an alien invasion, with extraterrestrial crafts landing on an area with many amorous teens. The plot deals with "Bionaut" (living) vessels, which have traveled back in time and have released small reconnaissance creatures that become violent when they get too far away from the Bionaut.

== Release ==
The film was bought by David DeCoteau and 200 VHS copies were distributed in 1991. There were only 200 copies sold, before it was withdrawn for poor sales.
