= Wee Beastie =

Alcopop brand

Wee Beastie in large (700ml) and small (275ml) bottles

Wee Beastie was a brand of alcopop, as it is commonly referred to. It is part of the RTD (ready to drink) market and is popular in Scotland. It was available in 275ml and 700ml bottles and was 5.4% ABV. The 700ml bottles are labelled "Big Beastie". Wee Beastie is owned and distributed by Inver House Distillers. The drink is described as a carbonated, premixed blend of vodka, taurine and caffeine, flavoured raspberry and blackcurrant. The taste is similar to Red Bull.

In March 2006 the company was told to change their packaging. They were asked to eliminate the cartoonish spider mascots, as they might encourage children to drink it. They also had to tone down the "For Adults Only" warning, as it might appeal to underage drinkers.

This drink has now been discontinued and is no longer being produced.
