= Isaac Cordal =

Spanish artist (born 1974)

- Born: 1974 (age 51–52); Pontevedra, Galicia, Spain
- Education: University of Vigo; Camberwell College of Arts
- Style: Graffiti, sculptor

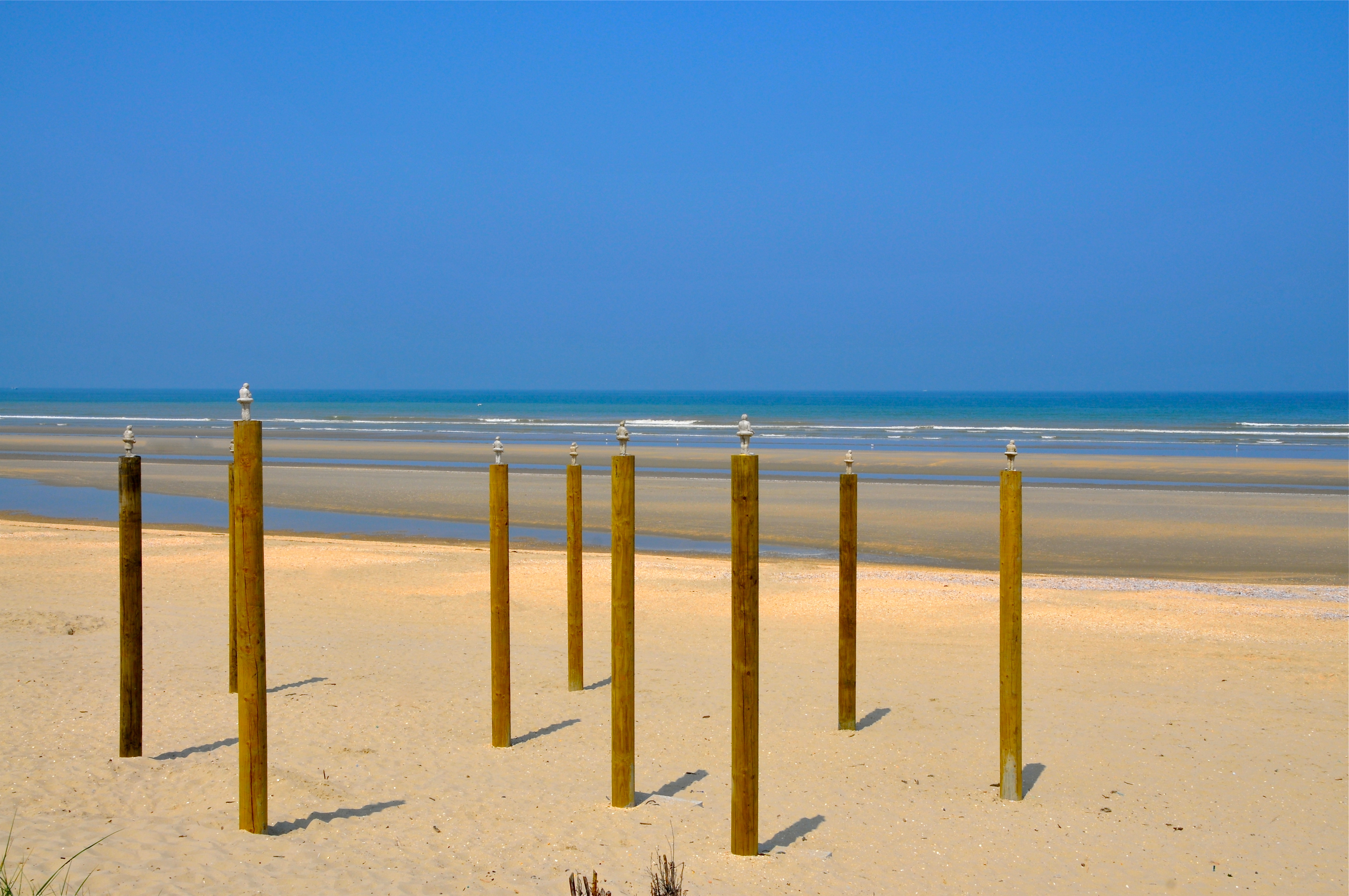
Waiting for climate change (2012)

Isaac Cordal (born 1974) is a Spanish Galician artist whose work involves sculpture and photography in the urban environment. He currently lives in Bilbao.

== Early life ==
Cordal was born in 1974 in Pontevedra, Galicia, Spain. He studied Sculpture at the University of Fine Arts Pontevedra and then studied for five years at the School of Canteiros Pontevedra, a school dedicated to the conservation of stone crafts. He also trained at Camberwell College of Arts in London. Cordal was a founding member of Alg-a.org, a digital art community based in Galicia. He was part of the artistic collective Ludd34560 and Sr. Pause. He was also an active member of the death metal scene in Spain, publishing the fanzine Exorcism and playing guitar in the band Dismal (1992–1998).

== Artistic career ==
Cement Eclipses is one of Coral's best known projects consisting of small cement sculptures photographed in an urban space. His figures can be found pasted on top of bus shelters, walls, cornices. The small size of his works (approximately 15 centimetres (5.9 in)) means it is necessary to pay much attention to find them. The sculptures serve for the artist as a metaphor to reflect on politics, bureaucracy and power. They are presented in various absurd situations in urban space.

His work can be seen both in galleries and urban space. Small nomadic sculptures have been seen in cities like Brussels, London, Berlin, Zagreb, Łódź, Nantes, San Jose, Barcelona, Vienna, Malmö, Paris, Milan, Bogotá, Jyväskylä and Oulu. His work is a critical reflection on the idea of progress, human misery, climate change and the gradual devaluation of human existence, among others topics. Small sculptures represent primarily a social stereotypes, apparently next to businessmen dressed in bright pink lama onesie and wolf slippers, briefcases, timeless beings, as the grey men of Momo by Michael Ende.

== Cement Eclipses Project ==
=== Le Voyage à Nantes - Follow the leaders ===
This was a massive installation presented in 2013 during the summer cultural event Le Voyage à Nantes, located in Plaza du Boffay, one of the most central squares of Nantes. The measurement of the installation was of approximately 20 m x 20 m and it was composed by some 2000 figures and buildings of cement on scale semi destroyed representing a city in ruins.

In a 2012 interview with Agenda Magazine, Cordal explained:

Our gaze is so strongly focused on beautiful, large things, whereas the city also contains zones that have the potential to be beautiful, or that were really beautiful in the past, which we overlook. I find it really interesting to go looking for those very places and via small-scale interventions to develop a different way of looking at our behaviour as a social mass.

=== Waiting for climate change ===
In various projects Cordal has shown interest in topics related to climate change. During the triennal Beaufort04, he presented a series of sculptures of individuals on the top of poles wearing lifebuoys and 'waiting' for the climate change. An ironic proposal to reflect on our ineffectiveness with the degradation of the planet. During Le Voyage à Nantes, in the summer of 2013, he presented an installation of floating life-size sculptures in the moat of the castle of the Dukes of Brittany, with businessmen represented cast adrift.

=== Politicians discussing global warming ===
This image is a reproduction of the sculpture installation The Electoral Campaign performed by Cordal in Berlin in 2011. It became popular on the Internet under the title Politicians Discussing Global Warming, although it was actually part of his series called Follow the Leaders.

=== Cement bleak project ===
Sculptures are made with metal grille with the intention of projecting shadows. One of his best-known projects is Cement Bleak, an urban installation held in London in 2009 with strainers modelled in the shapes of faces which became visible with public lightning at night when projecting their shadows on the paving.

== Bibliography ==
=== Personal bibliography ===
- Small interventions in the big cities. Carpet Bombing Culture (UK). 2011
- Cement Eclipses. Le voyage à Nantes. Memo, France. 2013.

=== Collective bibliography ===
- Microworlds. By Margherita Dessanay and Marc Valli
- Untitled. III: This Is Street Art. Gary Shove. 2011
- The Triennial of Contemporary Art by the Sea Beaufort. 2012
- Street Art. Mode d´emploi. Jerome Catz. Flammarion. 2013
- New Street Art. Claude Crommelin. 2013
- Concrete Canvas: How Street Art is Changing the Way Our Cities Look. 2014
