= BEAST (music composition) =

Music composition and modular synthesis software

- Repository: github.com/tim-janik/beast/
- Written in: C++11
- Type: music composition and Modular synthesiser
- License: GNU LGPL
- Website: beast.testbit.eu

Beast is a music composition and modular synthesis application released as free software under the GNU GPL and GNU LGPL licenses, that runs under Unix. It supports MIDI, WAV/AIFF/MP3/OggVorbis/etc audio files and LADSPA modules. It is capable of multitrack editing, unlimited undo/redo support, real-time synthesis support, 32-bit audio rendering, full duplex support, multiprocessor support, conditional MMX/SSE utilisation for plugins, precise timing down to sample granularity, on-demand and partial loading of wave files, on the fly decoding, stereo mixing, FFT scopes, MIDI automation and full scriptability in Scheme. The plugins, synthesis core and the user interface are actively being developed and translated into a variety of languages, regularly assimilating user feedback such as from the Beast_Feature_Requests page. BEAST is an abbreviation for Better Audio System. BSE is an abbreviation for Better Sound Engine, and it implements all the necessary music processing logic required by BEAST in a separate reusable library. The "Better" portion of the names refer to the complexity and many iterations involved in implementing such a "BEAST".

== History ==
As of 2013, the Beast code base has been migrated to LGPL and is mostly written in C++, notable release include:

- 31 December 1999: Version 0.3.0 (pre-alpha) released.
- 2 July 2001: BEAST was packaged up and got included into Debian.
- 2 September 2002: Version 0.4.1 (added support for the extension language GNU Guile).
- 14 April 2003: Version 0.5.1 (BEAST Featuring LADSPA)
- 7 March 2004: Version 0.6.1 (The low latency BEAST Release)
- 13 April 2005: Version 0.6.5 (new tool "bsewavetool")
- 25 May 2005: Version 0.6.6 (maintenance)
- 16 July 2006: Version 0.7.0 (new synthesis modules)
- 28 December 2006: Version 0.7.1 (tunings, CVE fix)
- 10 September 2010: Version 0.7.2 (new instruments, LGPL licensing)
- 9 April 2011: Version 0.7.4 (driver fixes, performance)
- 24 October 2012: Version 0.7.6 (regressions fixes, documentation)
- 19 January 2013: Version 0.7.8 (C++ migration, usability)
- 15 March 2013: Version 0.8.0 (C++11, use of Rapicorn)
- 28 October 2014: Version 0.9.0
- 7 April 2016: Version 0.10.0
