= Beastmaster =

Beastmaster may refer to:

- The Beast Master, a 1959 novel by Andre Norton
- The Beastmaster (film), a 1982 American-West German film loosely based on the novel
  - Beastmaster 2: Through the Portal of Time, a 1991 American film
  - Beastmaster III: The Eye of Braxus, a 1996 American film
- Beastmaster (TV series), an Australian-Canadian-American television series (1999–2002), based on the 1982 film
- "Beastmaster", one of several Final Fantasy character classes
- Beast Master (manga), a manga created by the artist Kyousuke Motomi
- "Beastmaster", an X-Wild song from the album So What
- "The Beastmaster", stage name for American professional wrestler Rick Link (1959–2026)
- Ultimate Beastmaster, a (2017–2018) Netflix reality TV show
