= La Bête =

La Bête is French for "the beast" and may refer to:

- La Bête (card game), an historic French card game, the first to feature bidding
- La Bête (film), a 1975 French horror film by Borowczyk
- La Bête (play), a 1991 comedy by David Hirson
- La Bête (2023 film), a 2023 French film by Bertrand Bonello
