= Operation Faithful Patriot =

Border support operations by US Armed Forces

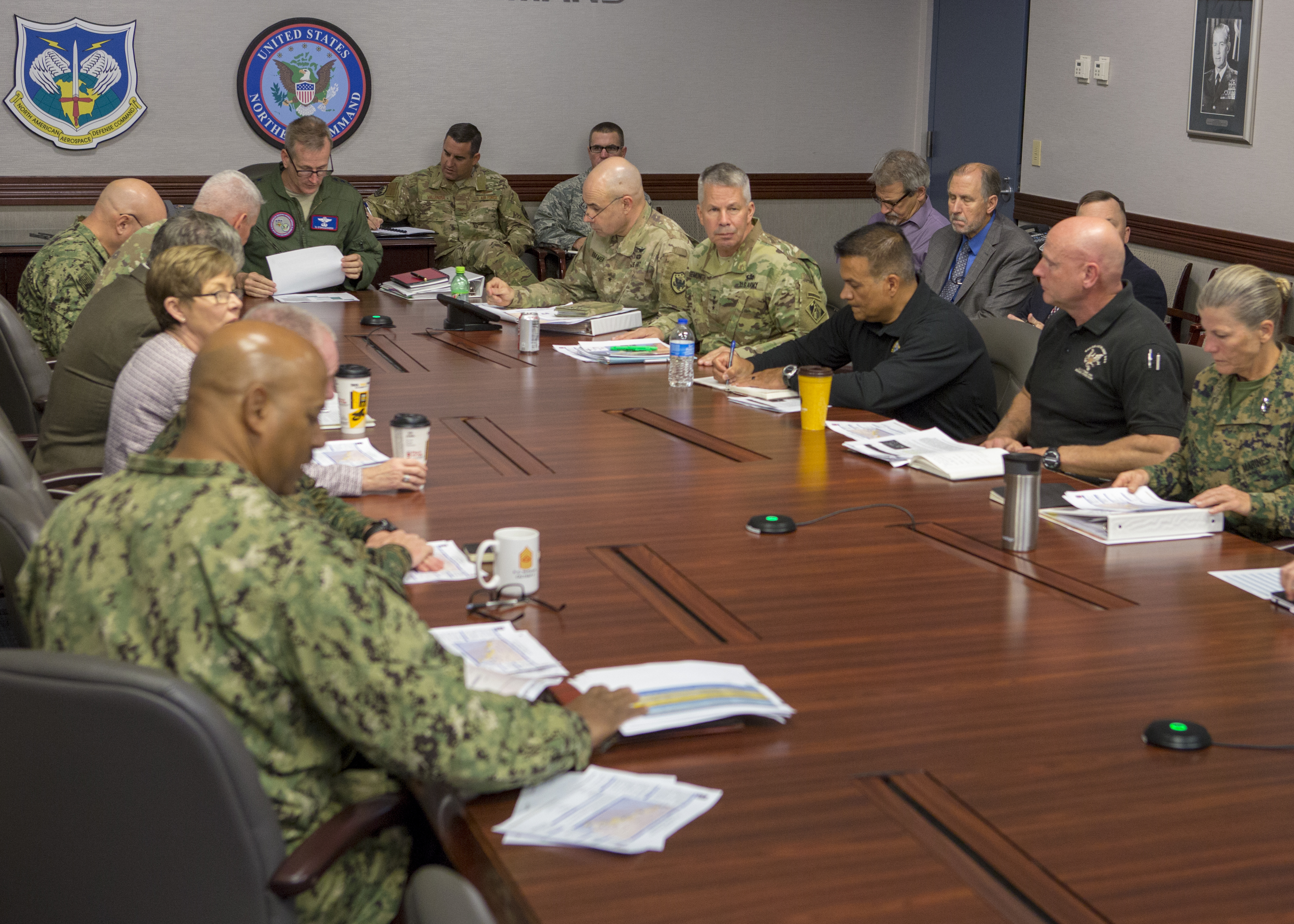
- The Northern Command Battle Staff meet in a planning session with U.S. Customs and Border Protection officials in Colorado Springs, Colorado, on October 28, 2018.
- Type: Border control, Homeland security
- Location: United States
- Objective: Hardening of the Mexico–United States border to prevent a potential border crossing of migrants from Central America.
- Date: October 26, 2018 – present

Border support operations, formerly known as Operation Faithful Patriot, are currently being conducted as a United States Department of Defense domestic deployment and civil contingency at the Mexico–United States border. According to the United States Northern Command, the operation is being conducted in order to prevent a potential border crossing of migrants from Central America. The existing National Guard Operation Guardian Support is also being reinforced.

== Background ==
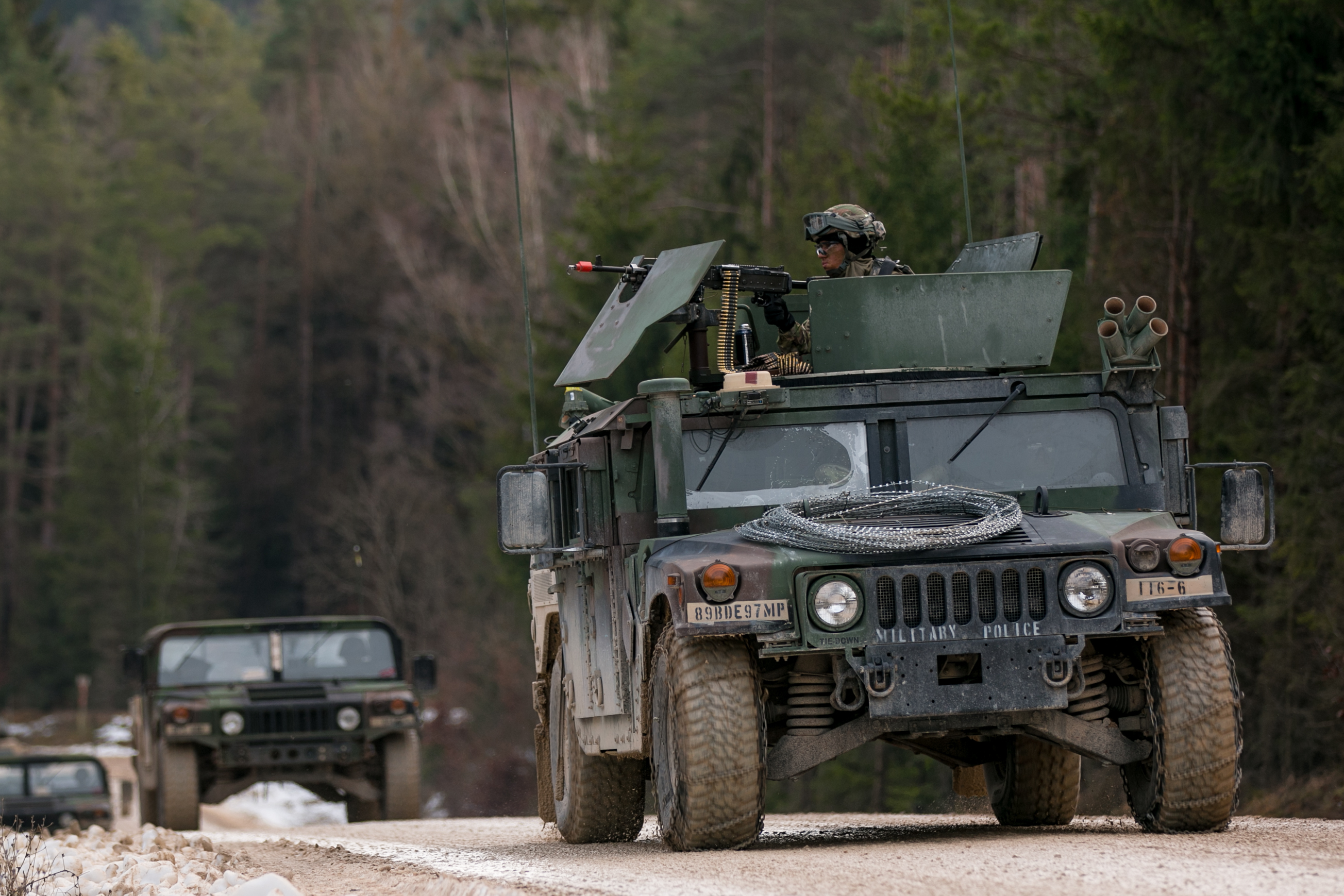
Units participating in border support operations include elements of the United States Army's 89th Military Police Brigade, pictured here in January 2018.

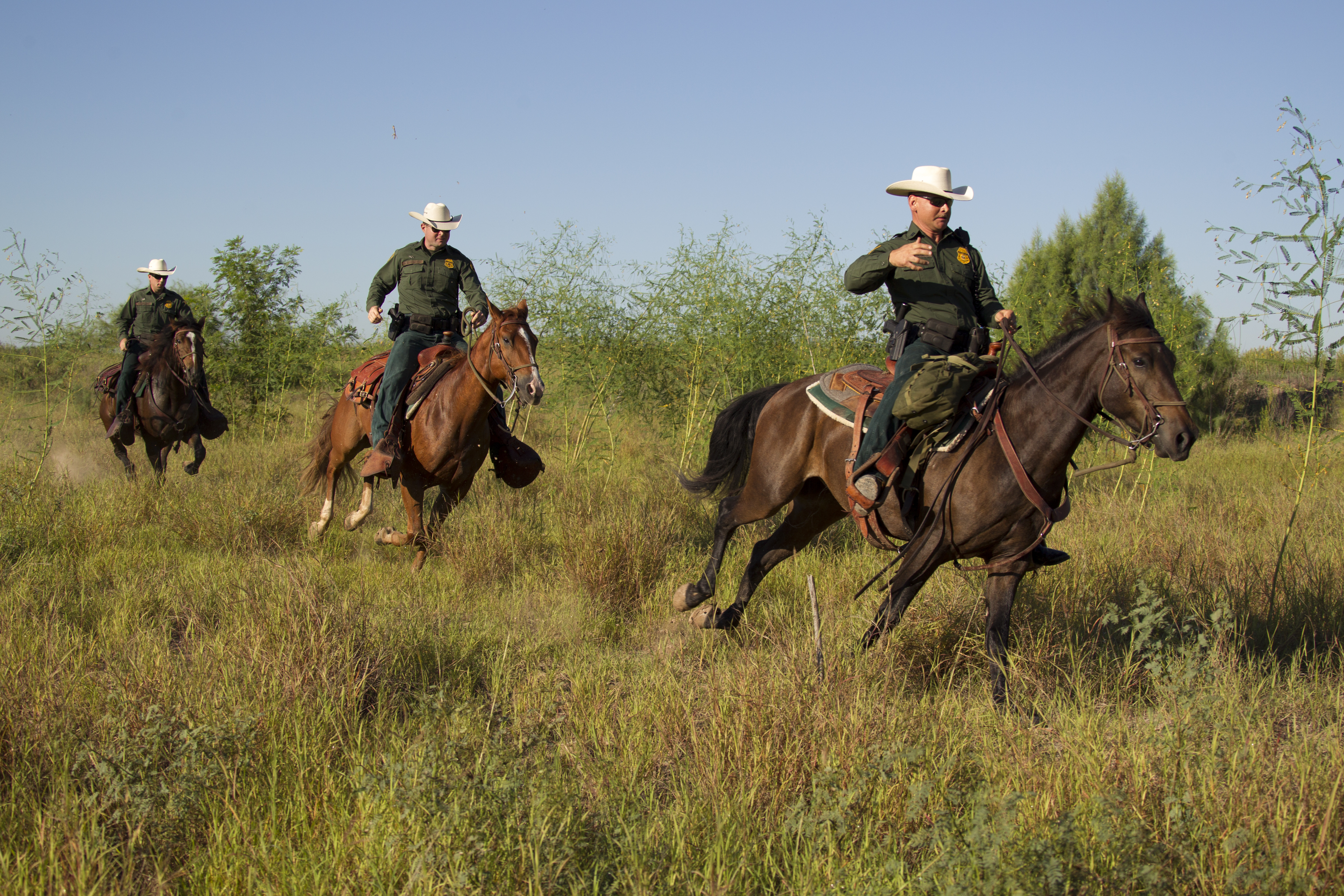
Units involved will provide assistance to the United States Border Patrol (pictured).

A Eurocopter UH-72 Lakota of the Missouri National Guard carrying officers of the Border Patrol's Tucson Sector Mobile Response Team takes off from Marana, Arizona, during Operation Guardian Support in 2018.

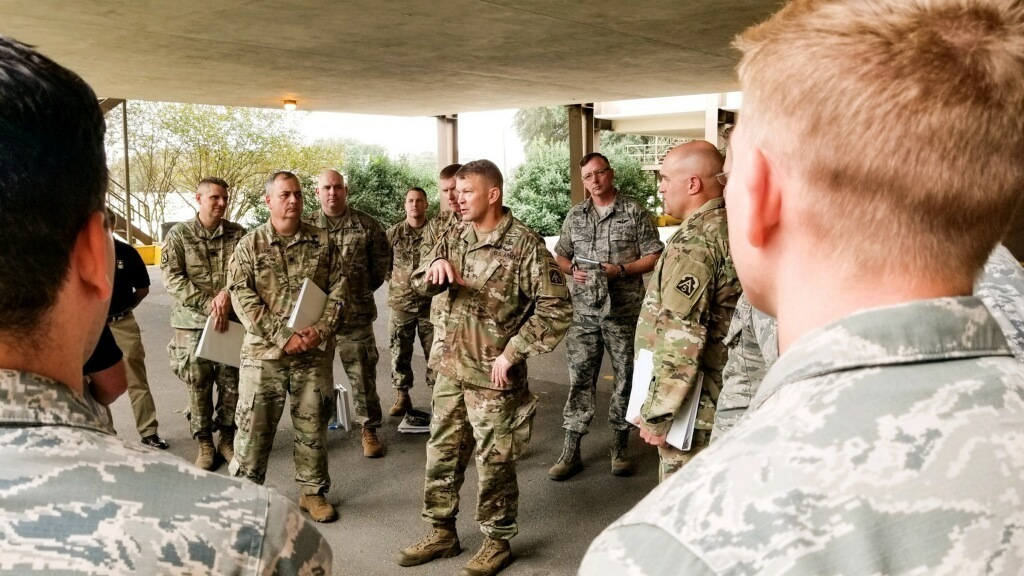
Lt. Gen. Jeffrey Buchanan, U.S. Army North commanding officer, speaks with personnel deployed to Texas as part of border support operations on October 31, 2018.

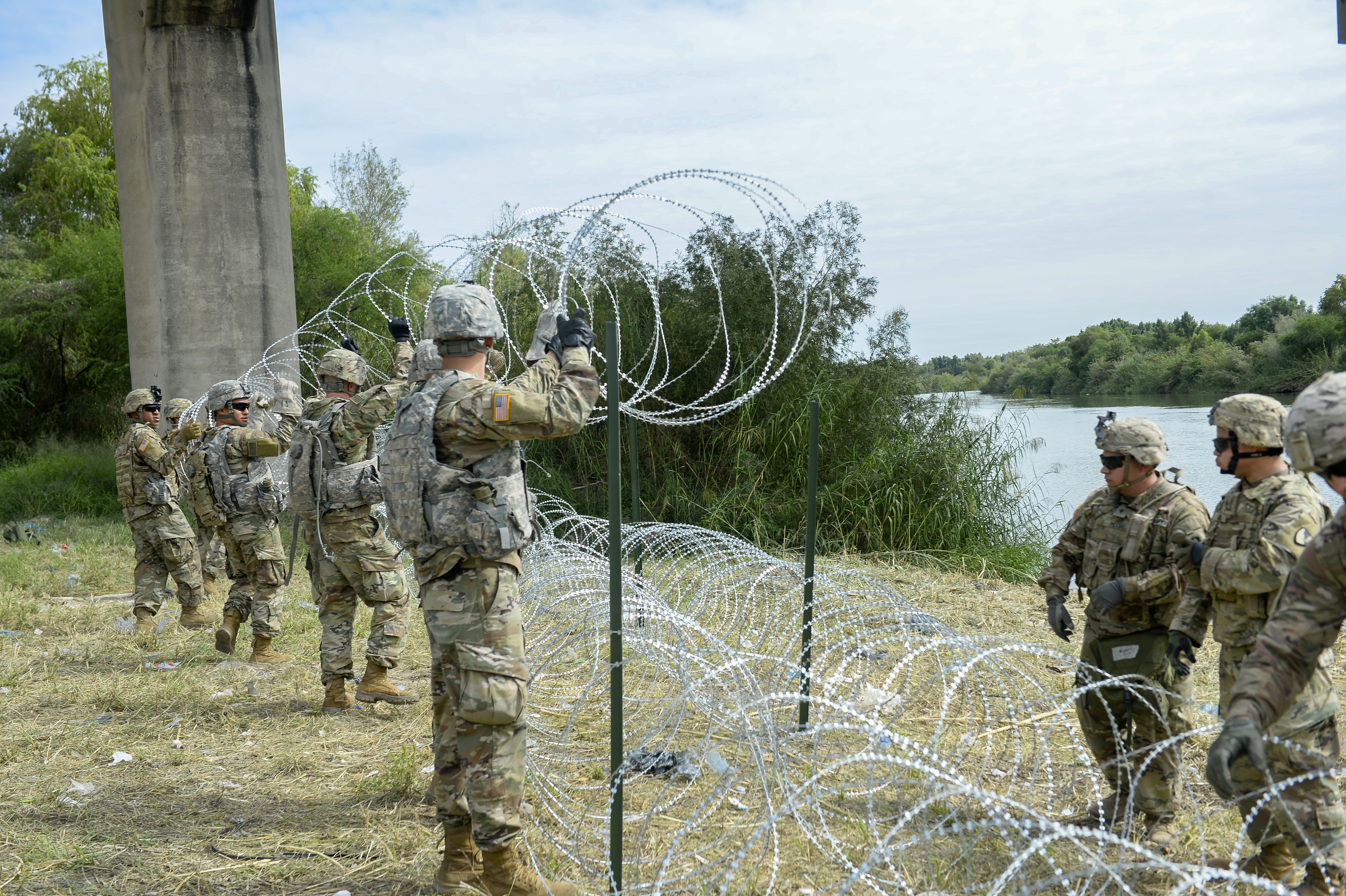
U.S. soldiers lay defensive wire along the banks of the Rio Grande River near Hidalgo, Texas, on November 2, 2018.

In early October 2018, several thousands of people fled gang violence from the Northern Triangle of Central America (NTCA) on an overland journey north in three separate groups colloquially referred to them as "caravans". According to some in the caravans, their intention was to cross through Mexico and later into the U.S. border. In response to the northward migration, and according to Newsweek, U.S. President Donald Trump eventually made his decision to take a hard-line stance against illegal immigration on the Mexican border.

== Timeline ==
In April 2018, President Donald Trump ordered Operation Guardian Support, consisting of National Guard forces voluntarily contributed by states, to assist the United States Border Patrol in ongoing border security efforts.

In October 2018, what was then known as Operation Faithful Patriot was initiated to provide U.S. military assistance to U.S. Customs and Border Protection (CBP) in the southwest United States in confronting the approaching caravans. Trump ordered the operation on October 26, 2018, and United States Secretary of Defense Jim Mattis signed the deployment authorization later that day.

According to General Terrence J. O’Shaughnessy of the United States Northern Command, the operation involves the deployment of federal troops "to harden the southern border" and augment the National Guard forces already involved in aiding the CBP authorities along the United States' southwestern frontier.

By October 29, 2018, approximately 800 soldiers of the initial contingent had been deployed, with military officials confirming the remainder would be in place by the end of that week. Citing an unnamed source, KQED-FM reported the forces were being moved to marshaling areas in California, Texas, and Arizona and, from there, would respond to CBP positioning requests. In addition, the operation called for the supply of United States Army-owned anti-riot gear to the CBP.

On November 7, 2018, the Pentagon announced that the name Operation Faithful Patriot was no longer in use. Instead, the current deployment of troops will be simply referred to as "border support." Defense Secretary Jim Mattis ordered the name change the previous day because the original name had "political overtones." The bulk of the troops arrived in Texas which is hundreds of miles away from the caravans arriving in Tijuana.

Under the Posse Comitatus Act of 1878, federal troops are prohibited from carrying out law enforcement duties. During border support activities, they are not allowed to detain migrants or seize drugs. They have assisted the Border Patrol by maintaining vehicles. Other duties have included using military helicopters to carry border patrol agents to and from locations along the U.S.-Mexico border and operating cranes to install towering panels of metal bars. They have also strung concertina wire and wrapped it around barriers to reinforce the border.

On January 31, 2019, Acting Defense Secretary Patrick M. Shanahan announced that additional troops, likely several thousand, would be deployed to the border. The deployment was expanded to roughly 6,000 troops, drawn from the Marines, Army, Air Force and Navy, and their stay was extended through September 2019. By March, a plan was being prepared to ask the Defense Department for more federal troops to help with migrant processing, transportation and medical care in high-crossing areas. The draft plan includes using Defense Department land to house migrants in detention sites.

On March 23, 2020, in spite of the COVID-19 pandemic across the U.S. and worldwide, Lt. Col. Chris Mitchell said that the Pentagon “has no plans to pull units off the border for coronavirus response” and the Defense Department confirmed that the troops at the border were authorized to stay there through September 30, 2020.

== Army units assigned ==
As of October 29, 2018, a full list of units participating in border support operations had not been released, but activated forces were said to include military police, in addition to combat aviation, combat engineer, medical, and civil affairs units totaling approximately 5,000 U.S. soldiers and 2,000 National Guard troops who are already deployed as part of the existing Operation Guardian Support. A surge force consisting of an additional 7,000 troops had been placed on "24-hour notice" to reinforce the frontier if those personnel proved inadequate.

=== Active Army ===
 1st MLG 7TH ENGINEER SUPPORT BATTLION

SUPPORT COMPANY MOTOR TRANSPORT PLT

- 403rd ICTC ( Inland Corgo Transfer Company) 3rd ESC ( Expadinary Support Command ), Fort Bragg, NC
- 3rd Brigade, 101st Airborne Division (Rakkasans)
- 74th Composite Truck Company, 129th CSSB, Sustainment Brigade, 101st Airborne Division.

==== 1st Engineer Battalion ====
- 41st Engineer Company

==== 16th Military Police Brigade ====
- 503rd Military Police Battalion (ABN,

-65th Military Police Company -108th Military Police Company

- 91st Military Police Battalion

-563rd Military Police Company

- 42nd Military Police Brigade

-66th Military Police Company

==== 36th Engineer Brigade ====
- 62nd Engineer Battalion

==== 89th Military Police Brigade ====
- Headquarters and Headquarters Company
- 287th Military Police Company
- 202D Military Police Company
- 212th Military Police Company
- 591st Military Police Company
- 977th Military Police Company

==== 63rd Expeditionary Signal Battalion ====
- Charlie Company

==== 3rd Combat Aviation Brigade (Hunter Army Airfield) ====
2nd Battalion 82nd Combat Aviation Brigade Fort Bragg, NC, Alpha/Charlie Air Assault Assault Companies, D Co Aviation maint support 2nd Battalion Bravo General Support

3rd Brigade Combat Team, 101st Airborne DIV

==== 3rd Squadron, 89th Cavalry Regiment ====
HHT A Troop B Troop D Forward Sustainment Troop

- Alpha Company, 52nd Brigade Engineer Battalion, 2nd IBCT, 4ID

=== National Guard ===
The existing National Guard mission being reinforced is Operation Guardian Support. The National Guard mission is operating in four task forces: Task Force Anzio, Task Force Salerno, Task Force Defender, and Task Force Aviation. The National Guards of Arizona, Texas, South Carolina, Oklahoma, Georgia, Missouri, Alabama, Florida, and Mississippi have contributed forces to the operation. Virginia, an early contributor to the operation, withdrew its forces in June 2018 on the order of Governor Ralph Northam. 285th Aviation Regiment (Arizona)

- 2nd Battalion Alpha/Bravo Air Assault Assault Companies

==== 72nd Infantry Brigade Combat Team (Texas) ====
- 536th Brigade Support Battalion (elements)

==== 114th Aviation Regiment (Mississippi) ====
- 1st Security and Support Aviation Battalion (elements)

==== 133rd Field Artillery Regiment (Texas) ====
- 3rd Field Artillery Battalion (elements)

==== 151st Aviation Regiment (South Carolina) ====
- 2nd Security and Support Aviation Battalion (elements)

== Service medal ==
The Armed Forces Service Medal will be awarded to troops who have deployed to the border. The AFSM may be awarded to service members who have participated, as members of U.S. military units, in a designated U.S. military operation deemed to be a significant activity and encounter no foreign armed opposition or imminent hostile action.

== See also ==
- Defense Support of Civil authorities
- Operation Jump Start
- Immigration policy of Donald Trump
