= Central American migrant caravans =

Migrant caravan through Mexico

The Northern Triangle of Central America three countries, Guatemala, El Salvador, and Honduras. These countries share a border tripoint at Trifinio Fraternidad Transboundary Biosphere Reserve, and also aspects of classical cultures, history, society, and politics.

Central American migrant caravans, also known as the Viacrucis del migrante ("Migrant's Way of the Cross"), are migrant caravans that travel from Central America to the Mexico–United States border to seek asylum in the United States. The largest and best known of these were organized by Pueblo Sin Fronteras (A People Without Borders) that set off during Holy Week in early 2017 and 2018 from the Northern Triangle of Central America (NTCA), but such caravans of migrants began arriving several years earlier, and other unrelated caravans continued to arrive into late 2018.

There is some disagreement as to whether the migrant caravans are primarily composed of refugees seeking asylum or are merely large concentrations of traditional economic migrants. Numerous human rights organizations document the increase in violence and abuse in recent years in Central American countries. A report by the Geneva Declaration on Armed Violence and Development, cited by Amnesty International, noted that between 2007 and 2012, several Central American countries had the highest average annual female homicide rates in the world, although the average annual male homicide rates in the world are higher. Other studies of the composition of the caravans indicated that the caravans more resemble traditional economic migrants. The causes of the migration, as well as the proper way to settle or deport the migrants themselves, remains a source of political debate within the U.S.

== Causes of the migration ==
Drought and crop failure in the Central American dry corridor and climate change in Honduras have been factors in the formation of the caravans. Honduras is one of the poorest and most violent countries in Central America. The country experienced a coup d'état in 2009 and is one of the most unequal countries in the world, while the poverty rate stood at 64.3% in 2018.

According to the newspaper Le Monde, "Caught between extreme poverty and ultra-violence, more and more Hondurans are choosing to flee their country, driven by the most extreme despair". An opposition Honduran politician considers that migrants "do not run after the American dream, they flee the Honduran nightmare".

=== First caravans ===
Those that antedated 2017 were smaller affairs. However, claims that they did not reach the border before 2017 are misinformed. They were not well covered, but they would arrive at the border in Tijuana, not Texas.

These "Stations of the Cross" migrant caravans have been held in southern Mexico for at least the last five years [2013–2018]. They began as short processions of migrants, some dressed in biblical garb and carrying crosses, as an Easter-season protest against the kidnappings, extortion, beatings and killings suffered by many Central American migrants as they cross Mexico. Individuals in the caravans often try to reach the U.S. border but usually not as part of the caravan. The caravans typically don't proceed much farther north than the Gulf coast state of Veracruz.

=== 2017 caravan ===
Pueblo Sin Fronteras supported its first Holy Week caravan in 2017.

On 25 March 2018, a group of about 700 migrants (80% from Honduras) began their way north from Tapachula. By 1 April, the caravan had arrived in Matías Romero, Oaxaca, and grown to about 1,200 people. In mid-April, 500 migrants continued northward from Mexico City—the caravan's last official stop—toward Tijuana, in separate groups riding atop freight train cars. Two busloads of the migrants arrived in Tijuana on 25 April and a further four busloads were making their way from Hermosillo. On 29 April 2018, after traveling 2,500 miles (4,000 km) across Mexico, the migrants' caravan came to an end in Tijuana, at the Mexico–United States border at Friendship Park.

More than 150 migrants prepared to seek asylum from United States immigration officials. United States Attorney General Jeff Sessions called the caravan "a deliberate attempt to undermine our laws and overwhelm our system". On 30 April, Sessions' Justice Department announced criminal charges against eleven people for crossing the border illegally.

American aid worker Scott Warren with the organization No More Deaths was arrested on 12 May on charges of illegally harboring people in the country, hours after releasing a report accusing the U.S. Border Patrol of tampering with water sources for migrants crossing the Arizona desert. He pleaded not guilty and was ultimately acquitted in November 2019.

== Late 2018 caravan ==
Late 2018 caravan

Migrants from Honduras, Guatemala, Nicaragua, and El Salvador gathered on 12 October to meet at San Pedro Sula, the second largest city in Honduras. The caravan began the next day, intending to reach the United States to flee from violence, poverty, and political repression. The caravan began with about 160 migrants but quickly gathered over 500 participants as it marched through Honduras. Bartolo Fuentes, a former Honduran congressman and one of the march coordinators, stated that the goal of the caravan was to find safety in numbers as it traveled north. Though he was at first convinced that the caravan was a spontaneous movement, Fuentes has since told several news agencies that the caravan was organized and popularized through a faked social media account bearing his own name and photograph, which has since been deleted from Facebook. Fuentes says he first heard about the fake account from Irineo Mujica of the organization Pueblo Sin Fronteras. The same day it left, United States Vice President Mike Pence urged the presidents of Honduras, El Salvador, and Guatemala to persuade their citizens to stay home. Honduran President Juan Orlando Hernández advised his citizens to return home and to "not let yourselves be used for political purposes". Pueblo Sin Fronteras did not organize the October caravan, but expressed its solidarity with it. Irineo Mujico, the director of Pueblo Sin Fronteras, did not himself recommend another caravan to the United States, instead advising its members to seek asylum in Mexico.

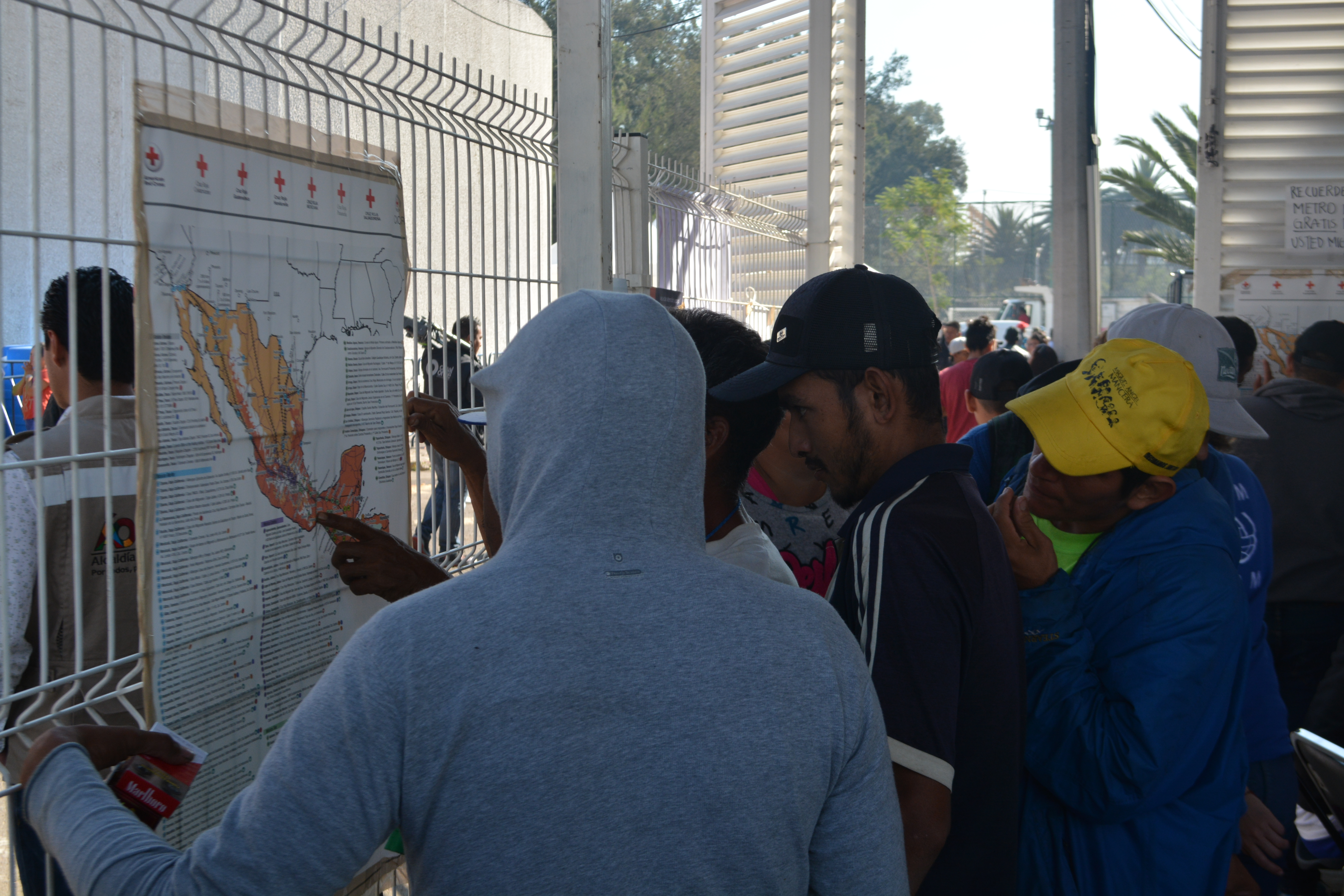
Migrants looking for routes on a map of Mexico, November 2018

As the caravan passed through the Guatemalan city of Chiquimula, Fuentes was arrested by police and deported. Other Hondurans, traveling on buses, had their papers seized or were arrested, forcing migrants to travel on foot. On entering Tecún Umán on 18 October 2018, the caravan numbered around 5,000, but began shrinking due to the speed of parts of the caravan and its reception in shelters in Tecún Umán. The same day, U.S. President Donald Trump threatened to deploy the U.S. military and close the U.S.–Mexico border to keep the caravan from entering the country. Trump also threatened to cut aid to countries allowing the caravans to pass through. Also on 18 October, Mexico flew two Boeing 727s transporting Federal Police officers to the Guatemala–Mexico border. The next day, 19 October, an estimated 4,000 migrants had gathered in Ciudad Tecún Umán in Guatemala. Mexican officials, including the ambassador to Guatemala, requested that migrants appear individually at the border for processing. The migrants ignored the request, and marched on the bridge, overwhelming Guatemalan police and Mexican barriers on the bridge, then entered Ciudad Hidalgo, Chiapas, and encountered Federal Police in riot gear. After an hour-long standoff with police, whom migrants threw shoes and stones at, tear gas was used to push the migrants back onto the bridge. Officials reported that at least six Mexican police officers had been injured. After hostilities ended, migrants formed into lines and began processing by Mexican authorities. By the mid-afternoon, migrants were allowed entry in Mexico and were taken by bus to Tapachula. According to the Commissioner of the Federal Police, Manelich Castilla Craviotto, this was for processing and shelter. Migrants with valid visas and documentation were allowed immediate entrance, while asylum-seekers would be detained in a migration center for 45 days.

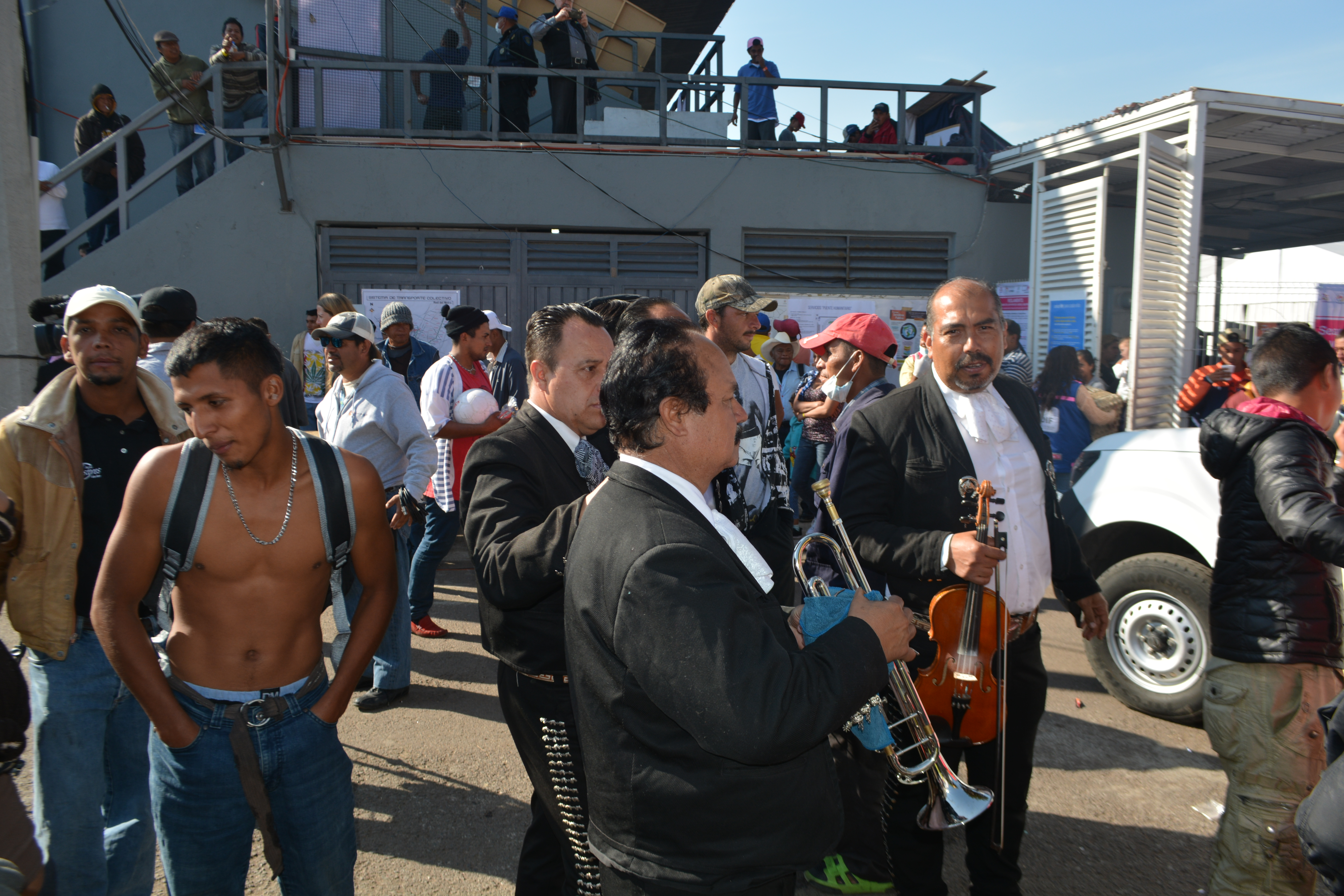
Migrants hearing a mariachi, Mexico City, November 2018

On 20 October, about 2,000 migrants who had crossed the Suchiate River and entered Ciudad Hidalgo decided to rebuild the caravan to continue their trek to the United States. The caravan again resumed its march early on 21 October from Tapachula. A force of 700 Federal Police officers, mostly women, formed a human barricade on the Suchiate–Tapachula highway, but withdrew as the 5,000-strong caravan of migrants came within 200 meters (660 ft). By the afternoon, the migrants reached Tapachula and its leaders decided to rest there, 40 kilometers (25 mi) inside Mexico. Their march began again the next day, bound for Huixtla, another 40 kilometres (25 mi) away from Tapachula. Simultaneously, Guatemalan officials reported that another thousand migrants entered the country from Honduras, while another 1,000 migrants were reported making for Tapachula from Ciudad Hidalgo.

Irineo Mujica was arrested in Ciudad Hidalgo on 22 October while walking with a group of migrants to a church. Mujica was pulled out of a crowd of migrants by Mexican authorities and pushed into a white van. According to Pueblo Sin Fronteras, he was not involved in organizing the caravan and was conducting humanitarian work in Tapachula. Mujica has since claimed that he and Pueblo Sin Fronteras were initially opposed to the timing of this migrant caravan, because they believed it would be used to build anti-immigration sentiment during the 2018 US midterm election.

Also on 22 October, President Donald Trump said the U.S. would begin curtailing tens of millions of dollars in aid to three Central American nations, because they did not stop the caravan. President Trump also threatened to send the U.S. military to close the border and stop the caravan.

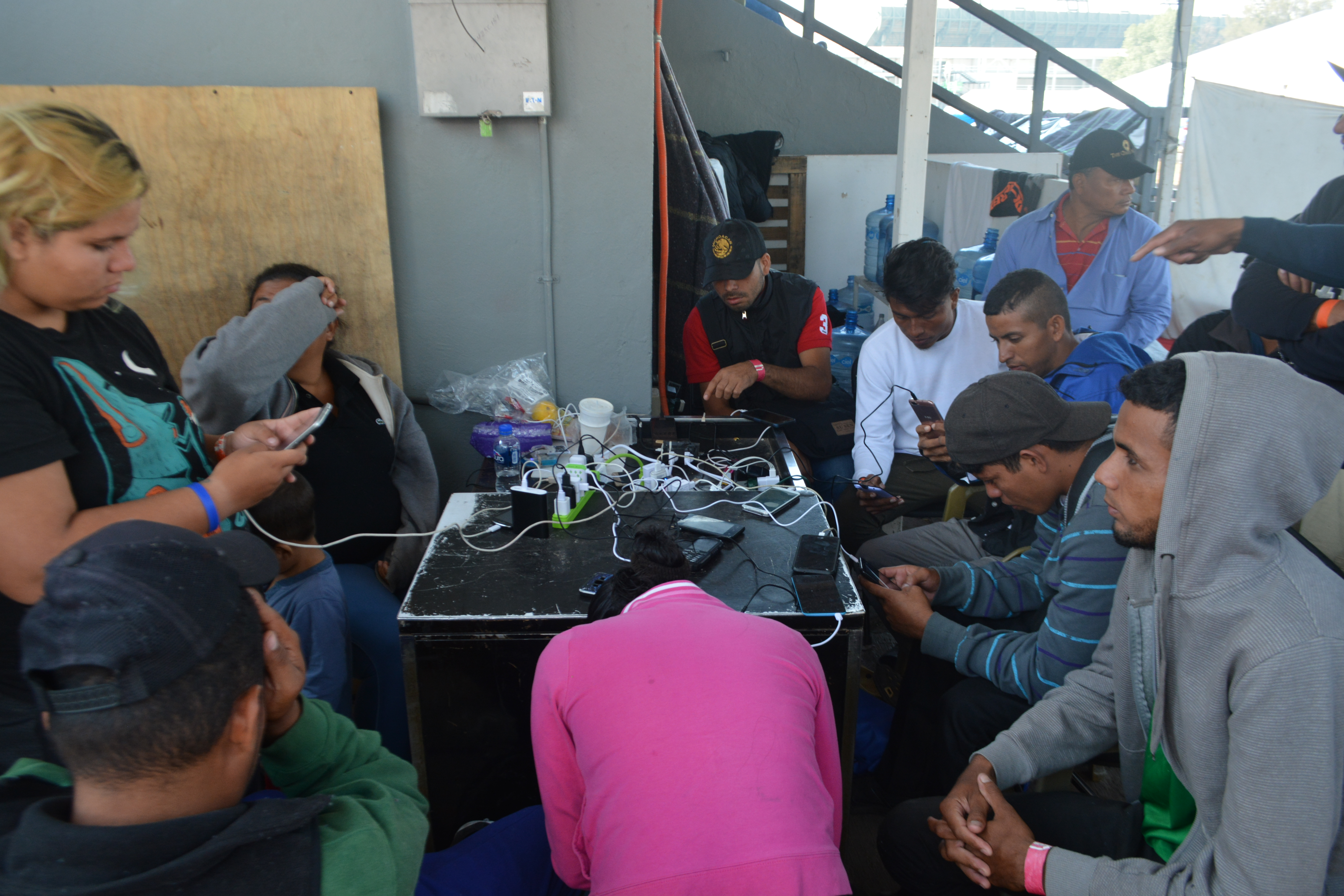
Central American migrants charging their phones, Mexico City, November 2018

On 26 October, when the caravan was in the Arriaga Municipality of the state of Chiapas, Mexican President Enrique Peña Nieto unveiled his program entitled "Estás en tu casa" ("You are at home"). This initiative allows caravan migrants meeting certain criteria to receive benefits and begin to normalize their immigration status in Mexico. Migrants who follow Mexican laws and are granted refugee status will, according to the plan, be entitled to temporary work permits and IDs, medical attention, housing in local establishments, and schooling for children. In order to qualify, however, migrants must agree to settle in the states of Chiapas or Oaxaca and not continue to move north.

As the second caravan entered Mexico on 30 October, the main body of some 4,000 migrants, at Santiago Niltepec, demanded "safe and dignified" transportation to Mexico City. Migrants still crossing into Mexico over the Suchiate river were dissuaded by Mexican helicopters and police.

"The fact that the first of these caravans was able to move from Honduras into Guatemala and then into Mexico is inspiring other migrants to travel in large groups, reversing the long-established logic of Central American migration to the United States: Rather than trying to travel undetected, some migrants are trading invisibility for safety in numbers."
- Kirk Semple and Elisabeth Malkin for The New York Times, 31 October 2018 "...at least 100 were "kidnapped" (exhausted walkers were lured into vehicles) in the state of Puebla and allegedly handed over to the Zetas gang..."

Some scientists contend that the impact of climate change is causing crop failures and exacerbating poverty in Central America, thereby creating what the United Nations High Commissioner for Refugees has called "climate refugees." According to Robert Albro, a researcher at the Center for Latin American and Latino Studies at American University, "The main reason people are moving is because they don't have anything to eat. This has a strong link to climate change – we are seeing tremendous climate instability that is radically changing food security in the region."

=== Table ===
Late 2018 Central American migrant caravan
Date	Place	State	Total Distance	Population	Source
12 October	San Pedro Sula	Honduras	0 km (0 mi)	160	
13 October	Santa Rosa de Copán	Honduras	171 km (106 mi)	1,000	
14 October	Ocotepeque	Honduras	265 km (165 mi)	1,700	
15 October	Esquipulas	Chiquimula, Guatemala	287 km (178 mi)	1,600	
16 October	Chiquimula	Chiquimula, Guatemala	353 km (219 mi)	2,000	
18 October	Ciudad de Guatemala	Guatemala	408 km (254 mi)	3,000	
19 October	Ciudad Tecun Uman	San Marcos, Guatemala	653 km (406 mi)	3,000	
21 October	Tapachula	Chiapas, Mexico	687 km (427 mi)	7,000	
24 October	Huixtla	Chiapas, Mexico	728 km (452 mi)	4,500–7,200	
25 October	Mapastepec	Chiapas, Mexico	791 km (492 mi)	4,000–5,000	
26 October	Tonala	Chiapas, Mexico	914 km (568 mi)	3,600–5,500	
27 October	Arriaga	Chiapas, Mexico	938 km (583 mi)	3,500	
28 October	Tapanatepec	Oaxaca, Mexico	980 km (610 mi)	4,000	
30 October	Santiago Niltepec	Oaxaca, Mexico	1,080 km (670 mi)	4,000	
31 October	Juchitán de Zaragoza	Oaxaca, Mexico	1,165 km (724 mi)	4,000–6,000	
2 November	Matías Romero	Oaxaca, Mexico	1,219 km (757 mi)	4,000	
3 November	Isla, Veracruz	Veracruz, Mexico	1,400 km (870 mi)	4,000	
5 November	Mexico City	Greater Mexico City, Mexico	1,885 km (1,171 mi)	4,500–6,000	
10 November	Santiago de Querétaro	Querétaro, Mexico	2,112 km (1,312 mi)	6,531	
11 November	Irapuato	Guanajuato, Mexico	2,225 km (1,383 mi)	?	
13 November	Guadalajara	Jalisco, Mexico	2,463 km (1,530 mi)	2,000	
14 November	Escuinapa	Sinaloa, Mexico	2,850 km (1,770 mi)	2,000	
15 November	Tijuana	Baja California, Mexico	4,980 km (3,090 mi)	1,500	

=== Border actions ===
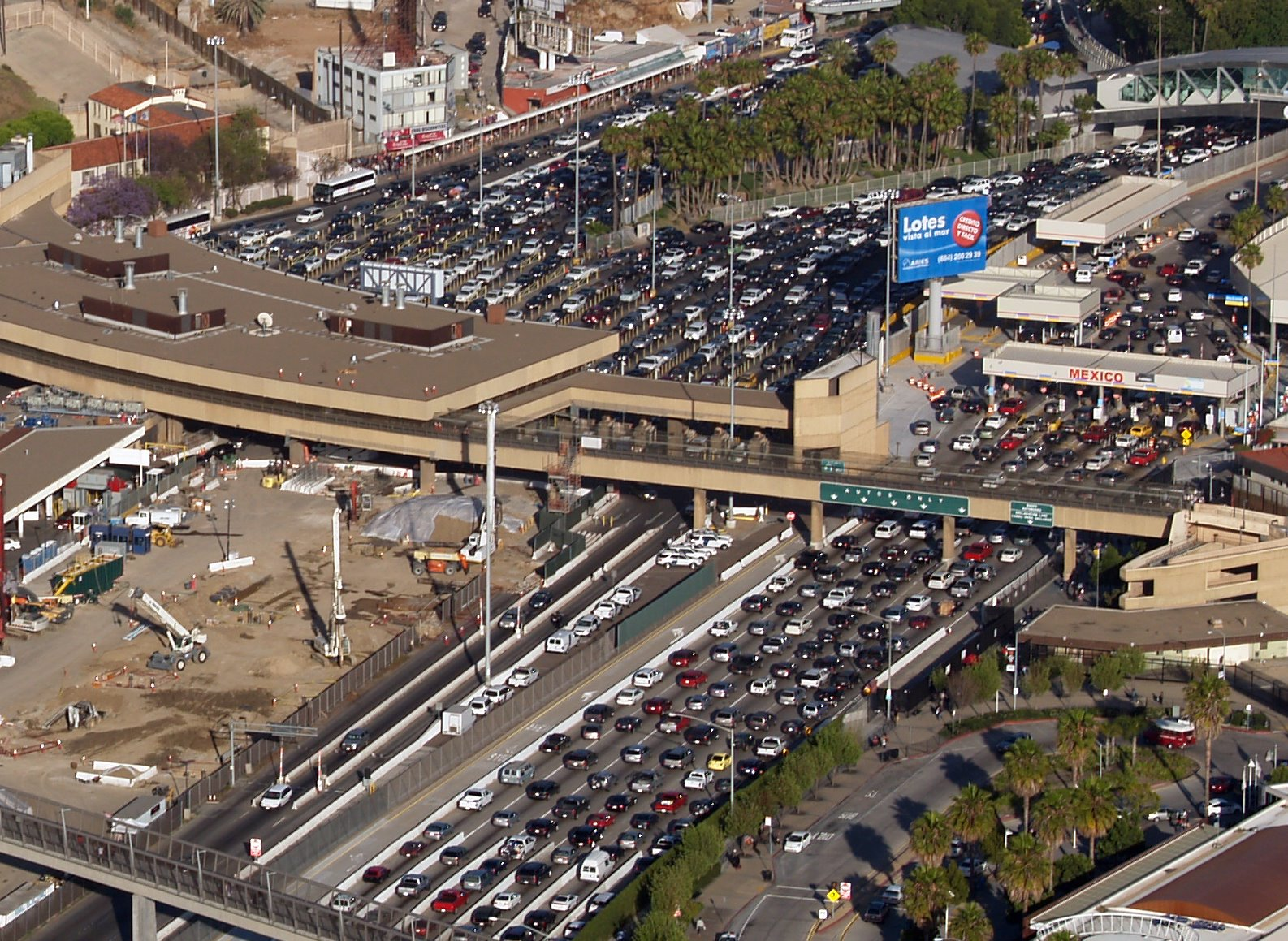
The normally busy San Ysidro Border Crossing was closed on November 25, 2018, after migrants rushed Mexican border guards.

A week before the 2018 midterm elections, the US Government sent 5,200 active-duty soldiers to the US-Mexico border to "harden" it further. 2,100 National Guard troops were already present.

On November 23, mayor of Tijuana Juan Manuel Gastélum declared a "humanitarian crisis" in response to the large number of migrants in the city. By this date, over 5,000 members of the caravan were staying at the Tijuana Stadium— a structure with a capacity of 3,000.

On November 25, a group of approximately 500 migrants marched to the San Ysidro Port of Entry to demand answers. Frustrated by the slow pace of asylum application processing (approximately 60 per day) and the dire living conditions in their tent cities, they attempted to bypass the Mexican Federal Police to reach the border wall when a commotion occurred. A member of the caravan was caught on video throwing rocks at border agents while at the border wall. In response, the United States Border Patrol launched tear gas over the border at the group, which included women and children, and subsequently shut down the crossing for six hours. Photographs of the incident received significant media attention and sparked extensive international commentary. 42 migrants were arrested, and a total of 4 Border agents were struck by rocks.

=== Political reaction in the U.S. ===
In the United States, the migrant caravan was a major issue for President Donald Trump and other Republicans and conservatives in the 2018 midterm elections. Immigrant invasion rhetoric and George Soros conspiracy theories were used by conservative commentators on Fox News. The caravan was described as an "invading horde" by Laura Ingraham, an "invasion" by Steve Doocy, "a full-scale invasion by a hostile force" by Michelle Malkin, "a criminal involvement on the part of these leftist mobs" and "a highly organized, very elaborate sophisticated operation" by Chris Farrell. According to closed captioning transcripts, the word "invasion" was used in relation to the caravan more than 60 times on Fox News in October 2018 and more than 75 times on Fox Business. Commentators noted that mentions of the caravan by Fox News dropped dramatically immediately following the 2018 midterm elections.

Disinformation was promoted by Trump and supporters including the claim that there were "criminals and unknown Middle Easterners" in the caravan, despite the lack of any publicized evidence for this charge. Likewise, Vice President Pence in an interview with Fox News stated:

What the president of Honduras told me is that the caravan was organized by leftist organizations, political activists within Honduras, and he said it was being funded by outside groups, and even from Venezuela ... So the American people, I think, see through this—they understand this is not a spontaneous caravan of vulnerable people.

The president of Honduras at the time, Juan Orlando Hernández, was a member of the right-wing National party and an opponent of the Venezuelan government led by Nicolás Maduro.

The Twitter account of the Department of Homeland Security "confirmed" that within the caravan there were people who are "gang members or have significant criminal histories," but did not offer any evidence of ties. NRATV alleged that "a bevy of left-wing groups" were working with George Soros and the Venezuelan government "to try to influence the 2018 midterms by sending Honduran migrants north in the thousands".

On November 2, 2018, five days before the election, the Department of Homeland Security website issued a press release, "Myth vs. Fact: Caravan", stating that "over 270 individuals along the caravan route have criminal histories, including known gang membership". It cited no sources for the specific numbers and crimes claimed, but did cite Mexican officials to back up their claim that the caravan contained criminal groups. The DHS also claimed the caravan contained migrants from Afghanistan, Somalia, India and Bangladesh, though they didn't cite any sources.

One study by the National Center for Risk and Economic Analysis of Terrorism Events (CREATE) at the University of Southern California and the Institute for Defense Analyses stated that the Central American immigrants traveling to the U.S. and claiming asylum had more in common with economic migrants than traditional refugees. Both groups receive funding or sponsorship from the US government.

=== Reactions in Mexico ===
Mexican President Andrés Manuel López Obrador said: "Obviously, we have to help because Central American migrants pass through our territory and we have to bring order to this migration, make sure it's legal."

Initially positive, the Mexican public's sentiment soured rapidly. El Universal's October 2018 survey found that 64.5% of the Mexican public believed that Central American migrants increased violence or unemployment; this figure increased to 73% in the following month's survey. 56% of the public believed that López Obrador needs to be "tougher" on future migrants.

The 2019 survey found that 58% of Mexican respondents oppose migration from Central America.

== Late 2020 caravans ==
As the United States prepared for elections in 2020 unknown groups promoted messages on social media sites for another caravan.

In October 2020, migrant caravans from Honduras were either intercepted by Guatemalan Army officers and deported back to Honduras upon reaching the border crossings, or evaded border restrictions and reached Guatemala City, with intent to continue their journey to Mexico. The Mexican military and border police have repeatedly warned that no migrant caravans will be allowed to cross into Mexico.

== Early 2021 caravans ==
After Joe Biden won the 2020 United States presidential election, there was a resurgence in migrant caravan activities. Fox News claimed this to be related to Biden's planned amnesty for undocumented immigrants within his first 100 days in office.

On January 13, just one week prior to the Joe Biden's presidential inauguration, more than 3,000 people departed Honduras and El Salvador for the United States. That number grew to approximately 7,000-8,000 one week later.

On January 16, Guatemala and Mexico deployed the military to their borders, in an attempt to stop the migrant caravan from transiting through their countries on the way to the United States. Three days later, the migrant caravans reportedly dissolved in the Guatemalan-Honduran border region, and most its participants were deported back to Honduras.

== 2022 caravans ==
From June 2022, up to 15,000 migrants, mostly from Central America and Venezuela, set out from the southern Mexico city of Tapachula in a caravan bound to the United States. On 5 July, a caravan of almost 7,000 people departed from Tapachula. They broke up in Huixtla after two days.

On 11 December 2022, a migrant caravan of over 1,000 people crossed illegally into El Paso from Ciudad Juarez.

== 2023–2024 caravans ==
In April and May 2023, caravans of between 2,000 and 3,000 people departed from Tapachula. In October, another caravan of 4,000 people departed from Tapachula.

In December 2023, a migrant caravan called "Exodus for Poverty" totaled between 8,000 and 10,000 arrived in the Mexican state of Chiapas. In January 2024, nearly 2,000 migrants arrived in Oaxaca.

== 2026 caravans ==
In November 2026, a caravan of an estimated 1,500 people set off toward the US border from the city of Tapachula. According to reporting from Al Jazeera, many migrants cited the late 2026 midterm election victory by Democrats gave them hope of crossing. US President Donald Trump threatened to double tariffs on Mexico if the group reached the US border.

== See also ==
- 2014 American immigration crisis
- Asylum in the United States
- Brooks County, Texas
- European migrant crisis
- Illegal immigration to the United States
- List of Mexico–United States border crossings
- The Mariel boatlift
- Mexico–United States border crisis
- Missing in Brooks County
- Operation Faithful Patriot
- El tren de la muerte
- Vietnamese boat people
