= Pueblo Sin Fronteras =

Mexican-American advocacy group

Pueblo Sin Fronteras ("Towns without Borders")
- Formation: 2009
- Founder: Roberto Corona
- Founded at: Dallas
- Region served: North America
- Official language: Spanish, English
- Leader: Irineo Mujica
- Website: pueblosinfronteras.org

Pueblo Sin Fronteras (English: People without Borders) is an immigration rights group known for organizing several high-profile migrant caravans in Mexico and Central America. The organization's efforts to facilitate immigration and calls for open borders attracted considerable amounts of coverage in the Mexican and American media. Pueblo Sin Fronteras seeks to "build solidarity bridges among peoples and tear down border walls imposed by greed."

== Operations ==
Pueblo Sin Fronteras, formed in 2009, is a transborder organization made up of activists of diverse nationality and immigration statuses that promotes accompaniment, humanitarian assistance, leadership development, recognition of human rights, and coordination of know-your-rights training along migrant routes, as well as monitoring and raising awareness of human rights. The group builds shelters for migrants on the trek north to the Mexican-American border and provides legal counsel to them. Activists affiliated with the group are present in the United States, where the organization actively raises funds and organizes protest actions against U.S. immigration policy. The organization is a member organization of the National Day Laborer Organizing Network.

One of the group’s first programs offered classes to day laborers about workplace rights.

The group expanded its work south of the border several years ago, inspired in part by the story of 72 Central American migrants who were kidnapped and massacred by a criminal group in northern Mexico in 2010. It opened two migrant shelters in the notoriously violent border state of Sonora in 2015 and 2016.

The organization is notable for coordinating several high-profile migrant caravans in April 2018 and October 2018. These caravans, which traveled from Central America into Mexico, were the subject of widespread media coverage. Unlike the April caravan, the October 2018 caravan was not directly organized by Pueblo Sin Fronteras, with the group instead offering logistical support.

Pueblo Sin Fronteras is sometimes confused with another group of the same name, which no longer exists . The other Pueblo Sin Fronteras, was established in Chicago in 1987 to campaign for immigration reform with a path to citizenship. In 2006, during the campaign to block the deportation to Mexico of Elvira Arellano and separation from her US born son, Pueblo Sin Fronteras changed its name to La Familia Latina Unida Sin Fronteras or FLU.
