= Climate change in Honduras =

Emissions, impacts and responses of Honduras related to climate change

Climate change in Honduras is a major challenge for Honduras as it is one of the countries which is most at risk from climate change. The frequency of natural disasters in Honduras, such as floods, mudslides, tropical storms and hurricanes, is expected to increase as climate change intensifies. Over 40 percent of Hondurans work in the agricultural sector, which is impacted by increasing temperatures and reduced rainfall. However, agriculture could be dramatically impacted, which can hurt certain households in Honduras. Sanitation and food access is a major issue that is increasing due to climate change, as well as the loss of habitats for several endangered organisms.

== Greenhouse gas emissions ==
Honduras contributes only 0.1 percent of global greenhouse gas emissions.

== Impacts on the natural environment ==
=== Temperature and weather changes ===
Köppen climate classification map for Honduras for 1980–2016

2071–2100 map under the most intense climate change scenario. Mid-range scenarios are currently considered more likely

=== Ecosystems ===
The chortiheros wesseli is a type of freshwater organism that will be affected by climate change in Honduras. Its habitat is limited to only a few areas, and with the dramatic changes in climate, it is not likely they will be able to find another habitat nearby that is equally as suitable.

This organism was found to rely most on the width of the river, mud substrate, and depth of the water, which can all be affected by the quickly changing climate. A study on the sustainability of the chortiheros wesseli, published by Scientific Reports, estimates that a less suitable habitat for these organisms will most likely be a result of climate change. The consequences of climate change will impact this species and possibly alter their food web. Freshwater ecosystems are extremely threatened by climate change, and even protected areas are dealing with the repercussions.

A 2013 bark beetle outbreak destroyed a quarter of all forests in Honduras.

== Impacts on people ==
=== Economic impacts ===
Honduras is one of the poorest countries in Latin America, which makes it even more difficult to have clean water, sanitation, sources of food, etc. The demographics most affected by climate change are those with high risk, like children, elderly, and natives. Since these people and their families don't have access to the correct amenities for their health, this has a direct impact on their household environment and the health of those living in it.

Additionally, natural disasters are common in Latin and Central America, so these have taken a huge toll on the shelters and lifestyles of those living in Honduras. Climate change will make these natural disasters, like floods, hurricanes, and tropical storms, even more prevalent.

==== Agriculture ====
Climate change will cause the decline of crops and therefore, reduce the yields of crops. With the climate constantly changing, food security for those in Honduras is uncertain in the future.

=== Impacts on migration ===
Drought in Honduras has become a driver of emigration, causing poor crop yields for poor subsistence farmers, and has been a factor in the formation of migrant caravans to the United States. According to the FAO, migrants leaving central and western Honduras between 2014 and 2016 most frequently cited "no food" as their reason for leaving.

== See also ==
- Central American dry corridor
