= Dry Corridor =

Ecological region in Central America

Map showing the dry corridor of Central America

The Dry Corridor or Central American Dry Corridor (CADC) is a tropical dry forest region on the Pacific Coast of Central America. This area, which extends from southern Mexico to Panama, is extremely vulnerable to climate change due to much of the population living in rural areas and in poverty, and thus dependent on grain crops for their livelihood. Climate change's effects on the region have increased the severity of droughts because of increased evaporation, reduced soil moisture, and salinization of freshwater resources.

Particularly vulnerable to climate change are the areas of Guatemala, El Salvador, and Honduras. Since 2001, these areas have suffered from irregular drought patterns due to changes in the El Niño-Southern Oscillation (ENSO). During an El Niño event in 2009 (the year the term "Dry Corridor" was penned), it is estimated that 50-100% of crops in these regions were affected by the water deficit, and between 2014 and 2016, millions of people in the dry corridor needed food aid due to drought during this period, which resulted in losses of the corn crop. By 2018, experts estimated that at least 25% of households in the region experienced food insecurity. As a result, relief agencies have been advised to take a "Food first" response when addressing this crisis, focusing initially on areas at highest risk of food insecurity.

== History ==
Drought impact has been especially severe in Honduras and Guatemala. Spain colonized Central America in the 16th Century, with ambitions of wealth, religious conversion, and territorial accumulation. The Audiencia of Guatemala was established in 1543 and encompassed present-day Guatemala, Honduras, Nicaragua, and Costa Rica. This region was under Spanish control until independence movements in the early 19th century. Ultimately, this colonization conquest decreased Indigenous populations and introduced forced labor. Currently, 90% of Central America's population lives in the Dry Corridor. 80% of people living in the Dry Corridor experience poverty.

== Drought and Climate Change ==
There is strong evidence that there is a strong correlation between climate change and severe drought events. Land and ocean evaporation increases as global warming occurs, reducing soil moisture. Similarly, global warming is expected to aggravate precipitation patterns.

Moreover, projections indicate that agricultural droughts are projected to increase because, with more evaporation, there will be less runoff. Global warming has led to rising sea levels, thus salinizing aquifers and estuaries, making this water unavailable. As a result, water supply droughts will occur, as people will need to depend more on other freshwater sources, like groundwater. Ultimately, climate change leads to more variability and severity in droughts. Specifically, people living in the Dry Corridor are heavily dependent on agriculture. Droughts affect water resources and thus agricultural yields.

2019 was the fifth straight year of drought, and the "second consecutive year of failed yields for subsistence farmers." The region's climate is increasingly characterized by higher temperatures and prolonged dry periods. Concurrently, agricultural pests have proliferated, seasonal rains have become less predictable or entirely absent, and the frequency and intensity of flooding events have escalated.

An effort to aid farmers in this climate crisis is led by the UN Environment Programme. They are working with farmers throughout the region to boost the resilience of rural communities and improve food security. Collaboration with the Central American Integration System and the Food and Agriculture Organization of the United Nations is helping to reverse land degradation by planting trees and sharing resources.

== Climate Migration ==
Approximately 8% of families in the region reported that they planned to migrate in an attempt to improve their situations, with the increase in emigration of "500% between 2010 and 2015." A 2018 World Bank report has projected that by 2050 up to 4 million people from Central America and Mexico will become climate change migrants. They will be displaced due to climate-related weather events, if measures are not taken to prevent climate change and adapt agricultural practices. Migrants typically first travel to nearby urban areas, with fewer continuing north to Mexico, and fewer still traveling all the way to the Mexico–United States border.

Climate migration such as that seen in the Dry Corridor is one of the sources of conflict at the US-Mexico border. While some U.S. political figures have described recent migrations in inflammatory terms, officials from U.S. Customs and Border Protection have acknowledged that environmental factors—particularly crop failure—are among the primary drivers of migration from the region.

The United States has played a significant role in the global climate patterns that underlie these migration pressures. Since 1850, the US has been the top contributor to climate change, creating 25% of global greenhouse gas emissions, including carbon dioxide, methane, and nitrous oxide. Transportation is the largest contributing factor, followed by electric power. In comparison, El Salvador and Nicaragua, Honduras, and Guatemala are responsible for .01, .02, and .03 percent of historical greenhouse gas emissions, respectively.

Political theorists and ethicists argue that climate migrants should be allowed entry into the United States as compensation for their displacement and because the US, through its significant contribution to climate change, has harmed those seeking shelter.

== Climate Justice ==
Climate Injustice is the unequal distribution of climate change-related consequences, like health or weather event impacts. It is a global human rights movement aiming to create a more equitable, sustainable future. The effects of climate change disproportionately affect historically marginalized people, such as Indigenous or poverty-stricken communities.

According to the World Food Programme, the climate induced drought and resulting climate migration in the Dry Corridor is a case of climate injustice. Climate and weather variability exacerbate social issues, including food insecurity, poverty, and inequality. Socioeconomic components, like income from agriculture or household wealth status, impact a person's conflict due to climate-related events.

Stakeholders will need to be address improvement from multiple angles, including providing short-term food security and assistance, addressing climate change on a global scale, and sustainable development initiatives to promote robust crop production in these areas facing new climates.

Ultimately, according to the University of Manchester, as the largest contributor to climate change (92%), it is the Global North's responsibility to take steps to mitigate climate change. The Industrial Revolution led up to this point, as burning fossil fuels led to economic growth for countries that had the resources to industrialize. Now, however, it is difficult for many of these countries to provide necessary energy and resources to their citizens in a manner where they will continue to grow their GDP and reduce emissions.

Developing countries, like those located in the Dry Corridor, are the ones who have to deal with the consequences of climate change. They are not equipped with the technology to handle them, thus leading to migration or death. Steps developed countries can take to slow climate change include transitioning to renewable energy sources, sustainable transportation and agriculture, and investment in nature-based solutions. These can include restoration of forests and coastal wetlands and restorative agricultural practices, such as crop rotation.

== See also ==
- Central American migrant caravans
- Climate refugees
- Northern Triangle of Central America
