= Bartolo Fuentes =

Honduran journalist, politician and activist

Bartolo Fuentes is a Honduran journalist, politician and activist. He is one of the leaders of the thousands of Salvadoran, Honduran and Guatemalan migrants who formed caravans to travel overland to seek asylum in the United States in 2018. He is the editor of Vida Laboral magazine and a Honduras Labor website. He is the host of the radio show "Without Borders".

== Career ==
His activism began as a student leader. He edits Vida Laboral magazine and the Honduras Labor website, which focuses on labor and human rights. Fuentes sought refuge in Mexico in the 1980s after receiving threats after protesting against the Nicaraguan Contras. He began organizing migrants in 1999. Beginning in 2013, he served as a deputy in the National Congress of Honduras, for Libertad y Refundación (LIBRE, or Liberty and Refoundation).

Fuentes helped organize a migrant caravan in April 2018. On October 16, as a later caravan entered Guatemala, Fuentes was arrested and returned to Honduras. Fearing persecution by the government, he took refuge in El Salvador.
