= Northern Triangle of Central America =

Three-country region

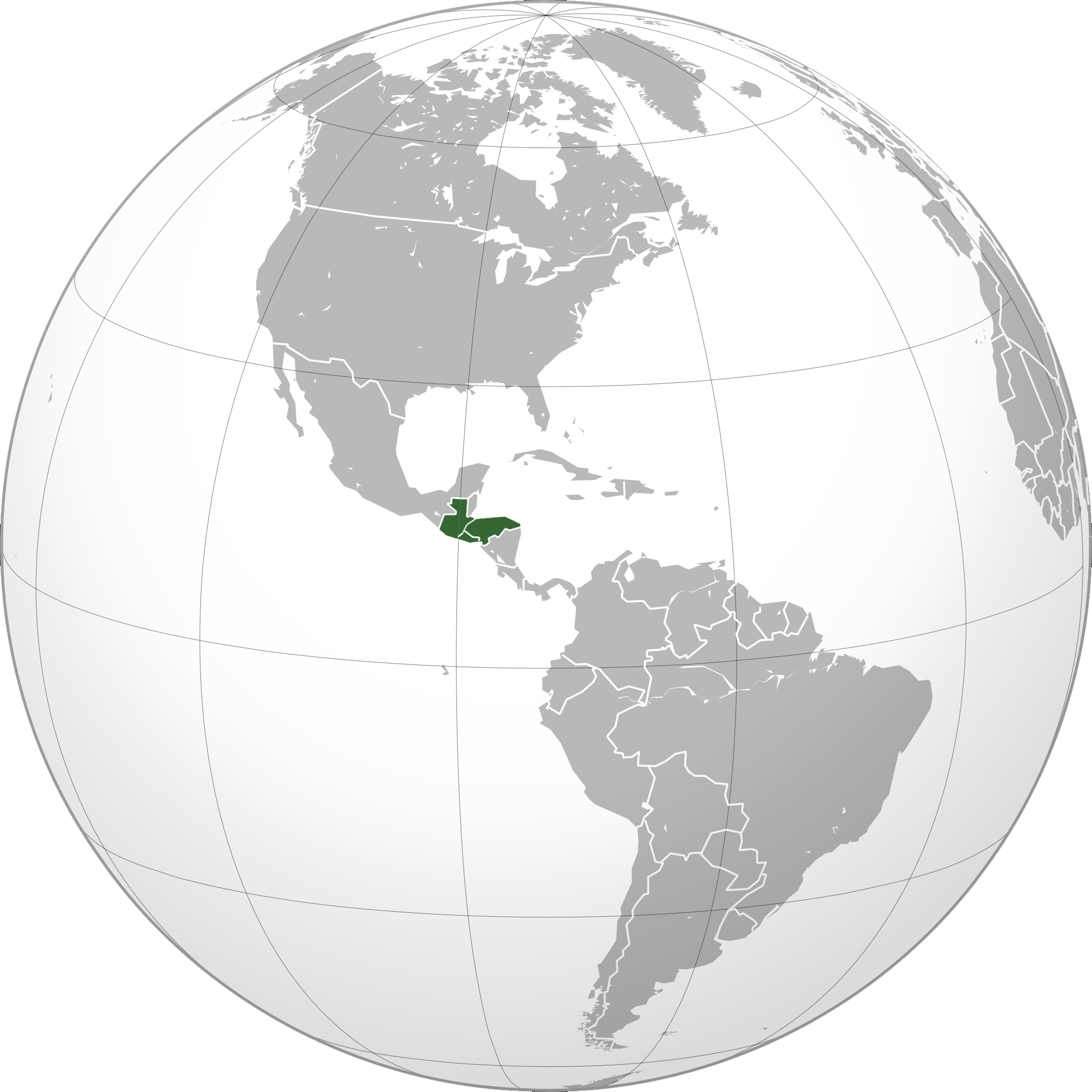
- Guatemala, Honduras, and El Salvador
- Population: ▲33,814,380 (2024 est.)
- Largest city: Tegucigalpa
- Countries: Sovereign states (3): Guatemala; El Salvador; Honduras
- Time zone: Central time

The Northern Triangle of Central America consists of three countries, Guatemala, El Salvador, and Honduras. These countries share a border tripoint at Trifinio Fraternidad Transboundary Biosphere Reserve, and also aspects of classical cultures, history, society, and politics.

The Northern Triangle of Central America (NTCA) is a term used in the United States to refer collectively to the three Central American countries of Guatemala, Honduras, and El Salvador. The term is used with respect to the countries' economic integration, and their shared challenges, including widespread poverty, violence, and corruption, which have prompted many to become refugees fleeing the three nations.

The Northern Triangle is one of the Western Hemisphere's poorest regions; as of 2018, all three countries were in the bottom 20% of Latin American nations by GDP per capita. An estimated 60% of Hondurans and Guatemalans subsist below their national poverty lines in those countries, much higher than other Latin American nations. Collectively, remittances make up nearly 18% of the Northern Triangle's economic output. The group of countries has signed trade agreements with Colombia, the United States, and Mexico. The agreement with Mexico began in 2001, later involved the Mesoamerica Project, and expanded to Costa Rica and Nicaragua in 2011.

The Northern Triangle has struggles with chronic violence, attributable to longstanding civil war and political instability in the region. During the Cold War, these three countries were the site of proxy wars and political instability, collectively known as the Central American crisis. These wars included the Guatemalan Civil War and the Salvadoran Civil War.

These countries have ongoing struggles with expansive criminal networks, such as the transnational criminal organizations, including 18th Street (M-18) and Mara Salvatrucha (MS-13). Harsh anti-crime policies (known as La Mano Dura), enacted by Northern Triangle governments starting in the early 2000s, in most cases failed to reduce crime and may have backfired by dramatically expanding prison populations, a fertile ground for gang recruitment. This region has one of the highest rates of intentional homicide for a country. According to the United Nations, in 2016 there were 27.26 homicides per 100,000 inhabitants in Guatemala, 82.84 in El Salvador, and 56.52 in Honduras. The homicide rate declined somewhat by 2019—with 22 homicides per 100,000 inhabitants in Guatemala, 32 per 100,000 inhabitants in El Salvador, and 40 per 100,000 inhabitants in Honduras—but remained markedly high.

The Northern Triangle has also experienced high rates of both emigration and migration. Research conducted by the PEW Research Center found that between the years 2007 and 2015, the number of emigrants from this region into the US has risen by 25%. According to surveys and other research conducted in this region, the majority migration and emigration levels can be attributed to the social, economic and environmental plight they face. Climate change is a major driver of emigration from the region.

== See also ==
- Central American migrant caravans
- U.S. Strategy for Engagement in Central America (2014 and after)
- Central American dry corridor
- Southern Cone
- Trifinio Fraternidad Transboundary Biosphere Reserve
- Federation of Central America (1921–1922)
