= Violence against women in Guatemala =

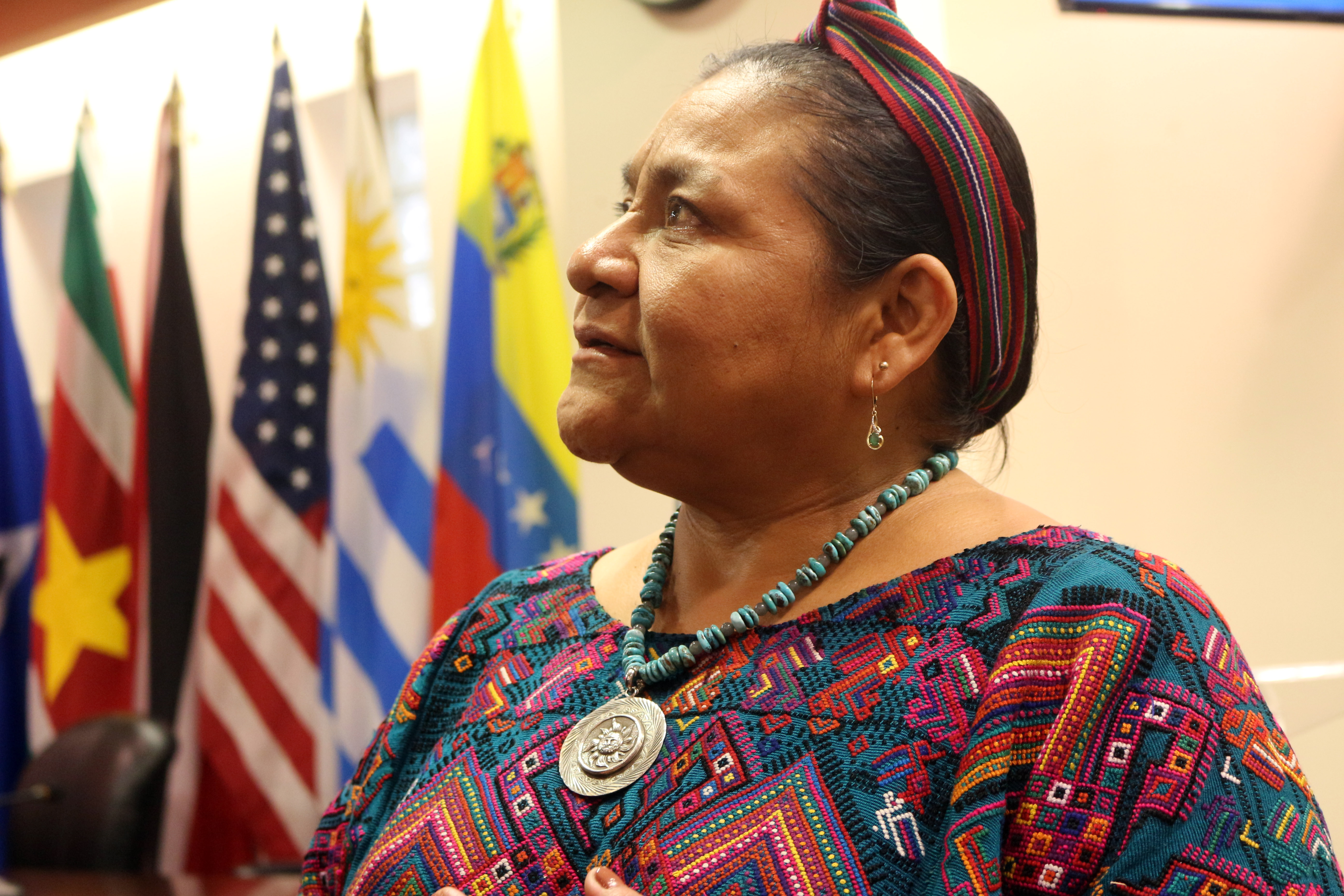
Rigoberta Menchú, a Guatemalan human rights activist, feminist, and Nobel Peace Prize laureate

Instances of gendered violence in Guatemala include domestic violence, sexual violence, human trafficking, incest, and femicide (the deliberate killing of women). Violence against women in Guatemala reached severe levels during the long-running Guatemalan Civil War (1960-1996), and the continuing impact of that conflict has contributed to the present high levels of violence against women in that nation.

== Femicide ==
Femicide is an extremely persistent problem in Guatemala. According to a 2002 report by the Small Arms Survey, Guatemala has the third highest rate of femicide in the world, behind only El Salvador and Jamaica. According to official figures, 560 women were murdered in the country in 2012, 631 women in 2011, and 695 women in 2010, though the exact number may vary.

== Attacks on Female Activists ==
Women who work as human rights defenders, including those working to protect land and natural resources, face violence in the form of threats, reprisal, and arbitrary arrests. Government authorities and security forces often commit this form of violence.

On average, female human rights defenders in Guatemala experience at least one attack each day, with an estimated eighty-three percent of these attacks being against land and natural resource defenders. Resource exploitation is linked to gender-based violence against women. As a result, indigenous women are primary victims of threats and violence. For instance, Topacio Reynoso Pacheco, a 16-year-old activist, was shot and killed by representatives of the Guatemalan government after forming a group advocating against mining within her community. This instance is just one of many in which the Guatemalan government actively works to silence and oppress female voices. In 2020, approximately 1,825 people disappeared in Guatemala, according to data collected by the National Civil Police of Guatemala (PNC). Of these 1,825 individuals, the majority (61.5%) were women. This data delineates the failures found within the nation’s effort to eradicate violence against women and gender inequality, as the numbers continue to show just how many women are continually put in these situations–whether it be through men or through their government.

== Sexual Violence ==
Sexual violence is widespread in Guatemala. There are about 10,000 cases of reported rape per year, with the total number likely being much higher because of under-reporting due to social stigma.

=== Sex Trafficking ===
Citizen and foreign women and girls have been victims of sex trafficking in Guatemala. Sex trafficking inflicts rape and physical and psychological trauma on victims in brothels, homes, and other locations. The illegal transport and sexual assault of migrants from Latin America to the United States is prevalent issue.

=== Sexual Violence Against Adolescent Girls ===
Many survivors are adolescent girls, leading to Guatemala having the highest teen pregnancy and preteen pregnancy rates in Latin America. Girls as young as 10 years old are impregnated by rape, and they usually carry these pregnancies to birth. Most (89%) instances of sexual violence are perpetrated by the girl's father or other close male relative. These men do not suffer consequences largely because of the lack of education, poverty, and lack of social respect for women. According to photo activist Linda Forsell, most young girls face expulsion from school if they are visibly pregnant.

=== Sexual Violence as a War Tactic ===
During the armed conflict, rape was used as a weapon of war.

Sexual violence is often used as a tactic in war, and many women, particularly women from indigenous tribes, often become sex slaves to soldiers and are subjected to rape and other forms of sexual violence. When a community is occupied or destroyed, an entire community of women may be subjected to rape and sexual or domestic slavery, which affects the prosperity and health of the community after a conflict’s end. During the civil war, many indigenous women were forced into sexual slavery by the military.

In February 2016, the Sepur Zarco trial convicted two ex-soldiers of crimes against humanity for their sexual abuse of 11 indigenous Q’eqchi’ women, the forced disappearance of the women's husbands, and the murder of a woman and her two daughters. Expert witnesses called by the prosecution included Brazilian feminist academic Rita Segato. The women of the Q’eqchi” community received reparations for the damage done by the convicted soldiers. The court ordered the two former military officers to pay over a million USD (£710,000) to 11 indigenous women whom they held as sex slaves during the civil war.It was the first time a case of sexual slavery during armed conflict had been considered in court. In Guatemala, it was the first time any form of sexual violence during a conflict had been settled in court.

== Militarization ==
Militarization came to Guatemala in the early 1980s. In Guatemala, as well as in other parts of Latin America, there is an intense "war on drugs", that is a conflict between state forces and drug cartels, which has taken a violent turn. As a result of the war on drugs, there is a widespread presence of the military throughout the country, with three major military bases in known drug trafficking areas. Jody Williams, a Nobel Peace Prize recipient, said, "The war on drugs and increased militarization in Mexico, Honduras and Guatemala is becoming a war on women."

The increased militarization of Guatemala has resulted in abuse and mistreatment of the people of Guatemala. Militarism spreads a perception of brutality and makes it easier to access weapons, raising the rates of domestic violence against women. Guatemala's military has a substantial history of human rights violations. Murder, torture, and missing people became a daily reality for people in Guatemala. The Nobel Women's Initiative found that communities where an army is present tend to have more violence against women. The Guatemalan military is also correlated with corruption. Recent records state that the government and military are often associated with criminal activity.

== Legislation ==
Guatemala is a country that has one of the most prevalent rates of violence against women in the world. In response to violence against women, the government has passed laws and created agencies in order to stunt the high rates of gendered violence in Guatemala in the 1990s: in 1996 it enacted Ley para prevenir, sancionar y erradicar la violencia intrafamiliar (Law on the Prevention, Punishment and Eradication of Domestic Violence). In 2008, it enacted Ley contra el Femicidio y otras Formas de Violencia Contra la Mujer (Law against Femicide and Other Forms of Violence Against Women), and in 2009 it enacted Ley contra la violencia sexual, explotación y trata de personas (Law against Sexual Violence, Exploitation and Trafficking in Persons). Despite the introduction of these laws over the past decade, data shows a continued persistence in attacks against women. Not only this, but the Guatemalan congress’s approval of Ley 5272 on International Women’s Day of 2022 can even be deemed regressive, as the policy would have illegalized abortion. Despite the law ultimately failing to be ratified, the Guatemalan government’s hand in this law could almost be seen as misogynist.

=== Procurador de los Derechos Humanos ===
In 2008, the Procurador de los Derechos Humanos (Human Rights Ombudsman) was created, which is an agency that operates with the intention of enforcing citizens' cooperation with human rights laws. Despite these efforts made by Guatemala's government, the number of women who experience gendered violence persists. The ineffectiveness of Procurador de los Derechos Humanos is a result of a multitude of factors, including the weakness of the justice system, a lack of clarity surrounding laws made regarding gendered violence, and the absence of free institutions that would aid victims. Despite the intentions of enacting Procurador de los Derechos Humanos, the full potential of its efficiency has not yet been reached.

== Marriage Laws ==
Early marriage for girls is common in Guatemala; the country has one of the highest rates of child marriage in Latin America. As of 2015, men and women must be at least 18 years of age to marry. Judges may make exceptions for girls to be married at 16. In the past, girls could be married at 14, and boys could be married at 16. The age was increased and made the same for both genders in hopes of holding both men and women to the same standard. It is estimated that 7% of girls are married before 15 years of age and 30% by 18 years of age. Rates are even higher in rural areas, where 53% of females are married before they are 18. Some reasons for early marriage are poverty, rigid gender norms, educational access, and tradition. Older men also provide more financial support to these girls. After marriage, girls are expected to start a family and face a lot of pressure to get pregnant. Teen mothers account for 25% of births in Guatemala.

== The Justice System ==
After decades of violence, dictatorship, and conflict, Guatemala's public institutions are weak, including its justice system. Lack of funding has made the law enforcement departments ineffective. As a result of how unlikely it is to be charged, criminals continue to normalize this widespread, unchecked violence. Based on the number of incidents actually reported and taken to court, only 3% result in any kind of court resolution. Authorities do not always conduct proper investigations. A small fraction of the reported crimes against women go to trial, and even fewer result in a conviction. According to Nobel Women's Initiative, in the 1980s, 200,000 people were murdered, and 1,000s of women were raped. Many cases similar to these have not gone to trial. Of the complaints about violence against women that were registered in 2010 by the Judicial Department, only 1% resulted in sentencing.

Murders are often not properly investigated and rarely result in any conviction; less than 4 percent of all homicide cases result in conviction for the perpetrators. Because of the lack of repercussions and the "machismo" culture in Latin America, perpetrators are confident they will get away with murder. This machismo culture allows women to be treated as disposable, and the rights granted to men, such as a due process in investigations, are not rarely considered for women. Rape culture and victim blaming are the tactics that go along with machismo, causing both men and women to largely agree with the misogynistic worldview.

Law enforcement often fails to investigate in a timely manner and tend to blame the victims of the case. Many women abandon their cases because the stress and hardship put onto them in facing an oppressive court. Without proper trials, investigations, and sentencing, the violence towards women will progressively increase.

Women are often murdered or subjected to violence by family members such as fathers, brothers, stepfathers, and husbands, but when they try to report a crime that was done by family members, the women themselves are often treated with contempt for complaining. Discrimination in the justice system is one of the many problems women face in Guatemala. The justice system discriminates according to race, class, sex, and ethnicity. Discrimination is worst for women who are poor, migrant, young, and lesbian.

There is a lack of female representation in the political system, which may contribute to the lack of progressive change. As of 2015, only 13.9% of members of Parliament were women.

From 2006 to 2011, the allotted military budget went from 63 million USD to 175 million USD. Otto Pérez Molina became the first military official to be elected as president. Shortly after being elected president in 2012, Pérez increased the role of the military in fighting crime. Soldiers are now assigned public safety duties that would normally be reserved for police forces. As of 2013, there were twenty-one thousand troops deployed to assist in public safety duties.Amerindian (indigenous) women in Guatemala face high levels of violence at the hands of the military and state authorities. It is very difficult for indigenous women to obtain justice. Many of them have not received a school education and live in extreme poverty. Many girls in indigenous communities do not attend school because of the distance from their homes to school. The indigenous population in 2012 was estimated at 39.8% of Guatemala's population. High illiteracy rates and the fact that they do not speak Spanish limits their ability to utilize the justice system. The justice system is limited for people who do not speak Spanish. This means that many women must be educated in a foreign language to protect their rights. The 2008 law against femicide and other forms of violence against women has enforced people to treat women equally. The 2008 law addressed the private and public crimes in Guatemala. Women in Guatemala are often uninformed of their rights and do not have the courage to report the crimes committed against them.

== Health Care ==
According to Doctors without Borders, "Survivors [of sexual violence] are stigmatized, and they cannot easily find treatment in Guatemala yet. There are no resources and too little comprehension of patients’ needs by the doctors."

The nation's health care institutions are ill-equipped and unwilling to provide adequate care for the thousands of women victimized by sexual violence each year. "Complications in pregnancy and childbirth are the second highest cause of death for 15- to 19-year-old girls globally".

Victims of sexual assault in Guatemala often suffer from HIV/AIDS, unwanted pregnancy, Hepatitis B, syphilis, Chlamydia, and Gonorrhoea. Because health care is not readily accessible and education about sexual violence is not prevalent, avoidable and treatable health problems often go untreated. The emotional and psychological impact of sexual violence often requires professional health care to treat, but the stigma surrounding sexual violence makes it difficult for victims to get help.

International organizations like Doctors Without Borders try to fill the gap in Guatemala's health care and provide assistance to victims of sexual violence. In 2007, Doctors Without Borders opened a clinic in Guatemala City that provides comprehensive care for such victims. The organization is also implementing educational programs in Guatemala City that aim to end the prevalence of sexual violence there.

== Advocacy ==
More recently, social groups advocating for gender equality in Guatemala helped reform the age at which a girl is able to legally be married. The Angélica Fuentes Foundation and Girl Up (a United Nations youth foundation) together put forth an initiative to change the legal age of marriage in Guatemala from 14 to 18. These advocates had integral roles in the passing of the legislation in January 2016. The leaders of both The Angélica Fuentes Foundation and Girl Up stated that their main goal of pushing for a higher marriage age was to aid the children in Guatemala. Young girls often would be forced to give up their education and be constricted to a life devoted to marriage, however with the marriage age raised young women would be free to pursue other interests. The leader of The Angélica Fuentes Foundation states that it is her hope that this initiative promotes gender equality and an increase in opportunity for young girls in Guatemala, as well as in other Latin American countries.

The Center for Gender and Refugee Studies investigates and reports on sexual violence in Guatemala, working with human rights advocates, government groups, and community groups based in Guatemala. They have raised awareness by publishing papers on the ineffectiveness of Guatemala's Law Against Femicide and Other Forms of Violence Against Women, which was passed in 2008. In addition, they educate countries around the world about the prevalence of sexual violence in Guatemala, so that international pressure can be put on the country to prevent sexual violence against women. They provide resources for attorneys representing female victims of sexual violence and help advocates in Guatemala implement laws that prevent sexual violence.

== Mob violence ==
Guatemala is ranked the 25th most violent country in the world, and Guatemalan police have a reputation for being non-responsive to the high crime rates. The lack of security within the government encouraged the start of mobs turning to vigilante justice. The mobs instigate additional crime in their attempt to prevent and punish other crimes. Most of the locals keep quiet for fear of being targeted by these mob groups, and many of the people participating in the violence are forced to do so.

Guatemalans often enforce informal 'justice' by subjecting individuals to violence and even murdering those whom they believe have violated moral standards. For example, in 2015, a 16-year-old girl was lynched and burned alive by a mob after reportedly being accused of being part of a group that killed a taxi driver.

According to data from the National Civil Police of Guatemala, at least 84 people were killed by lynching in Guatemala between January 2012 and May 2015. The lynchings primarily took place in the departments of Huehuetenango, Guatemala, and Alta Verapaz. Men accounted for seventy-six of the lynching deaths, while women accounted for eight.

== See also ==
- Femicide in Latin America
