= Women in the Mexican drug war =

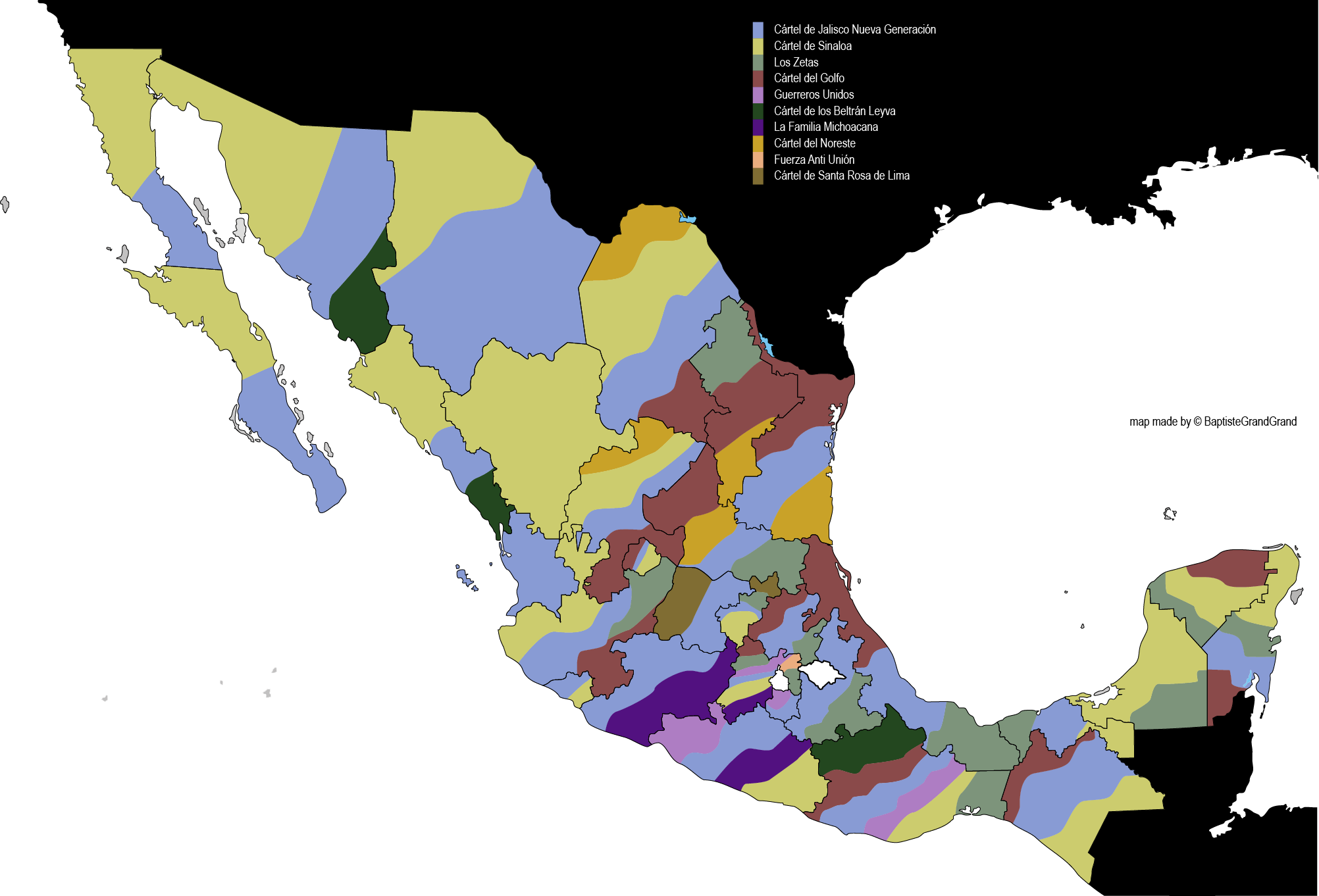
Mexican criminal organizations presence in 2020, according to the Mexican Secretariat of Finance and Public Credit

Since the beginning of the Mexican drug war in 2006, many women, of Mexican and other nationalities, have been victims of extortion, rape, torture, and murder, as well as forced disappearance, by belligerents on all sides. Women have been sex trafficked in Mexico by the cartels and gangs. The criminal organizations, in turn, use the profits to buy weapons and expand. They have harmed and carried out sexual assault of migrants from Latin America to the United States. The violence against women in the drug war has spread beyond Mexico to bordering and nearby countries in Central America and North America. The number of women killed in the conflict is unknown because of the lack of data. Women officials, judges, lawyers, paralegals, reporters, business owners, social media influencers, teachers, and non-governmental organizations directors have also been involved in the conflict in different capacities. There have been female combatants in the military, police, cartels, and gangs. Women have lost loved ones in the conflict.

== Victimization of women ==
Civilian women, as well as young women and girls, in Mexico have been physically and psychologically harmed in the conflict. A number have had little protection because of corruption, impunity, and apathy. Businesswomen and female farmers and laborers are threatened and coerced to pay taxes to drug gangs. Other women are forced to cultivate or pack drugs. Women have been forced to be mules. They have been killed in the crossfire of gun fights and assassinations. Some women have been killed for refusing the romantic advances of men, witnessing crimes, being informants, activists against crime, and other reasons. Women have also been murdered for being the grandmothers, mothers, wives, daughters, nieces, sisters, aunts, cousins, coworkers, or friends of persons targeted for assassination. Women have been bound and tortured. Women's corpses have been decapitated and mutilated in other ways. Female bodies have been disemboweled and hung from bridges. The bodies and body parts of women have been displayed in other ways, including being dumped on and along highways. The perpetrators sometimes leave written signs with threats and why they murdered the victims.

Women have been raped, tortured, and murdered by Mexican military forces and police.

Sexual assault of migrants from Latin America to the United States, many who are escaping the drug war violence, is pervasive.

=== Government employees, politicians, lawyers ===
Female officials and their family members have been murdered in the drug war. Female police and military officers, as well as federal agents and their family members have been murdered because of their occupation and or anti-cartel efforts. Female lawyers have been killed too.

=== Journalists and media workers ===
Female reporters and their family members have been murdered in the drug war for writing anti-cartel articles for newspapers or posting messages on the internet.

The girlfriends, wives, and daughters of male journalists and media workers have been murdered.

=== Sex trafficking and rape ===
Sex trafficking in Mexico is a significant problem. Cartels and gangs fighting in the Mexican drug war have sex trafficked women and girls in order to obtain additional profits. The cartels and gangs also abduct women to use as their personal sex slaves and force them into unfree labour. The sexual assault of migrants from Latin America to the United States by members of these criminal organizations is a problem.

=== Number of casualties ===
The number of women killed in the conflict cannot be known because the absence of data from corruption, cover-ups, bad record keeping, and failures in interagency communication. A number of cases involving murders and disappearances have gone uninvestigated or unsolved because the authorities feared being harmed by cartel or gang members. Some corrupt or coerced authorities have tampered with evidence and documents to conceal information. A great number of bodies of victims have not been found. The criminals have been known to use acids and corrosive liquids, fire, and other methods to dispose of remains and make identification difficult to impossible. Criminals have stolen bodies from crime scenes and morgues. Data has been manipulated. Government workers have intentionally underreported violent crimes.

== Women as participants ==
Women have participated in the Mexican drug war. They have served for all belligerents. Women have been members of cartels and gangs. There have been female assassins and drug money launderers. Others have obstructed justice on behalf of the cartels. They have transacted with drug trafficking entities and individuals in other ways. Women have fought against the cartels and gangs as police, military, lawyers, paralegals, prosecutors, activists, and more.

Drug Trafficking Organizations (DTOs) will assign women to high-risk assignments, but the required skills to succeed are much lower. These women are often not crucial members of the DTO. If they are captured and try to make a deal with authorities by informing the organization of a lesser sentence, giving out valuable information would be nearly impossible. Women are being incarcerated at a greater rate than men for drug offenses in Latin American countries.

Women's involvement in the cartel is noticeably less than males, but they do play an important role nonetheless. Often, because no one would suspect a woman to commit such a serious crime, it makes them the perfect smuggler. Women smugglers can drive up to a checkpoint with a car full of drugs, and more often than not, no one would suspect them of anything. Women may find allure in a criminal lifestyle for a sense of freedom. Mexico already has a male-dominated culture, but by working in the drug trade, they can be empowered and even liberated. If women cannot obtain freedom through legal means, then they may use illegal avenues to achieve the same goal.

Women with higher involvement in DTOs often work with their male partners. In the early 1970s, Helen Hernandez worked with her husband, Roberto Hernandez, his brother Juan, and Mercedes Coleman, who owned the home where they operated. They managed a well-organized operation based in Tijuana. It would take US and Mexican agents working together to bring the drug operation down. After a raid conducted by a joint team of US and Mexican agents, they would discover fifteen pounds of cocaine, $25,000 in cash, small arms, and a rocket launcher. Two women and six other men were also arrested. They worked as drug couriers who would smuggle the drugs across the border into San Diego. The drugs were smuggled in by the women couriers who hid the drugs within Mexican Folk art. Even after their arrests, the newly formed Drug Enforcement Agency (DEA) discovered they were operating their drug empire behind bars.

Maria Guadalupe Lopez Esquivel, better known as La Catrina, would not become another woman taken by violence during the Mexican drug war. Maria Guadalupe Lopez Esquivel would earn her alias for the death that she could inflict on the enemies of the Jalisco New Generation Cartel (CJNG). La Catrina is the female skeleton that has become iconic to Dia de los Muertos (Day of the Dead). La Catrina grew up impoverished in Tepalcatepec, Mexico, and had to make a life for herself. She would make this life by becoming a Sicaria (female hitman) for the CJNG. La Catrina would not take long to prove her value to her cartel. La Catrina planned and executed an ambush on Mexican Law enforcement in October of 2019. Fourteen police officers would lose their lives. Not even a month later, she would help coordinate another attack that would ultimately kill a total of forty state police officers. CJNG would award La Catrina for her service and dedication by becoming a Plaza Boss. Plaza Bosses can create their own death squads, plan out assassinations, and sell drugs to other plazas. La Catrina took pride in her work and only sought the best results. La Catrina was killed in January 2020 during a police shootout. State police had surrounded her plaza, making sure she had no method of escape. La Catrina is no longer alive, but her memory lives on the CNJG and continues to celebrate Sicaria’s violent life. Strangely, La Catrina has inspired many women, and maybe, like La Catrina, they can become a legend in a culture that prefers to celebrate men and ignores the success of women.

Women can take an essential role in DTOs. Emma Coronel Aispuro is married to Joaquín "El Chapo" Guzmán. Coronel comes from an affluent family within the Sinaloa Cartel. Her father, Ines Coronel, and uncle, Nacho Coronel, worked their way up to the higher ranks within the cartel. Ines Coronel would arrange a marital union with Joaquín Guzmán while his daughter was seventeen. However, being only a wife to the notorious “El Chapo” was not for her. The DEA would confirm through their undercover agents within the Sinaloa Cartel that Emma Coronel was giving orders after her husband had been arrested and held within Altiplano Prison.
