= 2015 Rio Bravo lynching =

Guatemalan vigilante murder and viral video

May 2015 Rio Bravo lynching
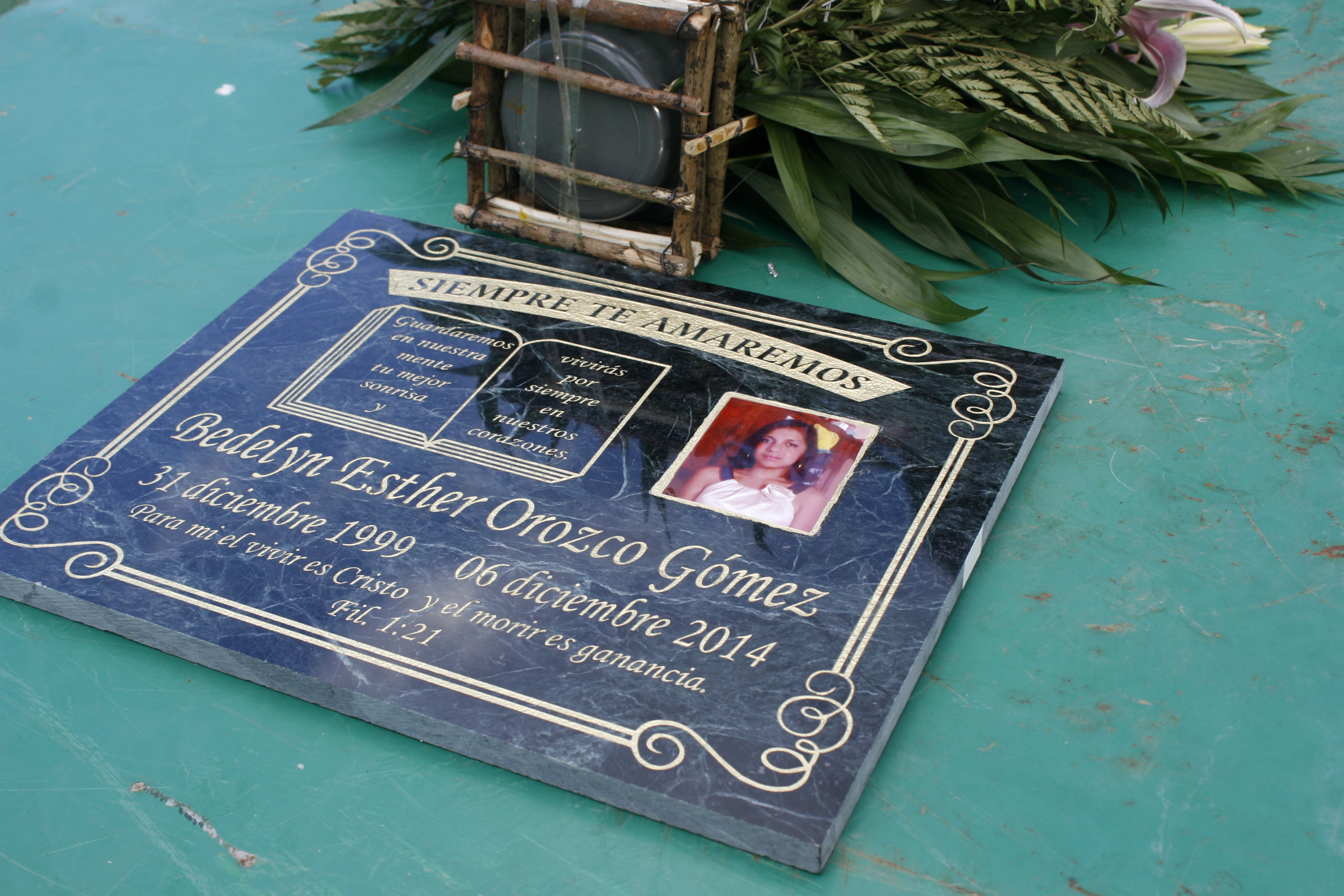
- The grave of Bedelyn Esther Orozco Gomez, the girl lynched
- Date: May 2015
- Location: Río Bravo, Suchitepéquez, Guatemala
- Accused: Gregorio Gutiérrez Lima
- Charges: Homicide

Fourteen-year-old girl Bedelyn Esther Orozco Gómez was burned to death in Río Bravo, Suchitepéquez, Guatemala, in May 2015 by a vigilante mob after being accused by some of involvement in the killing of a moto taxi driver. A video of the lynching was later uploaded to YouTube and widely circulated on Guatemalan social media.

== Lynching ==
The lynching took place on 10 May 2015 in the Guatemalan village of Río Bravo. According to local media, Orozco Gómez had been accused of being involved in the murder of Carlos Enrique González Noriega, a 68-year-old moto taxi driver. Residents claimed Orozco Gómez, along with two other men, shot González Noriega after he had refused to pay protection money. The two male accomplices escaped, but Orozco was captured by a mob and dragged to the town center.

A crowd of at least one hundred people—including women and children—watched as Orozco Gómez was repeatedly punched and kicked by vigilantes. Police attempted to intervene, but were blocked from the area by the mob, and fled the scene instead. After being severely beaten, a member of the crowd doused Orozco Gómez in gasoline and burned her to death.

== Viral video ==
Seven days after the lynching, a video of the attack surfaced online. The video was uploaded to YouTube, where it received thousands of views before being removed. The video was also widely shared on Guatemalan social media networks, where it prompted debate on vigilante justice.

=== Fake news usage ===
In October 2023, the video resurfaced on social media with false claims, this time suggesting it depicted the killing of an Israeli girl by a "Palestinian lynch mob". Following the Fall of Kabul in 2021, the video had been previously circulated on social media, falsely portraying it as an incident involving an Afghan girl. The initial false claims emerged in 2018, suggesting the victim, Orozco Gómez, was a Hindu from Madhya Pradesh, India, who was burned alive for attending a Christian church service.

== See also ==
- Crime and violence in Latin America
- Crime in Guatemala
- Extrajudicial punishment
