= Crime in Guatemala =

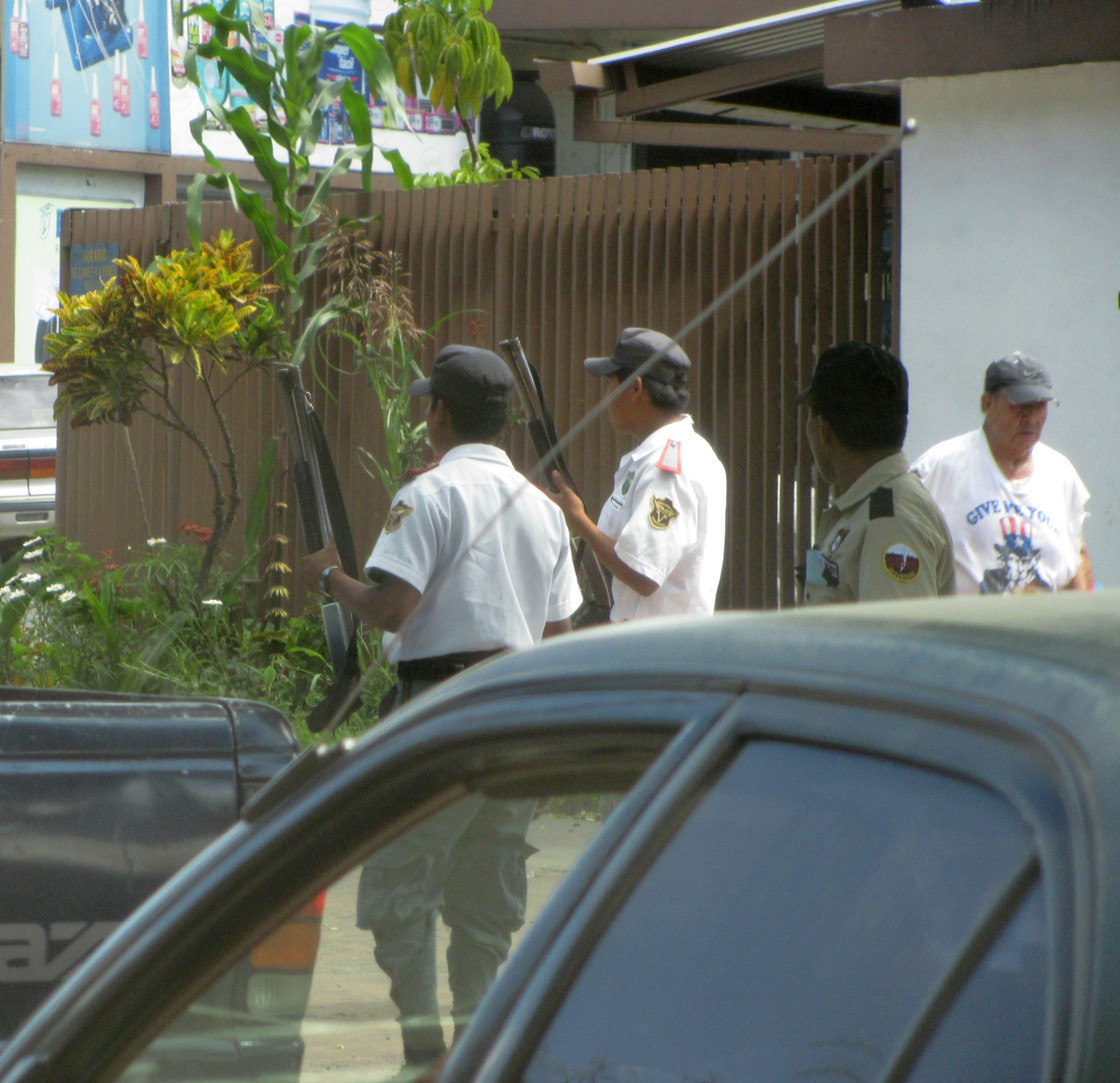
Security guards with shotguns in Guatemala City

Guatemala has one of the highest violent crime and homicide rates in Latin America. In the 1990s, four Guatemalan cities were featured in Latin America's top ten cities by murder rate: Escuintla (165 per 100,000), Izabal (127), Santa Rosa Cuilapa (111), and Guatemala City (101). According to The New Yorker, in 2009, "fewer civilians were reported killed in the war zone of Iraq than were shot, stabbed, or beaten to death in Guatemala", and 97% of homicides "remain unsolved". Much of the violent nature of Guatemalan society stems back to a 36-year-long civil war; however, not only has violence maintained its presence in the post-war context following the Guatemalan Civil War, but it has extended to broader social and economic forms of violence. Prison overcrowding is also a major concern, and it has been linked to extortion and gang activity.

== Effects of the Guatemalan Civil War ==
The Guatemalan Civil War began in 1960 between the government and leftist actors, and it resulted in over 200,000 deaths. Sources cite the history of conflict in Guatemala as rendering communities accustomed to violence today, and the extension of incompetent or corrupt state institutions facilitates the impunity associated with such violence. During the civil war, the country witnessed a “generalized fear shaped by state terror and institutional violence.”

=== Violence against indigenous peoples ===
Most civil war victims were Maya whose deaths were not reported to Ladino audiences via newspapers. Many of these deaths came in brutal fashions like rapes, forced abortions, and burnings. Sexual violence was strategically employed by state officials as a genocidal weapon against indigenous women. The distrust of indigenous still permeates Guatemalan culture today.

=== Violence against students ===
The fear of students by government takes much history into account. It was students who led the revolution in 1944 that instituted the only ten years of democracy in the twentieth century that Guatemala experienced. One school, the Universidad de San Carlos de Guatemala, the state viewed with particular distrust during the civil war, because the revolutionary government during democratic period of 1944-1954 had reserved it complete autonomy. After the 1954 Guatemalan coup d'état, a majority of the 8,000 San Carlos students possessed leftist views in line with the outgoing government. Therefore, throughout the subsequent civil war, the state placed an emphasis on repressing, often disappearing, students of San Carlos.

== Trafficking ==
The high rate of murder has been blamed on "a highly powerful criminal cartel", made up of politically connected retired military officers and linking with drug traffickers and other criminals. Following the end of Guatemalan Civil War in 1996, a general amnesty was granted "for even the worst crimes, leaving no one accountable".

The Guatemalan "security apparatus — death squads, intelligence units, police officers, military counter-insurgency forces — did not disappear but, rather, mutated into criminal organizations," and now are engaged "in arms trafficking, money laundering, extortion, human smuggling, black-market adoptions, and kidnapping for ransom," and drug trade.

Some high-profile murders revealed or suspected to be the work of the cartel include that of Catholic Bishop Juan José Gerardi Conedera, beaten to death in 1998, two days after the conclusion of an inquiry he had led into the violence of the civil war. The inquiry had blamed the Guatemalan army for 90% of the war's 200,000 killings. Gerardi also found links between the military and the illegal drug trade in Guatemala, providing an additional motivation. In 1997 a large group of active military figures, including the deputy Minister of Defense, were found to be involved with the Colombian Cali cartel's smuggling efforts.

Khalil Musa, a wealthy Lebanese immigrant businessman, and his daughter Marjorie Musa, were shot and killed in April 2009. Khalil Musa reportedly knew president Álvaro Colom, an advisor of whom told an American journalist that, “if the Musas could be killed, there was a sense that anyone [in Guatemala] could be.”

=== Drug trafficking ===
Guatemala finds itself located in the middle of the drug supply from South America and drug demand in the United States. Guatemala links Honduras and Mexico along common drug routes between Central America and the United States. Its long, un-patrolled coastline and sparse jungles make it a popular landing point for boats and planes carrying drugs from South America, while its borders are understaffed and ill-equipped to fully exert customs controls.

Greater regional efforts to crack down on narcotics trade has merely diverted the transport routes and methods used. According to the International Crisis Group, Guatemala had been “a primary landing zone for narcotics-laden flights” until U.S.-supported interdiction efforts disrupted illegal flight shipments and forced traffickers to use land routes instead. From 2006, Mexico's crackdown on drug trafficking pushed cartel operations to import cocaine through Central America instead, and a majority of cocaine departing South America now travels through the northern regions of Central America to reach U.S. markets.

The lack of effective law enforcement following the 2009 coup also contributed to the growth of narcotics smuggling. The post-coup regime kept a majority of Guatemalan security forces in the capital, leaving regional law enforcement under-supported. Wealthy traffickers often assume the role of de facto authorities in such areas.

=== Human trafficking ===
Like other Central American countries, the closeness of Guatemala to the United States provides a natural route for human trafficking as well as arms trafficking. Citizen and foreign women and children are particularly vulnerable to sex trafficking in Guatemala, while all ages and sexes suffer from systems of forced labor in the country. Frequently, human trafficking cases are linked to transnational criminal organizations, such as trafficked children used by gangs to commit illegal activities.

== Corruption ==
According to Human Rights Watch, Guatemala has "weak and corrupt law enforcement institutions". Officials and police have been complicit in human trafficking in Guatemala.

== Impersonation of police officers ==
There are reports that people, especially tourists, are victimized by criminals who are dressed in police uniforms, and who commit theft, extortion or sexual assaults.

== Violence ==
=== Murders ===
Homicide rate in Guatemala (1995–2014)

Murders are a serious problem in Guatemala: the country has one of the highest murder rates in the world, with less than 4% of murders being solved. Amnesty International stated in 2007 that there is a "culture of impunity" with regard to homicide. In 2013, there were over 6,000 violent deaths; most of these are related to local criminal gangs. According to the US Department of State, Guatemala's high murder rate is caused by four principal factors: an increase in drug trafficking; a growing prevalence of gang-related violence; a heavily armed civilian population; and a weak and incompetent police/judicial system. In September 2019, the government announced a state of siege in five northeastern provinces after three police officers were killed by drug traffickers.

=== Sexual violence ===
Sexual crimes, including sex exploitation of minors, are common in Guatemala. Foreigners from the US, Canada and Europe also participate in commercial sexual exploitation of children in Guatemala.

After having received criticism for lack of adequate legislation on sexual violence, Guatemala enacted in 2009 Ley contra la violencia sexual, explotación y trata de personas (Law against Sexual Violence, Exploitation and Trafficking in Persons). However, sexual crimes against children continue; the former UN Special Rapporteur on the sale of children, child prostitution and child pornography, Najat Maalla M’jid, stated in 2012 that "Many children are still victims of sexual exploitation and forced labour in Guatemala despite the laudable efforts carried out to prevent and combat the sale of children for illegal adoption."

There are about 10,000 cases of reported rape per year, but the total number is likely much higher because of under-reporting due to social stigma. According to Doctors without Borders, "Survivors [of sexual violence] are stigmatized and they cannot easily find treatment in Guatemala yet. There are no resources and too little comprehension of patients’ needs by the doctors."

=== Violence against women ===
Today, femicide is quite common in Guatemala. Women are killed at rates today in Guatemala comparable to that of the peak violent period of the civil war. From 2000 to 2010, the country saw over five thousand murders of women and girls. Femicide to an extent is a function of a historical gendered violence that the state and society permitted legally and socially throughout the 20th century. Most femicides go unsolved, showing the continuation of civil war societal features like impunity and the normalization of violence against women. Common crime violence has exacerbated the situation for women, creating a dual upsurge in both of gender-based violence and femicide in Guatemala. According to the UN, two women are murdered on average each day in Guatemala. As shown by high rates of domestic abuse, females also face more vulnerabilities of private violence while young males are threatened more by public gang violence. In just the first month of 2005, Guatemala City alone received 13,700 reports of family violence. Furthermore, many women Guatemalan immigrants to the U.S. will still face threatening situations if they are deported to their home country.

=== Street gangs ===
Young males ages 15 to 24 characterize the typical perpetrators of street crime, which is often committed against individuals of the same age group. Like most post-war societies, Guatemala has a very young population and a higher propensity for youth violence. Post-war transitions to peacetime jobs are often difficult due to a lack of funding for public education, and in Guatemala this problem was made worse because during its civil war not only were funds for public education reallocated to military expenditures, but military forces deliberately targeted schools and students. The two most prominent youth street gangs in Guatemala and other Central American countries are the Mara Salvatrucha and the 18th Street gang, but there are many other gangs: in 1997 the Prensa Libre reported that 53 gangs were known to be active in the capital city, Guatemala City, alone. Such gangs began to proliferate in the mid-1990s after large numbers of undocumented Central American immigrants were deported from Los Angeles, particularly to El Salvador. In 2011, UNODC reported that Guatemala had 32,000 gang members—-more than in any other Central America country.

The economic struggles of the country fuel participation in street violence as well. UN studies have reported that in Guatemala and the other northern nations of Central America, "stark wealth disparities provide criminals with both a justification and an opportunity for their activities." In addition to poverty, youth in Guatemala are compelled to join gangs by fierce peer pressure, by the desire for support of those with broken families, and by the allure of an outlaw lifestyle. The cultural difference between gangs and the rest of society and the overall intimidation of the gang image gives individual gang members considerable power and increased social capital. Guatemalan society has come to see violence as normal and as inevitably linked with youth, which may prolong the passivity towards violence by leaving young people with an approach that embodies an acceptance of short-term lives. With youth largely correlated with public violence, trust and communication among community members and young people suffers. Therefore, communities leave youth socially excluded, and gangs may seemingly offer inclusion. Members of street gangs still do not constitute organized crime, but the mass incarcerations of youth gang members in Guatemala puts them in direct contact with leaders of organized crime networks who direct from prison, who assist street gangs organize and institutionalize themselves.

=== Mob violence ===
Lynchings and other acts of vigilante justice are widespread throughout Guatemala, particularly in rural regions. According to the Prosecutor's Office, there were an average of 30 attempted lynchings per month in 2014. The National Civil Police of Guatemala reported that 84 people were killed by lynching between January 2012 and May 2015, with most deaths occurring in the departments of Huehuetenango, Guatemala and Alta Verapaz. The victims of lynchings are primarily males.

According to human rights activists, vigilante justice has become widespread due to the public's lack of confidence in police and the justice system. Although the exact motive behind each lynching is not always known, victims are often accused of committing extortion by demanding the payment of protection money – a crime which is rarely prosecuted successfully in the country. Other lynching victims have been accused of practicing witchcraft or committing robbery. Participants in acts of mob violence are seldom prosecuted.

In May 2015, a video was released online of the lynching of a sixteen-year-old girl in the village of Río Bravo. The video shows a crowd of over a hundred people—including women and children—watching as the girl is punched and kicked by vigilantes. A member of the crowd then douses the girl in gasoline and burns her alive. The girl had been accused of being part of a group that murdered a 68-year-old moto taxi driver. The video was widely shared on YouTube and Guatemalan social media networks, where it sparked outcry against such acts of vigilante justice.

== Migration ==
While youth in Guatemala represent key actors of increasing violence in the country, they also remain among the most affected by the consequences of a violent society. Children commonly migrate to the United States, often to reunite with family, and to flee conditions related to crime like societal violence, abuse in the home, and social exclusion. The year of 2014 saw a surge in numbers of unaccompanied children migrants from Central America, predicted to reach 70,000 and resulting in the 2014 American immigration crisis. In a UN study on the roots of children migration from Guatemala, El Salvador, and Honduras, forty-eight percent of children interviewed recounted personal experiences of increased organized violence. Violent actors included drug cartels, gangs, and State sponsored actors. Additionally, twenty-three percent of the Guatemalan children interviewed noted that they had survived domestic violence by their parents or guardians.

== See also ==
- Illegal drug trade in Guatemala
- Northern Triangle of Central America
