= Youth in Guatemala =

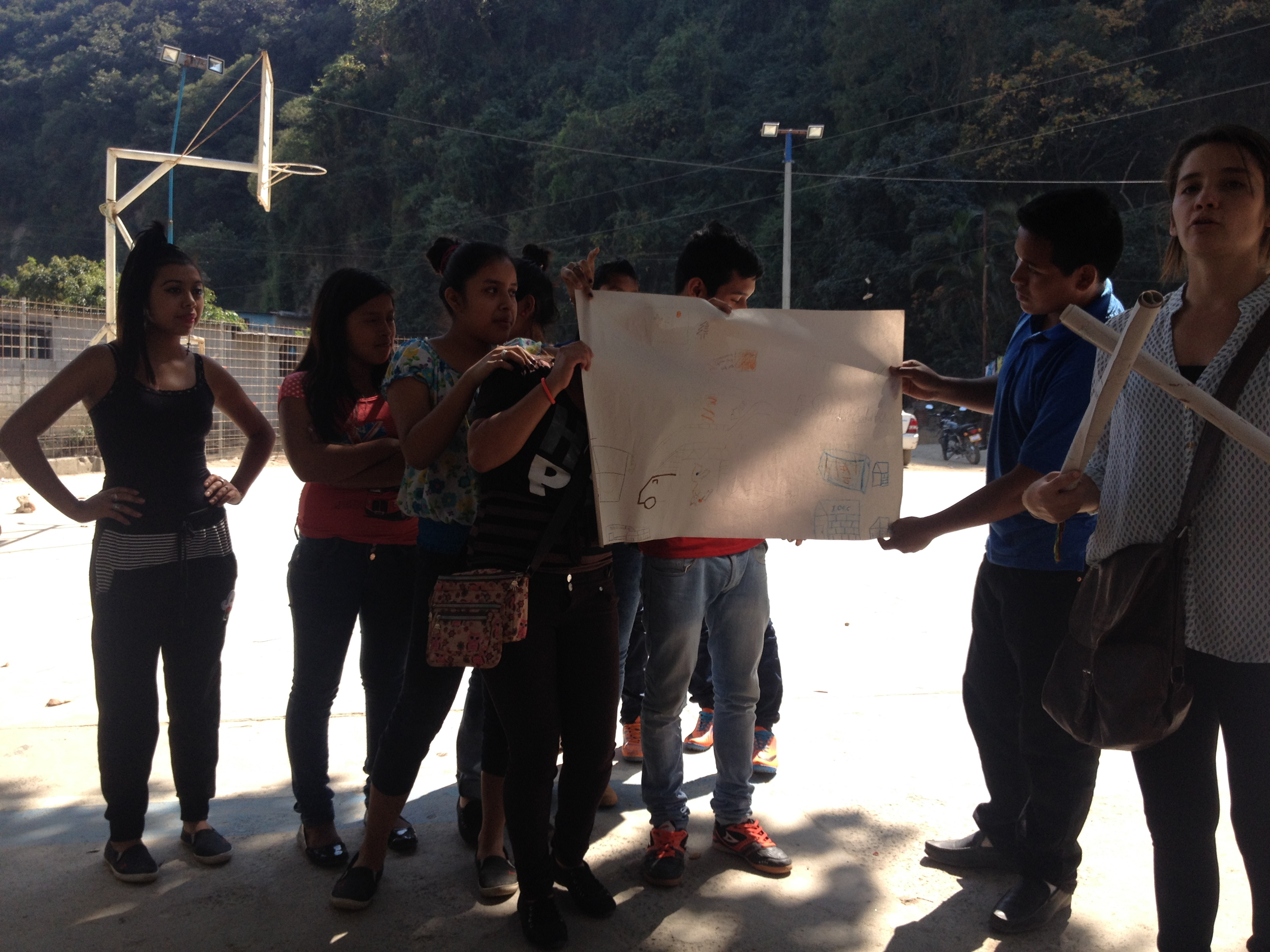
Guatemalan high school students in Villa Nueva

Youth in Guatemala are the largest segment of the nation's population. Youth includes individuals between the ages of 15 and 24. Over half of the population is under 19 years old in 2011, the highest proportion of young people of any country in Latin America. The health, education, and work opportunities for young people differ by ethnicity (ladino or indigenous) and social class.

Male literacy rate is 89.3% and the female literacy rate is 85.6%. Secondary education participation is around 17%. 30.3% of youth are married by the age of 18.

Poverty and inequality affect a youth's access to healthcare. Females experience less access to health care and education than males. The lack of adequate nutrition and health care in Guatemala has adverse effects on a youth's overall health. One example being stunted growth of half of the Guatemalan youth. The Millennium Development Goals works to these inequalities and barriers.

Vulnerable youths who are at-risk for joining a gang are males between the ages of living in marginalized urban areas and have limited access to education. A program called Open Schools combats forces that push youth into dangerous situations and works to overcome barriers that Guatemalan youth face.

== Education ==
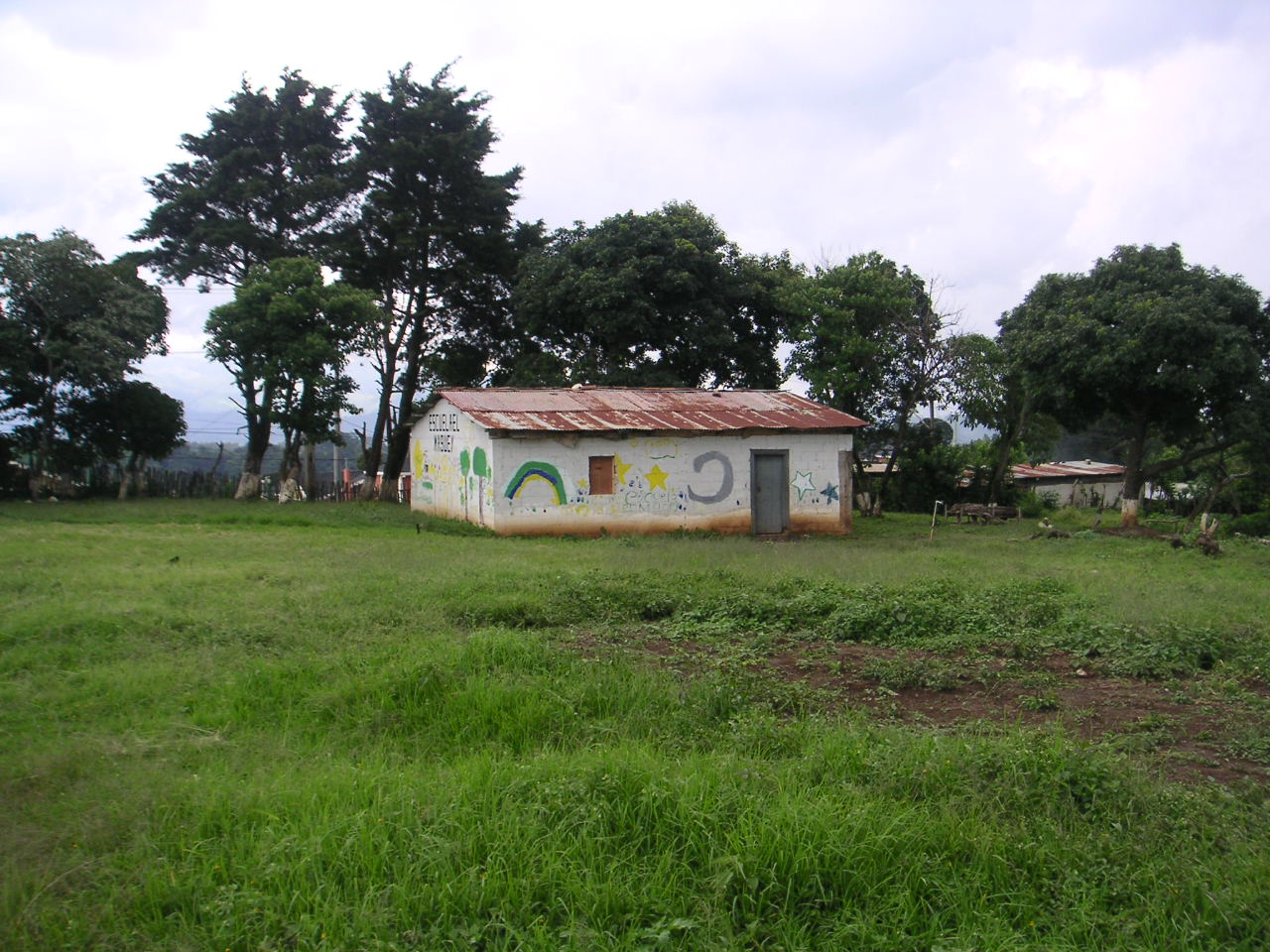
Community village school

Education in Guatemala has less than full participation. Primary schools do not achieve 100% enrollment and from there, enrollment drops until it reaches about 17% at the high school level. Females are less represented, with 44.3% net enrollment ratio, compared to males at 48%. This contributes to a higher participation in the informal market.

Guatemala's public university is USAC, Universidad de San Carlos de Guatemala. "From every 100 graduate students enrolled in San Carlos of Guatemala University only 13 successfully completed their programs". Youth who successfully complete secondary education typically obtain a degree in the social sciences, with 1334 social science master's degrees granted of the 2093 total degrees. The medical field, as well as Science, Technology, Engineering, and Mathematics fields, should be a top priority but are not a focus of higher education. Social connections and ties, as well as nepotism, are viewed as more important than Education.

Teachers in Guatemala often encounter youth who were left behind by their parents who migrated elsewhere. They often dissuaded their students from migrating due to loss of human capital experienced during migration.

Open Schools, a program launched in 2008, helps prevent violence and protect youth by providing them opportunity to constructively use their free time. Open Schools is not a formal educational environment but it aims to help youth who are disadvantaged through culture, art, sports, and technology. Open Schools program is available to students on the weekends where youth can socialize and participate in constructive activities. Child Aid is another program that helps a youth's educational experience by increasing literacy.

== Employment ==
140,000 Guatemalan youth enter the labor market each year. About 25,000 of those youth gain access to formal employment. Formal employment is often classified as training for the job and social security. It is estimated that jobs in the informal market have reached about 5.1 million. Youth who obtain a degree are not properly utilized in the formal job market, as they are outcompeted by their foreign counterparts. Work after graduation is limited because it is assumed that youth who hold degrees would not be willing to work low paying jobs.

Within the public sector, youth are discouraged from participation in the workforce because of poor salaries and disincentives. Youth often enter into the informal job market at a young age, sometimes dropping out of school to support themselves or their families. Informal jobs provide youth with income but are untaxed and unmonitored by the state, examples being farmers or domestic workers. These jobs do not provide youth or other individuals with government protections, like insurance. PILAR, a program which stands for Promoting Informal Labor Rights, works to provide more protection for those in the informal sector.

Open Schools provides leadership training and job training to both youth and adults to help ensure steady income and employment.

The Millennium Development Goals, or MDG's, targets causes of poverty such as gender inequality, education, and environmental stability. "Education and training in business administration and large-scale marketing operations are essential for the youth to join the economic life of the country". MDG's purpose is to prevent youth from entering into poverty by providing educational and economic stability.

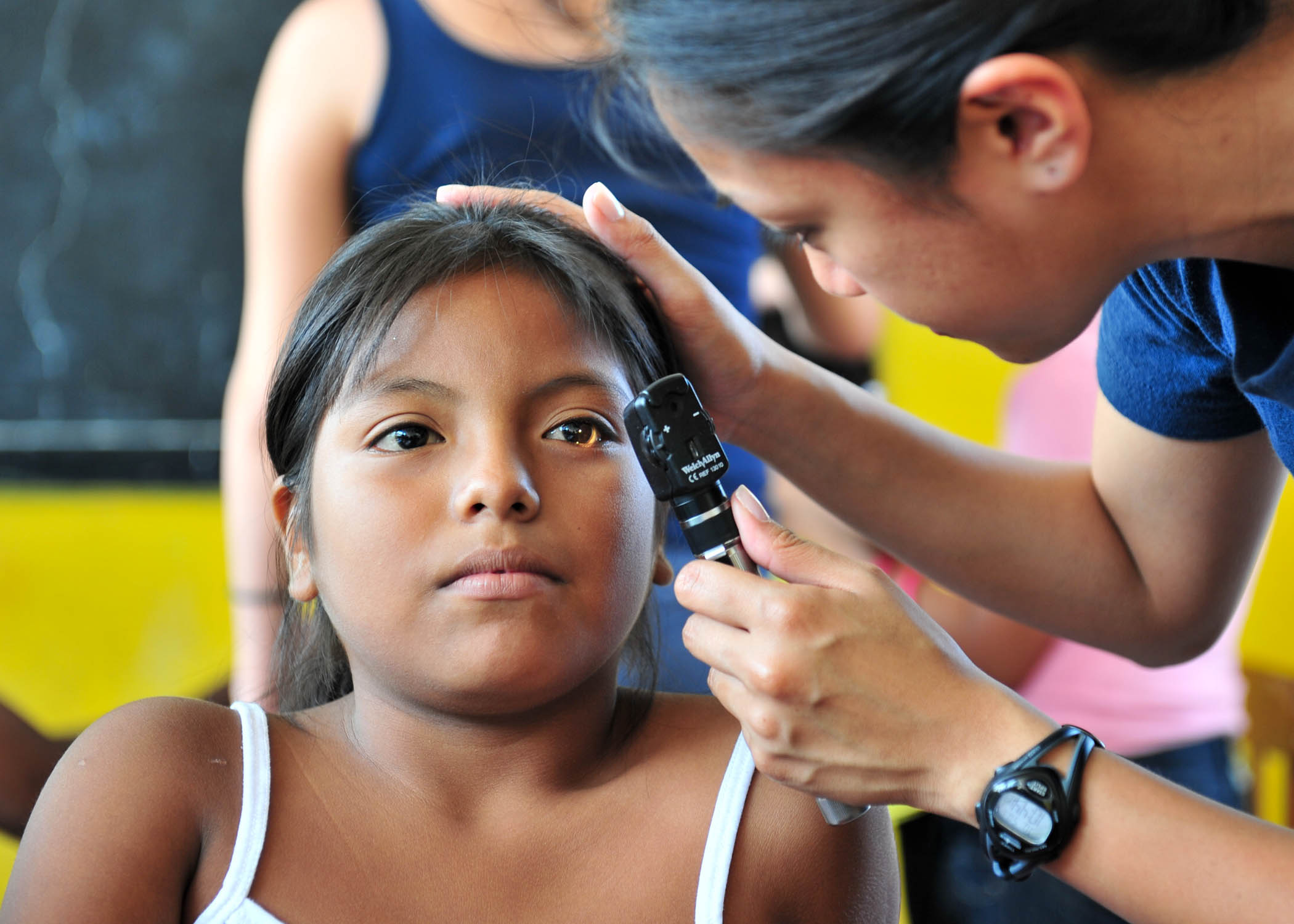
An American nurse examining a girl's eyes, Operation Continuing Promise

== Health ==
Emelin, a 13-year-old female, spoke at the United Nations in March 2015 and emphasized the need for health care in her community. A majority of Guatemalans pay for their health costs out-of-pocket, creating unequal access to services. She said, "The biggest problems we face as adolescents in my community are early pregnancy, [child]birth, sexual violation and lack of education and health care". 20% of female adolescents and 24% of male adolescents have a comprehensive knowledge of HIV. 14.3% of females living in rural areas have a comprehensive knowledge of HIV and 31.5% of females living in urban areas have a comprehensive knowledge of HIV. In Guatemala, there is little contraception awareness and use among Youth. Guatemala has the highest fertility rate in Latin America even with half of its population under the age of 19.

A mission called Continuing Promise works to provide health care and community assistance to Latin American youth.

== Violence ==
Crime in Guatemala is one issue facing youth. Guatemala has one of the highest homicide rates in the world and lies within one of the most dangerous regions of the hemisphere - Central America. Violence most often emerges in the presence of gangs and drug trafficking, promoting crimes such as theft and kidnapping. "Gang youth are widely perceived to be the single most important contributors to violence and insecurity in Central American cities". Guatemalan youth struggle with transitions out of a gang to a more stable environment. The Evangelical-Pentecostal religion provides hope to Guatemalan youth, attempting to exit gangs, through conversion.

In Guatemala, the Evangelical-Protestant Church receives funding from United States Agency for International Development to help at-risk youth. The funding is used to help correct structural factors that push delinquent youth into gang participation. The ties within the Church provide youth with social capital and connections that may aid in seeking employment.

A great risk of death exists for youth attempting to exit Guatemalan gangs. Religious organizations believe that the root causes of gang participation are "poverty, weak schools, and unemployment".

Youth participation in violence has become normalized. While reliable data regarding crime is sparse, there are widespread fears of crime facing Guatemalan youth. "Maras [gangs] are generally associated with low-income urban areas, due to high levels of inequality and the lack of social, economic and cultural alternatives available in this context", making Guatemala City one of the most dangerous areas in Guatemala. Gangs dominate public space, often limiting areas where others can interact. An estimated 53-330 gangs reside in Guatemala City.

Gangs can provide youth with a sense of identity. Youths gain a large amount of social capital in their participation in gangs, making gangs attractive and luring for youth who lack resources. Youth male gang members who are often the perpetrators of violence also fear for their own safety within the gang. Young men in gangs are threatened by members of their affiliated gang and sometimes victims of violence within the gang.

Open Schools works to help at risk youth by providing alternatives to participation in gangs.

== Migration ==
A youth's parents may leave home and migrate to coastal areas or other countries where education and health services are more comprehensive. Parents also migrate to the United States, Mexico, and Canada to support their family and search of economic opportunity. Political corruption and violence are factors that cause a parent to leave their child or children with other caretakers. Youth left behind feel guilt for their parents' sacrifice and often leave school to find work. "9% of children living in migrant households receiving remittances dropped out of school". Adverse effects on youth of parents migrating include: insecurity, drug use, sexual promiscuity, anxiety, and loneliness.

Youth whose parents migrated to the United States often defend them, saying, "they are not criminals, because they are going to search for a better life for their family members", normalizing their experience. Guatemalan youth see the allure of moving to various other areas as economic incentives but the threats of violence and deportation as well as loss of social capital dissuade many youth from migrating.
