= Río Bravo, Suchitepéquez =

Rio Bravo
- Municipality
- Location map of Rio Bravo, Guatemala
- Coordinates: 14.401100°N 91.319520°W
- Country: Guatemala
- Department: Suchitepéquez Department
- Municipality: Río Bravo

Government
  - Mayor: Juan Francisco López Díaz (UNE)

Area
  - Total: 175 km^{2} (68 sq mi)
- Elevation: 46 m (151 ft)

Population (2018 census)
  - Total: 27,606
  - Density: 158/km^{2} (409/sq mi)
- Time zone: CST
- Website: riobravo.blogspot.com

Río Bravo is a town, with a population of 15,391 (2018 census), and a municipality in the Suchitepéquez department of Guatemala. Rio Bravo is a municipality that belongs to the department of Suchitepequez, in the Republic of Guatemala. The town was established December 10, 1951.

Formerly it was known as San Francisco Rio Bravo and belonged to the municipality of Santa Barbara. Its population was established near the Grande de Zacapa River, from which it gets its name.

It is located 127 km from the capital of Guatemala, reaching the coastal plain along the Pacific Ocean, because of this temperature is normally maintained at 32 °C but drops to 22 °C or 37 °C totals.

== Economy ==
The main economic activities are agriculture, livestock and agribusiness. Its main crops are sugar cane, rubber, corn, beans, bananas and plantains. This municipality has a land area of 305 square kilometers and a population of approximately 17805 inhabitants (est. 2007).

== History ==
The town was established near the Rio Grande and called San Francisco Caserío. Formerly it was known as San Francisco Rio Bravo. At that time there was a village belonging to the municipality of Santa Barbara. By Decree No. 226 of the Congress of the Republic, it was elevated to the category of Municipality, segregating the territory of Santa Barbara in a document dated December 10, 1951 in the public square of San Francisco Rio Bravo. Its first mayor imposed by the Committee for independence, was Mr. José Fuentes and the first elected was Mr. Daniel Foronda. The management of the creation of the municipality was conducted by the Civic Committee municipality of Rio Bravo, backed by 23 owners and property managers and most residents of the population. The census of April 3, 1950, indicates that Rio Bravo had 1300 inhabitants.

== Demographics ==
The population of Rio Bravo is mostly Latino, counting the Mayan population in communities and Agrarian Community Sololateca Colonia La Campesina.

== Hydrography ==
The municipality of Rio Bravo rivers cross it 14 1 stream, and 22 trenches, the main rivers are: the San Francisco River, the Rio Grande River and Siguacán. At the top there are some minor water sources; the municipal head is supplied by diverting water from the river.

Other Sources (Births, Well, Springs): at the top, there are some sources of water between them in the La Colonia as well as another source in the Lotificación Santo Tomas, Colonia Las Flores; Hot Springs (Aguas Calientes) farm El Recuerdo; There is a gap in farm Mangales and in Lotificación Rio Seco; the municipal head is supplied by diverting water from the river.

== Lynching in 2015 ==
A sixteen-year-old teenage girl was burned to death there in May 2015 by a vigilante mob after being accused by some of involvement in the killing of a taxi driver earlier in the month. A crowd of at least one hundred people watched as she walked around the burning and rolled on the ground crying for help. No one intervened to save the girl from the beating or to extinguish the fire. The girl lay on a main street in town and when the fire began dying out, Gregorio Gutierrez Lima ran out of the crowd and doused her body with fuel and her body was engulfed in flames.

While the attack was in retaliation for the girl's presumed involvement in the robbery and murder of a local taxi driver, with two male accomplices being absent, without a trial, it is unknown whether she was involved or simply in the wrong place at the wrong time and just happened to be near the two male individuals who fled the scene.

== See also ==
- Crime in Guatemala
- Violence against women in Guatemala
