= Human trafficking in Guatemala =

Human trafficking is an act of recruiting, transporting, and harboring people against their will; usually by using force. People who are trafficked are mostly used for sexual purposes or illegal work. These acts include: forced marriages, trafficking for human organs, and gaining members for organized crimes. Every country in the world deals with this crime, and are usually classified as transit countries, target countries, or source countries. Guatemala is a part of North America, which is a target country; this means they contain human trafficking victims.

== History ==
For the past few years, Guatemala has become a hot spot for multiple types of sex trafficking. Sex trafficking, kidnapping, and illegal adoption rings are part of a larger string of criminal acts. Part of the reason for this is the failure of the peace accords and the government not being able to implement tax reform. Trafficking is also encouraged by a police force that is constantly having to choose corruption or death, and deciding to participate in trafficking to avoid the later. There has also been a number of elected officials who are under investigation for either participating in sex trafficking or protecting establishments were trafficking occurs. It is also believed that “territorial groups” run brothels which contribute to these sexual acts. These groups are often local gangs running drugs or more established gangs that deal with international drug deals. It is also common for family-run sex trafficking to appear near the border, ports, and underpopulated jungles; which tend to usually go unnoticed.

Guatemala has also made major improvements towards fighting trafficking. In 2012, the Guatemalan government established a trafficking prosecution unit that also helps prosecutors in the country's outer regions. There is also talk of this unit being expanded to eight additional states.

== Types of Human Trafficking ==
The most common types of human trafficking reported in Guatemala is sexual exploitation including: forced prostitution, child sex tourism and child pornography. Sex trafficking in Guatemala is a problem. Sexual types of trafficking are more public as they require a consumer whereas labor trafficking (debt bondage, involuntary domestic servitude, child labor, and child soldiers) is less visible to concerned bystanders. Less common in Guatemala but still existent in some trafficking circles is the organ trade, where people are abducted for organ harvest. People are often upset by the advertising of selling people for sex and are therefore more likely to report these findings to law enforcement. Another large aspect of trafficking in Guatemala is adoption fraud, this is when children are forcefully taken from their biological mothers to be resold to family looking to adopt a foreign child. Guatemala is the second most popular country for foreign adoption after China, which has opened up the market for trafficked children to become a lucrative industry.

== Statistics ==
Cases of identified trafficking victims have significantly decreased from previous years, dropping from 673 in 2015 to 316 victims in 2018. In this 2018 study it was observed that 292 of the 316 victims were children. Many of the victims are native Guatemalans under the age of 18. The children are often used to collect money though begging, pick-pocketing and working as hawkers. The young women are sexually exploited or sold and young men are forced into gang life, selling and transporting drugs along with other gang related activity.

In 2016 the United Nations International Children's Emergency Fund (UNICEF) and the International Commission Against Impunity in Guatemala (CICIG) estimate that the trafficking industry involving sexual exploitation brings in $1.6 billion US dollars to Guatemala each year. This is equivalent to 12.3 billion Guatemalan quetzal, which is 2.7% of the Gross Domestic Product (GDP). It is believed that only 3% of traffickers are known and many run under the name of large trafficking circles to avoid detection. The United Nations Office on Drugs and Crime has stated that there are only two prosecutors willing to convict traffickers in the country, because of this there have been low conviction numbers with only 20 convicted in 2014.

According to the United States assessment of Guatemala in relation to human trafficking, Guatemala was on the Tier 2 watch list for human trafficking in 2017. The country was placed at Tier 2 in 2023.

In 2023, the Organised Crime Index noted that the crime was carried out by small local gangs as well as larger organised groups.

== Border Crossings ==
The borders in Central America involving Honduras, Mexico, El Salvador, Belize and Nicaragua are considered hot-spots for human trafficking supply and transit. Every year many women and children attempt the crossing from Guatemala to the United States though Mexico. They often will wait by the Guatemala-Mexico border and get picked up by traffickers promising safe travel for a cost. Many migrants can't afford it and will later pay though bonded labor or other manners such as sexual exploitation or working as a mule to pay off the debt. A global report on Trafficking in Persons by the United Nations Office on Drugs and Crime (UNODC) reported that cross-border trafficking in person originating in Central America and The Caribbean reports for 12% of the all human trafficking detected in North America. It has been stated that Guatemala has highest rates of trafficked child labor in the Americas with over 800,000 children forcefully working for gangs and other organizations.

== Prevention ==
Guatemalan law enforcement require international assistance to fight human trafficking and assure justice. A project funded by the Government of Canada that supports the SICA Member States (Belize, Costa Rica, Dominican Republic, Guatemala, El Salvador, Honduras, Panama, Nicaragua) improve the collaboration against Human Trafficking within Central America. The project based on the "Comprehensive Strategy to Combat Trafficking in Persons and Smuggling of Migrants" by the UNODC for Central America and the Caribbean aims to increase the actual structure of border control in Central America and the Dominican Republic. Guatemala has signed and ratified the Protocol to Prevent, Suppress and Punish Trafficking in Person. For a more efficient international cooperation that has resulted in a considerable increase in the number of convictions, the government has established appropriate laws. However, while the government has improved its efforts to stop human trafficking, inadequate funding and training remain restricting the capability of the officer division to manage various investigations and prosecutions in the whole country.

=== Prosecution ===
Among the new anti-trafficking law and the strengthened enforcement efforts from the government against human trafficking, the Guatemalan government has advanced with investigations, prosecutions, and convictions compared to previous years. In early 2009, to guarantee the appropriate care and compensation for damages to the victims, Guatemalan government in the National Law decree the Law Against Sexual Violence, Exploitation, Trafficking in Persons (VET) as an effort to assist victims. Article 48 of the VET added Article 202 to the Guatemalan criminal code, stating that "the capture, transport, transfer, retention, harboring or reception of more persons constitutes a crime of human trafficking". Similar to other penalties for severe crimes that are adequately stringent, the new anti-trafficking law prescribes sentence between eight and eighteen years of imprisonment which are sufficiently and rigorous by the government.
