= Illegal drug trade in Guatemala =

The illegal drug trade in Guatemala includes trans-shipment of cocaine to the United States. According to some reports, Mexican drug cartels such as Sinaloa have also established poppy growing operations there. There is a reported relationship between the Mexican Los Zetas cartel and the Guatemalan Kaibiles military force.

== Effectual characteristics ==
=== Outside support ===
Guatemala has become one of the larger drug smuggling countries in Latin America precisely because drug cartels in neighboring states have offered their support. Cartels in Colombia have sent upwards of 48 tons worth of cocaine to Guatemala and the cartels have shared techniques for moving cocaine unnoticed, such as mixing cocaine with fruit pulp. Additionally, Mexican cartels have actively cooperated with Guatemalan drug dealers because Mexico has become the primary destination for smuggled drugs. This relationship has encompassed most major drugs, including the selling of raw opium gum and, eventually, the processed poppy, which carries a higher price per kilo for Guatemalan growers. Belizean support has allowed inhabitants in Guatemala to start growing marijuana as well, which has become popular for both consumption and smuggling to Mexico.

=== Domestic policing ===
Within Guatemala, the domestic police has experienced difficulty combating the growing and selling of drugs and combating the inefficiency and corruption in the police force. In the 1980s, there was a low police officer to citizen ratio and the state poorly trained police officers and offered low wages, which contributed to low morale. Consequently, bribes became a common method for circumventing anti-drug police efforts and countering successful arrests. Additionally, police forces in many areas were involved with the drug cartels, offering assistance, making money, and acquiring additional local power and influence. The low quality of policing and different forms of corruption lead to low public support and faith in the ability of the police and has led to the public's unwillingness to cooperate and decision to start lynch mobs.

=== Geography ===
Geography in Guatemala has created both an ideal climate for growing drugs and divided regions for smuggling drugs. The vast amounts of mountains and forests that divide the country make governing and policing more difficult. In the mountains located in the provinces of San Marcos and Huehuetenango, inhabitants are able to grow different types of drugs, primarily opium. Additionally, these provinces are along the northern border of Guatemala which connects the opium fields to Mexico, the primary destination of the majority of drugs that are grown or smuggled through Guatemala. Due to the close proximity with Mexico, Guatemalan and Mexican police have experienced difficulty combating the fields as the two governments must respect the other's sovereign borders and do not have complete authority in the area. The northern forests in Guatemala have allowed marijuana growers and smugglers to maneuver away from authorities as well. Through the support of growers in Belize, people in Guatemala were able to acquire seeds and connections to start growing and exporting their product to Mexico, while avoiding the more restrictive laws and effort by the government in Belize.

== Dynamics ==
Guatemala connects Honduras and Mexico along common drug routes between Central America and the United States. Its long, unpatrolled coastline and sparse jungles make it a popular landing point for boats and planes carrying drugs from South America, while its borders are understaffed and ill-equipped to fully exert customs controls.

"According to a December 2008 report from the U.S. National Drug Intelligence Center, less than 1 percent of the estimated 600 to 700 tons of cocaine that departed South America for the United States in 2007 transited Central America. The rest, for the most part, passed through the Caribbean Sea or Pacific Ocean en route to Mexico. Since then, land-based shipment of cocaine through Central America appears to have ballooned. Earlier this month, U.S. Ambassador to Guatemala Stephen McFarland estimated in an interview with a Guatemalan newspaper that cocaine now passes through that country at a rate of approximately 300 to 400 tons per year."

According to the International Crisis Group, “the presence of Mexican cartels fighting on Guatemalan territory demonstrated how important and competitive the eastern region had become for the transnational cocaine trade”.

A 2009 STRATFOR report corroborates: "Mexican drug traffickers appear to operate much more extensively than in any other Central American country; this may be due, at least in part, to the relationship between Los Zetas and the Guatemalan Kaibiles. Beyond the apparently more-established Zeta smuggling operations there, several recent drug seizures — including an enormous 1,800-acre poppy plantation attributed to the Sinaloa cartel — make it clear that other Mexican drug-trafficking organizations are currently active inside Guatemala."

== See also ==
- Crime in Guatemala
- Illegal drug trade in Latin America
