= Sexual assault of migrants from Latin America to the United States =

Sexual assault of Latin American migrant women and girls

Many people migrating from Latin America to the United States are victims of sexual assault and sex trafficking in Mexico. People who migrate through or from Mexico without legal permission must enter into dealings with smugglers and, often, criminal gangs. Perpetrators may be smugglers or gang members, but can also be government officials, bandits, or other migrants. Sexual assault is sometimes part of the "price" of smuggling, and some women have reported preparing for it in advance by taking contraception.

People without legal permission to migrate are much less likely to report being the victim of a crime or otherwise take actions which may jeopardize their ability to cross the border or remain in the United States. Although data is difficult to collect and analyze, Amnesty International reported in 2010 that the proportion of women and girls who are sexually assaulted over the course of their journey might be as high as 60%.

== Background ==
People travel from or through Mexico to the United States for several reasons, including poverty, lack of opportunity, and unsafe conditions. Many determined to improve their conditions, but who are unable to migrate with legal permission, find other means to cross the border, often at great risk to themselves. Despite the risks and abuses suffered along the way, many people make several attempts.

Amnesty International published a report in 2010 which found that "women and children -- particularly unaccompanied children -- are especially vulnerable. They face serious risks of trafficking and sexual assault by criminals, other migrants and corrupt public officials."

Other women also migrate to reunite with family members, to search for better economic opportunities through employment, to escape from the domestic violence they are victims of, or the violent conditions and political instability in their homeland. Even though Human rights agreements have established the need for these women to be ensured with security and protection, especially protection from the possible sexual violence they might encounter, the systems that run the US-Mexico border continue to facilitate and enable the constant sexual assault.

== Crimes ==
Perpetrators of crimes against these migrants are often those involved with people smuggling, known as coyotaje. They may also be bandits, members of criminal gangs, other migrants, or government employees in either Mexico or the U.S. Sexual violence may be considered part of the "price" women must pay in order to be smuggled over the border. Sexual violence, or threatening to sexually assault someone, may also be one part of a larger criminal plan to extort money from the migrants or their families.

Rape of migrants is so common that some women and girls plan for it, taking or bringing contraception, or they may be required to take it by smugglers. A PBS NewsHour story about sexual assault of female migrants interviewed a pharmacist in Altar in Sonora, who said that the town is one of the last stops for someone about to cross the border, and that in the pharmacy she frequently receives the same question: "What can I do in case I'm raped, and I don't want to get pregnant."

The parts of Mexico near the U.S. border, and the state of Chihuahua and city of Juárez in particular, are some of the most dangerous places for women in general in Mexico, according to a Reuters report on the "pandemic" of violence against women in Mexico. News reports have stated that in some areas near the border, rapists began hanging their victims' garments from "rape trees" as trophies, though Jennifer L. Johnson has argued the source for this to be an "essay circulating in the conservative blogosphere" rather than scholarly work.

=== Militarized border rape ===
Sexual assault is sometimes perpetrated by Border Patrol and Immigration authorities, such as Immigration and Naturalization Services (INS) officials, as well as Border Patrol agents at the U.S-Mexico border. This practice has been called "militarized border rape", and has been claimed to be disregarded because the US-Mexico border conflict is not officially defined to be a “war zone”. These rapes are often planned, and can be of a systematic nature. Immigration authorities who commit the rapes take advantage of their positions of power over undocumented women. One victim of sexual assault by a Border Patrol agent stated, “We feared the worse (sic). We didn’t know where he was going to take us. Just the sight of him with a badge and a gun was enough to intimidate anyone.” The few women who opt to report and prosecute after being sexually assaulted have to face institutions such as the INS, the U.S. government and the U.S. legal system.

=== Sexual assault of children in migrant shelters ===
The number of children held in migrant shelters has reached almost 15,000. According to the Department of Health and Human Services, the national network of more than 100 shelters are at 92% capacity. The largest of these migrant shelters in the country is in Tornillo, Texas with almost 2,800 children living in heated, sand-colored tents that are set up on a patch of desert a few hundred yards from the Rio Grande. Many of the children in these migrant shelters are subjected to sexual abuse.

In the last four years alone, there has been over 6,000 complaints of sexual abuse towards children in migrant shelters. From October 2014 to July 2018, the Office of Refugee Resettlement received over 4,500 complaints. The Department of Justice received an additional 1,300 complaints. Over a hundred of these were allegations of sexual abuse by shelter staff members. According to federal documents released on February 26, 2019 by Florida Representative Ted Deutch, unattended migrant children have allegedly experienced sexual assault from the staff in Office of Refugee Resettlement. Most allegations are directed towards other minors and 178 allegations were directed towards staff.

Drugs given to children in custody have played a major role towards the increase in sexual assault. Many of these children were medicated with psychotropics without their parents' consent. According to the ongoing lawsuit over the Reno v. Flores settlement, one child cited in the lawsuit reported taking up to nine pills in the morning and another seven in the evening, without knowing what the medication was. Most of the allegations center on Shiloh Residential Treatment Center, in Manvel, Texas. But lawyers in the Flores case, who have access to the medical records of their clients, say the problem is widespread. Children were often threatened and beaten if they refused to take the drugs administered by facility staff. According to court records, a child named Julio Z. said, "they told me that if I did not take the medicine I could not leave. That the only way I could get out of Shiloh was if I took the pills."

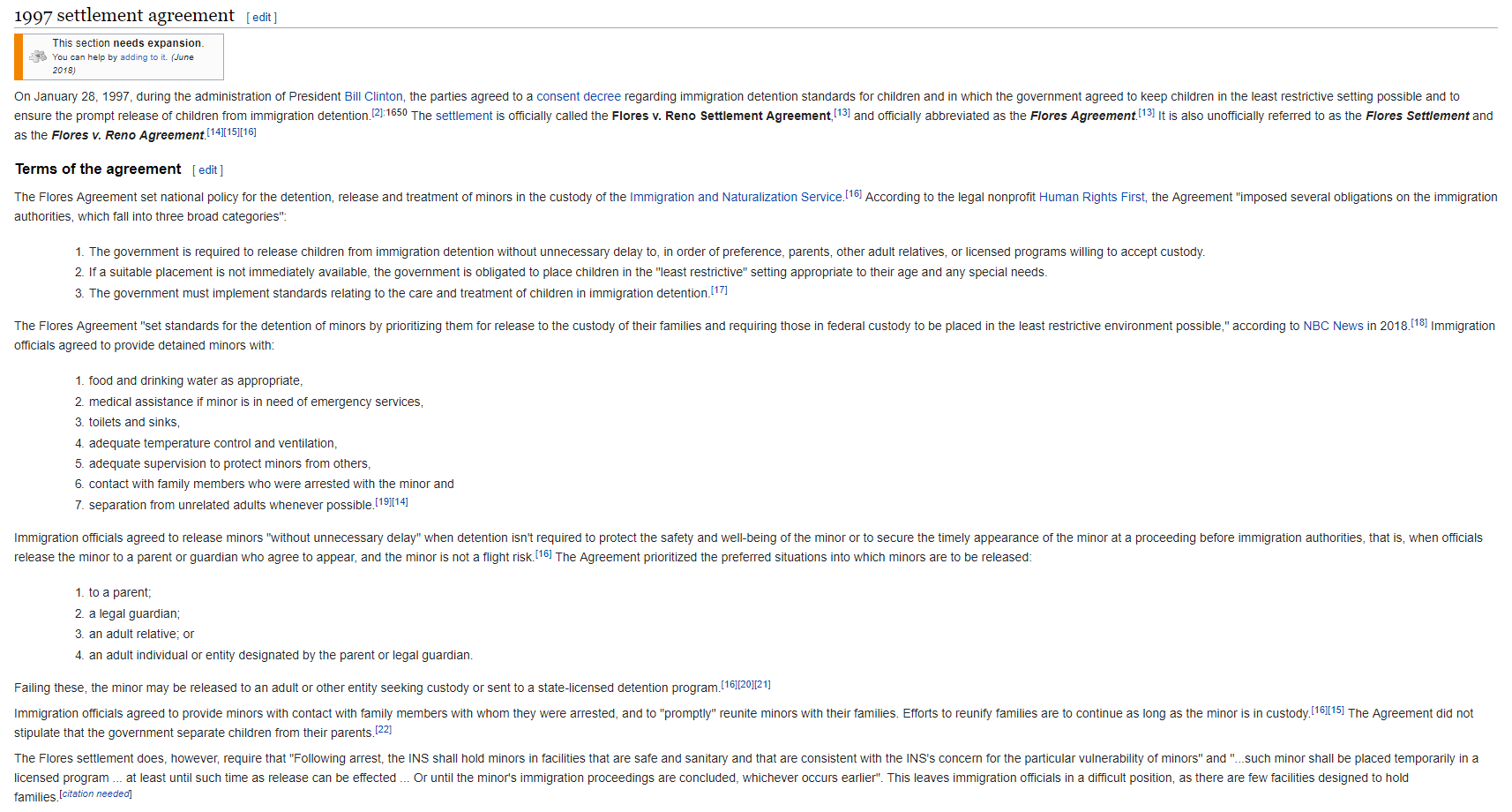
Reno v. Flores Terms of Agreement

On July 30, 2018, U.S. District Judge Dolly Gee ordered that immigrant children held at Shiloh Treatment Center could no longer be medicated with psychiatric drugs without the consent of a parent or court authorization However records show that immigrant children are still being drugged even after court orders. According to lawyers representing children held at Shiloh Treatment Center, the government is failing to comply with the order. These children reported that the Court's order had little to no impact on the Office of Refugee Resettlement placing children at Shiloh or on the treatment faced there.

Recently in March, 2019, a Guatemalan father identified as J.E.B, filed a lawsuit against two nonprofits housing migrant children. He alleges that his 10-year-old son, identified as F.C.B, had been forced to take psychotropic drugs and sexually assaulted while in custody. According to CNN, "the lawsuit alleges that both facilities "acted with fraud, malice and gross neglect" and that staff at both facilities physically assaulted F.C.B." The lawsuit also claims that F.C.B was sexually assaulted by another detained child during his custody at Shiloh. F.C.B was viewed as a liability and both the father and son were quickly deported.

== Estimates ==
Cases of abuses are rarely reported or prosecuted, and data about these crimes is difficult to acquire or assess.

People who do not have legal permission to migrate from or through Mexico do not typically have effective access to the same criminal justice system as legal migrants. In addition to the stigma attached to sexual assaults for anyone, they are unlikely to be willing to take actions which they believe may result in being unable to cross the border or remain across the border. Because many of the offenses involve people in power or connected to organized crime, many women also fear retaliation for speaking up.

The newspaper La Jornada surveyed women attempting to migrate while they were in Mexican border cities. 30% said coyotes forced them to have sex as payment.

The United Nations estimated that among women crossing without husbands or families, as many as 70% were victims of some form of abuse.

At the time of the Amnesty International report, the non-profit estimated "as many as six in 10 women and girl migrants experience sexual violence during the journey." It cites a 2006 study of already-detained migrant women in which 23 of 90 reported experiencing violence, with 13 saying the perpetrator was a state official. The researchers involved believed actual numbers were likely higher.

According to a report by Splinter News, as many as 80% of women and girls coming to the United States from Central America are sexually assaulted.

Michelle Brané of the Women's Refugee Commission told Tucson Weekly that "nonprofit groups and even the U.S. Office of Refugee Resettlement ... estimate that the vast majority of women and female children encounter some sort of sexual assault en route to the United States," and that "it's become the norm, and in many cases with female children, they just assume that there's been some sort of incident."

== Efforts to provide help or remedy the problems ==
Amnesty International called for state and non-government organizations to ensure proper medical and psychological services for people who have experienced sexual violence, to design processes that facilitate safe reporting of crimes, and to evaluate the ways in which they find and protect victims.

In 2007 the Mexican government passed legislation intending to curb violence against women. According to Reuters, it also "established so-called gender violence alerts, a tool to mobilize national, state and local governments to catch perpetrators and reduce murders. Yet in practice the gender alert has never been activated."

In an interview with NPR, the sheriff of Santa Cruz County, Arizona, correlated increased sexual assaults at the border with increased border security that pushes migrants into increasingly remote areas, and also points to the increased role of organized crime in smuggling.

=== Violence Against Women Act of 1994 ===
The Violence Against Women Act of 1994 was signed into law by President Clinton on September 13, 1994. The goal of this act, through Section 1154, was to allow battered immigrant women and their children, as well as parents of abused children, the right to “self-petition” for permanent legal residency status, which eliminated the need of the citizen spouse to file such petition. For the next few years the VAWA of 1994 was one way in which the United States government aimed to protect immigrant women, but it was not until 2000 when improvements were made to this legislation. The Battered Immigrant Women Protection Act of 2000 (VAWA 2000) was introduced to further protect and provide a different type of immigrant relief for immigrant women who experienced violent crimes, sexual assault and trafficking.

This revision to the VAWA of 1994 included the addition of "U" and "T" visas, which were introduced by the Victims of Trafficking and Violence Protection Act of 2000. The "U" visas aim to protect eligible noncitizen victims of violent crimes as long as they demonstrate willingness to "assist in the investigation or prosecution of criminal offense "by providing them and their eligible family members work authorization permits." The “T” visas aim to protect noncitizen victims of "severe" forms of human trafficking. As defined by the VAWA of 2000, severe forms of human trafficking include:

(1) sex trafficking in which a commercial sex act is induced by fraud, force, coercion, or in which the victim is younger than 18 years of age, or (2) the recruitment, harboring, transportation, provision, or obtaining of a person for labor or services, through use of force, fraud, or coercion for the purpose of subjection to involuntary servitude or slavery.

These visas provide victims with deferred action, meaning it protects them from removal, and also provides them with a work permit, while those with "bona fide T-visas" can benefit from other resources such as cash assistance, food stamps, and job training.

== Mental health ==
Many immigrant women who experience sexual assault at the US-Mexico border keep their experiences a secret due to the shame and stigmatization connected to experiencing rape. These women fear the consequences of reporting the crime, thinking their family's safety could be jeopardized if they disclose who their attackers are due to the amount of power they potentially possess if connected to the U.S. immigration authorities. Those few women who report their assault have to face scrutiny as their stories are often questioned and discredited by the authorities in charge of investigating such crimes. These are factors that can affect these women's mental health as they are retraumatized during the investigation. One victim was forced to file a lawsuit after being accused of lying and threatened by the Office of Inspector General. Faced with the severe trauma of the assault, and the threats of yet another powerful entity against her, the victim attempted suicide. Her mental well-being and capacity to face the re-traumatization of the events as the investigation was conducted, the OIG's attempts to protect the accused agent and discredit their story, prompted her to seek suicide as her only way out.

Mental health practitioners must understand how their immigration status keeps them in the shadows in order to protect those around them. It is also important to explore the multifaceted process in helping them due to the multiple systems and intersectionalities. It is key to consider the way power dynamics at these different levels can affect the helping process for immigrant women. It is emphasized that for the helping process to be able to successful at empowering these women, it is vital to examine the intersections between gender, race, language and immigration; with the aid of adequate intervention with immigrant women.
