= Sex trafficking in Guatemala =

Citizen and foreign victims, including indgienous peoples, are sex trafficked into and out of the departments of Guatemala. They are raped and physically and psychologically harmed in locations within these administrative divisions.

Sex trafficking in Guatemala is human trafficking for the purpose of sexual exploitation and slavery that occurs in the Republic of Guatemala.

Sex trafficking victims in the country are from all ethnic groups in Guatemala, including the Maya and other indigenous peoples, and foreigners. Guatemalan citizens, primarily women and girls, are sex trafficked to the different departments of Guatemala, as well as other countries, particularly Mexico and the United States. The illegal transporting and sexual assault of migrants from Latin America to the United States is a problem. Foreign women and girls, including migrants, are also trafficked to and within Guatemala.

Children, deported migrants, and people in poverty and with little education are particularly vulnerable to sex trafficking. Sex trafficked victims are deceived or abducted and forced into prostitution and unfree labour. They are guarded or locked up in brothels, homes, businesses, and other locations. They are threatened and experience physical and psychological trauma. Their family members are sometimes threatened.

Sex trafficking and exploitation have permeated all levels of Guatemalan society. Traffickers have been male and female. A number of traffickers are members of or facilitated by gangs. Government officials and workers and police have been complicit and corruption in Guatemala is an issue. Some perpetrators are the victims’ family members, including parents. Traffickers use social media and other phone and internet websites and apps to lure victims.

The scale of sex trafficking in Guatemala is not known because of the lack of data. Government anti-sex trafficking efforts have been criticized for being insufficient. Law enforcement is hindered by limited operating budgets and resources. The online sex trade is an issue.

== Links to illegal drug trade ==
Drug gangs in Guatemala have relied on sex trafficking as an alternative source of profit.

== Non-governmental organizations ==
El Refugio de la Niñez operates a shelter that helps restore victims of sex trafficking in Guatemala. It is supported by the United Nations Trust Fund for Victims of Human Trafficking.
