= Sex trafficking in Mexico =

Sex trafficking in Mexico, or human trafficking, is the illegal practice of sexual exploitation of human beings in the United Mexican States. Sex trafficking is considered a form of modern-day slavery because of its attempt to recruit, entice, transport, or coerce someone into non-consensual sexual acts for personal gain. Mexico is an origin, transit, and destination for sex trafficking, a global industry that earns profits of approximately 150 billion a year.

== Description ==
Sex trafficking victims in the country are from all ethnic groups, including the indigenous peoples of Mexico, and foreigners. Those most at risk of getting exploited are women, unaccompanied minors, natives, individuals with disabilities, those who identify as LGBTQ, and immigrants. Men are sexually exploited as well, but not to the extent of women and children. Victims are deceived and/or abducted and forced into prostitution. They are sex trafficked to different states in Mexico, along with other countries, namely the United States. Perpetrators tend to focus on low-income communities with little to no education and lure victims by promising a better life, more money, romantic relationships, or blackmailing. They are forced to live in poor living conditions, often guarded or locked up in a variety locations such as brothels, bars, hotels, and homes. While being held against their will, victims are drugged, raped, mentally abused, tortured, and or murdered. A majority of sex trafficking survivors experience mental health problems and sexually transmitted diseases. Victims are not the only ones affected by sex trafficking, their families are sometimes threatened or held hostage by perpetrators to ensure compliance.

Sex trafficking and exploitation have permeated all levels of Mexican society, both male and female perpetrators. Due to the transformation of organized crime in Mexico, sex trafficking has been rising over the past years. Human trafficking is said to be the third-largest illegal activity in Mexico, behind gun and drug trade. Mexico's head of financial intelligence unit (UIF), Santiago Nieto, describes that many of the country's infamous cartels have branched out into trafficking, particularly those whose main business have been falling apart. To add on, corruption has been an ongoing issue in Mexico. Government officials and police authorities have been caught participating in trafficking crimes such as receiving payments for facilitating the entry and illicit residency of captive traffickers.

The true scale of sex trafficking in Mexico is difficult to measure due to the lack of data from corruption, poor record keeping, the secretive nature of sex trafficking crimes, the fact that only a small minority of cases are reported to the authorities, and other factors. The Mexican government recorded a total of 658 trafficking victims in 2019, 706 victims in 2018, 667 victims in 2016, and 814 victims in 2015. In 2019, amongst the 658 victims, it was reported that roughly 54 percent were women, 18 percent were male, and 28 percent did not identify their gender. Local, state, and federal anti-sex trafficking efforts have been criticized for being insufficient. Authorities have been accused of being apathetic. Anti-sex trafficking organizations, as well as victims’ families, in Mexico have received threats.

== Mexican drug war ==
Drug cartels and gangs fighting in the Mexican drug war have relied on sex trafficking as an alternative source of profit to finance their organizations, buy weapons, expand their territory, and for other purposes. The cartels and gangs also abduct women to use as their personal sex slaves and force them into unfree labour.

== Non-governmental organization ==
Justicia para Nuestras Hijas (JPNH) supports victims and investigations of sex and labour trafficking in Mexico. It is supported by the United Nations Trust Fund for Victims of Human Trafficking.

== See also ==
- Human trafficking in Mexico
