= List of massacres in El Salvador =

The following are lists of massacres that have occurred in El Salvador (numbers may be approximate). There were some 27 separate documented civilian massacres in the Salvadoran Civil War era alone (1979–1989), in total the war directly claimed 70,000 to 80,000 lives. Additional ongoing violence related to the massacres and their obfuscation has claimed numerous activists, religious leaders, university professors, mayors, and foreigners in the decades following the civil war until the present day.

== Pre-civil war ==
Name	Date	Location	Deaths	Notes
Christmas Day Massacre	25 December 1922	Downtown San Salvador	"dozens"	The Red League paramilitary, Salvadoran Army, National Police, and National Guard shot at a crowd of people supporting the presidential campaign of Miguel Tomás Molina ahead of the 1923 presidential election.
La Matanza	22 January 1932 – 11 July 1932	Western El Salvador	10,000 to 40,000	Led to decline of native Pipil (Nahuat) language and lack of linguistic self-identification due to induced climate of fear
Student massacre of 1975	30 July 1975	National Hospital Rosales, San Salvador	unknown (over 100)	
Cathedral Slope massacre	8 May 1979	San Salvador Cathedral, San Salvador	24	Civil War followed

== Salvadoran Civil War era ==
Name	Date	Location	Deaths	Notes
Sumpul River massacre	14 May 1980	Sumpul River near Las Aradas, Chalatenango	300 to 600	
Lempa River massacre	15-19 March 1981	Lempa River, Victoria, Cabañas department	200	Mass murder of civilians by Salvadoran and Honduran forces who attempted to flee to Honduras by crossing the Lempa River
Santa Cruz massacre	11–19 November 1981	Victoria, Cabañas, Cabañas department	Unknown	The armed forced of El Salvador killed civilians as they deployed scorched earth tactics during an anti-guerrilla military action.
El Mozote massacre	11 December 1981	El Mozote, Morazán	up to 900	Carried out by Atlácatl Battalion of the Salvadoran Army
Santa Rita massacre	17 March 1982	Santa Rita, Chalatenango	8	Carried out by Atonal Battalion of the Salvadoran Army, 4 Dutch journalists among those killed
El Calabozo massacre	21–22 August 1982	El Calabozo, San Vicente	more than 200	Carried out by Atlácatl Battalion of the Salvadoran Army
Tenango and Guadalupe massacre	28 February–1 March 1983	Suchitoto, Cuscatlán	250 mostly women and children	Carried out by Salvadoran Army
1985 Zona Rosa attacks	19 June 1985	Zona Rosa, San Salvador	12-13	Left-wing guerrillas opened fire on the Zona Rosa nightclub, killing 12-13 people including six Americans.

== Post-civil war ==
Name	Date	Location	Deaths	Notes
San Miguelito massacre	4 November 1996	San Miguelito, Nahulingo, Sonsonate	8	Murder of Vázquez family by unidentified armed men
Mejicanos massacre	20 June 2010	Mejicanos, San Salvador	19	Committed by members of the 18th Street gang in retaliation for the killing of one of its members by MS-13 the day prior
Altavista massacre	14 July 2016	Altavista, Ilopango, San Salvador	7	
Vista al Lago massacre	10 October 2016	Vista al Lago, Ilopango, San Salvador	4	Members of MS-13 murdered 4 members of the Salvadoran Air Force.
