= Julia Le Duc =

Mexican photojournalist

- Occupation: Journalist

Julia Le Duc is a Mexican photo journalist based in Matamoros, the Mexican town across the border from Brownsville, Texas. She has covered the American border crisis as a correspondent for La Jornada, and her photograph of the Salvadoran father and his 23-month-old daughter lying face down in the water of the Rio Grande after attempting to swim over to Brownsville became world news on 24 June 2019.

She claimed, "I was drawn to the girl's arm on her father... It was something that moved me in the extreme because it reflects that until her last breath, she was joined to him not only by the shirt but also in that embrace in which they passed together into death."
