= H.R. 5230 (113th Congress) =

United States legislative bill

- Long title: Making supplemental appropriations for the fiscal year ending September 30, 2014, and for other purposes.
- Announced in: the 113th United States Congress
- Sponsored by: Rep. Hal Rogers (R-KY)

Codification
- Agencies affected: United States Department of Homeland Security, U.S. Customs and Border Protection, U.S. Immigration and Customs Enforcement, United States Department of Defense, United States Department of Justice, United States Department of Health and Human Services
- Appropriations: $659 million

Legislative history
- Introduced in the House as H.R. 5230 by Rep. Hal Rogers (R-KY) on July 29, 2014; Committee consideration by United States House Committee on Appropriations

The bill H.R. 5230, also known as the Secure the Southwest Border Supplemental Appropriations Act, 2014 and the Secure the Southwest Border Act of 2014, is a bill that would provide supplemental FY2014 appropriations to several federal agencies for expenses related to the rise in unaccompanied alien children and alien adults accompanied by an alien minor at the southwest border. The bill would also change the procedures for screening and processing unaccompanied alien children who arrive at the border from certain countries. The bill would provide $659 million in supplemental funding.

The bill was introduced into the United States House of Representatives during the 113th United States Congress. The Senate introduced the Emergency Supplemental Appropriations Act, 2014 (S. 2648; 113th Congress) to address the same issues.

== Background ==
The children's immigration crisis refers to the surge in unaccompanied children from Central America seeking entrance to the United States. The surge has increased rapidly, doubling in volume each year, reaching crisis proportions in 2014 when tens of thousands of women and children from Honduras, Guatemala, and El Salvador migrated to the United States. Many of the children had no parent/legal guardian available to provide care or physical custody and quickly overwhelmed local border patrols.

The provisions of H.R. 7311, William Wilberforce Trafficking Victims Protection Reauthorization Act of 2008, signed into law by George W. Bush give substantial rights and protection to unaccompanied children from countries which do not have a common border with the United States. This made expeditious deportation of the large number of children from Central America difficult and expensive, prompting a call by President Barack Obama for an emergency appropriation of nearly $4 billion and resulted in discussions on how to interpret or revise the 2008 law in order to expedite handling large numbers of unaccompanied children.

== Provisions of the bill ==
This summary is based largely on the summary provided by the Congressional Research Service, a public domain source.

The Secure the Southwest Border Supplemental Appropriations Act, 2014 would provide supplemental FY2014 appropriations for the United States Department of Homeland Security (DHS), including U.S. Customs and Border Protection (CBP) and U.S. Immigration and Customs Enforcement (ICE); the United States Department of Defense (DOD); the United States Department of Justice (DOJ); and the United States Department of Health and Human Services (HHS) for expenses related to the rise in unaccompanied alien children and alien adults accompanied by an alien minor at the southwest border.

The bill would permit funds previously appropriated for the United States Department of State, foreign operations, and related programs for assistance to the countries in Central America to be used for repatriation and reintegration activities.

The bill would specify other authorized, restricted, and prohibited uses of appropriated funds.

The bill would include rescissions of funds previously appropriated to various federal agencies.

The Secure the Southwest Border Act of 2014 would amend the William Wilberforce Trafficking Victims Protection Authorization Act of 2008 to change the procedures for screening and processing unaccompanied alien children who arrive at the border from certain countries.

The bill would amend the Immigration and Nationality Act to include the commission of certain drug-related offenses as grounds for per se ineligibility for asylum.

The bill would permit appropriations provided to DOD under this Act to be used for the National Guard to provide support for operations on the southern border.

The bill would prohibit the United States Secretary of the Interior and the United States Secretary of Agriculture (USDA) from impeding, prohibiting, or restricting certain CBP activities on federal lands.

The bill would express the sense of Congress that the United States Secretary of Defense should not allow the placement of unauthorized aliens at military installations unless certain conditions are met.

== Congressional Budget Office report ==
This summary is based largely on the summary provided by the Congressional Budget Office, a public domain source.

Division B of H.R. 5230, the Secure the Southwest Border Act of 2014, would amend the rules that apply to unaccompanied alien children, particularly children from countries other than Mexico or Canada. Among other changes, such children would now have the option to voluntarily depart the United States without appearing before an immigration judge. The Congressional Budget Office (CBO) considers it likely that enacting Division B would reduce the number of children present in the United States receiving means‐tested federal benefits, thereby reducing direct spending for such benefits. However, CBO cannot estimate the potential reduction in direct spending at this time.

== Procedural history ==
H.R. 5230 was introduced into the United States House of Representatives on July 29, 2014, by Rep. Hal Rogers (R-KY). The bill was referred to the United States House Committee on Appropriations. The House was scheduled to vote on the bill on July 31, 2014, but the Republican leadership canceled the vote because they did not have enough votes to pass the bill at that time.

On July 30, 2014, President Barack Obama released a statement of administration policy stating that "his senior adivsors would recommend he veto the bill" if it were presented to him for his signature.

== Debate and discussion ==
On July 9, 2014, a hearing on the crisis was held by the United States Senate Committee on Homeland Security and Governmental Affairs. The testimony of Statement of Craig Fugate Administrator, Federal Emergency Management Agency U.S. Department of Homeland Security was that "We are talking about large numbers of children, without their parents, who have arrived at our border—hungry, thirsty, exhausted, scared and vulnerable." Senator Dianne Feinstein compared the crisis to the American refusal to accept Jewish refugees from Nazi Germany aboard the MS St. Louis. The President's request for additional funds was met in both houses of Congress by proposals to modify or eliminate the rights granted by the 2008 reauthorization of the Victims of Trafficking and Violence Protection Act of 2000

A 2014 Mother Jones article suggests many of these unaccompanied children are attempting to escape abusive situations. Analysis of Border Patrol statistics shows a correlation between gang-related killing of children in Central America, particularly San Pedro Sula in Honduras, and the surge in migration.

In a statement of administration policy, the Obama Administration announced their strong opposition to the bill. According to the statement, "by setting arbitrary timelines for the processing of cases, this bill could create backlogs that could ultimately shift resources away from priority public safety goals like deporting known criminals." The Administration also charged that the bill would hurt due process for the children and could result in children being sent back "to life threatening situations in foreign countries." The Administration also objected that the "limited resources provided in H.R. 5230 are not designated as emergency, but rather come at the expense of other Government functions."

This bill would provide significantly less than President Obama's requested $3.7 billion. It would also provide less than the $2.7 billion found in the Senate supplemental funding bill.

Rep. Hal Rogers, who introduced the bill, urged members to pass the bill, arguing that "more and more immigrants will continue to flood across the border if you fail to act" because resources were running out.

Democratic opposition to the bill stemmed from the changes it would make to the William Wilberforce Trafficking Victims Protection Reauthorization Act of 2008 which would allow unaccompanied child migrants to be deported faster.

== See also ==
- List of bills in the 113th United States Congress
- Illegal immigrant population of the United States
- Illegal immigration to the United States
- Children's immigration crisis
