= Emergency Supplemental Appropriations Act, 2014 =

- Long title: A bill making emergency supplemental appropriations for the fiscal year ending September 30, 2014, and for other purposes.
- Announced in: the 113th United States Congress
- Sponsored by: Senator Barbara Mikulski (D-MD)

Legislative history
- Introduced in the Senate as S. 2648 by Senator Barbara Mikulski (D-MD) on July 23, 2014

The Emergency Supplemental Appropriations Act, 2014 (S. 2648) is a bill that would appropriate supplemental funds for FY2014 to specified federal agencies and programs to respond to the increased apprehensions of unaccompanied minors along the southwestern border, fight wildfires, and support Israel's Iron Dome anti-missile defense system. The bill would provide $2.7 billion in supplemental funding.

The bill was introduced into the United States Senate during the 113th United States Congress. The House bill "Making supplemental appropriations for the fiscal year ending September 30, 2014 (H.R. 5230; 113th Congress)" is intended to address the same issues as this one.

== Background ==
The children's immigration crisis refers to the surge in unaccompanied children from Central America seeking entrance to the United States. The surge has increased rapidly, doubling in volume each year, reaching crisis proportions in 2014 when tens of thousands of women and children from Honduras, Guatemala, and El Salvador migrated to the United States. Many of the children had no parent/legal guardian available to provide care or physical custody and quickly overwhelmed local border patrols.

The provisions of H.R. 7311, William Wilberforce Trafficking Victims Protection Reauthorization Act of 2008, signed into law by George W. Bush give substantial rights and protection to unaccompanied children from countries which do not have a common border with the United States. This made expeditious deportation of the large number of children from Central America difficult and expensive, prompting a call by President Barack Obama for an emergency appropriation of nearly $4 billion and resulted in discussions on how to interpret or revise the 2008 law in order to expedite handling large numbers of unaccompanied children.

== Provisions of the bill ==
This summary is based largely on the summary provided by the Congressional Research Service, a public domain source.

The Emergency Supplemental Appropriations Act, 2014 would appropriate supplemental funds for FY2014 to specified federal agencies and programs to respond to the increased apprehensions of unaccompanied minors along the southwestern border, fight wildfires, and support Israel's Iron Dome anti-missile defense system.

The bill would provide appropriations for the United States Department of Justice (DOJ); the United States Department of Homeland Security (DHS), including U.S. Customs and Border Protection (CBP) and U.S. Immigration and Customs Enforcement (ICE); the United States Department of Health and Human Services (HHS); and the United States Department of State to cover necessary expenses to respond to the significant rise in unaccompanied children and adults with children at the southwest border.

The bill would provide appropriations for the U.S Department of Agriculture's (USDA's) Forest Service to cover anticipated wildfire suppression funding shortfalls if funds previously provided for wildfire suppression will be exhausted imminently and USDA notifies the appropriations committees of the need for additional funds.

The bill would amend the Balanced Budget and Emergency Deficit Control Act of 1985 to require certain adjustments to discretionary spending limits for FY2015-FY2021 for wildfire suppression operations in the wildland fire management accounts at the United States Department of the Interior and the USDA.

The bill would provide appropriations for the Department of Defense (DOD) to assist the government of Israel with procurement of the Iron Dome defense system to counter short-range rocket threats.

The bill would designate funding provided in the Act as an emergency requirement pursuant to the Balanced Budget And Emergency Deficit Control Act of 1985.

The bill would specify authorized, restricted, and prohibited uses of appropriated funds.

== Procedural history ==
The Emergency Supplemental Appropriations Act, 2014 was introduced into the United States Senate on July 23, 2014 by Senator Barbara Mikulski (D-MD).

On July 28, 2014, President Barack Obama released a statement of administration policy in support of the bill, urging "Congress to act swiftly to pass the bill to allow a timely and effective response to these pressing needs."

== Debate and discussion ==
On July 9, 2014 a hearing on the crisis was held by the United States Senate Committee on Homeland Security and Governmental Affairs. The testimony of Statement of Craig Fugate Administrator, Federal Emergency Management Agency U.S. Department of Homeland Security was that "We are talking about large numbers of children, without their parents, who have arrived at our border—hungry, thirsty, exhausted, scared and vulnerable." Senator Dianne Feinstein compared the crisis to the American refusal to accept Jewish refugees from Nazi Germany aboard the MS St. Louis. The President's request for additional funds was met in both houses of Congress by proposals to modify or eliminate the rights granted by the 2008 reauthorization of the Victims of Trafficking and Violence Protection Act of 2000

A 2014 Mother Jones article suggests many of these unaccompanied children are attempting to escape abusive situations. Analysis of Border Patrol statistics shows a correlation between gang-related killing of children in Central America, particularly San Pedro Sula in Honduras, and the surge in migration.

The bill would provide $2.7 billion in supplemental funding, about $1 billion less than the $3.7 billion requested by President Obama. President Obama supported the bill anyway, despite the lower funding amount. According to the administration, "this bill responsibly addresses the humanitarian situation without injecting partisan provisions that are unworkable and would increase costs without solving the problem." The Administration compared this bill favorably with the House bill "Making supplemental appropriations for the fiscal year ending September 30, 2014 (H.R. 5230; 113th Congress)".

== See also ==
- List of bills in the 113th United States Congress
