= European exceptionalism =

European exceptionalism may refer to:

- a description of European dominance in 18th and 19th century history, see European miracle
- ideological attempts to account for this dominance, see Eurocentrism

== See also ==
- Exceptionalism
- Pan-European nationalism
