= Los Angeles Latino International Film Festival =

The Los Angeles Latino International Film Festival (LALIFF) includes feature films, documentaries, and short films from the Latin American diaspora. The six-day festival was established in 1997. The festival was founded by Marlene Dermer (a native of Peru) and Edward James Olmos.

The 13th year of the festival in 2009 included 75 films such as a screening of Spanish director's Pedro Almodóvar's Broken Embraces at Grauman's Chinese Theatre. Almodóvar received the festival's Gabi lifetime Achievement Award. Other films screened at the 2009 even included Josh Crook's La Soga from Santiago in the Dominican Republic, Down for Life about a Latino gang leader in Los Angeles, Santos by Nicholas Lopez Salvador, Sebastian Gutierrez's Women in Trouble from Venezuela and the documentary La Vida Lova about gang war in El Salvador (where the movie's French director Christian Poveda was murdered). The festival is also trying to expand opportunities for young filmmakers. Short films play a substantial role at the festival, allowing lower cost entries to take part.

The Academy Film Archive houses the Los Angeles Latino International Film Festival Collection.
