= Playboys (gang) =

Mexican-American street gang

West Side Playboys
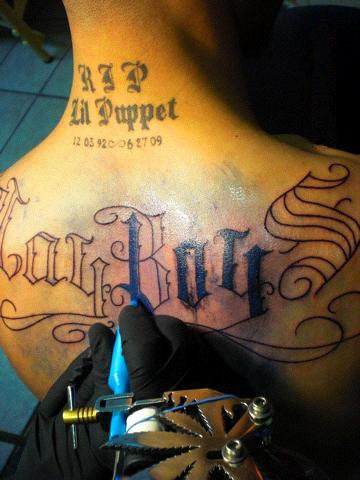
- Playboys 13 tattoo
- Founded: Mid-1950s
- Founding location: West Los Angeles (Pico Union Area). Then started clicks in South Central, Bell Gardens, South Gate, Palmdale, San Bernardino County and Orange County Garden Grove California, United States.
- Years active: 1950s–present
- Territory: Los Angeles County Washington, , Utah, Oregon, Pennsylvania , Mexico, Nebraska & Texas
- Ethnicity: Mexican American African American
- Membership (est.): approximately 6500
- Activities: Drug trafficking, assault, robbery, extortion, arms trafficking, theft, murder, racketeering, illegal immigration, illegal gambling, and fraud, kidnapping
- Allies: Aryan Brotherhood Primera Flats
- Rivals: 18th Street gang 38th Street gang Venice Shoreline Crips Florencia 13 and MS-13

Playboys 13 Gang, also known by the acronym PBS13, is an American street gang founded in Los Angeles County, California and extends to areas in South Central Los Angeles and Orange County, California. The gang also goes by the Spanish term "Conejo" which means "rabbit" or Rabbit gang to identify itself. They align themselves with the prison gang known as La EME or the Mexican Mafia. Because of their affiliation with La EME, while in prison, they set aside their rivalry with other Southern California gang members known as Sureños.

== History ==
The Playboys began on the corner of Pico Boulevard and Fedora Street in Los Angeles County, in the mid 1950s. They were originally a car club that went by the name, "Southern California, Latin Playboys Car Club." When the gang was established, it was divided into 5 sub-groups or cliques. The oldest of the cliques is referred to as "Malos" "MLS" which means Bad. Then the cliques "Chicos Locos" "CLS", Bunny Gangster" "BGS", "Dukes" "DKS", and the all female clique "Crystal Bunnies" "CBS" were formed. It is believed that members from the Playboys Malos moved to South Central Los Angeles in the early 70's and started the East side Playboys 49th street clique. Members from the East Side then moved to the Bell Gardens and South Gate area where they formed the South Side Playboys "Enanos" "ENS" in the 1980's. Since then, members have moved to different parts of Los Angeles County like Burbank, North Hollywood and other cities in the San Fernando Valley. The Orange County Playboys started when members from the Pico and Fedora area met up with members of a party crew in Garden Grove, Orange County in the 90's. In the beginning the gang was predominantly Hispanic, but in recent years, even though it is rare, other ethnic groups have been able to gain membership making them multiethnic. However, the Playboys remain predominantly Hispanic in all their cliques in Latin America and the United States.

Originating in the 1990s in Santa Ana and Garden Grove, the Orange County Playboys have established a presence and garnered respect both within and outside of prison over the years. Two factions of the family initiated this group in Orange County, one being the Silvas, who are all relatives.

The individuals identified in these accounts as among the original members of the Orange County Playboys include:

Israel Silva

Augustin Vargas Silva

Emmanuel Silva

Edgar Silva

Jose Silva

Luis Silva

Chris Silva

Initially focused on socializing and engaging in conflicts with rival gangs, rumors suggest that the Playboys may have been formed by two gangs in Santa Ana, although this theory remains unconfirmed. Despite efforts by law enforcement to dismantle the organization, the Playboys continue to grow in size, with an approximate 360 active gang members solely within Orange County.

== Location ==
The original Westside Playboys gang is still active in West Los Angeles, California despite a gang injunction against them. They have also had sightings in the Antelope Valley area in Southern California Their main territory is the area around the intersection of Pico Boulevard and Fedora Street in L.A.'s Olympic Division. Various other Playboys cliques have been established due to migration of members from Southern California to various other States.Orange County PLAYBOYS Yakima, Washington has one of the largest South Side Playboy Barrios outside of California. Recent reports place the Playboys Gang as far east as Memphis, Tennessee. The Westside Playboys have cliques in Burbank, North Hollywood, Palmdale, Canoga Park and Lancaster, California, while the Southside Playboys have cliques in Ensenada, Mexico; Eugene and Portland, Oregon; and Tacoma, Washington. The Eastside Playboys stick mainly to their original territory with a clique in Fresno, California.

== Culture ==
Although the Playboys are a Sureño gang and use the number 13 to show allegiance to the Mexican Mafia, they are rivals with most other Sureno gangs. The general thinking among Playboy gang members is that all other gangs are their enemy. The most identifiable tattoo all Playboys gang members and cliques use is the playboy bunny. They also use the playboy bunny logo in most of their graffiti with PBS around the head. The colors that are primarily used by the different subgroups of this gang are blue, but some of the gang's subgroups have taken other colors to identify themselves and give them their own unique individualism. The female subgroup known as the pink bunny clicka used the color pink and blue to represent themselves. However, many subgroups, like the pink bunny clicka, became inactive in the late 1990s. The Playboys, like many other Hispanic gangs, have a very strong sense of territory and family. In recent years the Playboys have been using the internet and various social networking sites to keep in contact with one another around the country.

== Criminal activity ==
The Playboys main revenue source is selling marijuana on Fedora and Normandie and at New Hampshire and Pico, Fedora and Pico. They also engage in murder, drive-by shootings, assaults and arms trafficking, but most of their criminal activity is around the sale of marijuana. All other cliques outside of Los Angeles engage mostly the street level distribution of narcotics as their main source of revenue. However, they are still heavily engaged in other criminal acts. In Washington State there has been a lot of media coverage regarding a 2011 shooting at a car show in Kent, Washington that involved Southside Playboy members. There was another incident in Eugene Oregon that made headlines where Southside Playboys members are facing a multitude of charges, as well as a shooting incident in the Portland area of Oregon that resulted in the death of an innocent man. Like most other street gangs, the Playboys also engage in vast amounts of graffiti throughout their neighborhoods. Breaking the gang has been difficult for police departments because there is no direct leadership and each of the gang's cliques operate totally autonomous of each other.
