= Sigifredo Ochoa =

Salvadoran military officer (1942–2023)

Deputy of the Legislative Assembly of El Salvador
- In office 1 May 2012 – 30 April 2015

Ambassador of El Salvador to Honduras
- In office 2005–2009
- President: Antonio Saca; Mauricio Funes

Personal details
- Born: Sigifredo Ochoa Pérez; 2 April 1942 El Salvador
- Died: 6 January 2023 (aged 80) San Juan Opico, El Salvador
- Party: Nationalist Republican Alliance
- Other political affiliations: Salvadoran Democracy
- Occupation: Military officer, politician

Military service
- Allegiance: El Salvador
- Branch/service: Salvadoran Army
- Rank: Colonel
- Battles/wars: Salvadoran Civil War

Sigifredo Ochoa Pérez (2 April 1942 – 6 January 2023) was a Salvadoran military officer and politician who commanded Death Squads during the Salvadoran Civil War.

== Biography ==
Sigifredo Ochoa Pérez was born in El Salvador on 2 April 1942. He was a colonel in the Salvadoran Army during the Salvadoran Civil War. According to declassified documents from the Central Intelligence Agency (CIA), Ochoa allegedly was a commanding officer of the El Calabozo massacre which killed over 200 people in 1982.

He was also accused of leading the Santa Cruz massacre the year prior, including by Philippe Bourgois.

As a member of the right-wing Nationalist Republican Alliance (ARENA), Ochoa served as El Salvador's ambassador to Honduras under President Antonio Saca from 2005 to 2009. Ochoa was dismissed from his position by President Mauricio Funes after he accepted an award from the Honduran government which deposed President Manuel Zelaya, which Funes' government did not recognize at the time. He later served as a deputy of the Legislative Assembly from 2012 to 2015. He later left the party and joined Salvadoran Democracy (DS).

In June 2022, he was sentenced to 8 years imprisonment for misappropriating US$41,040 while being an ambassador.

Ochoa died in a traffic accident in San Juan Opico on 6 January 2023, at the age of 80.
