= Blockade of San Marcos =

Blockade in El Salvador

- Part of the Salvadoran gang crackdown
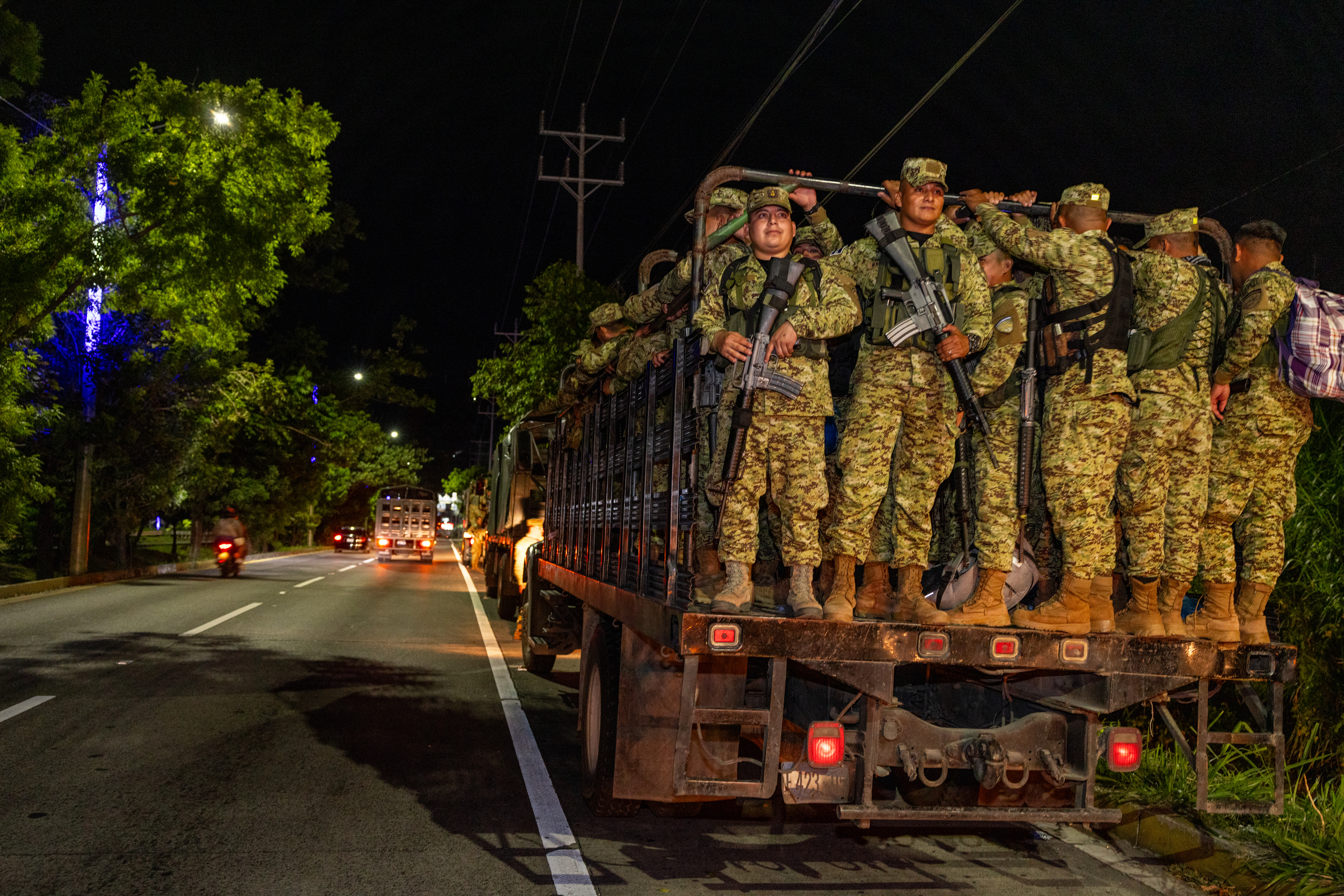
- Date: 28 October 2024
- Location: San Marcos, El Salvador

Parties
Salvadoran government: Salvadoran Army; National Civil Police	Criminal gangs: Mara Salvatrucha; 18th Street gang

Lead figures
Nayib Bukele	

Number
2,000 soldiers 500 police officers	

Casualties
- Arrested: Unknown

The blockade of San Marcos is an operation by the Salvadoran government to arrest members of the criminal gangs of the Mara Salvatrucha (MS-13) and Mara Barrio 18 in the district of San Marcos. The operation began on October 28, 2024, when the Salvadoran President Nayib Bukele announced that 2,500 members of the country's security forces surrounded the community.

== Background history ==
On March 27, 2022, the government of El Salvador, chaired by Nayib Bukele since June 1, 2019, declared a state of national emergency after recording a significant increase in homicides. Between March 25 and 27, 87 murders were reported, which represented the highest number of violent deaths in a weekend since the Salvadoran civil war ended in 1992.

The increase of violence was attributed to the actions of the two main gangs that operate in El Salvador: the Mara Salvatrucha (MS-13) and Barrio 18 gang. Both criminal groups emerged in the 1980s in Salvadoran immigrant communities in the United States and expanded throughout the national territory after the signing of the Peace Accords in 1992.

By 2022, it is estimated that the two gangs would have a total of 70,000 members. Since the beginning of the regime of exception in March, until July 25, 2023, the authorities arrested more than 71,776 people linked to the MS-13 and Barrio 18 gangs.

== Operation ==
The Intelligence Center of the National Civil Police (PNC) of El Salvador identified, through investigative work, the presence of alleged members of criminal structures in the 10 de Octubre neighborhood, located in the district of San Marcos, department of San Salvador. In response to this intelligence information, the authorities deployed a large-scale operation that involved 2,000 members of the Armed Forces of El Salvador Fuerza armada de El Salvador (FAES) and 500 PNC agents.

This operation, which is part of the Territorial Control Plan, had as its main objective the identification, location and capture of members of criminal organizations that, according to intelligence reports, maintained a presence in said residential area.
