= State of exception (disambiguation) =

State of Exception may mean:

- State of exception, a legal theory about transcending the rule of law for the public good
- State of Exception (2005), a book written by Giorgio Agamben describing the above theory

== See also ==
- State of emergency, a related concept
- Exceptionalism, a political philosophy concept
