= 2014 American immigration crisis =

Surge in immigration along U.S. southern border

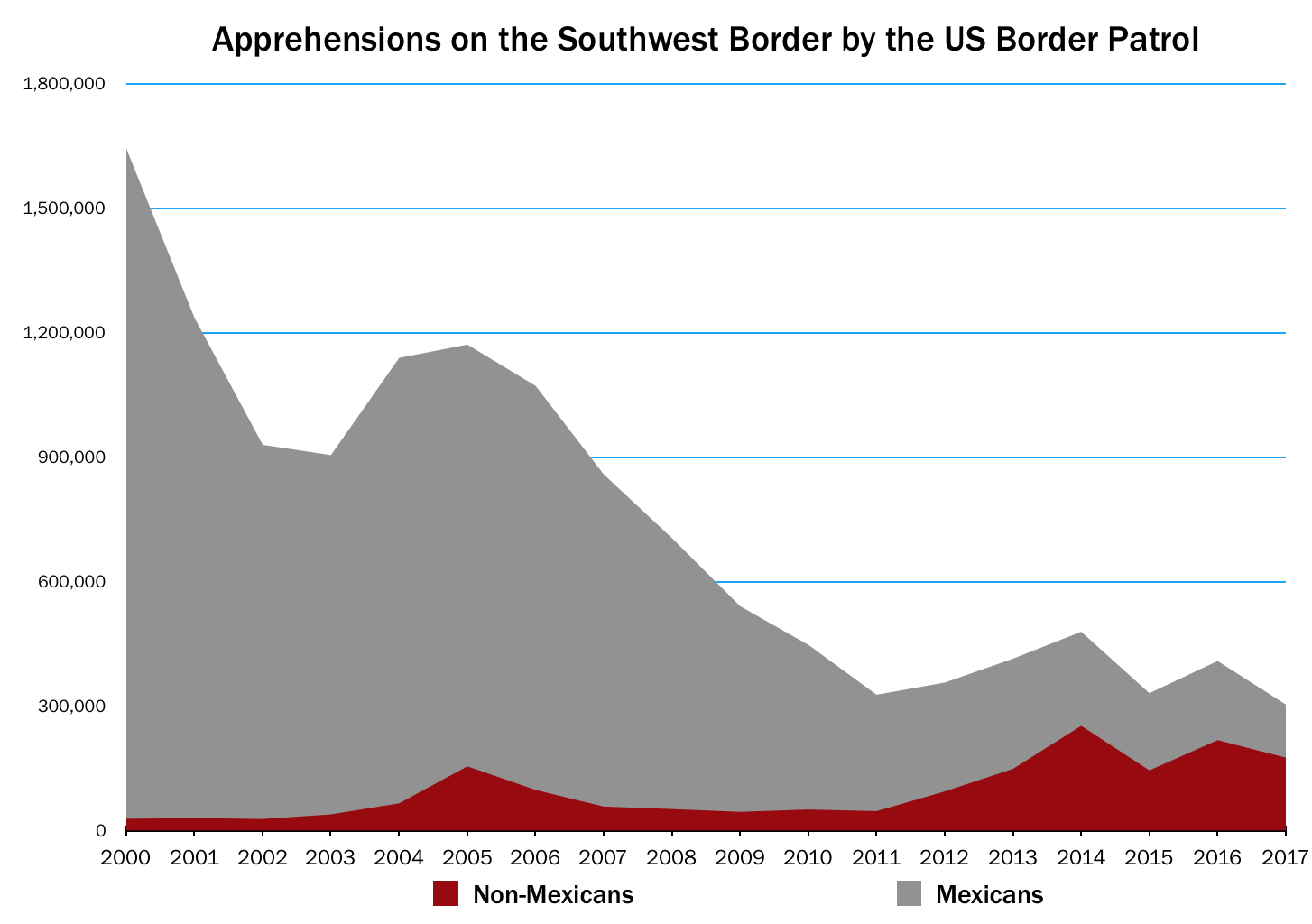
Chart illustrating the number of people apprehended by the U.S. Border Patrol on the U.S.–Mexican border who are, and are not Mexican nationals, from 2000 to 2017. Non-Mexicans arriving on the border are overwhelmingly Central American nationals.

The 2014 American immigration crisis was a surge in unaccompanied children and women from the Northern Triangle of Central America (NTCA) seeking entrance to the United States in 2014. According to U.S. law, an unaccompanied alien child refers to a person under 18 years of age, who has no lawful immigration status in the U.S., and who does not have a legal guardian to provide physical custody and care.

Between 2013 and 2014, the number of unaccompanied children apprehended at the border increased nearly 80%, from 38,759 in fiscal year 2013 to 68,541 in fiscal year 2014. This influx in unaccompanied minor children has been attributed to a number of factors including the high rates of gang-related violent crime in the Northern Triangle; the promulgation of false "permiso" rumors by smugglers; a growing awareness of H.R.7311 (110th), a 2008 law that granted substantial protections from removal to unaccompanied children from countries that do not share a border with the US; and a recovering U.S. economy and labor market following the Great Recession. Many of the children had no parent/legal guardian available to provide care or physical custody and quickly overwhelmed local border patrols.

== Background ==
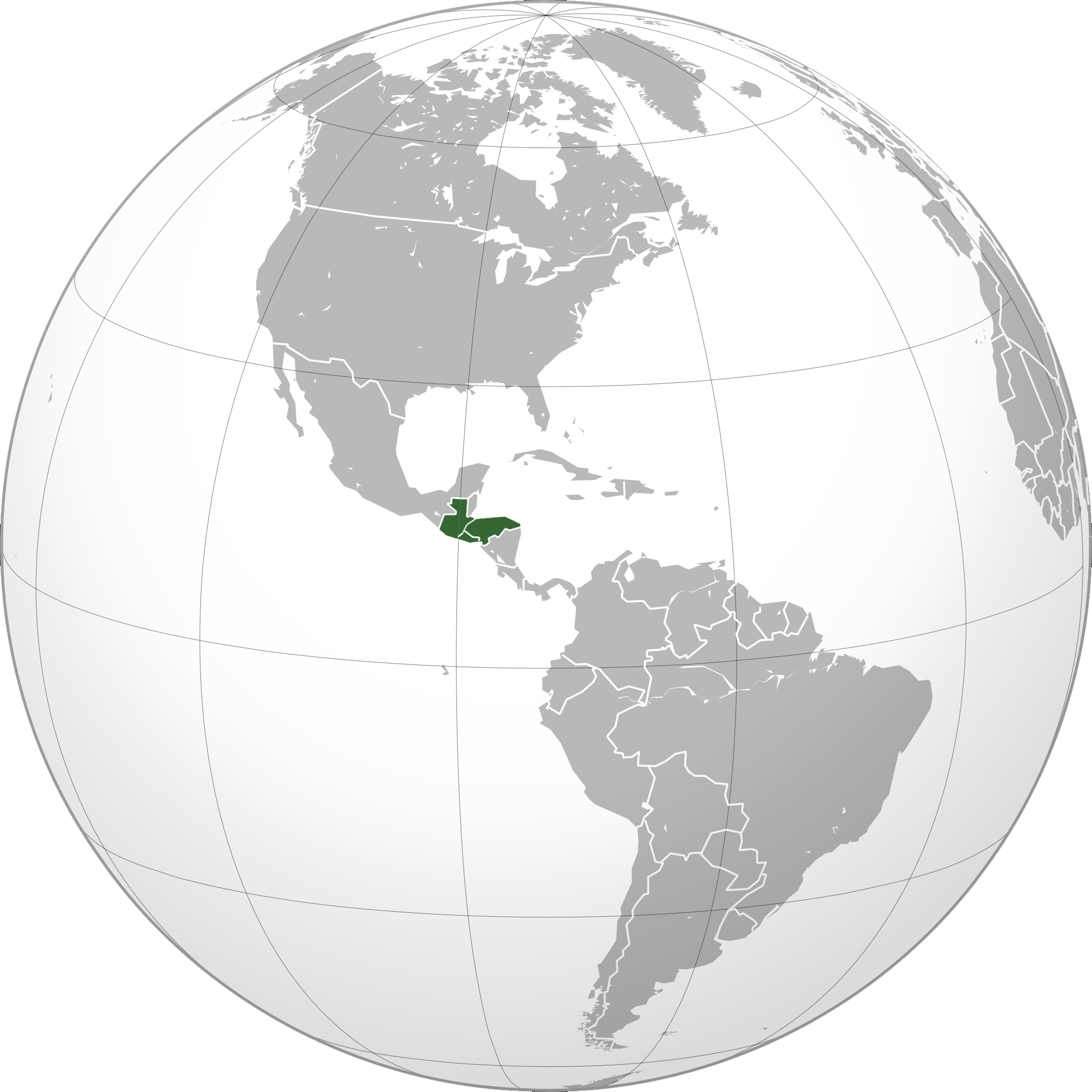
The Northern Triangle is composed of these three countries that had the most children leave in 2014: Honduras, Guatemala, and El Salvador.

Central America's Northern Triangle or the Northern Triangle of Central America (Sp: Triangulo Norte De Centroamerica) is a region in Central America composed of three countries which are Guatemala, El Salvador and Honduras. These countries share a trijunction tripoint border area and are characterized with sharing similar original classical Central American culture, history, society and politics

From 1980 onwards, the number of immigrants from Central America arriving to the United States has grown substantially. However, most of the people fleeing Central America are those whose countries are plagued by corruption, poverty, and murder. The three countries from Central America with the highest numbers of migrants are Honduras, Guatemala, and El Salvador. Other immigrants from different countries in Central America have seen a moderate decrease from 2010 to 2013. For example, Costa Rica, Nicaragua, Panama, and Belize have not had as many immigrants as the other three leading countries in the time frame. The three leading countries are the bulk immigrants coming to the United States. Honduras, El Salvador, and Guatemala make up 85 percent of those who arrive to the United States since the 1980s. "In fiscal year (FY) 2016 alone, U.S. Customs and Border Protection (CBP) intercepted nearly 46,900 unaccompanied children and more than 70,400 family units from El Salvador, Guatemala, and Honduras arriving at the U.S.-Mexico border."

During the Cold War, the United States backed violent anti-Communist forces throughout Latin America. Academics claim that the violence and high murder rates in many of these countries is the direct legacy of the U.S. intervention on behalf of these anti-Communist forces stretching back into the 1950s with the Guatemalan coup d'état, which has shaped the contemporary refugee crisis.

In 2014, the reason this crisis was internationally covered by media outlets, was due to the fact that most of the immigrants were children. Most of these children cross through the Guatemala-Mexico border. Most of these children also ride with other migrants atop a train called "La Bestia" (The Beast), which begins near the Guatemalan border, in Chiapas state, and goes to Mexico City. However, La Bestia has drawn international attention. This train route is the epicenter of mass extortion, mutilation, murder, robberies, rape, kidnapping, and sexual assault of Central American and other immigrants. Immigrants do not report these crimes in fear of being deported back to their native countries. If these immigrant children managed to survive La Bestia and the cartels in Mexico, they now need to find "coyotes" to smuggle them across the Mexican-American border.

Most women and children from Central America simply crossed the Rio Grande and turned themselves in to the United States Border Patrol, relying on the belief, partly well founded, that United States immigration and refugee law made special provision for children. The large number of migrants entitled to hearings, counsel, and placement overwhelmed U.S. immigration courts and other government facilities.

== Causes ==
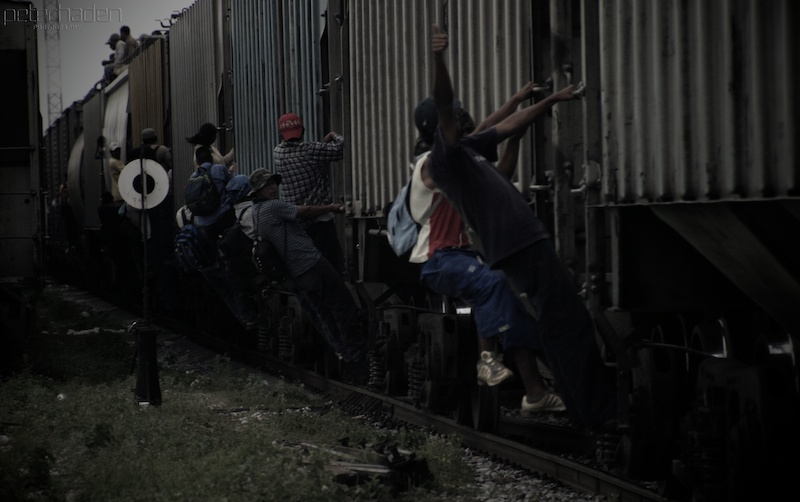
Immigrants jumping on "La Bestia" that will take them to the Mexican-American border

=== Synopsis ===
The 2014 uptick in immigration was largely due to a surge in arrivals of Unaccompanied Minor Children (UAC's), predominately from Guatemala, Honduras, and El Salvador (the Northern Triangle of Central America). Between 2013 and 2014, the number of unaccompanied children apprehended at the border increased nearly 80%, from 38,759 in fiscal year 2013 to 68,541 in fiscal year 2014. This influx in unaccompanied minor children has been attributed to a number of factors including the high rates of gang-related violent crime in the Northern Triangle; the promulgation of false "permiso" rumors by smugglers; the growing awareness of H.R.7311 (110th), a 2008 law that granted substantial protections from removal to unaccompanied children from countries that do not share a border with the US; and a recovering U.S. economy and labor market following the Great Recession.

=== Societal Causes ===
In a United Nations High Commissioner for Refugees study of approximately 400 unaccompanied children from Mexico and Central America, 58 percent of UAC's reported being motivated by safety concerns back home, a nearly 450% increase over the 13 percent of Mexican children that reported similar motivations in a 2006 study. Beginning in the early 2000s, the Northern Triangle countries of Honduras, Guatemala, and El Salvador experienced an increase in violent crime that would continue for the next decade. Although the homicide rates in all three countries had been on the decline since 2011, the murder rates El Salvador and Honduras remained among the highest in the world. In early 2014, El Salvador experienced another uptick in violence after a gang truce between MS-13 and Barrio 18 began to collapse.

Many of the unaccompanied children reported being under the false impression that the Obama Administration was granting permits ("permisos") to children with family members in the US, as long as they arrived by June 2014. It was later determined that these rumors, along with similar rumors about permisos for women who arrived with children, were being promulgated by human smugglers. While the rumors were false, there were in fact a number of policies in place that offered protection from removal to unaccompanied children from Central America.

For women, as crime increased in the last decade, sexual assault and rape have become a prevalent issue in the Northern Triangle as well. In 2014, 40 percent of the people fleeing were women compared to a low 27 percent in recent times. The United Nations Special Rapporteur on Violence Against Women showed that in July 2014, the violent death of women in Honduras shot up at an alarming rate of 263% from 2005 to 2013, fueling the migration of women. In 2013, 95% of the cases of these women go unsolved and women leaving Honduras also face the same risks on their journey.

Organized crime and drug-related violence in these countries have also increased danger for their citizens. Since the 1980s, Colombian smugglers have used Central America, specifically Honduras, as a corridor to the United States. Children in schools are forced to smuggle drugs. Drug trafficking has taken over these countries! as waves of gangsters were deported from the United States in the 90s. Gangs like MS-13 have grown in size and power. Young children are the most vulnerable as gangsters will offer the choice of working for them or leaving. The presence of Mexican cartels has been a feature of illegal drug trade in Guatemala, where law enforcement presence is sparse and there is plenty of open land where planes smuggling cocaine can easily land. In the Northern Triangle (Honduras, Guatemala, El Salvador), studies have shown that 19 out of 20 murders will not result in prosecution.

In addition to violence and crime, food shortages and malnutrition continue to plague the region. It is estimated that half of Guatemalan children are chronically malnourished, resulting in stunted growth and eventually death. While these countries have some of the greatest potential for economic growth, inequality and general incompetency by the government has left these issues either underserved or unaddressed completely.

=== Governmental Causes ===
To start the asylum process, an immigrant child must fill out and apply at their consulate with a N-400 form to apply for naturalization, which includes a processing fee and civics test. After completing processing interviews to determine priority designation, a child undergoing American naturalization must complete form DS-260 in order to apply for an immigrant visa and/or alien registration. By the time the naturalization process has been completed it will have taken on average 18–24 months, though in the last 5 years this has been brought down to an average of 10.2 months.

The William Wilberforce Trafficking Victims Protection Reauthorization Act, a 2008 law intended to protect victims of human trafficking, prevented the immediate deportation of unaccompanied children from Central America. In addition to requiring that the government provide each child with legal representation and hold hearings on their case, the law also requires that children be released to family members or cared for by the Office of Refugee Resettlement in the "least restrictive" accommodations possible while their case winds through the courts. The large backlog of cases meant many children would wait several years before receiving their first hearing, and many more before their cases were fully adjudicated, during which they would be allowed to remain in the United States. The understanding that they would be allowed to remain in the U.S. indefinitely prompted more children to follow. It has also been suggested that some of the new arrivals incorrectly believed that they would be allowed to apply for DACA, a 2012 policy that offers protection from deportation for certain undocumented immigrants who were brought to the U.S. as children.

== Response ==
=== From the government ===
On June 26, 2014, Obama said that parents from Central America shouldn't send their children, with his reasoning being that they could be victims of human trafficking or injure themselves while making the journey. On July 9, 2014, a hearing on the crisis was held by the U.S. Senate Committee on Homeland Security and Governmental Affairs. Craig Fugate, the Administrator of the Federal Emergency Management Agency in the U.S. Department of Homeland Security, testified, "We are talking about large numbers of children, without their parents, who have arrived at our border—hungry, thirsty, exhausted, scared and vulnerable". Senator Dianne Feinstein compared the crisis to the American refusal to accept Jewish refugees from Nazi Germany aboard the MS St. Louis. President Obama's request for additional funds was met in both houses of Congress by proposals to modify or eliminate the rights granted by the 2008 reauthorization of the Victims of Trafficking and Violence Protection Act of 2000.

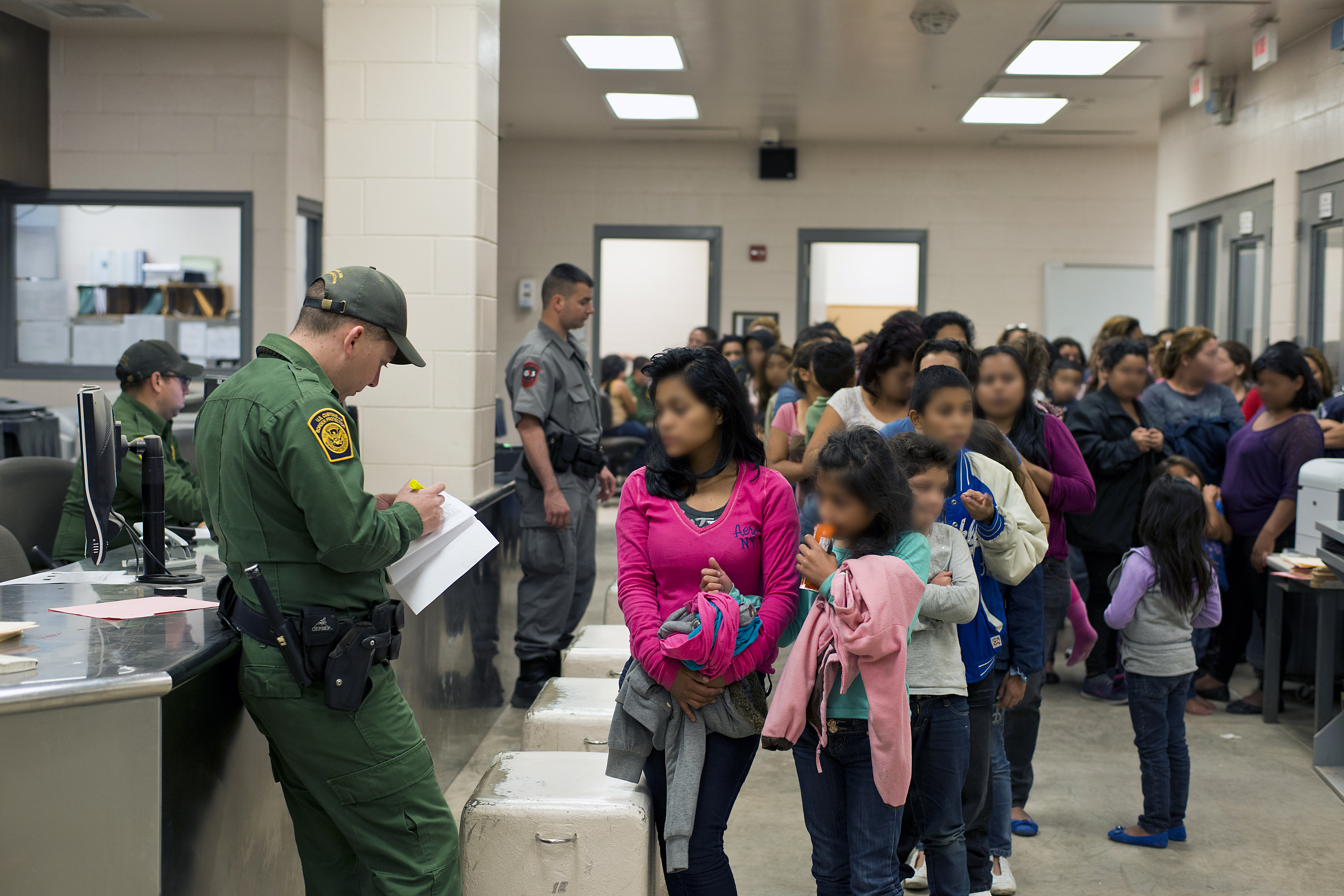
CBP Processing Unaccompanied Children on the South Texas Border in 2014

As most unaccompanied children from Central America do not attempt to avoid capture but turn themselves into the Border Patrol after entering the United States, they usually cross the Rio Grande into Texas. The large number of children overwhelmed facilities in Texas in summer 2014 and some of the women and children were transferred to INS facilities in California. In most instances this occurred without incident, but in Murrieta, California, on July 1, 2014, buses carrying immigrants to a Border Patrol facility were blocked by flag-waving protesters. On July 15, 2014, in Oracle, Arizona, pro and con demonstrators faced off regarding possible use of a local facility to house immigrant children. The location of the shelters being used is confidential, but a local law enforcement officer had informed the community of the planned use of the facility.

The U.S. Department of Justice reported in June 2014 that it will provide around 100 lawyers and paralegals for the rising number of children coming to the United States without parents or relatives. Under this program, the federal government will issue $2 million in grants to compensate lawyers and paralegals representing unaccompanied children. Attorney General Eric Holder stated, "We're taking a historic step to strengthen our justice system and protect the rights of the most vulnerable members of society". The Obama administration estimated roughly 60,000 unaccompanied children would come across the border to the United States in 2014.

On July 18, 2014, Massachusetts Governor Deval Patrick offered one of two locations to the federal government as temporary shelters for up to 1,000 children. One was Camp Edwards, in Bourne on Cape Cod; the other was Westover Air Reserve Base in Chicopee. Governor Patrick explained, "Before a facility opens here, the Commonwealth will sign an MOU with the federal government to ensure that a municipality hosting the facility has input on the circumstances of being a host location."

On July 23, 2014, Senator Barbara Mikulski introduced the bill Emergency Supplemental Appropriations Act, 2014 (S. 2648; 113th Congress), a bill that would appropriate supplemental funds for FY2014 to specified federal agencies and programs to respond to the increased apprehensions of unaccompanied minors along the southwestern border, fight wildfires, and support Israel's Iron Dome anti-missile defense system. The bill would provide $2.7 billion in supplemental funding. On July 28, 2014, President Barack Obama released a statement of administration policy in support of the bill, urging "Congress to act swiftly to pass the bill to allow a timely and effective response to these pressing needs."

On July 29, 2014, Rep. Hal Rogers introduced the bill "Making supplemental appropriations for the fiscal year ending September 30, 2014 (H.R. 5230; 113th Congress)" (also known as the "Secure the Southwest Border Supplemental Appropriations Act, 2014" and the "Secure the Southwest Border Act of 2014") into the United States House of Representatives. H.R. 5230 would provide supplemental FY2014 appropriations to several federal agencies for expenses related to the rise in unaccompanied alien children and alien adults accompanied by an alien minor at the southwest border. The bill would also change the procedures for screening and processing unaccompanied alien children who arrive at the border from certain countries. H.R. 5230 would provide $659 million in supplemental funding. On July 30, 2014, President Barack Obama released a statement of administration policy stating that "his senior advisors would recommend he veto the bill" if it were presented to him for his signature. The House was scheduled to vote on the bill on July 31, 2014, but the Republican leadership canceled the vote because it did not have enough votes to pass H.R. 5230 at that time.

The Department of Health and Human Services had opened three temporary shelters for children at military bases in Texas, Oklahoma, and California, but the sites were closed in August 2014 as the flow of migrant children declined and the capacity of permanent centers to house children was expanded. However, the new centers, such as the one in Artesia, New Mexico, may not offer facilities compatible with due process. After a lawsuit was filed by the ACLU about conditions at Artesia conditions there showed marked improvement.

In January 2014 the Department of Homeland Security sought a contractor to manage and transport approximately 65,000 Unaccompanied Alien Children (UAC) "ages infant to 17 years of age". The Department of Health and Human Services stated in its "Budget in Brief" that the expected annual number of arriving UAC had increased from 6,560 to an estimated 60,000 for fiscal year 2014, and the Government anticipated awarding a five-year contract to deal with them.

In October 2014, immigrant rights groups filed Freedom of Information Act ("FOIA") litigation to compel the release of documents regarding the use of the expedited removal process against families with children, including those detained at the family detention center in Artesia, New Mexico. The complaint was filed in the U.S. District Court for the Southern District of New York.

The provisions of H.R. 7311, William Wilberforce Trafficking Victims Protection Reauthorization Act of 2008, signed into law by George W. Bush give substantial rights and protection to unaccompanied children from countries which do not have a common border with the United States. This made expeditious deportation of the large number of children from Central America difficult and expensive, prompting a call by President Barack Obama for an emergency appropriation of nearly $4 billion and resulted in discussions on how to interpret or revise the 2008 law in order to expedite handling large numbers of unaccompanied children.

In November 2017, the Trump administration ended the Central American Minors Program which allowed eligible minors from the Northern Triangle to apply for the refugee resettlement or parole in the United States, thereby limiting the flow of Central Americans to the United States.

=== U.S. Strategy for Engagement in Central America ===
While the U.S. had numerous domestic policies for dealing with the massive rise in immigration, on July 8, 2014 President Obama also requested funding for "the repatriation and reintegration of migrants to countries in Central America and to address the root causes of migration from these countries." This announcement was the start of a long term U.S. plan to address three "areas of action": security, governance, and prosperity. Congress has so far granted $1.4 billion contingent on these Central American countries meeting security, corruption, and human rights requirements to receive assistance. When funding was first appropriated for these countries, funding was split fairly evenly between addressing economic and civil concerns and "rule of law" concerns regarding police and judicial institutions. So far none of these countries have met all of the legislative requirements to receive all of the funding allotted to them.

In a statement made on the inauguration of Jimmy Morales as the President of Guatemala, the Obama administration addressed certain criteria that the Northern Triangle countries (Honduras, El Salvador, Guatemala) would be expected to uphold in order to receive assistance from the United States. These criteria were: Combat corruption and strengthen public institutions, improve civilian jurisdiction and counter activities of criminal organizations, protect human rights, support programs to promote equitable growth, implement effective civil society consultations, and increase government revenues. These criteria have reflected long-standing obstacles for prosperity in these countries, particularly those relating to equality, human rights, and collecting government revenues needed to fund police.

While funding for these efforts has been fairly consistent the past two years, the FY2018 budget proposed by President Trump would cut aid to these countries by roughly 30%. It is hard to know what the full implications of this cut to funding would be, but experts have claimed that it would most likely result in backsliding of any progress made in the governance of these countries.

=== Detention centers ===
Unaccompanied minors held by Immigration and Customs Enforcement

Detention centers were reported overcrowding in the summer of 2014. One cause of the influx of immigrants with children was word of mouth in Central America that families with children were not detained due to lack of facilities. Detention centers with facilities for families with children were built in Artesia, New Mexico, a temporary site that closed in December 2014; one in Dilley, Texas, that is managed by Corrections Corporation of America and located across 50 acres with a capacity of 2,400 migrants; Karnes City, Texas, with a capacity of 530 people; and a small facility in Berks County, Pennsylvania. The facility in Dilley includes barrack-style housing, a school, a medical clinic, and other facilities. However, migrants in the detention centers were refused bond in order to deter other migrants. In February 2015, a federal court, in a case under appeal, forbade use of deterrence of others as a consideration in refusing bond. Jeh Johnson, Secretary of Homeland Security issued new regulations easing requirements for bonding out reducing the average stay in the facility to 22 days, and some detainees who have been detained 6 months or longer have been released. Johnson believes maintaining some capacity to detain families is necessary to maintain deterrence.

=== From the public ===
Members of the Congressional Hispanic Caucus called for humane measures with respect to families and children fleeing violence in Central America and continued efforts to refine administrative policy with respect to the millions of undocumented immigrants living and working in the United States.

A 2014 Mother Jones article suggested that many of the unaccompanied children were attempting to escape abusive situations. Analysis of Border Patrol statistics by the Director of the Regional Security Policy Program at the Washington Office on Latin America shows a correlation between gang-related killing of children in Central America, particularly San Pedro Sula in Honduras, and the surge in migration.

According to the Immigrant Rights' Project of the American Civil Liberties Union, the Office of Refugee Resettlement (ORR) within the United States Department of Health and Human Services, the United States Department of Homeland Security (DHS), including U.S. Customs and Border Protection (CBP), and the Executive Office for Immigration Review (EOIR),(usually called the immigration courts), within the United States Department of Justice each have statutory responsibilities with respect to unaccompanied children from Central America.

The ACLU believes the stipulated settlement in Flores v. Meese, which is a United States District Court for the Central District of California decision which sets out a nationwide policy concerning federal detention of any minor, also applies.

=== From migrants' home countries ===
While acknowledging suggestions that immigration reform may have helped prompt the influx of child migrants, the Obama administration has also focused attention on measures to be taken by the migrants' home countries to try to stop the flow. In July 2014, President Obama met with the presidents of Guatemala, El Salvador, and Honduras to seek their cooperation in reducing migration of children and expediting returns. In the summer of 2014, Mexico took actions to keep migrants from using freight trains ("La Bestia") to travel through Mexico. As of February 2015, the number of unaccompanied minors apprehended at the U.S. border, 12,509, during the previous 5 months had dropped while the number deported by Mexico to their home countries, 3,819, had risen by 56% year on year from the same period in fiscal year 2014. Conditions in Honduras had improved with a drop of about 20% in the homicide rate from 2012 to 2014.

=== From migrants ===
Since the placement of restrictions on illegal immigration through policies pursued by the Trump administration, the movement of people from Central America to the United States has shifted to Mexico. The role of Mexico as a transit country between the Northern Triangle and the United States has transformed since the 2016 Presidential election with more people applying for asylum in Mexico than in the U.S. According to a Reuters report, "Mexican asylum data and testimony from migrants in Tenosique suggest that although fewer Central Americans are trying to enter the United States, plenty are still fleeing their poor, violent home countries, with many deciding to stay longer in Mexico, which has traditionally been a transit country."

== Aftermath ==
After the 2014 immigration crisis in America, the influx of immigrants from Central America to the United States continued but in lower proportions. Over the early 2010s America and Mexico presented consistent pushback to all immigrants from Central America. America and Mexico both also showed no immediate immigration policy changes even with the crisis. The United States and Mexico have militarized borders and dissuaded immigrants from making the journey as of 2014.

Central American families and children kept coming to borders seeking asylum. In the aftermath, the U.S. Immigration and Customs Enforcement (ICE) and the Customs and Border Protection (CBP) detention of Central American people in the Mexican-American borders increased over 100 percent from late 2015 to early 2016 compared the year before. Also, United States government ordered for the deportation in 7,700 in 2014 to 2015 without court hearings. There were 62,000 children still awaiting legal proceedings after 2014. In most cases, 94 percent of these children do not have attorneys to represent them in court. People from the Northern Triangle continued to immigrate despite the militarization of the CBP, increase in deportations, and the dangerous journey because their homes remain unsafe.

=== Settlement in the United States ===
Grants of Asylum in the United States by country
Country	FY 2014	FY2015	FY2016
El Salvador	183	1,860	1,404
Guatemala	311	1,700	1,317
Honduras	89	1,099	885
Source: DHS, 2016 Yearbook of Immigration Statistics, Table 17.

During the 2011-2015 period, most migrants from Central America settled in California, followed by Texas and Florida. According to data from the U.S. Census Bureau, "In the 2011-15 period, the top four counties with Central American immigrants were Los Angeles County in California, Harris County in Texas, Miami-Dade County in Florida, and Prince George's County in Maryland", which comprise approximately 30% percent of the total Central American immigrant population in the United States for this period. According to U.S. Census data from 2010, out of the top 10 cities where Guatemalan Americans reside in the United States, three cities fall in California: Los Angeles, San Francisco/Oakland/Fremont, and Riverside/San Bernardino/Ontario. Salvadoran Americans in the United States were in the highest concentrations in Los Angeles, Houston and New York in 2010, with 7 out of the top 25 cities with Salvadoran Americans falling in California. In 2011, Honduran Americans in the United States were populated in the highest proportions in Florida, Texas, and New York.

After arriving in the United States, these migrants fall into the legal category of undocumented aliens, which puts them at the risk of deportation. Deportation to their home country poses further problems for Central Americans, as the NCTA countries are not prepared to deal with their return due to inadequacies in the physical and political infrastructure.

== Resources ==
Kids in Need of Defense (KIND) provides free legal aid to unaccompanied minors in immigration proceedings across the U.S. KIND was founded in October 2008 by Angelina Jolie in a collaboration with the Microsoft Corporation and 25 leading U.S. law firms.

In addition to smaller organizations focused on assisting Central Americans in the United States, broader international organizations such as UNICEF, International Rescue Committee, Amnesty International also provide advocacy and support for Central Americans migrating to the U.S.

== Other issues ==
=== Scamming of relatives ===
On July 23, 2013, The New York Times reported that con artists had fraudulently obtained confidential information about child immigrants held at military bases in Oklahoma and Texas and had been contacting the children's parents asking for money to facilitate release of the children and reunification with their family. No money is actually required. The matter was reported to be under investigation by the FBI.

=== Trafficking and abuse of migrant children resettled by federal officials ===
In July 2015, a federal indictment revealed a forced-labor ring operating on an egg farm near Marion, Ohio, in which teenagers from Guatemala were being lured with promises of education and then forced to work 12-hour days, six or seven days a week. The teens lived in squalid trailers, were denied their paychecks and threatened with death if they sought help. At least half a dozen of the teenagers found working on the farm had been in the custody of the U.S. Department of Health and Human Services' (HHS) Office of Refugee Resettlement, which is charged with the processing, treatment, and placement of unaccompanied migrant children pending the resolution of immigration proceedings. Government officials placed the teens with human traffickers who posed as relatives and friends. Concerns that the Ohio case was indicative of larger, systemic problems led to a Senate inquiry into how human traffickers successfully exploited the federal resettlement processes.

The results of the Senate Permanent Subcommittee on Investigations' probe were released on January 26, 2016. Led by Sen. Rob Portman (R-OH) and Sen. Claire McCaskill (D-MO), the committee found that preventable mistakes were made in the Ohio case. HHS officials failed to run background checks on the sponsors and any secondary caregivers in the households, site visits to the sponsors' homes were not conducted, and in one instance a sponsor was permitted to prevent a child-welfare case worker from visiting with one of the victims. System-wide, the Senate inquiry found similar, serious gaps including weak processes for verifying relationships between children and sponsors, failure to perform background checks, lack of home visits and home studies, and the placement of children without meeting sponsors in person. Other key deficiencies in HHS policies and procedures were an inability to detect when a sponsor is seeking custody of multiple unrelated children and allowing sponsors to deny HHS from providing post-release services to children and barring contact between HHS care providers and the children.

Ultimately, the inquiry concluded that the policies for placing unaccompanied minors exposed them to a risk of trafficking and other abuse at the hands of government-approved sponsors. The Subcommittee identified more than 10 other cases of post-placement trafficking beyond the Ohio case and 15 additional cases with "serious trafficking indicators." It is unclear how many other unaccompanied minors, placed by HHS, have been victims of trafficking or other abuses. HHS maintains no standardized mechanism of tracking trafficking or abuse cases. However, the findings of the Senate investigation echoed results of an independent investigation by the Associated Press (AP) in which the AP found more than two dozen children who had been placed with sponsors and subjected to sexual abuse, starvation, labor trafficking, or severe abuse and neglect.

On January 25, 2016, the AP reported that in response to surges in the number of unaccompanied minors arriving in the U.S. in the past three years, government officials weakened safety standards related to the transfer of children from government shelters into sponsors' homes and the vetting of sponsors. Specifically, the government stopped fingerprinting most adults seeking to claim the children. In April 2014, the Office of Refugee Resettlement also stopped requiring original copies of birth certificates to prove the identity of most sponsors and later it decided not to complete forms that request sponsors' personal and identifying information before sending many of the children to sponsors' homes.

Although the number of unaccompanied youth arriving from Central America declined significantly in 2015, with a 49% drop in the first 8 months of the year when compared to that same period in 2014, the number of young migrants is again on the rise. HHS officials stated that they are strengthening their policies and procedures for placing children and have signed a contract to open more shelters; however, they remain under pressure from the Senate Subcommittee and advocates to both account for documented failings and address their causes.

=== Refugees vs. immigrants terminology ===
In the discussion on the influx of Central Americans into the United States the terms "refugee" and "immigrant" have been used interchangeably or synonymously to represent Central Americans entering the country, despite the different legal ramifications of the two terms. The difference in the usage of these terms comes from the different perspectives on the factors motivating movement to the United States, with "push" factors being associated with the terminology of "refugee" and "pull" factors being associated with the terminology of "immigrant". According to Karen Musalo and Eunice Lee,

For those adopting the "push" factor outlook, the crisis is humanitarian one, reflecting human rights violations and deprivations in the region, and the protection needs of refugees (UNHCR 2015b; UNHCR 2014; Musalo et al. 2015) While acknowledging that reasons for migration may be mixed, this view recognizes the seriousness of regional refugee protection needs. For those focusing on "pull" factors, the crisis has its roots in border enforcement policies that were perceived as lax by potential migrants, and that thereby acted as an inducement to migration (Harding 2014; Navarette, Jr. 2014)

== See also ==
- Central American migrant caravans
- Sin Nombre (2009 film)
- Nicaraguan exceptionalism
