= Santa Cruz massacre (El Salvador) =

1981 massacre during the Salvadoran civil war

- Part of Salvadoran Civil War
- Location: 13°57′N 88°38′W; Victoria, Cabañas
- Date: November 11–19, 1981
- Weapons: Mortar and firearms
- Perpetrator: Armed Forces of El Salvador

The Santa Cruz massacre was an eight-day massacre in November 1981 that killed dozens of civilians at Victoria, in the Cabañas Department of El Salvador. It took place during the Salvadoran Civil War.

During the massacre, the Armed Forces of El Salvador killed civilians as they deployed scorched earth tactics during an anti-guerilla military action.

== Background ==
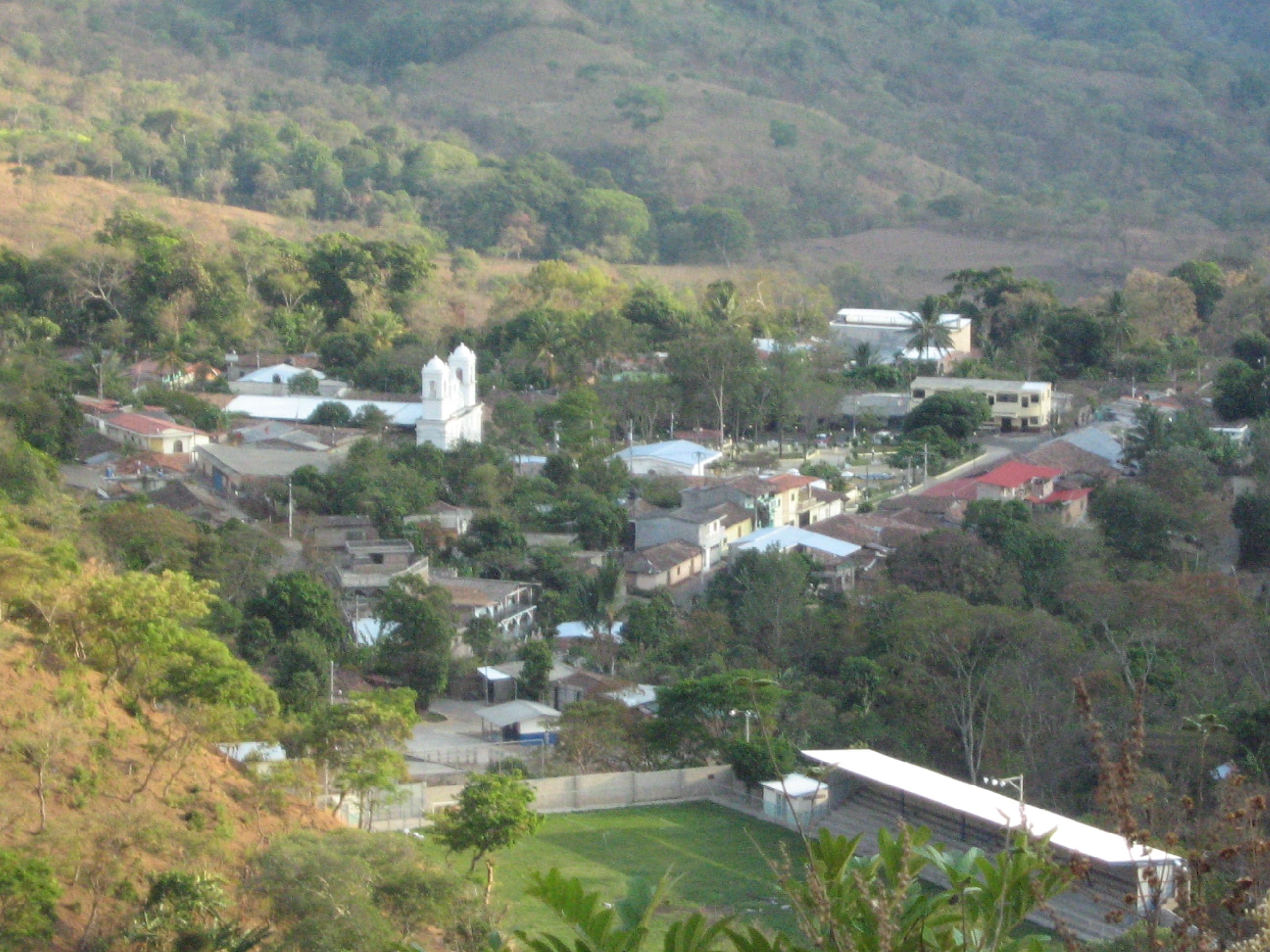
Central Victoria in 2010

People living in the Victoria municipality of the Cabañas Department of El Salvador lived under government oppression during the 1970s, prompting the formation of community associations. The associations became the target of abuse and murder by the El Salvadoran military. The repression accelerated support for the National Resistance Armed Forces and the Farabundo Martí Popular Liberation Forces guerrilla groups.

== March 1981 ==
To combat the guerrilla movements, the government armed forces deployed scorched earth tactics, starting on March 15, 1981, allegedly killing civilians, destruction of housing, animals and crops. To escape the violence, communities hid in the forest or in caves, and some attempted to flee to Honduras by crossing the Lempa River. Many were shot by both Salvadoran and Honduran forces from aircraft as they swam across the river. The United Nations Truth Commission for El Salvador attributed between 20 and 30 deaths to the river crossing, attributing some deaths to gunfire and some to drowning. A further 189 people disappeared.

== Massacre ==
On October 15, 1981, the Puente de Oro bridge over the Lempa River was destroyed with explosives by guerrillas and the military received intelligence that they planned to destroy a dam on the river. Responding to the intelligence, the armed forces launched attacks on six villages in the Victoria municipality: San Jerónimo, San Felipe, La Pinte, Peña Blanca, Santa Marta, Celaque y Jocotillo. 1,200 soldiers, led by Sigifredo Ochoa Pérez (1943–2023), according to witness Philippe Bourgois. The attacks began on November 11 and included gun and mortar fire combined with bombings, killing an unknown number of civilians, at least dozens, possibly one hundred.

== Aftermath ==
In March 2015, online magazine El Faro published findings from an investigation into the massacre. El Faro published their evidence of Sigifredo Ochoa Pérez's leadership of the massacre. Ochoa Pérez has not been found guilty of any crime and was permitted by the magazine to publish a reply to the report. His reply, according to an opinion piece by Joel Simon Executive Director of the Columbia Journalism Review "did not substantively challenge the facts".

On October 2, 2015, the University of Washington's Center for Human Rights launched litigation against the Central Intelligence Agency, accusing the agency of withholding information about the massacre. The centre had previously submitted a request for information, citing the United States Freedom of Information Act. A few days after the litigation filing, the offices of the centre were robbed and hard drives containing testimonies about the massacre were stolen.

== See also ==
- El Calabozo massacre
- History of El Salvador
- List of massacres in El Salvador
