= Christian Poveda =

Hispanic-French photojournalist and film director

- Born: Christian Gregorio Poveda Ruiz; January 12, 1957; Algeria
- Died: September 2, 2009 (aged 52); Tonacatepeque, El Salvador
- Cause of death: Ballistic trauma
- Occupations: Film director Photojournalist
- Known for: Murder victim

Christian Gregorio Poveda Ruiz (January 12, 1957 – September 2, 2009), known as Christian Poveda, was a Hispanic-French photojournalist and film director. He covered the world's conflict zones for more than 30 years. Poveda's documentary film La Vida Loca (2008) is about two rival gangs in El Salvador.

== Life ==
Born to exiled Spanish parents in Algeria, he went to France with his family in 1961/2.

== La Vida Loca ==
La Vida Loca (The Crazy Life, 2008) is a documentary filmed by Poveda in El Salvador about the life of local gangs.

For 16 months Poveda filmed the marginal young people of El Salvador divided between two rival gangs, the Mara Salvatrucha and the 18th Street gang.

The hand-held camera focuses on daily life in a base cell of one of the gigantic maras, the la Campanera X-18 clique, composed of fifty engaging adolescents and young adults with an average age of 16 to 18.

The documentary was presented in the San Sebastián International Film Festival in September 2008.

== Death ==
Poveda was shot to death in Tonacatepeque, El Salvador on September 2, 2009; probably by a member of a mara. He was 52 years old.

It is alleged that certain police and gang members were unhappy with Poveda's documentary. He had promised his subjects that La Vida Loca would not be released in El Salvador, but he was powerless to prevent pirated copies from being sold. In 2011, ten gang members and a former police officer were convicted and sent to prison for Poveda's death.

French Foreign Minister Bernard Kouchner praised Poveda's work, calling him "a respected journalist, a professional who never hesitated to take great risks in the name of freedom of information." Salvadoran Public Safety Minister Manuel Melgar said Poveda's killing was a "repugnant and reproachable criminal act".

== See also ==
- List of unsolved murders (2000–present)
