= 38th Street gang =

Hispanic-American street gang

38th Street Gang
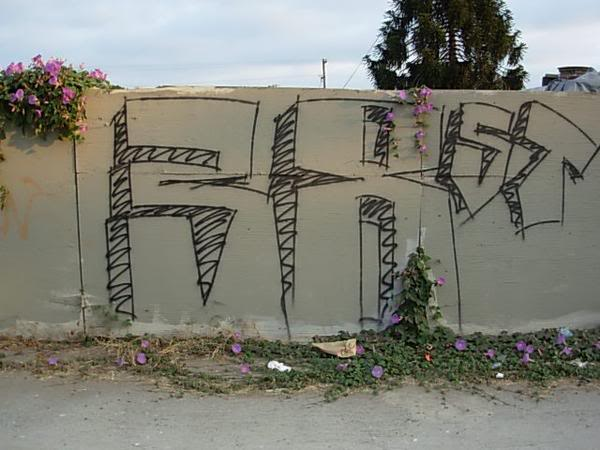
- 38th Street graffiti, 2011
- Founded: Unknown exact date, most accepted early 1920s
- Founding location: Los Angeles, California, United States
- Years active: Early 1920s–present
- Territory: Primarily Los Angeles and Magna, Utah
- Ethnicity: Mexican American
- Activities: Drug trafficking, assault, robbery, extortion, arms trafficking, theft, murder, racketeering, illegal immigration, illegal gambling, kidnapping, witness intimidation and fraud
- Allies: Mexican Mafia; Sureños; Street Saints 13; 18th Street gang Lennox 13
- Rivals: Bloods; Florencia 13; Playboys

The 38th Street Gang is an American criminal street gang in Los Angeles, California, composed mainly of Mexican-Americans. The 38th Street Gang is one of the oldest street gangs in Los Angeles and has been occupying its territory since the 1920s. They engage in many criminal activities. The Mexican Mafia controls and routinely uses 38th Street gang members to carry out their orders.

== History ==
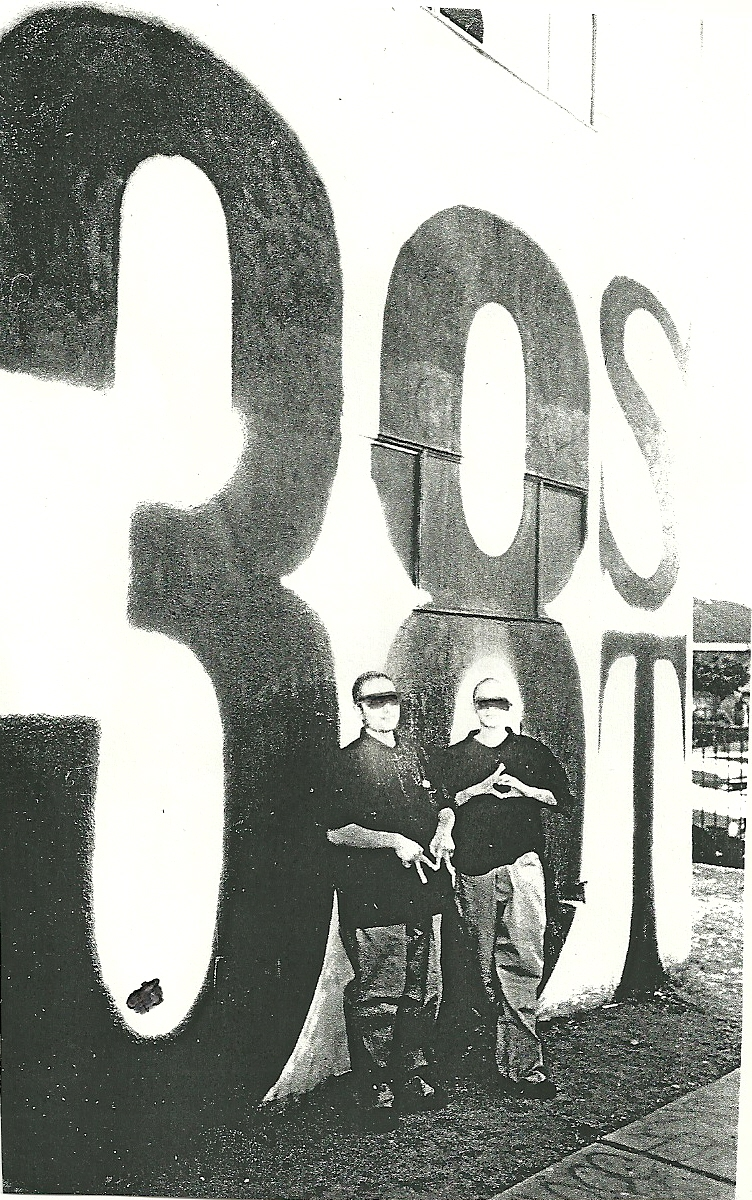
Two members of the 38th Street Gang, c. 1993.

Founded in the 1920s, the 38th Street Gang dates back to the pachucos and zoot suits and was formed at the border between South Central and the city of Vernon. The 38th Street Gang became well known in the 1940s in the Sleepy Lagoon murder trial. Sleepy Lagoon was a popular swimming hole in what is now East Los Angeles. A Mexican American juvenile named Jose Diaz was killed there in 1942, and members of the 38th Street Mexican American gang were arrested and charged with murder by the Los Angeles Police Department.

All five of the gang members were convicted and sentenced to prison. These convictions ultimately united the Mexican community and changed Mexican gangs. The jail sentences also acted as a glue to unite the Mexican and Mexican American community in a common cause, a fight against class distinction based on prejudice and racism, a fight against the establishment. In prison, 38th Street Gang members were held in high esteem. On October 4, 1943, the convictions of the gang members were overturned and the gang members were allegedly welcomed back to their communities as heroes.

During the Sleepy Lagoon trial, the media exaggerated the headlines about the gang that wore zoot suits and created wartime hysteria and prejudice against the Mexican-American community. In what was known as the Zoot Suit Riots in May to June 1943, many Mexican-American zoot suiters from the segregated parts of town were attacked by white servicemen and residents of Los Angeles. Cloth was being rationed as part of the war effort, and the white servicemen and residents felt zoot suiters were wasting valuable resources by dressing so flamboyantly. Los Angeles police officers did nothing to halt the angry mobs from rioting, arresting the zoot suiters instead of the attackers. As a result of the riots, the United States Department of War banned all military personnel from going to Los Angeles on leave. The Los Angeles City Council adopted a resolution that banned the wearing of zoot suits on Los Angeles streets, although no ordinance was approved by the City Council nor signed into law by the Mayor. 38th Street is often credited for starting a new style of dress: during the time the Sleepy Lagoon defendants were incarcerated, their prison-issue clothes were deliberately oversized, with the intention of drawing ridicule from Anglo inmates and prison staff. However, the Sleepy Lagoon defendants maintained their clothing well, cleaning and ironing it.

== Location ==
The 38th Street gang occupies a huge area on the east side of South Los Angeles and some areas in East Los Angeles. These neighborhoods had been historically known to be some of the most dangerous in the nation. Their rivalries expand to most neighborhoods all over Los Angeles County. They also have confirmed cliques in Salt Lake City, West Valley City, Magna, and Kearns in Utah, and in Wisconsin and Chicago.

== Criminal activities ==
Since the 1920s, the 38th Street Gang has gained a reputation as one of California's most violent street gangs. Members conduct various activities, including drug sales, murder, theft and vandalism. In the late 1980s and early 1990s, the city closed many of its roads in the 38th Street vicinity due to high volume of people coming to purchase narcotics in the area. City administrators hoped that the blocked streets would deter non-residents from purchasing narcotics. By the late 1990s, a federal task force was set up in order to investigate the gang's involvement in the illegal drug trade; this resulted in the arrest of several of its members. The authorities confiscated thousands of dollars in drugs and money, as reported by the Los Angeles Times and local news channels. The group has historically quarreled with various rival gangs for placement and competition, which has resulted in many drive-by shootings and deaths. On August 24, 2004, a preliminary injunction by law enforcement prohibited active members of the 38th Street Gang from using firearms, alcohol, graffiti and other dangerous materials in public. Today, the 38th Street Gang relies almost exclusively on narcotics sales and distribution as its only source of revenue. The gang also holds a loose alliance with the 18th Street Gang due to common rivals, mainly in South Los Angeles.

In February 2011, the FBI arrested 37 suspects connected to 38th Street. They were arrested on narcotics and firearms charges. The 38th Street Gang was the subject of a 130-page grand jury indictment alleging violations of the federal Racketeer Influenced and Corrupt Organizations statute. As many as 53 defendants were charged with violating federal law by acting on behalf of the gang and participating in murders, murder plots, attempted murders, narcotics trafficking, robberies, extortion and witness intimidation. As of 2021, no further information is available as to what happened to the arrested men.

== See also ==
- Gangs in Los Angeles
- History of the Mexican Americans in Los Angeles
