= Vista al Lago massacre =

2016 massacre in El Salvador

- Location: 13°42′02″N 89°05′41″W; Vista al Lago, Ilopango, El Salvador
- Date: 10 October 2016; 10 years ago 11:30 a.m. (CST)
- Target: Soldiers of the Salvadoran Air Force
- Attack type: Homicide, torture, false imprisonment
- Deaths: 4
- Perpetrator: MS-13
- Convicted: 7

The Vista al Lago massacre occurred on 10 October 2016 in Vista al Lago, a neighborhood of the Salvadoran city of Ilopango. Four Salvadoran Air Force soldiers were murdered by gang members of MS-13 after boarding the wrong bus and arriving in the neighborhood. As of 2025, seven gang members have been convicted for their roles in the massacre.

== Massacre ==
On 10 October 2016, four soldiers of the Salvadoran Air Force—Nelson Omar Díaz López, Leónidas Enrique Morales Morán, Wilfredo Pérez López, and Saúl Humberto Turbín Gómez—traveled from Ahuachapán to the Ilopango International Airport to participate in an air force special forces event. In San Salvador, however, they boarded the wrong bus and were dropped off in the Vista a Lago neighborhood of Ilopango. There, they were intercepted by several gang members of MS-13, one of the largest street gangs in El Salvador, who were monitoring who was entering and leaving the neighborhood.

Gang members falsely imprisoned the soldiers and took them to a communal house in the neighborhood where they murdered the soldiers. The Salvadoran government described the murders as having been committed with "extreme barbarism" ("lujo de barbarie"). The soldiers' bodies were then buried near Changallo. The National Civil Police (PNC) found the bodies months later and described them has showing signs of torture.

== Aftermath ==
On 1 December 2022, the Specialized Sentencing Court of El Salvador sentenced Henry Alonso Romero Rosales to 325 years imprisonment and Miguel Antonio Díaz Saravia to 269 years imprisonment for their roles in the massacre and for other homicides they had committed. On 8 December 2025, the 5th Anti-Organized Crime Court of San Salvador sentenced Miguel Ángel "Woody" Barrientos, Bismarck Eliseo Medrano Ayala, José Alberto "Black" Mejía Clímaco, José David "Macaco" Rodríguez Ortiz, and Numan Ariel "Maligno" Rodríguez Villanueva to 160 years imprisonment (40 years for each victim) for their roles in the massacre.

== See also ==
- List of massacres in El Salvador
