= Nicaraguan exceptionalism =

Nicaraguan exceptionalism (Spanish: Excepcionalismo Nicaragüense) is a belief that Nicaragua is an exceptional nation, different from its Central American neighbors, despite shared history in the Federal Republic of Central America and regional integration in the Central American Integration System. This concept differs from the exceptionalism of other nations primarily as its basis rests solely upon the actions and institutions implemented since the Sandinista government took power in the 1979 revolution, and again in 2006 after passing power to the National Opposition Union. The difference here is, most nationalist claims to exceptionalism originate from the founding of nations and/or the development of their cultures due to long histories.

The widely regarded exception within the current panorama of dystopian violence afflicting contemporary Central America, Nicaragua is often hailed as "the safest (sano) country in Latin America (despite also being the poorest)". Other exceptionalism claims include the concept that Nicaragua is highly resistant to drug trafficking as compared even to richer neighbors like Costa Rica and Panama. Even Western media have drawn on this notion in reporting on why Nicaraguan children are not migrating to the United States in the 2014 American immigration crisis to flee drug trafficking violence (despite that there is heavy Nicaraguan immigration to neighboring Costa Rica).

It's not no secret. Everybody knows that. The big businesses from here, if there are no drugs around, they cannot sell their articles. So when you see things are good, that means drugs are around.—Bluefields shopkeeper regarding state involvement in drug trade
