= Transnational gangs =

Gangs located in multiple countries

Transnational gangs are gangs that are located in multiple countries. When these gangs commit crimes in one country, their plans for the crime can sometimes be put together in another country. These gangs or mara are able to move around efficiently from one place to another. Transnational gangs are not a normal street gang because they are much larger in size and located in more than one country; they are considered to be able to pose a significant threat for the safety of the countries they are located in.

== Examples ==
=== MS-13 ===
The Mara Salvatrucha, or the MS-13 gang are located in the United States, Canada, Mexico and El Salvador. The Mara Salvatrucha gang was founded in the 1980s in Los Angeles, California. The original members of the Mara Salvatrucha were refugees from El Salvador that came to the United States. The Barrio 18 or the 18th Street Gang is the Mara Salvatrucha's main rivals.

=== 18th Street Gang ===
The 18th Street Gang, also known as the Barrio 18, are located in the United States, Canada, Central America and Mexico. The 18th Street Gang is a youth gang. The gang was founded in 1959 in Los Angeles, California. The 18th Street Gang was originally part of the Clanton 14 Gang, but split in the early 1960s; the gang was originally founded by Mexican Americans. The Mara Salvatucha are considered the 18th Street Gang's enemies.

=== Barrio Azteca ===
The Barrio Azteca are a prison gang that are located in the United States and Mexico. The Barrio Azteca was founded in 1986 in El Paso, Texas. The prison gang was started by Mexican prisoners that were incarcerated in El Paso. The Sinaloa Cartel is one of the Barrio Azteca's major enemies.

=== Hells Angels ===
The Hells Angels are an outlaw motorcycle gang. They are located in the United States, Europe, Canada, Oceania, Africa, Asia, South America and Central America. The gang was founded on March 7, 1948 in Fontana, California and San Bernardino, California. The Hells Angels are considered to be a gang because they fit the definition of a gang; one of the requirements to be considered a gang is to participate in some form of crime. The crimes that the Hells Angels participate in include the transportation, production and distribution of drugs, assault, homicide, motorcycle theft, extortion, money laundering, and sex trafficking.

=== Black Pistons ===
The Black Pistons are an outlaw motorcycle gang. They are located in the United States, Wales, Scotland, Iceland, Australia, England, Norway, Ireland, Belgium, Switzerland, Poland, Germany and Canada. The gang was founded in Germany in 2002 as a support for the Outlaws Motorcycle Club. They are considered a gang because they meet the requirements of a gang, which include committing crimes. The crimes that the Black Pistons commit are theft, assault, intimidation, extortion, fraud and many others.
