= Mejicanos massacre =

2010 attack by Salvadoran gang members

- The burnt minibus the day after the massacre
- Location: 13°43′35.3″N 89°11′14.6″W; Mejicanos, El Salvador
- Date: 20 June 2010; 16 years ago 7:30 – 8:00 p.m. (CST)
- Target: 2 minibuses
- Attack type: Arson, mass shooting
- Deaths: 19
- Injuries: 14 or 15
- Perpetrator: 18th Street gang
- Motive: Revenge for the killing of an 18th Street gang member by MS-13
- Convicted: 5

The Mejicanos massacre (Spanish: masacre de Mejicanos), also known as the Route 47 massacre (masacre de la ruta 47), occurred on 20 June 2010 when members of the 18th Street gang (Barrio 18) attacked two minibuses in the Salvadoran city of Mejicanos, just northeast of the capital city of San Salvador. During the massacre, members of Barrio 18 shot at one minibus and burned a second, killing 19 people in total and injuring 14 or 15 more.

Since the 1990s, the Barrio 18 and MS-13 street gangs committed several crimes in El Salvador contributing to the country having one of the world's highest intentional homicide rates. In June 2010, a member of Barrio 18 was killed by a member of MS-13, one of Barrio 18's rivals. The following day, Barrio 18 committed the Mejicanos massacre in revenge for the killing. Since 2011, several individuals have been charged or convicted for their roles in the Mejicanos massacre. Sentences range from 3 years imprisonment to 410 years imprisonment.

Salvadoran president Mauricio Funes and the National Civil Police described the massacre as a terrorist attack. The Legislative Assembly passed a law cracking down on gangs as a direct response to the massacre. The Mejicanos massacre remains the deadliest attack committed by street gangs in El Salvador.

== Background ==
Beginning in the 1990s, crime committed by street gangs became a major problem in El Salvador after many Salvadoran refugees from the country's civil war began to be deported from the United States. Many of these deported Salvadorans were members of street gangs, most notably Mara Salvatrucha (MS-13) and the 18th Street gang (Barrio 18). Gang violence between MS-13 and Barrio 18 resulted in El Salvador having one of the highest intentional homicide rates in the world. Other crimes committed by Salvadoran street gangs included kidnapping, extortion, and robbery.

== Attack ==
On 19 June 2010, members of MS-13 killed a member of Barrio 18 known as "Crayola" in a shootout and subsequently fled the scene on a minibus operated by bus route 47. The shootout occurred in the Jardín borough of Mejicanos, a city just northeast of the capital city San Salvador. Barrio 18 sought to exert revenge against MS-13 by targeting the same bus route that MS-13 used to flee the scene.

At 7:30 p.m. on 20 June 2010, members of the Barrio 18 Revolucionarios faction shot at a minibus operated by bus route 47 in Mejicanos, killing the driver and a passenger in the process. Around 15 minutes later, another group of Barrios 18 members forced their way onto a different route 47 minibus and forced the driver to drive to the location where "Crayola" was killed. There, gang members shot at the minibus' passengers and then proceeded to douse the minibus' entrance and center hallway with gasoline. The gang members set the bus on fire and shot at any passengers attempting to escape through the windows.

Victims of the attack were transported to the nearby Zacamil Hospital. In total, 19 people died in the Mejicanos massacre; 2 died in the first minibus attack, and 17 died in the second. Of the 17 deaths in the second minibus, 13 people died at the scene and 4 subsequently in hospital in the days following the attack. A further 14 or 15 people were seriously injured. The first minibus attack was committed in order to distract the National Civil Police from the second attack. The Mejicanos massacre remains the deadliest attack committed by street gangs in Salvadoran history.

== Aftermath ==
=== Reactions ===
On 21 June 2010, Salvadoran president Mauricio Funes told journalists that he was shocked by the event, stating "it shocks me, yesterday's event has no comparison with other events... it seems to me an act that seeks to generate terror, it is an act of pure terrorism" ("a mí me estremece, el hecho de ayer no tiene comparación con otros hechos… me parece un acto que busca generar terror, es un acto de terrorismo puro"). The National Civil Police labeled the massacre as a terrorist attack. In a direct response to the Mejicanos massacre, the Legislative Assembly of El Salvador passed the "Law Prohibiting Maras, Gangs, Groups, Associations, and Organizations of Criminal Nature", which was drafted by Funes, on 1 September. Both MS-13 and Barrio 18 organized a public transportation strike in an attempt to force the Legislative Assembly to repeal the law to no avail. The law increased prison sentences for gang members.

=== Prosecution of assailants ===
According to El Faro journalist Carlos Martínez, the attack was not planned by Barrio 18 in whole and was instead spontaneously committed by some of its members. He also reported that some of those who committed the attack were killed by the gang as a punishment for attracting police attention to Barrio 18.

On 21 June 2010, the National Civil Police announced the arrests of eight gang members who were suspected of being involved in the massacre, three of whom were minors. On 8 November 2011, Juan Antonio Borja Alvarado and Éver Alexis Martínez were sentenced to 66 years imprisonment for their role in the massacre. Rafael García Barbero was also sentenced to 3 years imprisonment for being an accessory to the attack. On 27 September 2013, Gustavo Ernesto López Huezo was sentenced to 66 years and 8 months imprisonment for being the massacre's mastermind. He was convicted of aggravated homicide, attempted homicide, and aggravated damage. The court determined that López Huezo was the one responsible for forcing the driver to drive the bus to the site of the massacre, that he was the one that organized the procurement of the gasoline used in the massacre, and that he subsequently murdered the driver with a .38 revolver. "Crayola" was López Huezo's brother-in-law. In March 2016, Carlos Oswaldo Alvarado was sentenced to 410 years imprisonment for his role in setting the minibus on fire. On 9 July 2021, the National Civil Police arrested four more gang members supposedly involved in the Mejicanos massacre. On 29 July 2025, Eduardo Enrique Rosales Mendoza, a Barrio 18 member arrested the day after the massacre who served 15 years imprisonment, was recaptured by the National Civil Police and charged with illicit association because of his involvement in the gang.

=== Similar attacks ===
In February 2011, Barrio 18 committed a similar attack on a bus that killed seven people. Salvadoran authorities believed that this attack was committed in order to prove the gang's worthiness to Los Zetas, a Mexican paramilitary group and drug cartel which was at the time expanding its operations into El Salvador. In April 2019, gang members shot at two minibuses in Mejicanos, injuring 4 people and forcing that bus route to briefly suspend operations.

== See also ==
- List of massacres in El Salvador
