= Florencia 13 =

Mexican-American street gang

- Founded: 1960s
- Founding location: Florence, California, United States
- Years active: 1930s–present
- Territory: South Los Angeles; Hyde Park; Oregon; Colorado; Florida; Washington; Utah; Arizona; Mexico; Canada; Brazil; Germany; Kansas
- Ethnicity: Mexican American
- Membership (est.): 2,000-3,000+
- Activities: Drug trafficking, assault, robbery, extortion, arms trafficking, theft, murder, racketeering, illegal gambling, and fraud
- Allies: Mexican Mafia; Sureños; Pueblo Bishop Bloods; Mad Swan Bloods; Harvard Park Brims; East Coast Crips (Former rivals)
- Rivals: 18th Street gang 38th Street gang Grape Street Watts Crips; Watts Varrio Grape Street 13; Hat Gang Watts Crips; Huntington Park Locos; Playboys; East Side 13; South Los 13

The Florencia 13, also known as South Side Florencia 13, Florence Gang, or F13, is an American criminal street gang based in Los Angeles, California, composed mainly of Mexican Americans. The gang is named after the Florence area of Los Angeles County, controlled by the Mexican Mafia. They are involved in drug-smuggling, murder, assault, and robbery.

== History ==
The Los Angeles County Sheriff’s Department, the DEA, and the ATF began targeting Florencia 13 gang members for their roles in racially motivated attacks on African-Americans. Court testimony and the judges ruling found that F13 members had targeted African-Americans based purely on race. At certain times, Florencia 13 leaders ordered killings of the East Coast Crip gang, according to former Los Angeles County Sheriff Lee Baca. The conflict was triggered by the theft by East Coast Crips of a large amount of drugs from Florencia 13 members, resulting in the Mexican Mafia putting a “green light” out on the East Coast Crips. On January 13, 2019, two people were shot and wounded outside the Fashion Place Mall in Salt Lake City, Utah, after an argument erupted between Florencia 13 and Norteños members. Two male Florencia members, aged 19 and 20, were arrested for involvement in the incident. The two suspects were also charged for a shooting at a group of people at a Taylorsville, Utah cemetery on January 6, which did not harm anyone. On October 6, 2019, four men, ages 20s to 50s, were killed and five injured at KC Tequila, a Hispanic-themed bar and restaurant in Kansas City. It was among the deadliest acts of violence in modern Kansas history. The two gunmen were alleged members of Florencia 13, and are facing murder and attempted murder charges. In February 2024, one of the gunmen, Javier Alatorre, was sentenced to 34 years following a guilty plea to second degree murder. In July 2025, the second gunman, Hugo Villanueva-Morales, was sentenced to life without parole after previously being convicted of capital murder.

== Operation Joker's Wild ==
Operation Joker's Wild investigated the gang's drug trafficking, extortion of street criminals, and racially based murders of African Americans in the area. The operation involved the Los Angeles High- Intensity Drug Trafficking Area Task Force, the DEA, the ATF, the Los Angeles County Sheriff’s Department, U.S. Immigration and Customs Enforcement, the IRS, and the Los Angeles County Probation Department.

In 2007, 102 members of Florencia 13 were listed in indictments, under the operation, leading to the biggest gang raid in American history at the time, with 96 of the 102 members taken into custody. The indictments included charges of drug trafficking, attempted murder, murder, rape and extortion. As of 2009, 94 of the 102 had been convicted or pleaded guilty, 3 had pending trials, 2 had died and 5 were fugitives from justice. The trial further found that the gang was controlled by the Mexican Mafia prison gang.

== In popular culture ==
Between 2005 and 2014 there was a Southern California style Mexican restaurant at 185 Sullivan Street in the Greenwich Village neighborhood of New York City named Florencia 13 after the gang.

The Paragon's 1957 song "Florence" is the official theme song of Florencia 13.
