= Victoria, El Salvador =

Victoria Chocaique
- District
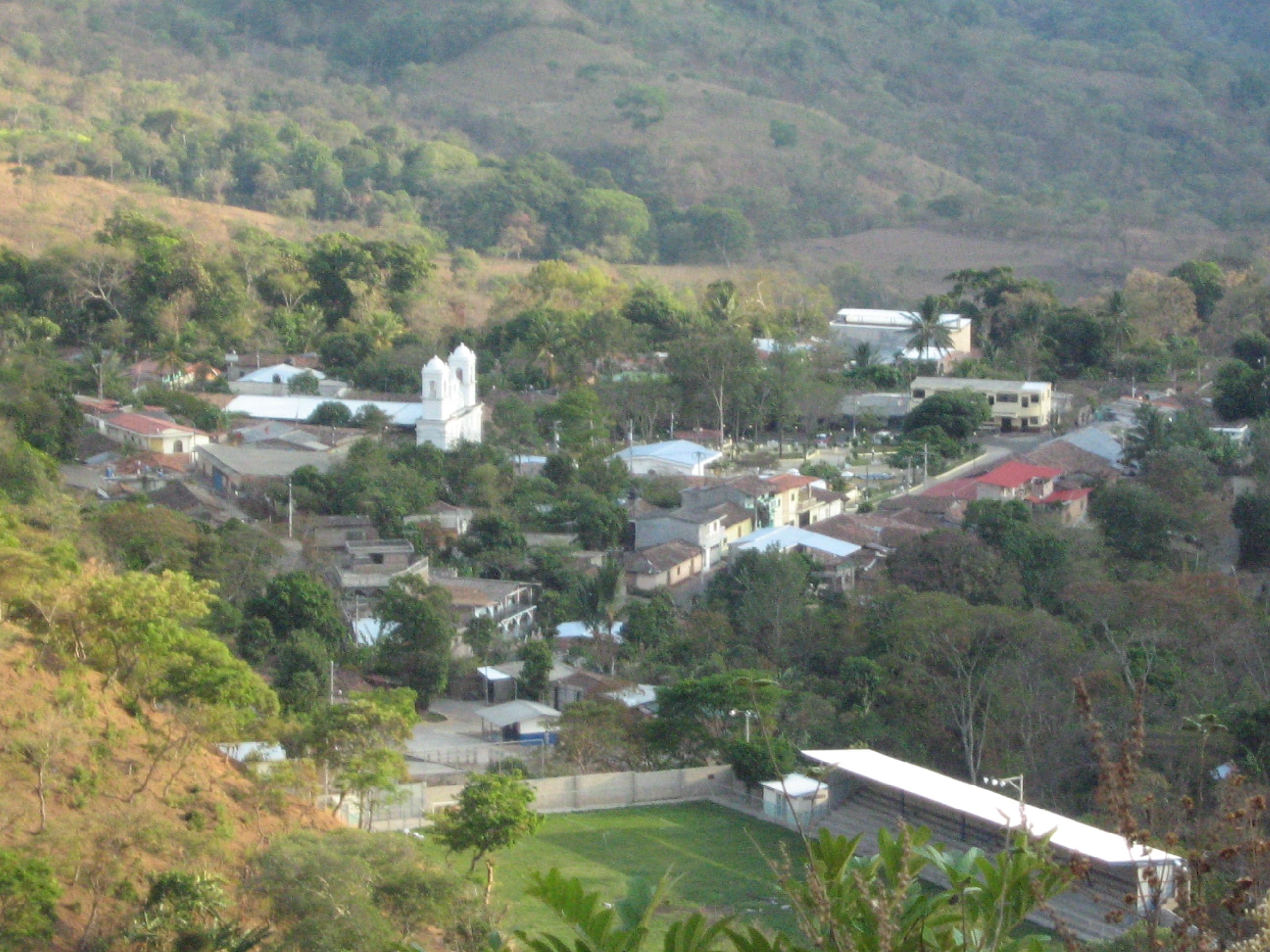

- Victoria (Chocaique) location in Cabañas Department

- Location in El Salvador
- Coordinates: 13°57′N 88°38′W
- Country: El Salvador
- Department: Cabañas
- Municipality: Cabañas Este

Government
  - Mayor: Edgardo Portillo (Nuevas Ideas)
- Elevation: 2,530 ft (771 m)

Population (2024)
  - District: 10,953
  - Rank: 124th in El Salvador
  - Rural: 10,953

Victoria is a district in the Cabañas Department of El Salvador. Ciudad Victoria is home to a community-based radio station, Radio Victoria.

== History ==
In October 1981, an unknown number of civilians were killed in Victoria during the Santa Cruz massacre.
