= Philippe Bourgois =

Professor of anthropology

Philippe Bourgois (born 1956) is professor of anthropology and director of the Center for Social Medicine and Humanities in the Department of Psychiatry at the University of California at Los Angeles. He was the founding chair of the Department of Anthropology, History and Social Medicine at the University of California, San Francisco (1998–2003) and was the Richard Perry University Professor at the University of Pennsylvania (2007–2016).

== Biography ==
His book Righteous Dopefiend was co-authored with Jeff Schonberg and was published in 2009 by the University of California Press in their "Public Anthropology" series. The book won the 2010 Anthony Leeds Prize for Urban Anthropology. Bourgois' previous book was based on five years living with his family next to a crack house in East Harlem during the mid-1980s through the early 1990s: In Search of Respect: Selling Crack in El Barrio. It won the 1996 C. Wright Mills Award and the 1997 Margaret Mead Award among others. He has conducted research in Central America on ethnicity and social unrest and is the author of Ethnicity at Work: Divided Labor on a Central American Banana Plantation (1989) which was based on two years of living in the workers' barracks of a Chiquita Brands banana plantation spanning the borders of Costa Rica and Panama (Haanstad 2001).

Bourgois received a bachelor's degree in social studies from Harvard College in 1978. He was awarded a master's degree in development economics (1980) and a Ph.D. in anthropology (1985) from Stanford University. He spent a year as a postdoctoral fellow at the École Normale Supérieure in Paris in 1985–1986.

In graduate school he worked for the Agrarian Reform ministry in Nicaragua (1980) during the Sandinista revolution and was a human rights activist on Capitol Hill advocating against military aid to the government of El Salvador in 1982.

== Publications ==
In addition to his three ethnographies Bourgois has published five edited volumes, including Violence in War and Peace (2004 Blackwell), co-edited with Nancy Scheper-Hughes and most recently, "Violence at the Urban Margins" (2015 Oxford), co-edited with Javier Auyero and Nancy Scheper-Hughes. He published an ethnographic study of East Harlem crack dealers, In Search of Respect: Selling Crack in El Barrio (Cambridge University Press. 1995). Bourgois is also the author of over 150 academic and popular press articles addressing segregation in the U.S. inner city, homelessness, gender violence, immigration and labor conflict, substance abuse, HIV, and intimate violence. He also published an article on his father's escape from Auschwitz ("Missing the Holocaust").

=== In Search of Respect: Selling Crack in El Barrio ===
Bourgois' ethnographic research of the crack dealers and their families revealed the structural barriers that marginalized the minority group of Puerto Ricans, and how their violent street culture further isolated them from mainstream society.

The violent street culture was necessary for them to gain respect within their own marginalized groups. Many of the drug dealers did, in fact, want to enter the legal workforce, however, they were often subject to prejudice and with their lack of education and gap in employment history when they were selling drugs, they were often rejected or could only get jobs at minimum wage. Many subsequently returned to the drug trade.

=== Righteous Dopefiend ===
Opioid addiction in San Francisco, California is explored by Bourgois and photographer Jeff Schonberg in their 2009 photo-ethnography Righteous Dopefiend wherein the two observe, photograph, and critically analyze a group of homeless heroin addicts from November 1994 through December 2006 (Bourgois 4).

The ethnography takes a humanistic approach to counter action against opioid addiction in the California region by attempting to redefine the perception of opioid addiction and humanize the experiences of addicts by illustrating the presence of inequality, violence, racism, suffering, and complex power relations within the San Francisco drug scene. Bourgois writes: “The central goal of this photo-ethnography… is to clarify the relationship between large-scale power forces and intimate ways of being in order to explain why the United States, the wealthiest nation in the world, has emerged as a pressure cooker for producing destitute addicts embroiled in everyday violence” (Bourgois 5).

== Selected bibliography ==
- — (1989). Ethnicity at Work: Divided Labor on a Central American Banana Plantation (PDF). Johns Hopkins University Press. ISBN 9780801836930.
- —; Flores Salinas, Nilda; Zambrana Villarroel, Eunice; Alcaraz del Castillo, Franklin (1995). Forgotten Children (PDF) (Report). United States Agency for International Development, The Secretariat of Health. 511-0613.
- — (1995). In Search of Respect: Selling Crack in El Barrio. Cambridge University Press. ISBN 9780521017114.
- — (2001). "Culture of Poverty" (PDF). In Smelser, Neil J.; Baltes, Paul B. (eds.). International Encyclopedia of the Social & Behavioral Sciences. Pergamon Press. pp. 11904–11907. doi:10.1016/B978-0-08-097086-8.12048-3. ISBN 9780080430768.
- — (2002). "Understanding Inner City Poverty: Resistance and Self-Destruction Under U.S. Apartheid" (PDF). In MacClancy, Jeremy (ed.). Exotic No More: Anthropology on the Front Lines. University of Chicago Press. pp. 15–32. ISBN 9780226500133.
- Scheper-Hughes, Nancy; Bourgois, Philippe, eds. (2003). Violence in War and Peace: An Anthology. Wiley-Blackwell. ISBN 9780631223498.
- — (2003). "One Hundred Years of United Fruit Company Letters" (PDF). In Striffler, Steve; Moberg, Mark (eds.). Banana Wars: Power, Production and History in the Americas. Duke University Press. pp. 103–144. ISBN 9780822331964.
- —; Schonberg, Jeffrey (2009). Righteous Dopefiend. University of California Press. ISBN 9780520254985.
- — (2010). "Useless Suffering: The War on Homeless Drug Addicts" (PDF). In Gusterson, Hugh; Besteman, Catherine (eds.). The Insecure American: How We Got Here and What We Should Do About It. University of California Press. pp. 238–254. ISBN 9780520259713.
- — (2010). "Recognizing Invisible Violence: A Thirty-Year Ethnographic Retrospective" (PDF). In Rylko-Bauer, Barbara; Whiteford, Linda; Farmer, Paul (eds.). Global Health in Times of Violence. School for Advanced Research Press. pp. 17–40. ISBN 9781934691144.
- Auyero, Javier; Bourgois, Philippe; Scheper-Hughes, Nancy, eds. (2013). Violence at the Urban Margins. Oxford University Press. ISBN 9780190221447.
- — (2019). "The Political and Emotional Economy of Violence in US Inner City Narcotics Markets" (PDF). In Lareau, Annette; Lizardo, Omar; Weininger, Elliot (eds.). Ritual, Emotion, Violence: Studies on the Micro-Sociology of Randall Collins. Routledge. ISBN 9781138614284.
- — (2019). "Teaching Social Medicine as Collaborative Ethnographic Research and Advocacy on Homelessness and Serious Mental Illness" (PDF). In Hansen, Helena; Metzl, Jonathan (eds.). Structural Competency in Mental Health and Medicine: A Case-Based Approach to Treating the Social Determinants of Health. Springer Publishing. pp. 75–85. ISBN 9783030105242.
- — (2021). "The Violence of the American Dream in the Segregated US Inner-City Narcotics Markets of the Puerto Rican Colonial Diaspora" (PDF). In Arias, Enrique Desmond; Grisaffi, Thomas (eds.). Cocaine: From Coca Fields to the Streets. Duke University Press. pp. 254–286. ISBN 9781478014652.

== See also ==
- Banana Wars
- Opioid epidemic in the United States
- Santa Cruz massacre (El Salvador)
