= Exceptionalism =

Belief that a species, group, or era is 'extraordinary'

Exceptionalism is the perception or belief that a species, country, society, institution, movement, individual, or time period is "exceptional" (i.e., unusual or extraordinary). The term carries the implication, whether or not specified, that the referent is superior in some way.

Although the idea appears to have developed with respect to an era, today it is particularly applied with respect to particular nations or regions.

Other uses of the term include medical and genetic exceptionalism.

== History of the phenomenon ==
Exceptionalism can be understood as an asymmetrical form of identity construction that functions via a claimed distinction from others (see also: schismogenesis). In the national context it is profoundly linked to nationalism and can legitimize a certain form of foreign policy. As N. Nymalm and J. Plagemann point out, "[e]xceptionalist discourse expresses a peculiar link between a state’s foreign policy and its self-understanding as a unique society or civilization that is related to some form of higher order revelation or spiritual or otherworldly character." The German romantic philosopher-historians, especially Johann Gottfried Herder (1744–1803) and Johann Gottlieb Fichte (1762–1814), dwelt on the theme of uniqueness in the late 18th century. They de-emphasized the political state and instead emphasized the uniqueness of the Volk, comprising the whole people, their languages, ethnicity and their traditions. Each nation, considered as a cultural entity with its own distinctive history, possessed a "national spirit", or "soul of the people" (in German: Volksgeist). This idea had a strong influence in the growth of nationalism in 19th-century European lands—especially in ones ruled by élites from somewhere else.

Claims of exceptionality have been made for many countries, including the United States, Australia (especially in South Australia), China, France, Germany, Greece, Pakistan, Imperial Japan, Iran, Italy, Serbia, Israel, North Korea, South Africa, Spain, UK, The Nordic countries, the USSR, Thailand and Lebanon. Historians have added many other cases, including historic empires such as China, the Ottoman Empire, ancient Rome, and ancient India, along with a wide range of minor kingdoms in history. The recurrence of this structure of exceptional ingroup and inferior outgroups can be found across space and time and different contexts (both national and other), so that "when we replace the names, the asymmetrical opposition of Hellenes or Romans to the "barbarians" repeats itself structurally across the epochs. The opposition that may be found in church language of "laos" [Greek for people] versus "ethne" [Greek for gentiles] ("populus" / "plebs" versus "gentes" / "pagani") acquires its sense only because it distinguishes Christians from pagans."

American exceptionalism, a term coined by Alexis de Tocqueville in his influential work Democracy in America, describes the belief that the United States is a unique nation tasked to transform the world in its image and it can be traced back to the colonial period. In historiography, the conception that the political development of Germany followed an exceptional path in comparison to other western nations, which in itself constitutes a claim of exceptionality, is debated under the term Sonderweg. The American economist J. Bradford DeLong has used the term "exceptionalism" to describe the economic growth of post-World War II Western Europe.

== Critical use of the term ==
Belief in exceptionalism can represent erroneous thought analogous to historicism in that it overemphasizes peculiarities in an analysis and ignores or downplays meaningful comparisons. Thus, for example the Japanese political scientist Noritada Matsuda writes, "[W]hat is seemingly exceptional in one country may be found in other countries." In ideologically-driven debates, a group may assert exceptionalism, with or without the term, in order to exaggerate the appearance of difference, perhaps to create an atmosphere permissive of a wider latitude of action, and to avoid recognition of similarities that would reduce perceived justifications. If unwarranted, this represents an example of special pleading, a form of spurious argumentation that ignores relevant bases for meaningful comparison. Exceptionalism is often based on poor historical knowledge.

The term "exceptionalism" can imply criticism of a tendency to remain separate from others. For example, the reluctance of the United States government to join various international treaties is sometimes called "exceptionalist".

== Medical exceptionalism ==
Use of the term "HIV exceptionalism" implies that AIDS is a contagious disease that is or should be treated differently from other contagions or entails benefits not available to those suffering from other diseases.

== See also ==
Instances of exceptionalism:

- American exceptionalism and Manifest Destiny (United States of America)
- Chinese exceptionalism (China)
- Chosen people (multiple nations)
- Christ of Europe (Poland)
- God's Own Country (multiple nations)
- Holy Rus', Russian World, and Eurasianism (Russia)
- Indian exceptionalism (India)
- Nicaraguan exceptionalism (Nicaragua)
- Nihonjinron (Japan)
- Sonderweg (Germany)

Related terms:

- Anthropocentrism
- Chauvinism
- Civilizing mission
- Cultural exception
- Distinction (sociology)
- Eurocentrism or Western-centrism
- Grandiosity
- Great Divergence
- Historical recurrence
- Jingoism
- Rare Earth hypothesis
- Schismogenesis
- Special pleading
- Third Rome
