= Mara (gang) =

Form of gang originating in the United States

A mara (or marabunta) is a form of gang originating amongst Latinos in the United States (Los Angeles, California), which spread to Central American countries such as El Salvador, Honduras and Guatemala.

== Definition of mara ==
A mara is regarded as a group of delinquents of Latin America origin who reside in the United States but have spread towards Central America; namely, in the countries belonging to the Northern Triangle of Central America: Honduras, El Salvador and Guatemala. The maras are not just Central American phenomena; they are transnational. A mara has an organizational structure in which there is a leader in charge of a cadre which, in turn, branches in several cadres. Each of these sub-groups has internal functions such as recruiting followers for drug trafficking, logistics; attacks; intelligence, collection and propaganda, murder, and extortion among other criminal activities. The word “mara” points to the widely known gangs referred to as MS-13 and 18th Street. In the name Mara Salvatrucha, which the word mara became generalized from, mara is said to represent a fierce type of Central American ant.

== History: origin and background ==
In October 1979, the Governing Junta in El Salvador, composed of civilians and army officers, disintegrated as its civilian members resigned. This was due to their failure to reach an agreement on reforms and their inability to bring the military under control. Subsequently, the civil war erupted in 1980, marked by extreme violence, including the terrorizing and targeting of civilians by death squads and the recruitment of child soldiers.

During the 1960s, the 18th Street Gang was established in the Rampart area by young Latinos, predominantly Mexican. These individuals felt alienated, marginalized, excluded, and even targeted by the established Mexican-American population and local gangs. The genesis of MS-13 can be traced back to the civil war in El Salvador, which claimed over 70,000 lives and spanned from 1980 to 1992. This conflict created an environment rife with violence, economic instability, and job scarcity, prompting millions to flee and seek refuge, primarily in Los Angeles and Washington D.C.

Upon arriving in Los Angeles, many faced culture shock and struggled to integrate into the existing social fabric, often being viewed as vulnerable targets. Consequently, the initial cliques of Mara Salvatrucha emerged in 1985 and 1988. The gang experienced rapid growth initially by offering protection and assistance to Salvadoran immigrants navigating the challenges of their new environment. However, in the early 1990s, the U.S. Immigration and Naturalization Service initiated crackdowns on street gangs.

As a result, members of 18th Street and MS-13 who were deported back to Central America, were essentially "trained" in the U.S. This led to an unforeseen surge in street gangs and violence in countries across Central America, contributing to the proliferation of gang culture. These two gangs kept evolving over time to eventually become the maras. The maras are involved in criminal actions such as murder, rape, and all kinds of brutal criminal activities. They are recognizable by their eccentric tattoos spread across their entire bodies. Members of the maras had been deported to their countries of origin after serving their penalties in the US. Once in their mother country, they continued their criminal activity by forming gangs that function as branches of those in America, resulting in a significant security problem for the Latin American governments.

== Maras in the US and in Central and Latin America ==
Maras have transnational roots closely linked to migratory patterns related to the longest and second-longest civil wars in Latin American history; particularly in Guatemala and El Salvador from 1960 to 1996 and from 1980 to 1992 respectively. These armed conflicts caused thousands of Central Americans to leave their home countries, migrating up north, especially (but not exclusively) to Los Angeles in the United States. Youth gangs have existed since the 1960s and 1970s in Central America. The maras are a more recent phenomenon with transnational origins.

=== El Salvador ===
In El Salvador MS-13 and 18th Street are the most predominant street gangs and El Salvador's gang landscape has and continues to grow more complex over the years. As the gangs are getting more sophisticated, minors are using heavier weapons, the type of crimes they involve themselves in has changed, and the number of crimes they commit has increased. The deportations of gang members from the United States could be what is mainly fueling the local gang problem. Crime and violence is one of El Salvador’s most serious problems and gangs have become a serious security issue but the government has not done a proficient job at controlling these gangs. In addition, extensive police corruption has inflamed the gang problem even further. Some agents accept bribes, leak information, participate in cover-ups, and even supply gangs with drugs, weapons, or charging them “taxes.”

=== 18th Street ===
The 18th Street gang, commonly known as M-18, is a transnational criminal organization. This gang emerged in the 1960 and was formed by mainly Mexican immigrants, and then migrants coming from El Salvador and Guatemala. Thousands of Central Americans left their countries and fled to other places, especially to Los Angeles in the United States, when a civil war broke out in El Salvador.

=== Mara Salvatrucha ===
Mara Salvatrucha, also known as MS-13, is an international criminal gang that emerged in Los Angeles, California in the second half of the 1980s. This gang was founded by Salvadoran migrants. Over time, Mara Salvatrucha grew rapidly in size. Mara Salvatrucha members compete with the earlier existing M-18. As a transnational gang, they have a high degree of organization in their criminal activities.

== Activities ==
Maras activities range from arms trafficking, assault, auto theft, burglaries, drug trafficking, extortion, human trafficking, identity fraud, identity theft, illegal gambling, illegal immigration, kidnapping, money laundering, people smuggling, prostitution, racketeering, robbery and vandalism. Almost all maras display tattoos on their bodies as a sign of their affiliation to their gang. "La vida por las maras" or "[the] Life for the gang" is a very commonly used phrase by these gangs.

== Rivalries ==
The best known maras are Mara Salvatrucha and their rivals Calle 18. Maras were hunted by death squads including Sombra Negra.

== Democracy and problems in the three levels of security: national security, public security and citizen security ==
The maras increasingly arm their members with heavier weapons, including M-16s, AK-47s, and grenades, which the mara are reportedly improving their skills at using.

The maras have posed a threat to many institutions, such as governments, legal systems and the police, and have wreaked havoc on three levels of security -national security, public security and citizen security. Not only are the maras believed to be penetrating the police force, political groups and non-governmental organizations in all the countries in which they develop, but they also have established small businesses and competed unfairly since they use violence against competitors . As a consequence, the Central American democracies are seriously jeopardized. Three levels of security are at risk in Central America.

=== National security ===
It refers to the security of the nation-state and safeguarding the state's sovereignty over the territory and population inside its borders through the police force.

=== Public security ===
It is to do with the government intends to maintain the necessary civil order for the development of basic societal functions such as commerce, transport and communications.

=== Citizen security ===
It alludes to the efforts of the national government to secure the exercise of the economic, political and civil right on the part of the citizens.

== Measures taken by the governments to protect the citizens from the maras ==
In 2003, in Honduras, the president responded to the mara problem by forcing a change in the country’s penal code, establishing a maximum 12-year sentence for gang membership and he increased the sentence to 30 years and put the army on the street to support the nation’s 8,000 police officers.

The draconian anti-gang legislation in El Salvador is known as the Super Hard Hand “Super Mano Dura”. It consists of Salvadoran authorities arresting youths simply for having gang-related tattoos or flashing signs. Moreover, gang members have to serve up to five years in prison and gang leaders up to nine.

The Guatemalan Congress has passed an anti-gang law based on army troops' presence supporting neighborhoods invaded by gangs in Guatemala City.

In Panama, in contrast, the government has implemented a program called Friendly Hand ("Mano Amiga") aimed at giving at-risk youngsters positive alternatives to being a gang member. They resorted to theatre programs and sport activities.

At the international level, in January 2004, Guatemalan, Salvadoran, Honduran, Nicaraguan, and Dominican Republic officials joined to create a criminal organizations database to better track movements of the maras in the region.

In June 2004, at the Summit of Central American Presidents, a plan to combat the maras known as "Plan Centroamerica Segura" Central America Security Plan was proposed.

In 2005 the "Anti-mara Summit" was held. Finally, the governments of the region are in constant coordination to redress the problem of organized crime in Central America.

== See also ==
- Mara 18
- Mara Salvatrucha (MS-13 from Los Angeles)
- Vatos Locos
