= 18th Street gang =

Transnational criminal gang

18th Street Gang
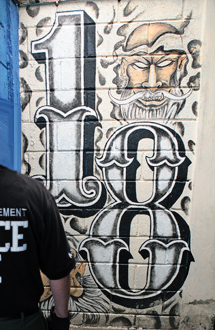
- 18th Street graffiti
- Founded: 1960s
- Founder: Carlos Mojica
- Founding location: Los Angeles, California, United States
- Years active: 1960s–present
- Territory: United States, Mexico, Central America, Canada
- Ethnicity: Mexicans, Salvadorans, Hondurans, Guatemalans, Nicaraguans, Native American, Costa Ricans
- Membership (est.): 30,000–50,000 members
- Activities: Drug trafficking, prostitution, extortion, kidnapping, robbery, assault, murder
- Allies: Mexican Mafia; Sureños; 38th Street gang
- Rivals: Avenues; Mara Salvatrucha; Playboys; Santa Monica 13; Temple Street (gang); Vineland Boys; Florencia 13; Bloods; Black P. Stones (Jungles)

The 18th Street Gang, also known as Eighteen St, Barrio 18, Mara 18, or simply 18 in North America, is a multi-ethnic (largely Mexican and Central American) street gang from Los Angeles, California. It is one of the largest street gangs in Los Angeles, with 30,000–50,000 members between the United States, Mexico, and Central America. A United States Department of Justice report featured the following statement regarding 18th Street and rival gang MS-13: "These two gangs have turned the Central American northern triangle into the area with the highest homicide rate in the world".

== History ==
The 18th Street Gang was formed in the Rampart District of Los Angeles in the 1960s by Mexican-Americans and other immigrant youths who were not accepted into existing Hispanic gangs, specifically Clanton 14. The Clanton 14 gang was composed of mostly Mexican Americans, and only accepted members of Mexican descent. Some members of Clanton 14 wanted to start a new clique called "Clanton 18th Street" and allow members of other ethnicities to join; however, this proposal was rejected by the Clanton 14, which led to the formation of the 18th Street Gang. The two gangs have been bitter rivals ever since.

18th Street grew by expanding its membership to other nationalities and races, and it was among the first multiracial, multi-ethnic gangs in Los Angeles. In the beginning, they were made up largely of second-generation Hispanics. As the 18th Street Gang began to battle with more established Hispanic gangs, they began to recruit outside the Hispanic community. There are approximately two hundred separate, autonomous gangs operating under the same name within separate barrios in the San Fernando Valley; specifically, in North Hollywood, the San Gabriel Valley, South Bay, Riverside, East Los Angeles, South Los Angeles, Hollywood, Downtown Los Angeles, Northeast Los Angeles, Pico Union, Westlake, Koreatown, Inglewood, South Gate, Huntington Park, Maywood, Bellflower, Long Beach, Orange County, San Bernardino County, and Los Angeles' Westside or West LA, according to the latest figures from the NDIC. In the early 2000s, the Federal Bureau of Investigation initiated wide-scale raids against known and suspected gang members, netting hundreds of arrests across the country.

=== Central America ===
18th Street started as a Mexican American gang, but the gang also became Central American as it started to recruit more members of other ethnic groups. When Central American gang members were arrested in the United States, they were then deported back to Central America, where the gang arose not just in El Salvador, but also in Honduras and Guatemala, becoming one of the most violent gangs in the region. 18th Street later became a bitter rival of MS-13 as both gangs sought supremacy in Central America. Members of 18th Street are mainly Mexican, Salvadoran, Honduran, and Guatemalan, but the gang does have members from other parts of Central America. 18th Street influences have recently been spotted in Belize as well.

In El Salvador, a faction called the "Revolucionarios ("Revolutionaries") split off 18th Street in 2005, becoming rivals with the other members, who came to be known as the Sureños ("Southerners.")

== Description ==
=== Location ===
The majority of 18th Street cliques operate throughout Southern California, but are active in other states and internationally as well. Los Angeles members began migrating to other areas outside California and started to establish their own gangs. 18th Street gangs are active in 44 cities in 20 U.S. states, as well internationally reported in Australia, Canada, England, France, Germany, Lebanon, Peru, Mexico, Guatemala, Honduras, Venezuela, the Philippines and historically, El Salvador.

=== Organization ===
The organization of the 18th Street Gang differs from location to location. With the gang being spread so vastly nationally and internationally, it is difficult to have a universal organizational structure. The gang is organized in such a way that allows for leadership at every level. One common organizational structure seen used by Barrio 18 is as follows. At the very top are “palabreros” or "leaders", a majority of whom are in prison, but still help run the gang by coordinating all criminal activities. "Palabreros" also exist outside of the prison and are known as "en la libre." Lastly, there are civilians who are known as collaborators. They are not officially gang members, but they are responsible for helping the gang with small jobs, like obtaining intelligence, and moving or holding illicit goods.

In Central America the 18th Street Gang designates positions in their organizational structure in another way; at the top are the leaders, known as the "toros," meaning bull. Underneath each “toro” is a clica, which is led by a "homie." Under each "homie" are the "soldados," meaning soldiers. Outside of the prisons, Barrio 18 is organized into divisions based on territory called "canchas" (courts) at city/neighborhood level and "tribus" (tribes) at regional level. The gang is horizontal in structure, allowing for a more decentralized approach to things. Although, overall 18th Street Gang is not very organized compared to some other modern day gangs. Women were also able to join the gang, but were treated very poorly. The women that joined the gang had three ways to do so, first was an 18-second beating, second was sexual intercourse with multiple members, and the last option was being the girlfriend or wife of a member can potentially lead to membership over time. The women were expected to take on male-associated roles often involving violence, as well as playing more of a mother role by caring for children and taking care of the sick.

=== Culture ===
18th Street Gang members are required to abide by a strict set of rules. Failure to obey the word of a gang leader, or to show proper respect to a fellow gang member, may result in an 18-second beating, or even execution for more serious offenses. According to the FBI, some factions of the 18th Street Gang have developed a high level of sophistication and organization. 18th Street Gang members often identify themselves with the number 18 on their clothing and sporting clothing from sports teams such as the Los Angeles Clippers, Los Angeles Rams, Los Angeles Chargers, Los Angeles Dodgers, Los Angeles Lakers, Los Angeles Kings, and Las Vegas Raiders. 18th Street will use the symbols XV3, XVIII, X8, 666, 99, and 3-dots (Mi Vida Loca [My Crazy Life]) in their graffiti and tattoos. 18th Street colors are blue and black; blue is to represent and to pay tribute to The Mexican Mafia, and black is to represent the original color for the gang. The 18th Street Gang is occasionally referred to as the "Children's Army" because of its recruitment of elementary and middle-school aged youth. They also allow other ethnicities to join their ranks making the gang multi-ethnic. In El Salvador it is common for members of the gang to be tattooed on the face with a large "18". In many cases the tattoo covers the entire face.

== Criminal activity ==
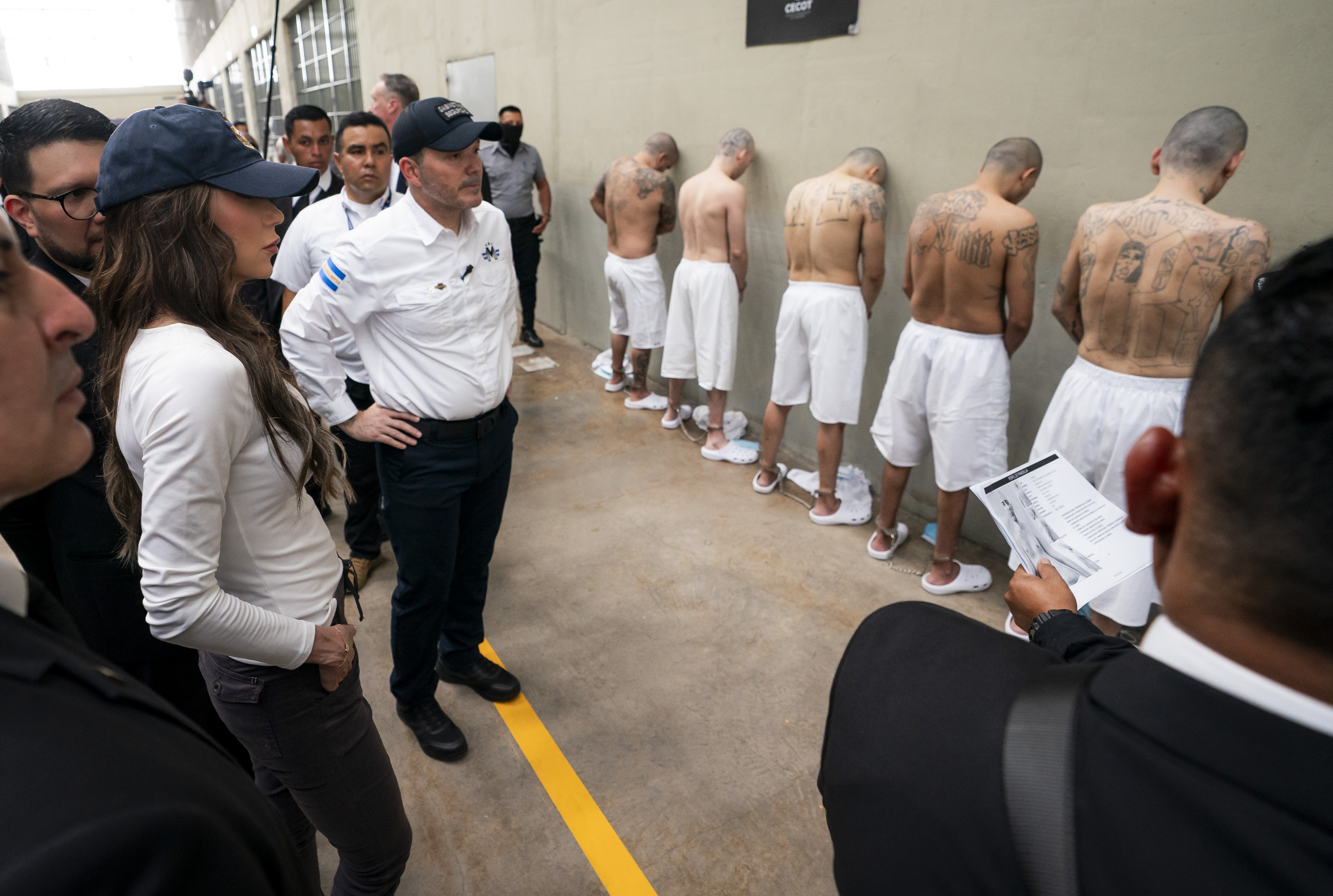
Members of the 18th Street gang incarcerated at CECOT

The most lucrative activity of the 18th Street gang is street-level distribution of cocaine and marijuana, and to a lesser extent, heroin and methamphetamine. The gang is also involved in auto theft, carjacking, drive-by shootings, extortion, identification fraud, robbery, assault and homicide.

Special Agent George Rodriguez of the U.S. Bureau of Alcohol, Tobacco, Firearms and Explosives (ATF) described the 18th Street gang as "one of the most violent street gangs and one of the most prolific in the United States". 18th Street is a well established gang that is involved in all areas of street-crime. Several 18th Street Gang members have reached a higher level of sophistication and organization in their illicit activities than other gangs. While their main source of income is street-level distribution of drugs, they also have been linked to murders, assaults, arson, copyright infringement, extortion, human trafficking, illegal immigration, kidnapping, prostitution, robbery, and weapons trafficking, as well as other crimes. The 18th Street Gang has also been implicated in the high-profile kidnapping and murder of the 16-year-old brother of internationally renowned Honduran football player Wilson Palacios.

In 1998, Catarino Gonzalez was sentenced to life in prison after a jury convicted Gonzalez of first-degree murder for fatally shooting Officer Filbert Cuesta in the back of the head, while the officer was sitting in a patrol car.

Kingston, New York police arrested and jailed several young men on the charge that they abducted a victim, took him to nearby woods, and murdered him. They were held on federal murder and racketeering charges.

In 2019, an 18th Street gangster was fatally shot by a member of rival gang MS-13 in a Queens subway station.

In Guatemala City, many bus drivers who drove through the alleged territory of the gang have been killed by 18th Street Gang members. Bus drivers have also often been victims of robberies and extortion.

== In film ==
- La Vida Loca, a 2008 documentary film by Christian Poveda

== See also ==
- Criminal tattoo
- Mejicanos massacre
- Transnational gangs
