= Mujahid Abdul-Karim =

African-American convert to Islam

- Born: Benjamin Farmer; December 26, 1944 (age 81); Waldo, Arkansas, United States
- Occupation: Islamic scholar
- Website: www.masjidalrasul.com

Imam Mujahid Abdul-Karim (born Benjamin Farmer, December 26, 1944) is an African-American convert to Islam, who is best known for his involvement and "spearheading" of the April 26, 1992 Watts Gang Truce between the four influential rival gangs— Watts Hacienda Village Bloods, Grape Street Watts Crips, Bounty Hunter Watts Bloods, and PJ Watts Crips. He is imam of Masjid Al Rasul mosque in Watts, Los Angeles and the leader of The Imam Mahdi Movement.

== Early life ==
Mujahid Abdul-Karim was born as "Benjamin Farmer" in the town of Waldo, Arkansas. As an infant his family moved from the rural south to the rural north, just outside Lake Michigan, to the area of Muskegon Heights, Michigan. His father, Benjamin Farmer (senior), was a veteran of the army and worked as a factory worker. His mother, Ledora Jackson, was a homemaker, who was the primary caregiver for his thirteen siblings. As a child, he grew up extremely poor and at the age of nine became a "shoe shine boy", walking across the segregation dividing line ("train tracks") to the "white section" of Muskegon to shine shoes for a "quarter a shine." He would earn about twenty dollars each weekend and gave a portion of the money to help with the expenses of the house.

Consequently, due to this extreme poverty, in 1961, he ran away from home at the age of 16, after pretending to pay a "light bill" for his mother and subsequently purchased a bus ticket, traveling alone across the country to the city of New Haven, Connecticut, to stay with relatives. He would stay in New Haven for the next three years, until on the invitation of one of his older brothers, Edward, was asked to come to move to Chicago, Illinois.

In Chicago was where, while living in the historical African American area of the South Side, Abdul-Karim would soon be introduced to the political ideologies of Black empowerment, self-determination, and human rights, which would later shape his political direction and identity.

== Activities ==
=== Black Panther Party Involvement (1967 - 1970) ===
Through his younger brother, Johnny, who was already a member of the Black Panther Party, he began to be educated about the importance of black empowerment and political awareness. Soon after, Abdul-Karim, began to attend political awareness classes being held by the Black Panthers and eventually became a member himself. By 1968, Abdul-Karim was actively speaking on college campuses, handing out political leaflets, going to political demonstrations, and actually began living at the Chicago Black Panther Party headquarters.

While living at the Chicago Black Panther Party headquarters, Abdul-Karim lived alongside such notable figures as current U.S. Representative for Illinois's 1st congressional district, Bobby Rush (who was a member of the party at the time), and Deborah Johnson, (mother of Fred Hampton Jr. and wife of slain famous Black Panther, Fred Hampton).

=== Relocation to Watts, Los Angeles & Conversion to Sunni Islam (1970 - 1980) ===
As the Black Panther Party began to decline, due to organized efforts to disassemble the organization by the FBI's Cointelpro, Abdul-Karim was encouraged by several of his brothers to make the relocation to the city of Los Angeles, California. During this time, the late 1970s, areas such as South Central and Watts, Los Angeles were transitioning from Civil Rights "conscious" neighborhoods to havens of illegal drugs and gang activity (most notably the two notorious rival street gangs, Crips and Bloods).

Subsequently, Abdul-Karim thought it important to work with the African American youth of the South Central area, in particular the area of Watts (the historical birthplace of the 1965 Watts Rebellion), who were now becoming heavily involved in drug trafficking and street gangs. During this period of his life, Abdul-Karim also newly converted to the religion of Islam after an in-depth conversation with a Muslim by the name of Muhammad Abdullah (father of the NFL football players, Hamza Abdullah and Husain Abdullah).

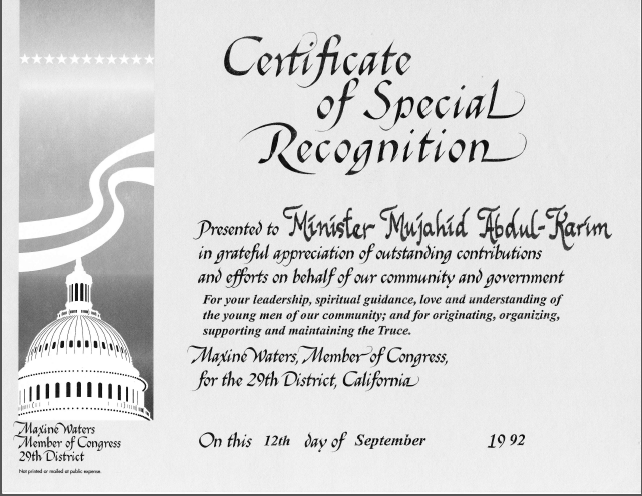
Special Recognition awarded by Congresswoman Maxine Waters

=== Masjid Al Rasul (1980 - Present) ===
In 1980 Abdul-Karim founded his own mosque, Masijd Al Rasul, on South Central Avenue. This site location would become the historical meeting and signing place of the Watts Peace Treaty of April 26, 1992, between the four influential Watts rival gangs— Watts Cirkle City Piru Bloods, Grape Street Watts Crips, Bounty Hunter Watts Bloods, and PJ Watts Crips.

=== Conversion to Shia Islam (1982 - 1983) ===
After founding Masjid Al Rasul in 1980, Abdul-Karim decided, inspired by traditions of the Prophet of Islam, Muhammad, who worked to develop a lasting peace between the two warring tribes of the holy Islamic city Medina (the Banu Aws and Banu Khazraj - who had been fighting each other for over a hundred years), that his life's mission was to convey the message of "peace" to the two warring gangs of Los Angeles, California, Bloods and Crips.

Abdul-Karim began tirelessly community organizing in the three notorious project complexes located in the Watts area: Nickerson Gardens, Jordan Downs, and Imperial Courts. It would take an approximate 12 years of talking to rival gang leaders to finally see the dream of a truce being signed in the Masjid Al Rasul. During this period of his community social activism, having converted to Islam, he also had his first encounters with several Iranian foreign students who were at the time attending UCLA and were regularly attending the Friday prayer service being held at the mosque. These students were followers of the Shia school of Islamic thought and gave him a book to read about the grandson of the Prophet of Islam, Muhammad, Hussain ibn Ali. After reading this book, and being convinced of the validity of the Shia school of Islam through other proofs, Abdul-Karim decided he was going to convert his masjid to the first ever indigenous African American run Shia mosque in America.

=== Travels Abroad: Islamic Republic of Iran (1983 - 1990) ===
During the period spanning from 1983 to 1989, Abdul-Karim felt it was necessary to go to the holy seminary city of Qom, Iran, in order to further enhance his knowledge of Islam. While at the seminary in Qom, Abdul-Karim was invited and was able to sit in on several lectures and speeches given by the late leader of the Islamic Republic of Iran, Ayatollah Ruhollah Khomeini, and was able to hold meetings with the then President of Iran, Ayatollah Ali Khamenei (current supreme leader of Iran), Akbar Hashemi Rafsanjani, Ayatollah Ahmad Jannati, and past Iranian President, Mohammad Khatami.

However, in 1990, Abdul-Karim was forced to return to America to continue the work of "building" a lasting peace among gang leaders in the Watts community of Los Angeles, California.

=== Watts "Bloods and Crips" Peace Truce (April 26, 1992 - Present) ===
The historic Watts Peace Treaty was signed on April 26, 1992, after successful meetings were held at Masjid Al Rasul.

== Special awards, honors, and recognition ==
- Ambassador for Peace award presented by Senator Roderick Wright
- Special Recognition for originating Watts Peace Treaty by Congresswoman Maxine Waters
- Certificate of Recognition for the 20th Anniversary of the Watts Peace Treaty by Councilman Joe Buscaino
- Past community adviser to the King-Drew Medical Center of Los Angeles, California

== Masjid Al Rasul in Fine Art ==
The famed American color photographer Joel Sternfeld included a photo of the interior of Masjid Al Rasul (after the signing of the historic Watts Peace Treaty) in his book, On This Site: Landscape in Memoriam (1997). This photo was then later donated to the world renown Art Institute of Chicago.

=== Commentary on Joel Sternfeld Masjid Al Rasul Photograph ===
Art commentary has been written on Joel Sternfeld's photograph of the interior of Masjid Al Rasul. The art critic, Geoff Dyer, states the following about the inspiration he draws from the photograph:

One of the most moving photographs I know is also one of the dullest: an empty, uninteresting-looking room with a brown carpet and beige walls. It comes at the end of Joel Sternfeld's book On This Site (1996).

Dyer further continues with:

The picture I referred to at the beginning is a kind of a postscript; it comes after the Afterword, after the Acknowledgements etc. The dull room is in the Masjid Al Rasul mosque in Watts, where members of the Bloods and the Crips, rival Los Angeles gangs, negotiated and signed a truce on April 26, 1992. In the aftermath of all that has gone before the promise of this picture is all the more immense for being tentative, provisional. It offers simple documentary proof of Maxim Gorky's belief that 'Life will always be bad enough for the desire for something better not to be extinguished in men.'
