= Watts Gang Task Force =

The Watts Gang Task Force (also known as the WGTF) is a community-based group that was created to reduce gang related crime in the Watts, Los Angeles, California and improve community-police relations in the area.

== History ==
In December 2005, over a 31-day period, violence in the Watts community escalated. There were 18 gang related shootings, seven of which were homicides. Los Angeles Councilwoman Janice Hahn called a meeting of community leaders, the Los Angeles Police Department, school representatives, service providers, gang intervention workers, and city departments and facilitated by Patricia Villasenor of the City of Los Angeles Human Relations Commission, to see how, together, they could stop the violence and improve police and community relations. This was the beginning of the Watts Gang Task Force. Since that first meeting in January 2006, the task force has met every Monday in Councilwoman Hahn's Watts office, and facilitated by the Human Relations Commission.

== Activities ==
The greater Watts area has one of the highest concentrations of gangs within Los Angeles County. LAPD estimates that there are at least 59 known and active gangs in the Southeast Division. Specifically, the Watts/Southeast GRYD contains an estimated 14 known and active African American and Latino gangs, of which three are Blood cliques, eight are Crips cliques, and three are Latino cliques. The most active gangs in the GRYD according to law enforcement are African American gangs, due to the longstanding rivalries between the Bloods and the Crips, and the dominant gangs within the public housing developments.

== Gangs ==
Crip Gangs	Blood Gangs	Latino Gangs								
Grape Street Watts Crips	Bounty Hunter Bloods	Watts Varrio Grape Street		East Coast Crip	Hacienda Village Boys	Morton Town Stoners	Back St Watts Crips Front St Watts Crips	Miller Bloods	5th and Hill	
Nut Hood Watts Crips	Bebop Bloods	Watts Varrio Locotes 13	Elm Street Watts Morton Town Watts	Twilight Zone Crips	Athens Park	Elm Street Watts		112th Neighborhood	Circle City Piru	Ivy Street
Avalon Gangster Crips		Village Boys								
120th St Hustlers Crips	Family Swan Bloods	Suicidal								
Pee Jay watts Crips	9 Deuce Bishops	Colonia Weigand								
118 Holmes st crips		Southside Watts								
92 hat gang		KILLING MOB 13 WATTS (KMOB)	Krazy Mexican Town KMT							
7 STR watts		Nut Hood Watts 13								
99 watts mafia		Hickory st watts 13								
