= Watts truce =

1992 street gang peace agreement in Los Angeles, California

The Watts truce, also known as the Treaty of Watts or Watts Peace Treaty, was a 1992 peace agreement among rival street gangs in Los Angeles, California, declared in the neighborhood of Watts. The truce was reached just days before the 1992 Los Angeles riots and, although not universally adhered to, was a major factor in the decline of street violence in the city between the 1990s and 2010s.

== Background and 1988 attempt ==
The late 1960s and the 1970s saw the formation of the Crips and the Bloods, which became rival gangs, but by the 1980s the infiltration of rock cocaine and high-powered weapons into poor inner cities had created infighting among factions. By the early 1990s, after 20 years of increasing gang warfare across public housing projects that saw peak crime rates in Los Angeles, gang members themselves began trying to stem the violence. An effort took place in 1988, which was dubbed the "Year of the Gang" by the LAPD and city leaders following the murder of Karen Toshima in the city's Westwood neighborhood. In July of that year, the Rev. Charles Mims Jr. and others organized a gang summit in South Los Angeles, but formal support for gang prevention was non-existent at the time and this early effort was short-lived in media. Most of the members attending kept the truce going and did not resort to violence against each other, in particular the two Watts gang factions, the Bounty Hunter Bloods and the A Line Crips, and the truce still stands to this day. In October 1989, Minister Louis Farrakhan visited Los Angeles to deliver his Stop the Killing speech aimed at curtailing gang killings. He returned for part two at the Los Angeles Memorial Sports Arena in January 1990 where hundreds of Crips and Bloods members were in attendance.

== 1992 peace treaty ==
In April 1992, Crips and Bloods in the Watts neighborhood in southern Los Angeles convened to negotiate peace. The Grape Street Crips from the Jordan Downs Projects, the PJ Watts Crips from the Imperial Courts housing projects, the Bounty Hunter Bloods from the Nickerson Gardens housing projects, and the Hacienda Village Bloods agreed to a ceasefire agreement following the death of Henry Peco, who had been shot execution-style by LAPD officers during a blackout in the Imperial Courts housing project.

On April 28, 1992, representatives from these four gangs signed a formal peace treaty at a mosque in Watts. The treaty was modeled on the 1949 Armistice Agreements reached between Israel and Egypt. Jim Brown helped establish the truce through his Amer-I-Can Foundation. Within days of the truce, despite the relative lawlessness caused by the 1992 Los Angeles riots, most of the African-American gangs in the city declared themselves at peace and there were no major flare-ups in violence. The Watts truce is generally credited with contributing to the trend in declining street violence rates in Los Angeles.

== In popular culture ==
- Rapper Kam came out with the song "Peace Treaty". The song reached #2 on the Hot Rap Singles chart in 1993.
- The rapper Ice-T, who grew up in nearby Crenshaw, wrote the song "Gotta Lotta Love" on his album Home Invasion in tribute to the truce.
- In the song "Real Muthaphuckkin G's" by Eazy-E, guest rapper Dresta raps about how Dr. Dre only started trying to act like a gangsta "around the time of the peace treaty", when he knew the streets of Los Angeles had calmed down.
- In the film Straight Outta Compton, two men approach the police with a red handkerchief tied to a blue handkerchief, symbolizing the gang truce during the 1992 riots.

== See also ==
- Crime in Los Angeles
- Hoe Avenue peace meeting
- Bangin' on Wax
