= Menace II Society =

1993 film by the Hughes Brothers

- Theatrical release poster
- Directed by: The Hughes Brothers
- Screenplay by: Tyger Williams
- Story by: Allen Hughes; Albert Hughes; Tyger Williams
- Produced by: Darin Scott
- Starring: Tyrin Turner; Jada Pinkett; Bill Duke; Charles S. Dutton
- Cinematography: Lisa Rinzler
- Edited by: Christopher Koefoed
- Music by: QD III
- Production company: New Line Cinema
- Distributed by: New Line Cinema
- Release date: May 26, 1993
- Running time: 97 minutes
- Country: United States
- Language: English
- Budget: $3.5 million
- Box office: $30 million

Menace II Society (Note: Pronounced as "Menace to Society") is a 1993 American teen crime drama film directed by the Hughes brothers in their directorial debut. Set in the Watts and Crenshaw neighborhoods of Los Angeles, the film follows the life of Caine Lawson (Tyrin Turner) as he struggles with the realities of his gang affiliation and inner-city life with his close friends. The film was released by New Line Cinema on May 26, 1993, and gained notoriety for its scenes of violence, profanity and drug-related content, but received critical acclaim for the performances of Turner, Jada Pinkett (in her theatrical film debut) and Larenz Tate, its direction, and its realistic portrayal of urban violence and powerful underlying messages. It grossed $30 million against a $3.5 million budget.

== Plot ==
Kaydee "Caine" Lawson and his best friend Kevin "O-Dog" Anderson enter a liquor store to buy some malt liquor, but a Korean cashier and his wife pressure them to quickly purchase their drinks. As they depart, the cashier deliberately insults O-Dog by remarking, "I feel sorry for your mother." Enraged, O-Dog murders him and his wife. He subsequently purloins the surveillance tape, loots both the cashier's wallet and the cash register, and escapes with Caine.

In a flashback, Caine recalls that when he was 10, he lost his parents Tat and Karen to an unsuccessful drug deal and a heroin overdose, respectively. James "Pernell" Richards, Tat's business partner and Caine's "uncle", is jailed and serving life in prison. This led to Caine's paternal grandparents raising him in the crime-ridden Jordan Downs housing projects, where he met O-Dog and the two eventually joined a street gang.

Years later, Caine graduates from high school. To celebrate, he and his cousin Harold attend a party, where O-Dog flaunts the surveillance tape to a group of their closest friends, greatly upsetting Caine. Later, while the duo are departing from the party, carjackers ambush them, killing Harold and wounding Caine. After learning the carjackers' whereabouts, Caine, O-Dog and their friend A-Wax ambush and gun them down, avenging Harold.

Sometime later, Caine visits Ronnie, Pernell's younger girlfriend, and bonds with her young son Anthony. One night, Chauncey (a friend of Caine and O-Dog), orders them to steal an expensive car from a parking garage, but they are caught and arrested. O-Dog is released, but Caine is detained as his fingerprints match those on a dropped beer bottle during the liquor store murders. During an interrogation, a detective attempts to disorient Caine by repeatedly changing the questions, but Caine is eventually released. Caine's other friends, Stacy and Sharif, invite him to accompany them to Kansas, but he declines, fearing that he will never survive outside of his familiar criminal life. His religious grandfather and Mr. Butler (Sharif's father and a schoolteacher) both advise him to change his ways, lest he be jailed or killed.

Caine begins purchasing and cooking large amounts of crack cocaine, quickly becoming a dealer and hardened member of the gang. He romances a local girl named Ilena and has sex with her. One night, cops stop and assault him and Sharif before deliberately dumping them in a Hispanic neighborhood, expecting them to be further assaulted by Hispanic gang members. Surprisingly, the gang members sympathetically take them to a hospital instead. During his hospitalization, Ronnie invites Caine to accompany her to her new secretarial job in Atlanta. Initially hesitant, he ultimately agrees. At a party, Caine witnesses an inebriated Chauncey making sexual advances towards Ronnie. Angered, Caine pistol whips Chauncey, but is soon restrained by Stacy and Sharif. Chauncey retaliatorily sends his copy of the surveillance tape to the police. Ilena calls Caine about her pregnancy, but he denies paternity and rejects her.

Ronnie and Caine visit the imprisoned Pernell, who encourages an emotional Caine to be a more positive role model for Anthony and relocate to Atlanta. Afterwards, Caine returns home, but Ilena's criminal cousin approaches him outside his house. An argument about Ilena and her pregnancy ensues, causing Caine to brutally stomp on Ilena's cousin in front of his onlooking neighbors. Caine's grandfather promptly comes outside, stops Caine and brings him inside. Finally having had enough of Caine's violent, trouble-prone ways, Caine's grandparents eject him from their house, despite his pleas to stay until he leaves for Atlanta. Learning from their friend Doc of Chauncey's betrayal, a now-wanted Caine and O-Dog seek refuge at Ronnie's and other friends' houses. O-Dog vows revenge on Chauncey while Ilena's cousin gathers his friends to seek revenge on Caine.

As Caine and Ronnie prepare to depart for Atlanta, Ilena's cousin and his friends approach Ronnie's house and engage in a drive-by shootout, instantly killing Sharif and fatally wounding Caine as he shields Anthony. Afterwards, Stacy and Ronnie emerge from the house, respectively tending to Caine and Anthony. As Caine's life flashes before him, he recalls his grandfather asking him if he cares whether he lives or dies, and he realizes in his dying moment that he does.

== Cast ==
- Tyrin Turner as Kaydee "Caine" Lawson
  - Brandon Hammond as five-year-old Caine
- Jada Pinkett as Ronnie
- Larenz Tate as Kevin "O-Dog" Anderson
- MC Eiht as A-Wax
- Glenn Plummer as James "Pernell" Richards
- Clifton Powell as Chauncey
- Arnold Johnson as Thomas Lawson
- Pooh-Man as Doc
- Julian Roy Doster as Anthony
- Too Short as Lew-Loc
- Khandi Alexander as Karen Lawson
- Vonte Sweet as Sharif Butler
- Bill Duke as Detective
- Samuel L. Jackson as Tat Lawson
- Charles S. Dutton as Mr. Butler
- Saafir as Harold Lawson
- Ryan Williams as Stacy
- Reginald Ballard as Clyde
- Samuel Monroe Jr. as Ilena's cousin

== Production ==
New Line Cinema announced the film on July 27, 1992. Rappers Spice 1 and Tupac Shakur were initially set to play Caine and Sharif, respectively. Spice 1 also claimed he was considered for O-Dog, but he lost out on an acting role for the film, due to communication errors with his manager. According to MC Eiht, rapper MC Ren was set to play A-Wax, but left after the Hughes brothers grew dissatisfied with his performance during screen tests. MC Eiht would ultimately be cast as A-Wax. The Hughes brothers were hired to direct the film after working with Shakur in the music video for "Brenda's Got a Baby."

In 2023, Allen Hughes claimed that Eazy-E was initially supposed to play O-Dog. However, this would never happen as Hughes deemed Eazy-E "controlling." Ice Cube was also offered the role of O-Dog after portraying Doughboy in Boyz n the Hood, but he turned down the role to avoid being typecasted.

Principal photography began in the Watts neighborhood of Los Angeles, with residents of Jordan Downs appearing as extras and the Grape Street Watts Crips working as security. However, Tupac and Spice 1 were fired shortly into filming, with director Allen Hughes stating that Shakur was causing trouble on the set. Shakur was angry for not being told why Sharif would turn Muslim. When Shakur was cast in the role of Sharif, described in the film as "an ex-knucklehead turned Muslim", he did not agree with how the character was written. While many of his rap music contemporaries were portraying roles similar to their gangsta rap personas, Sharif would have required Shakur to portray the character as a stoic and pious Muslim. According to MC Eiht, who played A-Wax in the film:

My take on it was, everytime we got ready to rehearse, he had an opinion about his character…He wanted them to write in the script WHY he turned Muslim...Show me why I turned Muslim and they wouldn't do it and that's what angered him...You're not just going to give people that ideal that Tupac is just this yeah you know, "preach my brother", fuck that!

Six months after the firing, Shakur assaulted Hughes, resulting in Shakur being found guilty of assault and battery. Nonetheless, after Tupac's death, Allen Hughes praised the actor, stating "If 'Pac had been in the movie he would've outshined everyone."

== Reception ==
=== Box office ===
The film opened to $3,816,393 million in its debut weekend. It has grossed $27.9 million in the United States and Canada and $1.6 million internationally for a worldwide total of $29.5 million.

=== Critical response ===
Menace II Society received generally positive reviews from critics. The film has an 85% approval score on Rotten Tomatoes based on 46 reviews, with an average rating of 7.40/10. The consensus reads, "Told with grit and verve by the Hughes brothers in their feature debut, Menace II Society is a gangland epic that breathes with authenticity while steeped in style." Metacritic gave the film a weighted average score of 76 out of 100, based on 19 critics, indicating "generally favorable reviews".

Chicago Reader critic Jonathan Rosenbaum stated, "This is a powerful, convincing, and terrifying look at teenage crime in contemporary Watts." Owen Gleiberman from Entertainment Weekly gave it a positive review, stating, "Menace II Society is bleak, brilliant, and unsparing."

Emanuel Levy gave the film an A, saying it is "The most stunning feature debut in the new African American cinema, even more so than Boyz n the Hood to which the coming of age feature bears thematic resemblance." The film was placed on both Gene Siskel and Roger Ebert's 10 best films of 1993 lists, with Ebert praising "the way the filmmakers tell Caine's story without making him seem either the hero or victim".

However, the film has also received some negative reviews. Geoff Andrew of Time Out stated, "Regrettably, the Hughes Brothers' first feature is a compendium of clichés." Stephen Holden of The New York Times stated, "If Menace II Society is terrific on ambiance, it is considerably less successful in revealing character."

At the 1994 MTV Movie Awards, the film was awarded Best Movie, beating out the likes of The Fugitive, Jurassic Park, Philadelphia and Schindler's List. At the Independent Spirit Awards, the film was nominated for Best First Feature, but lost to El Mariachi (the first installment in the Robert Rodriguez's Mexico Trilogy).

=== Legacy ===
In 2013, rapper and record producer Kanye West cited Menace II Society as one of his "most-watched" favorite films on an episode of the Bret Easton Ellis Podcast.

Menace II Society was used as inspiration for the video game, Grand Theft Auto: San Andreas.

== Awards and nominations ==
1993 Independent Spirit Awards

- Best First Feature (nominated)
- Best Cinematography (won) – Rinzler
- Best Male Lead (nominated) – Turner

1994 MTV Movie Award

- Best Movie (won)

== Soundtrack ==
A soundtrack containing hip hop music was released on May 26, 1993, by Jive Records. It peaked at #11 on the Billboard 200 and #1 on the Top R&B/Hip-Hop Albums.

== Home media ==
The director's cut of Menace II Society was released on LaserDisc in January 1994 via the Criterion Collection.

Menace II Society was released on DVD in 1997 by New Line Home Video. The director's cut was released on DVD in 2009. This film was also included in "double feature" and "4 Film Favorites" DVD packages in the 2010s. There is one "double feature" package in DVD Region 1 that includes Juice (released in 2013), and another that includes New Jack City (released in 2016), in addition to Menace II Society. The "4 Film Favorites" DVD package, released in 2013 in Region 1, includes ATL, New Jack City and Set It Off, in addition to Menace II Society.

In August 2021, Criterion announced that Menace II Society, alongside 5 other films, would be released as a part of its first 4K Ultra HD releases. Criterion indicated each title will be available in a 4K UHD+Blu-ray combo pack including a 4K UHD disc of the feature film as well as the film and special features on the companion Blu-ray. The titles were released in November 2021.

== See also ==
- List of films featuring surveillance
- List of hood films
