= Hoe Avenue peace meeting =

Gang gathering in New York City

The Hoe Avenue peace meeting was a gathering of gangs that took place in the Bronx, New York City, on December 8, 1971. It was called to propose a general truce and an unprecedented inter-gang alliance, and was one of the first attempts by street organizations to broker a truce. The impetus for the meeting was the murder of Cornell Benjamin, known as "Black Benjie", a peace keeper of the Ghetto Brothers. While no lasting peace was ever established, a subsequent negotiation established a procedure for dealing with conflicts to avoid street warfare, and the truce lasted until the crack cocaine wars erupted in the early 1980s. The birth of hip-hop has been traced to playground jams during the truce period.

== Background ==
In the early 1970s, the New York City police recognized that there were as many as 10,000 gang members in the Bronx alone. On December 2, 1971, Cornell Benjamin, known as "Black Benjie", a former heroin addict turned community activist who had joined the Bronx gang the Ghetto Brothers and become their minister of peace, led a delegation to meet with members of rival gangs the Mongols, the Savage Skulls, and the Seven Immortals in order to negotiate a truce. He was beaten to death.

== Peace meeting ==
Instead of avenging the death, the leader of the Ghetto Brothers, Benjamin Melendez, known as "Yellow Benjie", called a peace meeting at the Boys Club on Hoe Avenue. It took place on December 8, 1971, and was attended by two hundred representatives from dozens of Bronx gangs, including the Black Pearls, Black Spades, Dirty Dozens, Dutchmen, Latin Spades, Liberated Panthers, Magnificent Seven, Peacemakers, Royal Javelins, Savage Skulls, Seven Immortals, Turbans, and Young Sinners, together with police and city officials.

Presidents, vice-presidents, and warlords sat on folding chairs in a circle in the middle of the club's gymnasium. Gang members took seats in the bleachers, while wives were made to wait outside the building. Only two women were permitted inside—the presidents of the all-girl gangs, the Alley Cats and the Savage Sisters—and they were seated in the last row, behind the warlords. To guard against violence, a member of the Turbans gang was stationed with a rifle on a rooftop across the street.

The gang representatives agreed that the media would be glad for them to kill each other in a gang war. They voted for peace.

== Aftermath ==
The truce lasted until the outbreak of the crack cocaine turf wars in the early 1980s. A member of the Bronx gang crisis squad of the New York City Youth Services Agency, Eduardo Vincenti, known as "Spanish Eddie", worked to have every major gang in the Bronx sign a formal treaty and form a grand alliance to be called "The Family", which he hoped could be guided to become a force for good. Sixty-eight gangs had signed on when Vincenti and 10 other crisis squad members were suddenly reassigned to Brooklyn. He continued his efforts in the Bronx in his spare time, surviving being shot in the face trying to prevent a gun battle in the West Farms neighborhood. Bronx crisis squad members believed the shooting was orchestrated in response to his attempts to broker a treaty.

With the truce, teenagers gathered more freely, and playground jams in the Bronx gave rise to hip-hop.

== Commemorations ==
In 2011, a 40th anniversary commemoration was held at the Bronx River Art Center. Former members of the Ghetto Brothers and Black Panthers spoke to the New York Daily News in advance; Joseph Mpa of the Black Panthers noted the role of the truce in the rise of hip-hop.

In June 2023, the intersection where "Black Benjie" was killed was renamed to Cornell "Black Benjie" Benjamin Way.

== In media ==
The peace meeting inspired the gang summit in the 1979 film The Warriors and its various adaptations. It appears in Flyin' Cut Sleeves, a documentary film by Rita Fecher and Henry Chalfant that was made in 1993 and released in 2009, and is the focus of Shan Nicholson's 2015 documentary Rubble Kings.

== See also ==
- Watts Truce
