= Imarjoe Miller =

American boxer

Personal information
- Nickname: Macho
- Born: March 19, 1979 (age 47) Watts, Los Angeles, California, U.S.
- Height: 5 ft 7 in (170 cm)
- Weight: Light Welterweight

Boxing career
- Stance: Orthodox

Boxing record
- Total fights: 3
- Wins: 1
- Win by KO: 0
- Losses: 2
- Draws: 0

Imarjoe Miller (born March 19, 1979) is an American professional boxer. Miller, a late-comer to the sport, went from juvenile delinquency to becoming a pro boxer. He is currently trained by Troy Bodean (boxing) at the wildcard boxing gym Roach.

== Early life ==
Born in the Watts of Los Angeles, Miller's challenging life experiences have proven conducive to finding a career in the boxing ring. On August 9, 2002, he married Carletta Perkins also from Watts of Los Angeles

== Amateur record ==
- One amateur fight at Villegas Park.

== Professional career ==
He made his professional boxing debut scheduled on September 29, 2011, at the Hollywood park casino in Los Angeles, winning by unanimous decision.

== Professional boxing record ==
1 Wins (0 knockouts, 2 decision), 2 Losses, 0 Draws, 0 No Contests
Result	Record	Opponent	Type	Round	Date	Location	Notes
Loss	1–2	(United States) Alexander Podrezov	UD	4	2012-03-31	Finish Line Sports Grill, Pomona, California, U.S.	
Loss	1-1	(United States) Thomas Valdez	TKO	2(4)	2012-02-17	(United States) Celebrity Theater, Phoenix, Arizona, U.S.	
Win	1–0	(United States) Ricardo Cubias	UD	4	2011-9-29	(United States) Hollywood park casino, Los Angeles, California, U.S.	
