= Benjamin Melendez =

American gang member and musician

Benjamin "Yellow Benjy" Melendez (August 3, 1952 – May 28, 2017) was best known for brokering the gang truce in the Bronx and Harlem (New York City) in 1971. At that time, he was President of the Ghetto Brothers, a mainly ethnically Puerto Rican South Bronx gang, and lead vocalist of a musical group also known as the Ghetto Brothers.

Melendez was heavily involved in the rise of Puerto Rican nationalist consciousness among Nuyorican youth, having forged connections with the Puerto Rican Socialist Party. Melendez's family, including Melendez himself, were Conversos (Sephardic crypto-Jews), practicing their religion in secret even in the 1970s while being part of a Hispanic community.

Melendez was a subject in the 2015 documentary, Rubble Kings, which depicts events leading up to and following the Hoe Avenue peace meeting.

Melendez died May 28, 2017, at the age of 64.

== Authored works ==
- Melendez, Benjamin; Chalfant, Henry; Chang, Jeff (2007). "9 Ghetto Brother Power: The Bronx Gangs, the Beatles, the Aguinaldo, and a Pre-History of Hip-Hop". Listen Again: A Momentary History of Pop Music. Durham, NC US: Duke University Press. pp. 150–156. doi:10.1515/9780822390558-010. ISBN 9780822390558. S2CID 192075015.
