= Dunia Elvir =

Honduran journalist

- Dunia Elvir speaking at the 2026 conference of the National Association of Hispanic Journalists

Dunia Elvir (born June 9, 1973 in La Ceiba, Honduras) is a television journalist, producer, motivational speaker and autism advocate.

== Early life and education ==
Dunia has 2 brothers Orlando and Carlos Elvir. She is the oldest, Orlando is 5 years younger, and Carlitos (as Dunia calls her younger brother) is 8 years younger than her. Her mother took under her care two cousins, Claudia and Maricela, who became the sisters Dunia always wanted to have. Growing up in Barrio La Isla in La Ceiba, Dunia played soccer and "bate" (baseball) in the street. Dunia was 6 years old when her father bought her first microphone and radio. Dunia enjoyed playing and pretending to be an announcer.

At 15 years old, Dunia was sent to Los Angeles, California, to live with her maternal grandmother. She went to Jordan High School in Los Angeles and earned her high school diploma as an ESL (English as a Second Language) student. Later, she earned her broadcast degree at the American Communication Institute in Hollywood in 1991. Like many other immigrants, Dunia faced many challenges while trying to excel in her career. Dunia graduated with a limited knowledge of English. This and the lack of immigration documents prevented her from continuing her higher education. In 1992, her first son, Jesus, was born. Jesus has autism; this made her choose home life to take care of him. In 1997 Dunia's second son Lalo (Eduardo) was born. A few years later, this first marriage had a rocky patch, and the couple separated in July 2001 when Dunia left the house with her two children. On April 12, 2003 Dunia married Carl Procida.

In December 2004 Dunia decided to start college, this idea was a mutual dream of her and her husband. While trying to accomplish their higher education as a couple, Dunia and Carl had two girls. Adrianna and Josieanna came to make the relationship even stronger. By November 2008, Dunia and Carl graduated from the University of Phoenix with a Bachelor's in Business Management. This educational goal allowed Dunia to grow within Telemundo. At this point, Telemundo is not only providing Dunia with the opportunity to work and fulfill her dream profession but is also helping her to grow intellectually, allowing her to go back to college and pursue her MBA, which Dunia completed in November 2011, and with her husband as her classmate.

== Career ==
Elvir started her career in California in Mexican radio in 1989. She later moved to KRCA Channel 62 as a reporter and TV news presenter in Los Angeles.

Since 2001, she has worked for Telemundo in Los Angeles. She was also a correspondent on the TV program Cada día con Maria Antonieta (Every day with Maria Antonieta Collins). Elvir also reports for Telemundo Network shows Levantate Al Rojo Vivo, Noticiero Telemundo and the Los Angeles morning show "Buenos Dias".

In 2014, Elvir was the only female in California's gubernatorial debate between Governor Jerry Brown and Neel Kashkari in Sacramento. This was the first time a Hispanic female was a moderator in the Golden State gubernatorial debate. Elvir also moderated the World Leaders event, where Prime Minister Tony Blair and Vicente Fox discussed immigration, education, and politics, among other topics. She has interviewed Anthony Hopkins, Benicio del Toro, Sylvester Stallone, Salma Hayek, Arnold Schwarzenegger, Vicente Fox, Tony Saca, former US treasurer Rosario Marin, former President of Honduras Ricardo Maduro and his ex-wife Aguas Santas Ocaña Navarro, former Honduran President Jose Manuel Zelaya Rosales and first Lady Xiomara de Zelaya, Alvaro Colom Caballeros, Guatemala's former President and current Honduras President Juan Orlando Hernandez among other Latin American Presidents and Los Angeles former Mayor Antonio Villaraigosa.

On 2006, she traveled to Central America to work on various special reports on El Salvador, Honduras and Guatemala. She also covered el Cucuy de la Mañana's "Votos por America" tour.

Dunia went to Mexico and reported on the terrible accident at the Pasta de Conchos mine in 2006. In 2006, millions of people participated in protests over a proposed change to US immigration policy, Dunia was in the heart on Los Angeles, CA covering this massive protest to the world as Telemundo Network Correspondent. She also covered other significant events like 9/11 and the 2008 historic US Presidential election.

== Recognitions ==
Elvir has received many recognitions because she reported on human interest stories.

Elvir has won 18 Emmy Awards. She was also nominated for an Emmy Award in the category of Best Investigative Report in Los Angeles in 2001. She also won One Gold Telly Award, one Edward Murrow, and 3 "Golden Mike", including one with her report Corners of Sin as the Best Investigative Report of the Year.

Elvir has received various special recognitions from the Los Angeles City, Los Angeles County, and the California State Senate;. She was also awarded special recognition from the California State Assembly and members of the US Congress.

She also won the National GLAAD Award in 2005.

She was invited as a special guest to visit the White House by The National Association of Latina Leaders (NALL).

In 2006, she received the "Distinguished Award Visitor" from the city of La Ceiba, where the 2006 Miss Honduras beauty pageant took place. Up until that point, she was virtually unknown in her own country.

In August 2007, she received the "Journalist of the Year" Award in Toronto, Ontario, Canada at the "Toni Reyes Summer Festival" where over 70 thousand Hispanics from different nationalities gathered to celebrate.

On September 20, 2007, she received from the Camara de Comercio e Industria de Tegucigalpa (Tegucigalpa Chamber of Commerce and Industry) the "Orgullo Hondureño en el Extranjero" Award for her community service and the positive impact on other Hondurans in the United States.

In 2008, Dunia's story "Danger in Hospitals" was selected by NAHJ (National Association of Hispanic Journalists) as the best Investigative report of the year, recognition she received in Washington D.C.

Dunia received the Los Angeles Press Club Award for "Best Public Service Program", a 30-minute piece.

In 2011, Dunia was awarded the "NBC Ovation Award" for the Above and Beyond distinction. These are just a few of the many acknowledgments Dunia has received during the last 20 years.

From September 15, 2023 – August 17, 2025, she was one of seven Latinas profiled in the Smithsonian Institution's National Museum of American History's exhibit "¡De última hora!: Latinas Report Breaking News."

On July 13, 2024, Elvir was elected president of the National Association of Hispanic Journalists.
