= Anthony Ortega (musician) =

American jazz musician (1928–2022)

- Also known as: Tony Ortega
- Born: Anthony Robert Ortega; June 7, 1928; Los Angeles, California, U.S.
- Died: October 30, 2022 (aged 94) Encinitas, California, U.S.
- Genres: Jazz
- Instruments: Clarinet, saxophone, flute

Anthony Robert "Tony" Ortega (June 7, 1928 – October 30, 2022) was an American jazz clarinetist, saxophonist, flutist and studio musician.

== Early life ==
Anthony Robert Ortega was born in Los Angeles, California on June 7, 1928. He grew up in the Watts area. He attended Jordan High School, a school where many other musicians such as Buddy Collette, Charles Mingus and Jackie Kelso at one time attended. He was also part of the school band during his time there. He began to play the saxophone at age fourteen and later studied the instrument under Lloyd Reese. A year after starting alto saxophone, he took up the clarinet. and later the flute, learning both in his five years with Reese.

Ortega`s bandmate in Lloyd Reese`s practice orchestra included another Reese pupil, Eric Dolphy. He was heavily-influenced by and introduced to musicians by his cousin, Ray Vasquez who had suggested he study with Reese. Ortega credited Reese with giving him a rounded music education while teaching him the technical skills needed to play within large and small jazz groups.

As a teen, Ortega was often allowed to sit-in with jazz musicians at jam sessions in Central Avenue clubs, where L.A.'s African American culture and jazz was centered in the 1940s; playing with musicians such as Dexter Gordon, Wardell Gray, Teddy Edwards and Hampton Hawes.

== Career ==
In 1947, Ortega played with Earle Spencer on a brief tour. From 1948 to 1951, he served in the United States Army playing in army bands while stationed out of San Antonio, Texas. His big break came when he became a member of Lionel Hampton's group (whose members included Clifford Brown, Gigi Gryce, Art Farmer, Quincy Jones and Jimmy Cleveland), replacing the departed Jerome Richardson on alto. He headed east with them and toured Europe in 1951. While in Europe he also recorded with Gryce, Farmer, and Milt Buckner. After the tour was over in 1953, Hampton disbanded (largely due to the band members recording in Europe without his permission) and Ortega worked around the eastern U.S. with Milt Buckner before returning back west.

In 1954 he went to Norway and formed a group with Norwegian players while in Oslo. The Swedish jazz magazine ESTRAD credited him for stimulating the jazz movement in the country. He reunited with his future wife, pianist and vibraphonist Mona Ørbeck in Oslo, having earlier met her on his tour with Lionel Hampton's group. They married later that year.

Upon his return to southern California, he put a band together consisting of Carl Perkins, Monk Montgomery and Chuck Thomson and worked briefly in Los Angeles, but relocated to New York City in late 1955 after touring with organist Louis Rivera. There he recorded with Nat Pierce, Quincy Jones, Ernie Wilkins, Dinah Washington, Johnny Hartman, Billy Taylor, Herbie Mann and Maynard Ferguson. He also worked with Claude Thornhill, Dizzy Gillespie, Max Roach, Clifford Brown and Elliot Lawrence. In 1958, he returned to Los Angeles, where he worked with Paul Bley, Claude Williamson, and the Lighthouse All Stars.

In the 1960s, he played mostly in the Southwest and California, and worked on film soundtracks such as The Pawnbroker (1964). Ortega recorded the soundtrack for the movie Gloria (1980) starring Gena Rowlands. He can be heard playing throughout the movie with Tommy Tedesco on guitar.

He worked with Don Ellis and Gerald Wilson in 1965 and with Lalo Schifrin in 1968. In the early-1970s, he toured internationally with Quincy Jones and continued working with Wilson into the 1980s. He toured and recorded in Paris several times in the 1990s. As of October 2021, he was still performing actively at Mr. Peabody's in Encinitas, California.

Anthony Ortega died on October 30, 2022 in Encinitas, California.

== Discography ==
- A Man and His Horns (1956)
- Chamber Music for Moderns with the Nat Pierce Quintet (Coral, 1957)
- Jazz for Young Moderns (And Old Buzzards, Too) (Bethlehem, 1958?)
- New Dance (Revelation, 1967)
- Permutations (Revelation, 1968)
- A Delanto (Jazz Chronicles, 1976)
- Rain Dance (Discovery, 1978)
- On Evidence (Evidence, 1992)
- Neuf (Evidence, 1996)
- Bonjour (Harmonia Mundi, 2001)
- Scattered Clouds (hatOLOGY, 2001)
- Afternoon in Paris (hatOLOGY, 2007)
