= Ray Vasquez =

American singer and musician (1924–2019)

Ray Vasquez (12 February 1924 – 25 January 2019), also known as Ray Victor, was an American singer, musician, trombonist and actor, and a significant influence on the Latin jazz scene from 1940 through 2019.

== Early life ==
Ray Moreno Vasquez was born in Los Angeles on February 12, 1924, to immigrant parents from Mexico. He was raised primarily by his father, Domingo Vasquez Sr., a Huasteco from San Luis Potosí. Growing up poor during the Great Depression era of the 1930s in the Watts section of Los Angeles, Vasquez attended Jordan High School. He was an academic major and music minor, a member of the track and basketball teams, and a featured soloist (as a tenor) in the a cappella choir. He also played trombone and sang in the high school jazz orchestra. A high school voice teacher spotted his potential and recommended he transfer to Roosevelt High School in East Los Angeles because it was more prestigious and had a better jazz orchestra. Vasquez studied trombone with the renowned Dr. Hiner (first cornetist with John Philip Sousa) in Highland Park.

== World War II ==
Vasquez was drafted into the military after graduating high school. He was sent to the Boeing School of Avionics and was a member of the Army Air Corps. Vasquez received four medals while in service and achieved the rank of sergeant. He was honorably discharged in 1946.

A brick in his name was entered in the Memorial Wall at the General Patton Memorial Museum in Chiriaco Summit, California.

== Education ==
Vasquez attended the Pasadena Playhouse theater on the G.I. Bill. The three-year accredited college offered classes in acting, voice and speech. He studied Shakespeare, theater technique, production, radio, television, dance, makeup and costuming. He graduated with a Theater Arts degree in 1952.

== Music career ==
Ray Vasquez played trombone and sang with many local jazz bands in Los Angeles but soon broke away as a solo artist and began recording and touring. He recorded with Chico Sesma, Eddie Cano and on The Voodoo Suite with Perez Prado.

Vasquez recorded his own album, Ray Vasquez: In the Still of The Night on Tropicana Records with music director George Hernandez and produced by Oliver Berliner. The thirty-five-piece band behind him included musicians such as Paul Lopez and Anthony Ortega.

Ray was asked by numerous band leaders such as Chico Sesma, Eddie Cano, Perez Prado, Louis Prima, John T Williams, to be the vocalist on single releases recorded on Gold Star Records, Bean Monde, Accent Records (US), and RCA Records labels.

His role in the development of the Latin music scene in Los Angeles is cited in the books Mexican American Mojo by Anthony Macias and Barrio Rhythm: Mexican American Music in Los Angeles by Steven Joseph Loza. His album and other recordings have been entered in the Arhoolie Foundation's Strachwitz Frontera Collection of Mexican and Mexican American Recordings at the University of California Los Angeles’ Chicano Studies Research Center.

Vasquez was a member of the musicians Union for over 30 years.

== Las Vegas ==
During the early 1960s, Vasquez hit the Las Vegas circuit and was met with success and opportunity. He sang at the Stardust Resort and Casino, the Dunes (Sky Room), The Sands, the Aladdin Hotel and Casino (Big Room), the Flamingo (Lounge), the Tropicana (Lounge), Harrah’s Lake Tahoe South Shore Room, where he worked for four years 1960-1964 without ever auditioning after being discovered at the Silver Slipper by Bill Harrah’s wife Scherry Harrah. He shared the bill with artists including Sammy Davis Jr., Harry Belafonte, Red Skelton, Jack Benny, Liberace, Ella Fitzgerald, Louis Prima, Dorthy Louden, Kay Starr, Jimmy Durante, George Burns, George Gobel, Danny Kaye, Mickey Rooney, Judy Garland, Mitzi Gaynor, Sophie Tucker, Eleanor Powell, Danny Thomas, Myron Cohen, Dianah Shore, Rosemary Clooney, Patti Page, Polly Bergan, Donald O'Conner, Juliet Prowse, The Mills Brothers, Billy Eckstine, George Tapps, Harold Minsky, George Marrow, Bill Cosby, Nat King Cole, The Kingston Trio, Dorothy Dorben, Don Arden and Billy Daniels.

Ray Vasquez also had years of work at Harrah's Lounge and the big room at Harvey's Resort Lounge in Lake Tahoe.

He met his future wife Renee (Renee Victor) in Lake Tahoe and Las Vegas when she was the "front girl" with Perez Prado's orchestra.

== International success ==
His career took off internationally in the late 1960s. Vasquez and his wife traveled to Paris to rehearse "Lido de Paris" and went on to perform in countries including Japan, Taiwan, Singapore, Venezuela, Cuba, the Philippines, Jamaica and Australia.

Vasquez and his wife worked for four years in Australia. Taped in Perth, their television series on the Nine network The Ray and Renee Show created an American sensation in Australia.

== TV and film ==
Upon his return to the United States in the 1970s, Vasquez continued his acting career. He worked in television, radio and film; and co-hosted the KTLA talk show Pacesetters.

Vasquez was an active member of Screen Actors Guild for over 30 years.

== Retirement years ==
In his retirement, Vasquez continued to emcee and sing in ballrooms and country clubs. He continued acting, booking commercials and print work into his senior years, and received residual payments from his acting career until his death.

== Death ==
Vasquez sang with a piano accompanist until he was 94. In 2018, he suffered a heart attack. After one month in rehabilitation, he retired. Ten months later, his health declined rapidly. He died at home on January 25, 2019, with his daughters and family surrounding him, two weeks shy of his 95th birthday.
