= Watts, Los Angeles =

Watts
- Neighborhood of Los Angeles
- The Watts Towers, created by Simon Rodia

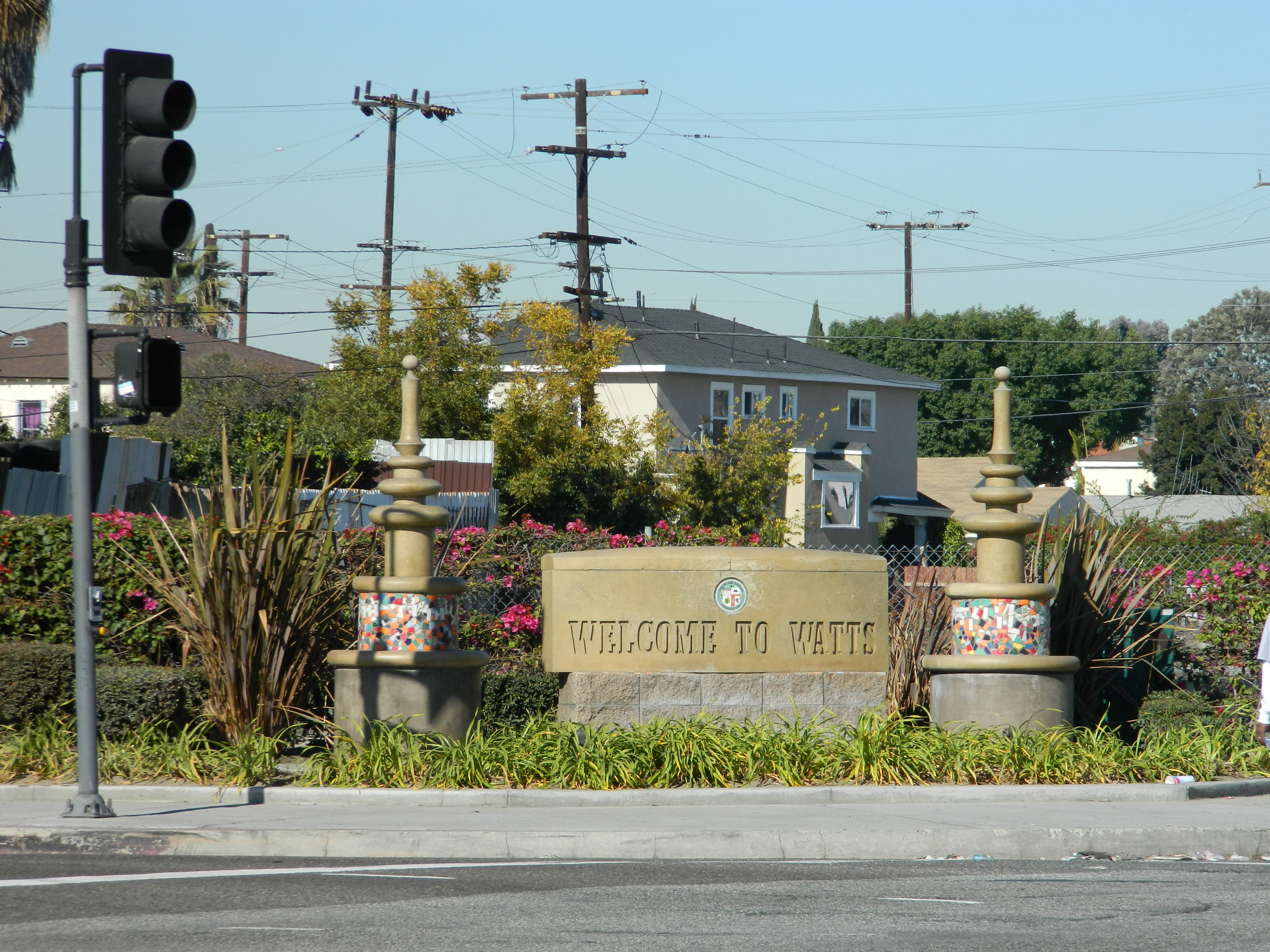
- "Welcome to Watts" sign on Central Avenue

- Location of Watts, Los Angeles Location within Southern Los Angeles Location within Southern California Location within California Location within United States
- Coordinates: 33°56′30″N 118°14′30″W
- Country: United States
- State: California
- County: Los Angeles
- City: Los Angeles

Government
  - City Council: Tim McOsker
  - State Assembly: Mike Gipson (D)
  - State Senate: Steven Bradford (D)
  - U.S. House: Nanette Barragán (D)

Area
  - Total: 2.0 sq mi (5.2 km^{2})

Population (2000)
  - Total: 34,830
  - Density: 17,350/sq mi (6,700/km^{2})
- ZIP Code: 90002, 90059
- Area code: 323
- Website: Watts Neighborhood Council

Watts is a neighborhood in southern Los Angeles, California. It is located within the South Los Angeles region, bordering the cities of Lynwood, Huntington Park and South Gate to the east and southeast, respectively, and the unincorporated community of Willowbrook to the south.

Founded in the late nineteenth century as a ranching community, the arrival of the railroads and the construction of Watts Station saw the rapid development of Watts as an independent city, but in 1926 it was consolidated with Los Angeles. By the 1940s, Watts transformed into a primarily working class African-American neighborhood, but from the 1960s developed a reputation as a low-income, high-crime area, following the Watts riots and the increasing influence of street gangs. Watts has become a predominantly Hispanic neighborhood with a significant African American minority, and remains one of the most impoverished neighborhoods in Los Angeles despite falling crime rates since the 1990s. Notable civic activities by residents of Watts include the "Toys for Watts" toy drive, the Watts Christmas parade, and the "Watts Summer Games" athletic tournament, as well as a local theatre and a dance company, in an effort to improve the neighborhood.

Watts is noted internationally for the landmark Watts Towers by Simon Rodia, which are a Los Angeles Historic-Cultural Monument and also listed on the National Register of Historic Places. The neighborhood has also been featured or referenced in numerous forms of media, particularly West Coast hip-hop music, and movies and television shows set in Los Angeles.

== History ==
=== Founding ===
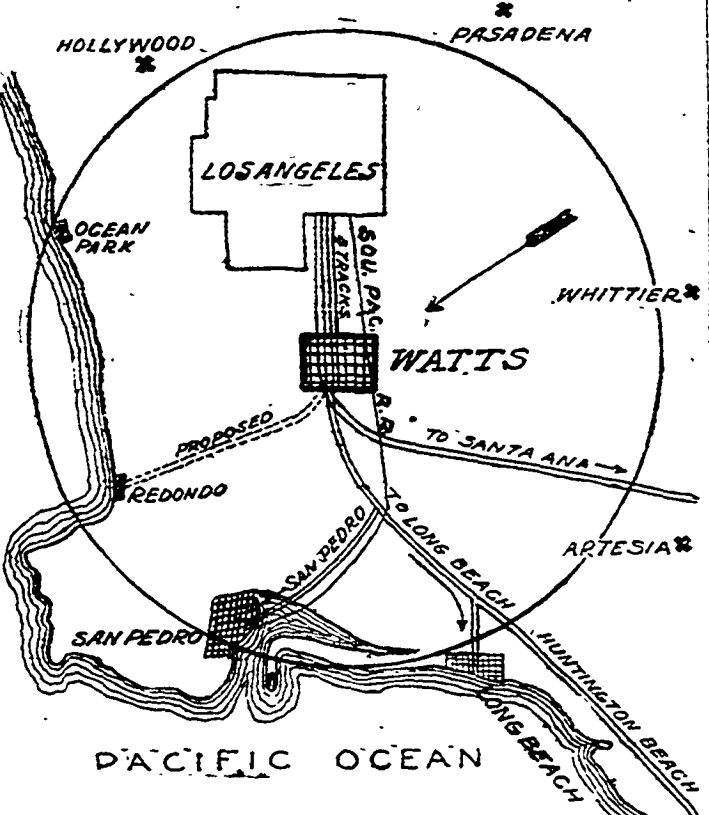
Portion of southwest Los Angeles County, centered on Watts, with railroad lines radiating from it and the Pacific coast marked by the striations, 1910.

The area now known as Watts is situated on the 1843 Rancho La Tajauta Mexican land grant. As on all ranchos, the principal vocation at that time was grazing and beef production. There were household settlers in the area as early as 1882, and in 1904, the population was counted as 65 people; a year later it was 1,651. C.V. Bartow of Long Beach was noted as one of the founders of Watts.

=== Naming ===
In 1904, it was reported that Watts was named after Pasadena businessman Charles H. Watts, who was found dead by suicide in the St. Elmo Hotel, Los Angeles, on August 23 of that year. The Los Angeles Times said: "Watts at one time conducted a livery stable on North Main Street and another at Pasadena and was a man of considerable means. ... Watts station on the Salt Lake road is named after the deceased, and is located on property which he once owned." The Los Angeles Evening Express said: "Among other property he owned a ranch south of the city through which the Salt Lake railroad passes, and the station of Watts is named for him."

In 1919, Watts Mayor Z. A. Towne said that the settlement was named after a widow who lived on ten acres which was later occupied by a Pacific Electric power house. She later moved to Arlington, California, Towne said.

In 1912 and 1913, a movement was afoot to change the name of Watts because, as one headline writer put it, the residents were tired of the "quips and jests" at the town's expense. One real-estate agent said that prospective clients backed out of a property inspection tour when they found out their streetcar ride would end up in Watts. The name "South Angeles" was proposed. Another plan for a city name change surfaced in 1919, when the city trustees asked for suggestions. Mayor Towne said: "Watts has got a bad reputation in Southern California, somehow or other ... a good many of us felt that the liquor element left a black mark upon the community's name. ... Towns are something like people. They can live up to a good name easier than they can live down a bad name."

=== Subdivision ===
A subdivision with the name Watts was platted, possibly by the Golden State Realty Company, between 1903 and 1905, when the settlement had a population of about 150 people. In 1905 lots were being sold by that firm for prices ranging from $100 to $200: The terms were advertised at a dollar as down payment and a dollar a month thereafter, with the company claiming there would be "no interest and no taxes." The Watts Lumber Company had a plan of "easy payments" which "enabled those desiring houses in the little settlement to secure their material and to build and occupy their houses at once."

After 1903, Watts saw the establishment of a newspaper, a general merchandise store, a lumber yard, a grocery store, a millinery, dry goods and confectionery stores, a blacksmithery and bakeries. The Pacific Coast Laundry Company opened in August 1907, with a payroll promised to be between $750 and $1,000 a month. Laundry deliveries were to be made via the electric railway.

=== Cityhood ===
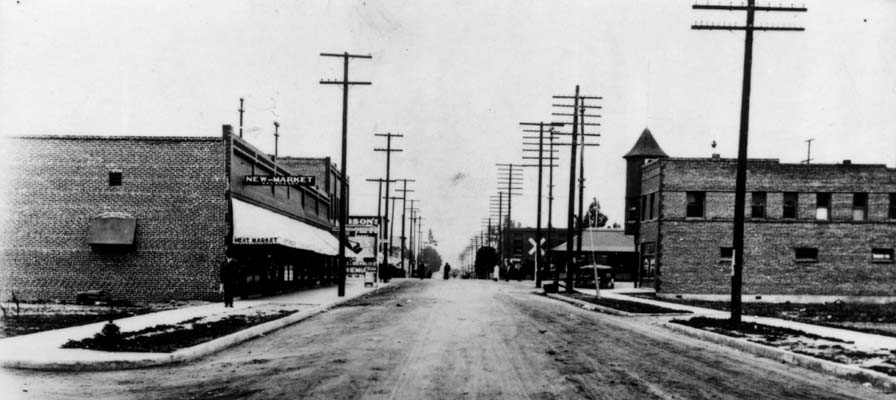
Watts in 1912.

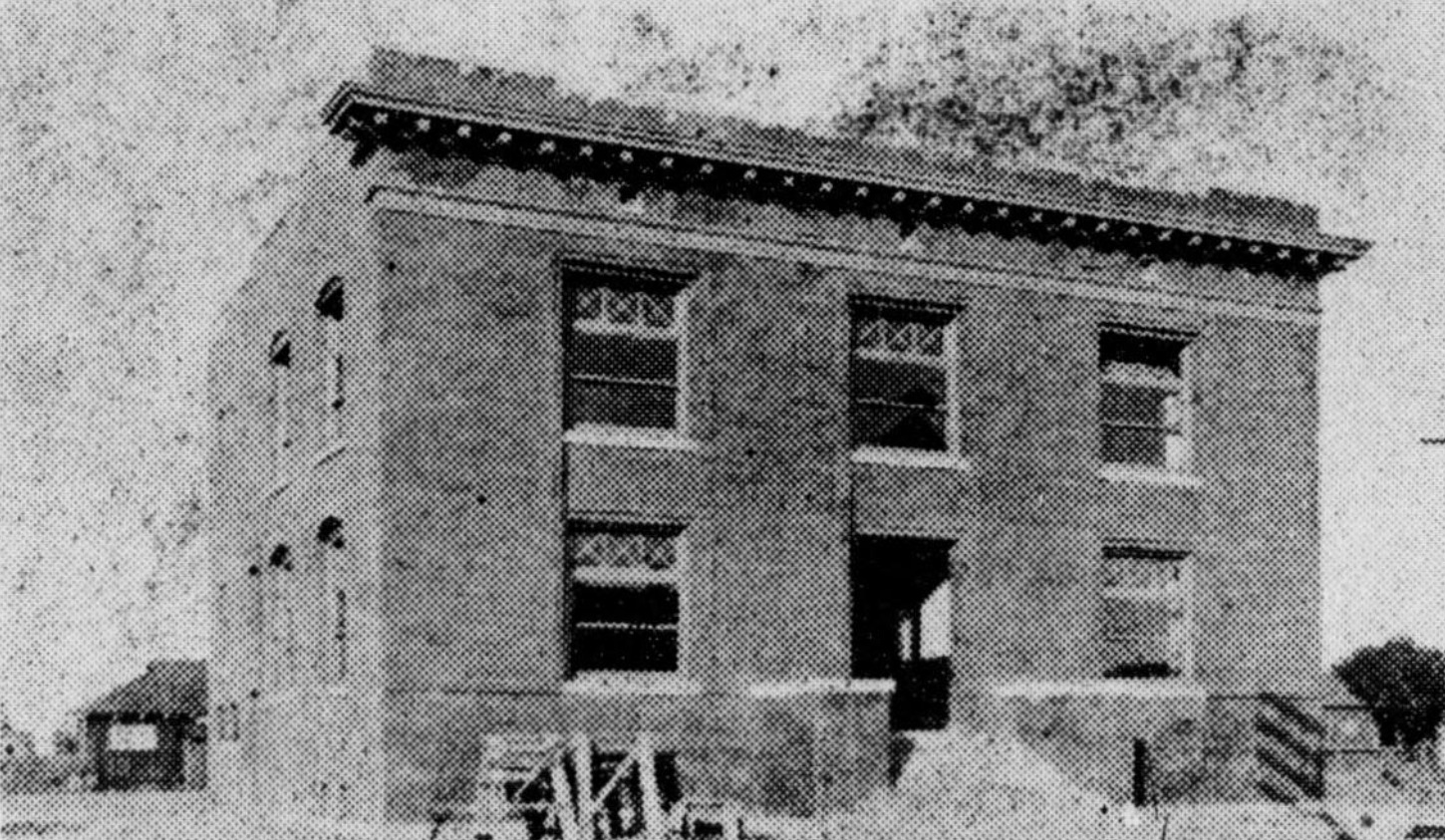
Watts City Hall under construction, 1909.

Watts became a city in 1907, after three petitions objecting to the proposed borders were presented to the Los Angeles County Board of Supervisors. Seven ranchers said that they had no intention of subdividing and that all unimproved land should be omitted from the proposed city. Another petition declared that most of the property owners in Watts did not pay taxes inasmuch as they were buying the 25-foot lots for speculation, that the residents were "migratory" and that most of them were transitory "Mexican railroad laborers." A third petition for exemption was submitted by residents of the Palomar stop, who dressed up their plea with quotations ranging from Greek philosophers to Hamlet. Those petitioners announced that they had recently changed the name of their settlement from "Watts Park" because they did not want any affiliation with Watts.

The City of Watts was approved by voters of the district, and it became a municipality in May 1907, with J. F. Donahue, who was a driver for the Blue Ribbon beer company, as mayor and Frederick J. Rorke as city clerk. There was, however, no money to run the city because it had become incorporated too late to levy and collect any taxes. A proposed business license fee raised so much objection that the Board of Trustees, or the city council, submitted to the people a straw vote (nonbinding) question about allowing liquor to be sold in the city. A majority of the 250 votes did agree that Watts should allow saloons, or bars, and that the municipality should raise money by taxing them. Rorke said:

We have two retail saloons and one wholesale as a result, and an income that more than pays our running expenses. In fact, we have several hundred in the treasury. The voters, who admitted the saloons, looked upon it as a business proposition. While many of them are not really in favor of having them in our midst, the experience was adopted for giving us a working fund. Some of the surplus funds are being used to employ engineers to establish street grades, looking forward to improvements in our thoroughfares in the near future. As an instance of prosperity, there is not a vacant house in Watts, and it is impossible to find one to rent.

Watts was brought to nationwide attention in 1908 with the New York production of a musical comedy called "Lonesome Town," which was set in an imaginary place called Watts, California, in the year 1902. The endeavor, with music by J.A. Rayne and book by Judson D. Brusie, ran for 88 performances at the Circle Theatre, 1825 Broadway, from January 20 through April 24, 1908. It was produced by the vaudeville team of Kolb and Dill – Clarence Kolb and Max Dill.

In response to the raillery occasioned by the play, a "big advertising excursion" took place on Thursday, May 30, 1912, via a special train of three chartered electric railway cars. The route was scheduled over the Balloon Route by way of Los Angeles, Hollywood, the Soldiers' Home, Ocean Park, Venice, Redondo, Gardena and back to Watts. The object of the excursion was to call attention "to the fact that Watts has been 'born again,' and the name 'Lucky Watts' will be used as much as possible, the idea being to get new ideas into people's heads, so they will get away from the notion that there is any joke about what the people here believe is the most promising suburban community in the county." Some 25,000 pieces of advertising material were distributed. The excursion was repeated in 1913.

By 1910, Watts had a population of about 2,500, "well improved streets, a fire department, a weekly newspaper" (the Watts Advertiser), and it was completing a $12,000 city hall. It had "the best of public schools, churches of the leading denominations, the principal fraternal orders, a chamber of commerce and a good government league." That year, business enterprises included the California Gold Recovery Company, which manufactured a machine used in mining districts to capture "flour gold," which is fine gold floating on a liquid surface. In 1925, Watts had a pump-manufacturing plant, a machine shop, two sash-and-door plants, and a pickle works. There was a steel plant, McClintic Marshal Company, which covered fifteen acres and employed 180 men. A new California Thorn Cordage factory was set to hire five hundred men. A new 34-room hotel was going up on West Main Street.

=== Joining Los Angeles ===
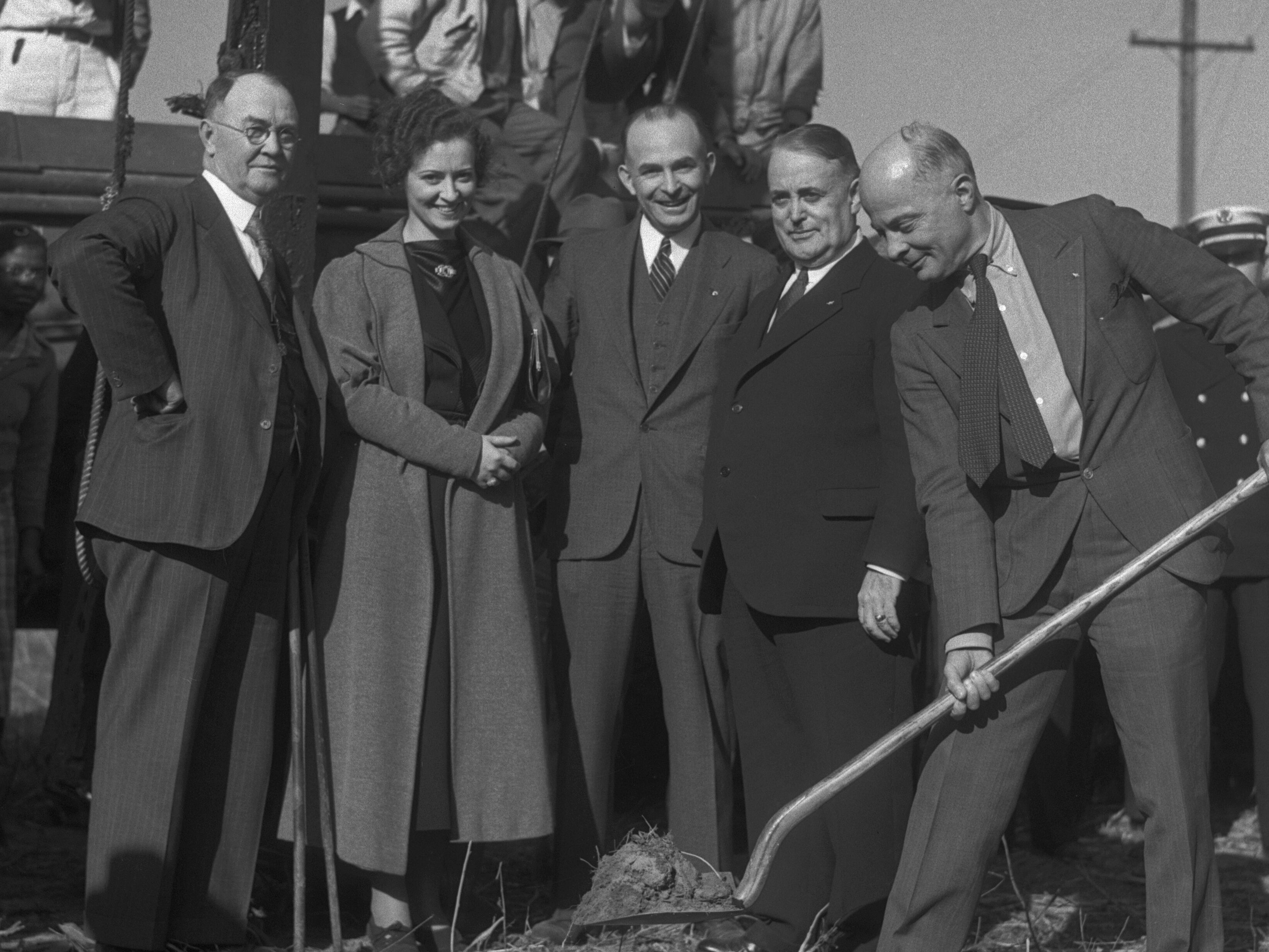
Councilman F. P. Buyer (far left) and Mayor Frank Shaw (second from right) at a groundbreaking ceremony at Watts City Hall, 1936.

In a special election on April 2, 1926, Watts residents decided to enter Los Angeles by a vote of 1,338 to 535. It was the heaviest vote ever in Watts, with 1,933 voters at the polls of the 2,513 registered. Thus 23,000 more people were added to Los Angeles when the decision was put into effect on June 1 of that year. Mayor L.A. Edwards of Watts led the fight for consolidation with Los Angeles. Opposed were the Watts Chamber of Commerce, the Farmers and Merchants Bank, the Taxpayers League, the Ku Klux Klan and the Watts Welfare League. Edwards was re-elected to the outgoing Watts Board of Trustees, the other winners being William Booth, Robert Rhoads and James West.

Watts did not become predominantly black until the 1940s. Before then, there were some African American residents, many of whom were Pullman car porters and cooks. Schoolroom photos from 1909 and 1911 show only two or three black faces among the 30 or so children pictured. By 1914, a black realtor, Charles C. Leake, was doing business in the area. Racially restrictive covenants prevented blacks from living in any other neighborhoods outside of Central Avenue District and Watts.

World War II brought the Second Great Migration, tens of thousands of African American migrants, mostly from Louisiana, Mississippi, Arkansas and Texas, who left segregated Southern states in search of better opportunities in California. During World War II, the city built several large housing projects (including Jordan Downs and Imperial Courts) for the thousands of new workers in war industries. By the early 1960s, these projects had become nearly 100 percent black, as whites moved on to new suburbs outside the central city. As industrial jobs disappeared from the area, the projects housed many more poor families than they had traditionally. Passenger rail service on the Long Beach Line was shut down in 1961, severing the area's primary transportation link to jobs and services in the greater region.

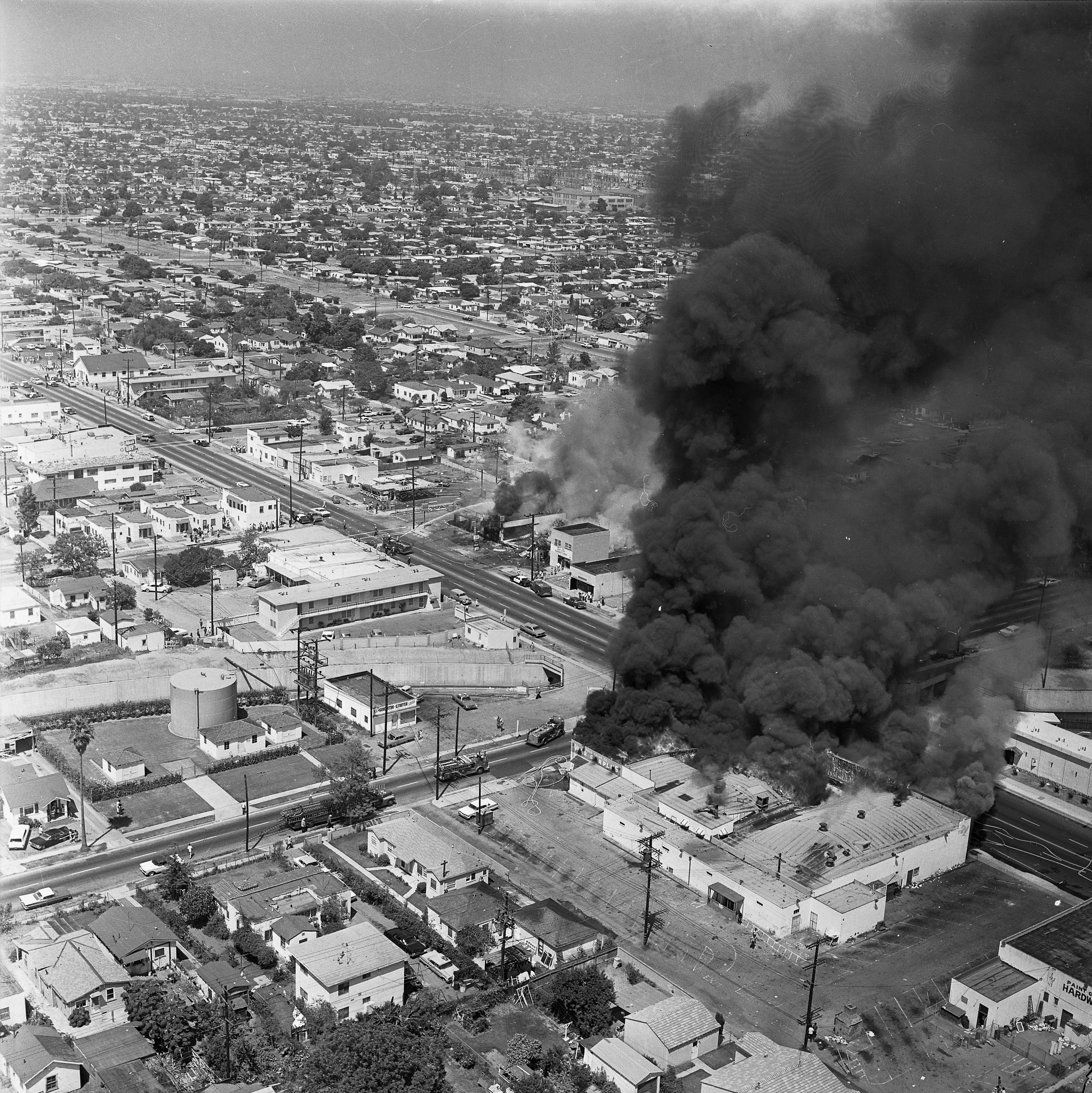
Buildings on fire along Avalon Boulevard at 108th Street during the Watts riots, 1965.

Longstanding resentment by Los Angeles's working class black community over discriminatory treatment by police and inadequate public services (especially schools and hospitals) exploded on August 11, 1965, into what were commonly known as the Watts riots. The event that precipitated the disturbances, the arrest of a black youth by the California Highway Patrol on drunk-driving charges, actually occurred outside Watts.

The damage from the riots was particularly severe along the stretch of 103rd Street between Compton and Wilmington Avenues. 103rd Street was the neighborhood's historic commercial center, consisting of a traditional main street lined with storefronts, easily accessible by foot from Watts Station. After suffering extensive arson in the riots, the ruined, burnt-out area was nicknamed "Charcoal Alley".

An urban renewal plan was drawn up by the redevelopment agency in 1966, with the aim of demolishing all structures between Century Boulevard and 104th Street and redeveloping the area into a modern shopping district. By 1972, the entire area had been acquired and demolished. Century Boulevard, 103rd Street, Compton Avenue, and Wilmington Avenue were all widened into large arterial roads, and the surrounding plots were gradually redeveloped with suburban-style garden apartments and single family subdivisions of much lower density than the previous and surrounding development. The modern shopping center, a main promise of the redevelopment program, was completed in the early 1980's.

This project dramatically altered the urban fabric of Watts, replacing the densely populated, walkable main street with large surface parking lots and wide roads carrying hazardous high speed traffic. Community activism in response these problems would eventually lead to a "green streets" project to improve pedestrian safety and environmental quality in the area, beginning in 2016.

Watts suffered further in the 1970s, as gangs gained strength and raised the level of violence in the neighborhood. Between 1989 and 2005, police reported more than 500 homicides in Watts, most of them gang-related and tied to wars over control of the lucrative illicit market created by illegal drugs. Four of Watts's influential gangs – Watts Cirkle City Piru, Grape Street Watts Crips, Bounty Hunter Watts Bloods, and PJ Watts Crips – formed a Peace Treaty agreement, known as the Watts truce on April 26, 1992. Key hallmarks of the pact continue to influence life in Watts to date, with colors and territory having little to do with gang-related crime.

Beginning in the 1980s, those African Americans who could leave Watts moved to other suburban locations in the Antelope Valley, the Inland Empire, the San Gabriel Valley, Orange County and the San Joaquin Valley. African Americans in Watts have also moved to Southern cities such as Atlanta, Dallas, Houston, Birmingham, Memphis, San Antonio and Jackson. The black population in Watts has been increasingly replaced by other demographic groups, primarily Hispanic immigrants of Mexican and Central American ancestry, as well as by a median proportion of Ethiopian and Indian ancestry. This demographic change accelerated after the 1992 riots.

Neighborhood leaders have begun a strategy to overcome Watts's reputation as a violence-prone and impoverished area. Special promotion has been given to the museums and art galleries in the area surrounding Watts Towers. This sculptural and architectural landmark has attracted many artists and professionals to the area. I Build the Tower, a feature-length documentary film about the Watts Towers and their creator, Simon Rodia, provides a history of Watts from the 1920s to the present and a record of the activities of the Watts Towers Arts Center. Watts is one of several Los Angeles neighborhoods with a high concentration of convicted felons. In 2000, singer and actor Tyrese Gibson chartered a foundation to build a community center in Watts.

In 2019, the Watts Towers were a gathering place along the 25.5-mile (41.0 km) funeral procession from the memorial for Nipsey Hussle at the Staples Center that wound through the streets of South L.A. At times, the crowd flooded the street creating gridlock.

== Geography ==
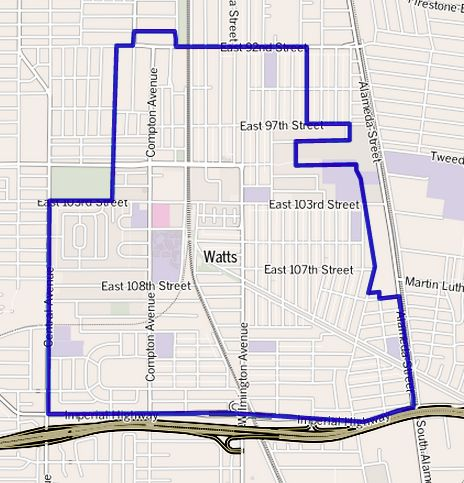
Map of Watts as delineated by the Los Angeles Times

The Mapping L.A. project of the Los Angeles Times states as follows:

The neighborhood's irregular street boundaries follow the Los Angeles city limits on the north and east, except for a small patch of Los Angeles County territory surrounding Ritter Elementary School, between 108th Street and Imperial Highway, which the Times includes in Watts.

The southern boundary runs east–west on Imperial Highway, the eastern line is north–south on Alameda Street and the western line is north–south on Central Avenue to 103rd Street. Ted Watkins Park and other county areas are excluded. Thence the line is Success Avenue between Century Boulevard and 92nd Street.

Watts is flanked on the north by Florence-Firestone, on the east by South Gate, on the southeast by Lynwood, on the south by Willowbrook and on the north and west by Green Meadows.

=== Climate ===
Climate data for Watts, Los Angeles
Month	Jan	Feb	Mar	Apr	May	Jun	Jul	Aug	Sep	Oct	Nov	Dec	Year
Record high °F (°C)	91 (33)	92 (33)	93 (34)	105 (41)	102 (39)	110 (43)	107 (42)	104 (40)	111 (44)	106 (41)	100 (38)	91 (33)	111 (44)
Mean daily maximum °F (°C)	68 (20)	69 (21)	69 (21)	72 (22)	74 (23)	78 (26)	82 (28)	83 (28)	82 (28)	78 (26)	73 (23)	68 (20)	75 (24)
Mean daily minimum °F (°C)	47 (8)	50 (10)	51 (11)	53 (12)	57 (14)	61 (16)	64 (18)	65 (18)	64 (18)	59 (15)	52 (11)	47 (8)	56 (13)
Record low °F (°C)	24 (−4)	31 (−1)	32 (0)	37 (3)	40 (4)	43 (6)	47 (8)	46 (8)	45 (7)	40 (4)	33 (1)	30 (−1)	24 (−4)
Average precipitation inches (mm)	3.23 (82)	3.56 (90)	2.86 (73)	0.71 (18)	0.25 (6.4)	0.08 (2.0)	0.02 (0.51)	0.14 (3.6)	0.29 (7.4)	0.40 (10)	1.14 (29)	1.86 (47)	14.53 (369)

== Demographics ==
A total of 36,815 people lived in Watts's 2.12 square miles, according to the 2000 U.S. census – averaging 17,346 people per square mile, among the highest population densities in Los Angeles. Population was estimated at 41,028 in 2008. The median age was 21, making Watts the Los Angeles neighborhood with the youngest population. The percentages of residents aged birth to 18 were among the county's highest.

Latinos made up 61.6% of the population, Blacks 37.1%, Whites 0.5%, Asian 0.2%, and others 0.5%. Mexico and El Salvador were the most common places of birth for the 34% of the residents who were born abroad, an average percentage of foreign-born when compared with the city or county as a whole.

The $25,161 median household income in 2008 dollars was considered low for the city and county. The percentage of households earning $20,000 or less was high, compared to the county at large. The average household size of 4 people was high for the city. Renters occupied 67% of the housing units, and homeowners occupied the rest.

In 2000, there were 2,816 families headed by single parents, or 38.9%, the highest rate for any neighborhood in the city. The percentages of never-married women (45.3) and never-married men (44.7) were among the county's highest.

In 2000, there were 739 military veterans, or 3.6% of the population, low when compared to the rest of the city.

== Government ==
=== Local ===
Watts Neighborhood Council 10221 Compton Avenue, Suite 106A, LA CA 90002.

Los Angeles Fire Department Station 65 (Watts) serves the community.

Los Angeles County Fire Department Station 16 (Watts) serves the community.

Los Angeles Police Department operates the nearby Southeast Community Police Station.

=== County, state, federal ===
The Los Angeles County Department of Health Services operates the South Health Center in Watts.

The California Department of Corrections and Rehabilitation operates the L.A. Watts Juvenile Parole Center.

The United States Postal Service Augustus F. Hawkins Post Office is located at 10301 Compton Avenue. On January 24, 2000, the United States House of Representatives and the United States Senate presented a bill to rename the Watts Finance Office as the Hawkins Post Office.

== Education ==
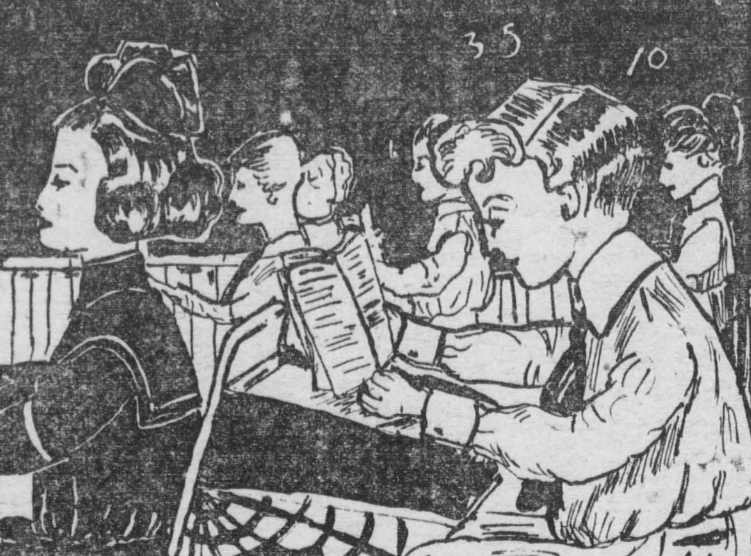
Classroom sketch by Edna Schye of Watts, 1909.

There was a school in Watts from an early date. In 1905 it was reported that "steps have already been taken to enlarge the present school building", and a new building was erected in 1911 at a cost of $30,000. By 1914, however, that structure had become overcrowded, and additional desks were "installed everywhere, in the library, in the halls and in the auditorium." There were 630 pupils and 18 teachers. While work was under way on a new school, the contractor absconded with some of the money and his bondsman was compelled to finish the job. Older students attended Redondo Union High School. Later, Watts was a part of the Compton School District, but in January 1914, a mass meeting was held in Watts to make plans to secede from Compton and build a new high school in Watts, at a cost of about $100,000. Later the same month, Watts boosters made the same statement at a meeting with Compton backers in that city. By 1925 Watts voters had approved $170,000 in bonds for a new high school, and the town was served by four public grammar schools and one Catholic school. There were seven grade schools.

Just 2.9% of Watts residents aged 25 and older had earned a four-year degree, according to the 2000 census, which is considered a low figure for both the city and the county. The percentage of those residents with less than a high school diploma was high in comparison with the county at large.

=== Schools ===
Schools within Watts are as follows:

- Jordan Senior High School, LAUSD, 2265 East 103rd Street
- Animo College Prep Academy, Green Dot Public Schools, 2265 East 103rd Street
- Thomas Riley High School, LAUSD alternative, 1524 East 103rd Street
- Alliance Cindy & Bill Simon Technology High School, charter school, 10720 South Wilmington Avenue
- Verbum Dei High School, private, 11100 South Central Avenue
- Simon Rodia Continuation School, LAUSD, 2315 East 103rd Street
- Edwin Markham Middle School, LAUSD, 1650 East 104th Street
- Ninety-Sixth Street Elementary School, LAUSD, 1471 East 96th Street
- St. Lawrence of Brindisi Elementary School, 10044 Compton Avenue
- Weigand Avenue Elementary School, LAUSD, 10401 Weigand Avenue
- Dorothy V. Johnson Community Day School, LAUSD, 10601 South Grandee Avenue
- San Miguel Catholic School, private elementary, 2270 East 108th Street
- Lovelia P. Flournoy Elementary School, LAUSD, 1630 East 111th Street
- Grape Street Elementary School, LAUSD, 1940 East 111th Street
- Ritter Elementary School, LAUSD, 11108 Watts Avenue
- Ninety-Second Street Elementary School, LAUSD, 9211 Grape Street
- Alain Leroy Locke College Preparatory Academy, Green Dot Public Schools grades 9–12, 325 East 111th Street
- Compton Avenue Elementary School, 1515 East 104th Street
- 112th Street Elementary School, E 112th St, Los Angeles, CA 90059

King Drew Magnet High School of Medicine and Science opened in bungalows of Jordan in 1982. In 1999 it moved to a standalone campus in Willowbrook.

In May 2013, Wiegand Avenue Elementary School became the first school in California from which a principal was ordered to be removed in response to the state's 2010 "trigger law," which compels the dismissal of a school administrator on petition of a majority of parents. As a result of the pending loss of principal Irma Cobian, 21 of 22 teachers asked for transfer to other schools.

=== Public libraries ===
A Watts public library was established in 1913, with Maud Walton as the first librarian and Bessie Hunt as the second. In the same year the city received word that its application for construction of a new Carnegie Library had been approved. The cornerstone of the library was laid in January 1914. In 1914 the library moved into a newly built Carnegie library. Los Angeles annexed Watts in 1926, so the library became the Watts Branch of the Los Angeles library system. In 1957 voters approved a library branch bond, and a 3,600 square feet (330 m^{2}) Watts Branch opened in 1960. In 1991 the Los Angeles City Council approved a measure, backed by the Friends of the Watts Branch Library, the 15th District Council Office, and the Community Redevelopment Agency (CRA) of the City of Los Angeles, to build a new library as a part of the 1.3 acres (0.53 ha) Watts Civic Center. $1.3 million from Proposition 1, the branch library facility bond issue of 1989, funded the construction of the new Watts library. On June 25, 1996, the city council voted to name the library after Alma Reaves Woods, a woman in the community who encouraged reading and library usage. James C. Moore, AIA & Associates designed the current Watts Library, which opened on June 29, 1996. Los Angeles Public Library operates the Alma Reaves Woods–Watts Branch.

== Community service ==
=== CicLAvia Tour ===
On January 22, 2012, the popular cycling event called CicLAvia took place in south L.A.'s Central–Alameda neighborhood to the Watts Towers. Volunteers were excited to hold an event close to the CicLAvia events in downtown L.A. The event was meant to encourage civic engagement. Throughout the group of volunteers the diversity was large. Cyclists took photos for a "crowd-source" map made up of photos and recordings by the cyclists.

=== Watts Re-Imagined ===
Watts Re:Imagined is a local urban planning initiative led by Grant Housing Economic Development Corps (Grant EDC, a non-profit division of the community-based Grant AME church) and the Natural Resources Defense Council (NRDC) Urban Solutions program. Its mission is to help the community of Watts realize their full potential by promoting economic opportunity, social equity, public health, and an improved quality of life, all while working with community leaders to preserve the identity of the area. It is trying to achieve this goal by implementing different existing plans proposed for the area. The Watts Re:Imagined initiative was formed in response to the dissolution of the Community Redevelopment Agency of Los Angeles.

== Parks and recreation ==
The following recreation facilities are within the Watts boundaries:

- Watts Senior Citizen Center, 1657 East Century Boulevard
- 109th Street Recreation Center, 1464 East 109th Street. The center, which acts as a Los Angeles Police Department stop-in center, has an auditorium, a lighted baseball diamond, lighted indoor and outdoor basketball courts, a children's play area, a lighted football field, an indoor gymnasium with weights, an outdoor gymnasium without weights, a lighted soccer field, and lighted tennis courts. The 109th Street Pool is a seasonal outdoor unheated pool. In June 2008, a group of young men attacked a manager there, forcing the city to close the pool for a short period of time. When it re-opened, police were stationed there. The pool, located between the Nickerson Gardens and Jordan Downs public housing complexes, also lay between two competing gangs in 2008.

== Attractions ==
=== Watts Towers ===
The Watts Towers or Towers of Simon Rodia is a collection of 17 interconnected structures, two of which reach heights of over 99 feet (30 m). The Towers were built by Italian immigrant construction worker Sabato ("Sam" or "Simon") Rodia in his spare time over a period of 33 years, from 1921 to 1954. The work is an example of non-traditional vernacular architecture and American Naïve art.

=== Watts Station ===
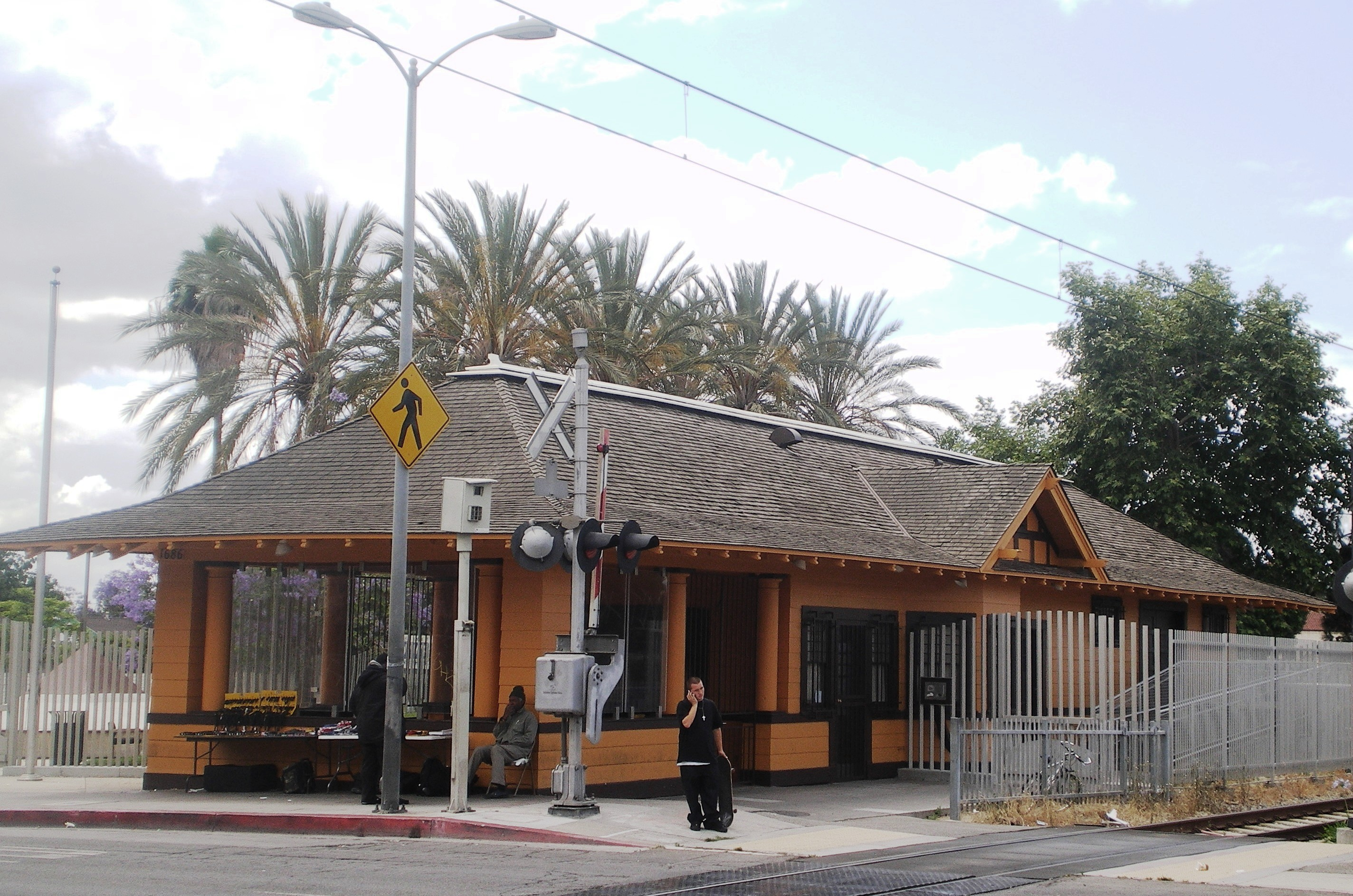
Watts Station in 2008.

The Watts station was a train station built in 1904. It is a National Historic Landmark. It has been known as one of the few structures that were untouched by a huge fire along 103rd Street stores during the 1965 Watts riots. When it was found intact, it was a symbol of hope and faith for the Watts community. Being one of the most original buildings that was first constructed in Watts, it was a popular stop for the Pacific Electric Railway's "Red Car" that ran through Los Angeles, CA, to Long Beach, CA, for 50 years. It was also admitted to the NRHP (National Register of Historic Places) four months after the riots.

=== Watts Christmas Parade ===
The Watts Christmas parade was created in 1964 by Edna Aliewine before the Watts riots. She put together a group of local volunteers to fundraise and create the parade. Ms. Aliewine started a drill team with neighborhood girls which marched in homemade Santa hats. She died at the age of 90 in her home in Watts on July 5, 2011.

=== Watts Summer Games ===
The L.A. Watts Summer Games started in 1968 and were held at Locke High School. The games are a three-day athletic tournament that brings together more than 5,000 students from 200 California schools. Almost 200,000 youth have competed in the games over the past 30 years. The Watts Summer Games have a scholarship program for students who are dedicated to the community and have awarded more than $300,000 since their inception in 1992.

== Performing arts ==
=== Dance ===
Epifani Dance Company was founded by Lakesha Buchanon in Watts in 2002. They compete in year-round SHARP International competitions, where they have won several first-place trophies.

=== Theater ===
Located on 107th Street, the Watts Village Theater Company is a multicultural urban company whose mission is to "inspire its community with an appreciation of all cultures." The company was started in 1996 and has been involved in helping the community with educational workshops ever since. The members strive to make a more understanding Watts whose citizens can harmoniously live together in a diverse community.

== Newspapers ==
The L.A. Watts Times Weekender Newspaper is an African American newspaper in both print form and online. It was started in 1965 with the motto: "The Voice of Our Community Speaking for Itself." In 2010 the Bakewell family negotiated to purchase the LA Watts Times. Danny Bakewell said, "I am proud and honored that Melanie chose me and my family to continue the great legacy of the Watts Times, its founders and her parents."

LA Youth, a bimonthly newspaper written by and for teenagers, was published between 1988 and 2013. It had a satellite office in Watts.

== In popular culture ==
=== Music ===
Watts, along with several other California areas, is referenced in the hip-hop songs "California Love" by 2Pac featuring Dr. Dre & Roger Troutman, and "Creep N Crawl" by Eazy E, although in the former, Watts is referenced erroneously as a "city", when in actuality is just a neighborhood within the city of Los Angeles. The neighborhood is also mentioned in the Avalanches' 2016 song "Wildflower", which features the opening lyric: "Jim Keranga of Watts, California, is eating a bowl of ethereal cereal"—a sample from the 1969 film Putney Swope.

For five years, the record label Top Dawg Entertainment has hosted a Christmas benefit concert in the Nickerson Gardens Housing Projects. The free concert draws tens of thousands of attendees and includes performances from TDE artists SZA, Kendrick Lamar, and Jay Rock, who was raised in the Nickerson Gardens Housing Projects.

=== Television and film ===
- The television series Sanford and Son was set in Watts, and the neighborhood was mentioned prominently by the characters.
- Roy Scheider and Daniel Stern crash a police helicopter into a construction site in Watts in the 1983 movie Blue Thunder.
- The television series Two and a Half Men had an episode called "Weekend in Bangkok with Two Olympic Gymnasts", which makes reference to Watts in a brief scene. The show also features a restaurant called “Clucky's” located in Watts in the same episode.
- A plot in the film The Big Lebowski involves the embezzlement of a million dollars from a foundation that ensures a college education for youngsters from Watts, the so-called Little Lebowski Urban Achievers.
- The film Menace II Society was filmed at the Jordan Downs public housing project in Watts.
- Charles Burnett's Killer of Sheep was filmed in and is set in Watts in the early 1970s.
- Wassup Rockers was filmed in Watts, and parts were filmed at Locke High School and Gompers Middle School.
- Portions of the Oscar award-winning movie Training Day were filmed in and around the Imperial Courts public housing project in Watts.
- The television series What's Happening!! and its sequel What's Happening Now!! was set in Watts, where the characters lived.
- The reality television series Pit Boss filmed a Season 1 episode in which Shorty Rossi returns to his community to do a fundraiser for the kids of the Nickerson Gardens public housing project in Watts.
- The episode of Quantum Leap "Black on White on Fire" was set in Watts during the riots in 1965.
- Watts tower is a notable location in the movie Ricochet (1991) with Denzel Washington and John Lithgow.

=== Video games ===
- Imperial Courts which is located in Watts, appears in the video game Grand Theft Auto: San Andreas where it is parodied as Ganton Courts.
- The neighborhood of Rancho also resembles Watts, as it appears in the video game Grand Theft Auto V.

== Notable people ==
- 03 Greedo, rapper
- P. P. Arnold, singer
- Bambu, rapper
- Arna Bontemps, poet and novelist of the Harlem Renaissance
- Don Cherry, jazz musician
- Dr. Dre, rapper, record producer, and entrepreneur
- Robert C. Farrell (born 1936), journalist and member of the Los Angeles City Council, 1974–1991; Watts newspaper publisher
- Shawn Fonteno (actor)
- Nipsey Hussle, rapper, activist, and entrepreneur
- Tyrese Gibson, R&B singer and actor
- Florence Griffith-Joyner, Olympic track and field gold medalist; raised in the Jordan Downs projects
- "Sweet Alice" Harris, community organizer; founder and executive director of local youth outreach group Parents of Watts
- Etta James, singer
- Glasses Malone, rapper; born in Watts
- Imarjoe Miller, professional boxer; born in Watts
- Charles Mingus, jazz musician, composer, bandleader, and civil rights activist; raised largely in the Watts area
- Walter Mosley, novelist
- Anthony Ortega jazz saxophonist, Smithsonian Honoree, cousin of Ray Vasquez
- Jerron "Blind Boy" Paxton, musician, vocalist and multi-instrumentalist
- Jay Rock, rapper
- Shorty Rossi, reality television star
- Sylvester, disco singer
- Glenn T. Seaborg, chemist, Nobel Prize winner in chemistry
- Ray Vasquez Singer, Trombonist, Actor, Jordan High School Watts
- JuJu Watkins, basketball player
- Barry White, R&B singer, actor, and voice artist
- The Watts Prophets, hip-hop/jazz and poetry group
- The Sylvers, family R&B/disco/pop group

== Transportation ==
Watts was situated at a point on a rail line that ran south from Los Angeles (eight miles to the north) to Long Beach and, according to real estate advertisements and publicity releases, was about 6 1/2 minutes from the terminal at Sixth and Main Streets. In 1910 it was a transfer point for the Santa Ana, Long Beach and San Pedro lines of the Pacific Electric system. The Watts Station, which is now a National Historic Landmark, included Wells Fargo Express and Western Union telegraph facilities. Pioneer settler A. E. Ruoff recalled that the electric line was installed about 1902. The point known as Latin Station, just a mile north of Watts station, was called North Watts, and Abila station, 1.5 miles south of Watts, was South Watts (later "Palomar").

Around 1905, a junction was installed for a line that ran to Santa Ana. In February 1909 the railroad changed its schedule so that Watts travelers would have to take local trains rather than expresses, thereby increasing the length of the ride to Los Angeles from 15 minutes to one hour. In 1912 Watts passengers could get a car into Los Angeles about every three minutes, and those returning from the city "have the choice of riding five different lines of cars, not to mention the Watts locals, namely the Long Beach, Santa Ana, San Pedro, Redondo and Newport lines."

In 1925, there were 800 freight and passenger trains stopping in Watts, and "a great number of wide boulevards" passed through the city.

=== Public transportation ===
Watts is currently served by the 103rd Street/Watts Towers station on the LA Metro Rail A Line.

Historically, the neighborhood was served by the Pacific Electric Watts Station and several Pacific Electric lines, including the Watts Line.

== See also ==
- Wattstax
- 1992 Los Angeles riots
