= Rubble Kings =

- Theatrical poster
- Directed by: Shan Nicholson
- Produced by: Michael Aguilar; Dito Montiel; Jim Carrey; Shan Nicholson; Ben Velez; Cristina Esteras
- Starring: Benjamin Melendez; Afrika Bambaataa
- Cinematography: Dan Ribaudo; Shlomo Godder
- Music by: Torbitt Schwartz
- Distributed by: Saboteur Digital
- Release date: June 19, 2015
- Running time: 68 minutes
- Country: United States
- Language: English

Rubble Kings is a 2015 documentary film directed by Shan Nicholson that depicts gang violence in The Bronx in the 1970s, specifically the events leading up to and following the Hoe Avenue peace meeting.

The film premiered at the DOC NYC film festival in New York City on November 16, 2014.

One of the film's producers, actor Jim Carrey, stated the following during a Q&A session after the film's premiere:

The first time I saw the footage, I was completely blown away by this incredible thing that had happened, that no one knows about. A great movement towards peace, about really courageous people overcoming seemingly impossible odds and rising to love. Although I didn't grow up in that situation, I can understand that idea, and I think it's important that we all reach outside our own realms of experience and try to understand what people are going through and the things they have to overcome. It was really something I wanted to get involved with and support in any way I can.

== Reception ==
On the review aggregation website Rotten Tomatoes, the film received a 73% rating based on 15 reviews. Metacritic gave the film a 62 out of 100 based on 11 reviews, indicating "generally favorable reviews".

Daniel M. Gold of The New York Times described the film as "a fascinating, valuable work of social, music and New York history, a celebration of a peaceful revolution by those who helped birth it." Ronnie Scheib of Variety wrote: "Cramming a lot of anecdotes, urban lore and frenzied movement into a mere 71 minutes, Nicholson's docu imperceptibly builds to an unexpected, revelatory climax."

== Soundtrack ==
Rubble Kings: The Album

Soundtrack album by Various Artists
- Released: January 15, 2016
- Genre: Hip-hop
- Length: 41:38
- Label: Mass Appeal Records
- Producer: Little Shalimar

Professional ratings
Review scores
Source	Rating
Pitchfork	7.4/10

With a mix of rap and instrumental compositions, Little Shalimar (Torbitt Schwartz)'s music captures the essence of the varied sounds emerging from the Bronx during the 1970s.

All music is composed by Little Shalimar, Producer.

No.	Title	Featuring	Length
1.	"War"		1:12
2.	"Savage Habits"	Bun B, Killer Mike, Cuz Lightyear	3:48
3.	"Warrior Thing"	eXquire	3:30
4.	"Bouncy 3"	King Mono	4:33
5.	"The Revolution Might Be Televised"		2:45
6.	"Delaney Card"	Ka	3:27
7.	"Edge Of The Edge (Instrumental)"		2:54
8.	"Rubble Kings Theme (Dynamite)"	Run The Jewels	3:42
9.	"Partytime (Jitter Buggin)"		2:22
10.	"Comes With The Territory"		1:16
11.	"Same Damn Thing"	Boldy James, eXquire, Ghostface Killah	4:34
12.	"The Piano District (Gentrification Boogie)"		2:49
13.	"Phoenix"	Roxiny & Tunde Adebimpe	4:46
Total length:			41:38
