= Ghetto Brothers =

New York based Puerto Rican political musical group

- Also known as: The Ghetto Brothers
- Origin: United States; Puerto Rico
- Genres: Funk; Soul; Latin; Latin rock Psychedelic rock Salsa; Garage rock Rock en Español
- Years active: 1964-Present
- Labels: Salsa Records
- Members: Benjamin "Yellow Benjy" Melendez (lead vocals); Victor Melendez (bass); Luis Bristo (drums); Franky Valentin(timbales); Chiqui Concepcion (Congas); Angelo Garcia (Bongos); David Silva (lead guitar); Robert Melendez (rhythm guitar)

The Ghetto Brothers were a gang and music group founded in New York City's South Bronx in the late 1960s with the motivation to uplift young Latino and Black men in their community.

== History ==
Founded in New York City's South Bronx in the late 1960s, the gang eventually spread to much of the Northeastern United States. Like the Young Lords, they were involved in politics, particularly the Puerto Rico independence movement, and were associated with the then-new Puerto Rican Socialist Party. Its members had political motivation to uplift young Latino and Black men in the community.

Under Benjamin Melendez's leadership, the Ghetto Brothers represented one end of the spectrum in terms of how they treated the women involved with the gang. Referred to as the Ghetto Sisters—the respectful term contrasted sharply with the names used for the women attached to other New York gangs of the period—the women were generally viewed as organization members and as girlfriends, whereas many other gangs treated women almost entirely as sexual property.

Former Hartford, Connecticut mayor Eddie Perez was a member of the Ghetto Brothers when young. New York Daily News columnist Robert Dominguez was the leader of a Ghetto Brothers division in the Bronx when he was a teen. In the Connecticut prison system, during the 1990s, the Ghetto Brothers and the Savage Nomads joined to form Los Solidos (the Solid Ones), which is now one of the most powerful Puerto Rican gangs in the state.

== Origin of the Name ==
The name Ghetto Brothers was chosen by Hui Cambrelen one of the original founders along with Ray DelaVega and Benji Melendez.

== Music Group ==
Benjamin Melendez, who left the organization in 1976, was also known as a guitarist. He led a band, also known as the Ghetto Brothers, which included his late brother Victor Melendez on bass. They released one album Ghetto Brothers - Power-Fuerza in 1971, which had only informal, local distribution. It has since been re-released on CD.

== Discography ==
- 1971 – Ghetto Brothers - Power-Fuerza (Salsa Records - SLP 2008) Recorded at Fintone Studio. Produced by Bobby Marin.
