= Nickerson Gardens =

Public housing complex in Los Angeles, California, United States

Coordinates: 33.93229°N 118.24769°W

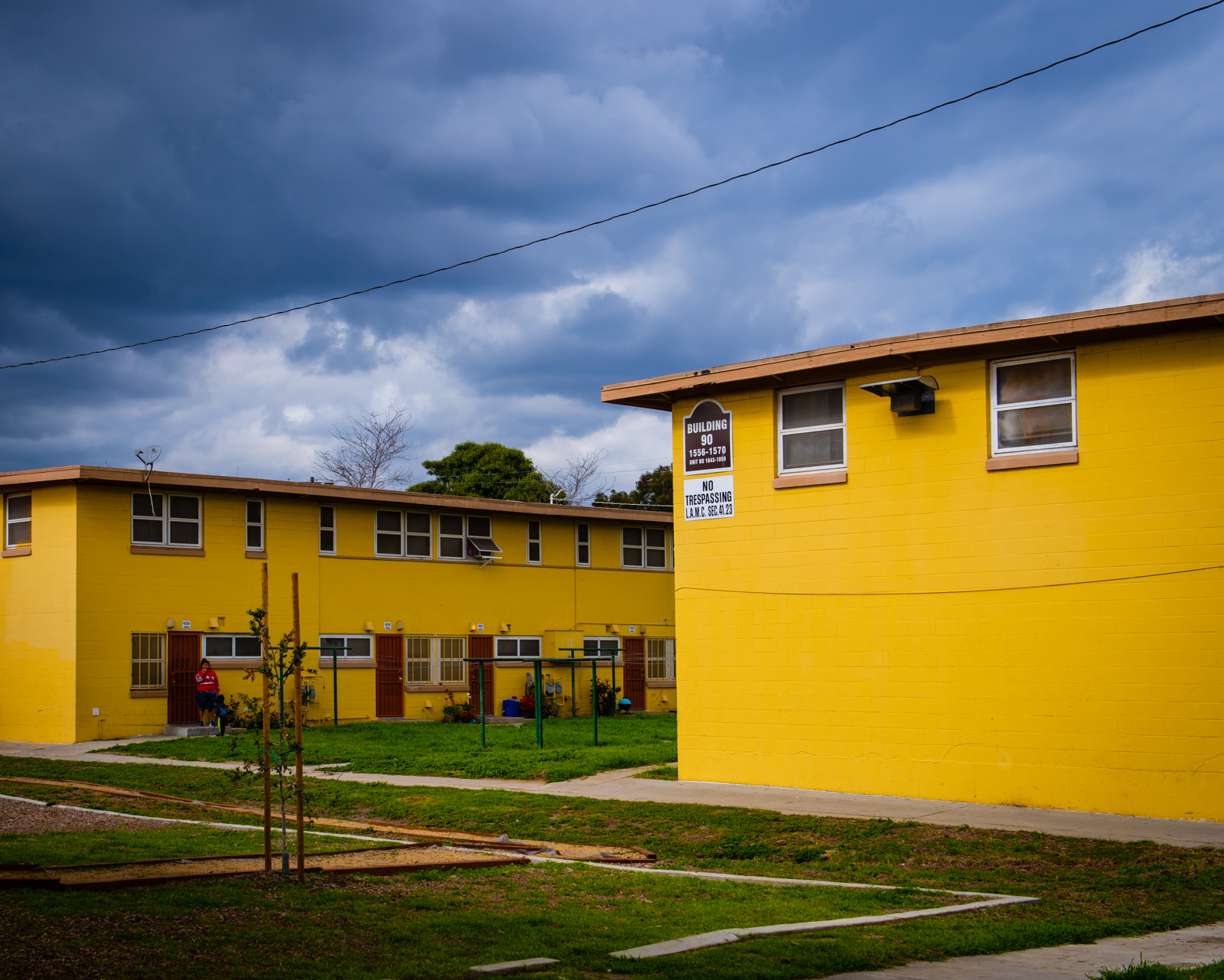
- Nickerson Gardens in 2019
- Interactive map of Nickerson Gardens

General information
- Location: 1590 East 114th Street, Watts, Los Angeles, California, United States
- Status: 1,066 units

Construction
- Constructed: 1954
- Architect: Paul R. Williams

Other information
- Governing body: Housing Authority of the City of Los Angeles

Nickerson Gardens is a 1,066-unit public housing apartment complex at 1590 East 114th Street in Watts, Los Angeles, California, United States. Nickerson Gardens is the largest public housing development in Los Angeles.

== Location ==
The complex occupies the blocks northeast of the corner of Imperial Highway and Central Avenue, and southwest of 111th St and Compton Avenue. It is on the border of both Watts (a district of South Los Angeles) and the Census Designated Place (CDP) of Willowbrook.

== History ==
It was first opened for occupancy in March 1954, although construction was still underway. The original architect was Paul R. Williams. It was named after William Nickerson Jr., the founder and former CEO of Golden State Mutual Life Insurance Company.

In the mid-1970s, Nickerson Gardens was 95% African American; by 2004, the African American population had decreased to 75% and continued to drop.

Nickerson Gardens was occasionally known as the recognized birthplace of the Bounty Hunter Bloods gang. A Los Angeles Times article on November 17, 2007, detailed they were gangs that had patrolled in and around Nickerson Gardens.

In 2023, Nickerson Gardens received a new playground, featuring a gym, a carousel, misting poles and canopies for evaporative cooling, climbing nets, slides, and swings. The bassist of the Red Hot Chili Peppers, Flea, arranged funding for the park, while NBBJ and ESI Design did designwork for the park free of charge. The Watts Gang Task Force spoke at the unveiling, highlighting the park as a measure against gang activity.

== Operation ==
The complex is owned and managed by the Housing Authority of the City of Los Angeles. Nickerson Gardens consists of 156 buildings with townhouse style units made up of single bedroom units.

== Education ==
Nickerson Gardens is assigned to the following Los Angeles Unified School District schools:

- 112th Street Elementary School
- Lovelia P. Flournoy Elementary School
- Markham Middle School
- Jordan High School

== In popular culture ==
Nickerson Gardens has been referenced in many of rapper Kendrick Lamar's songs such as "DUCKWORTH.", "wacced out murals" and "Not Like Us". However, he was not raised in Nickerson. He and his colleagues at Top Dawg Entertainment have held a Christmas Toy Drive every December at Nickerson Gardens since 2014. TDE founder Anthony "Top Dawg" Tiffith and their flagship artist Jay Rock (Johnny McKinzie, Jr.) were both born and raised in Nickerson Gardens.
