= Imperial Courts =

Public housing project in Los Angeles, California, United States

Coordinates: 33.930984°N 118.233048°W

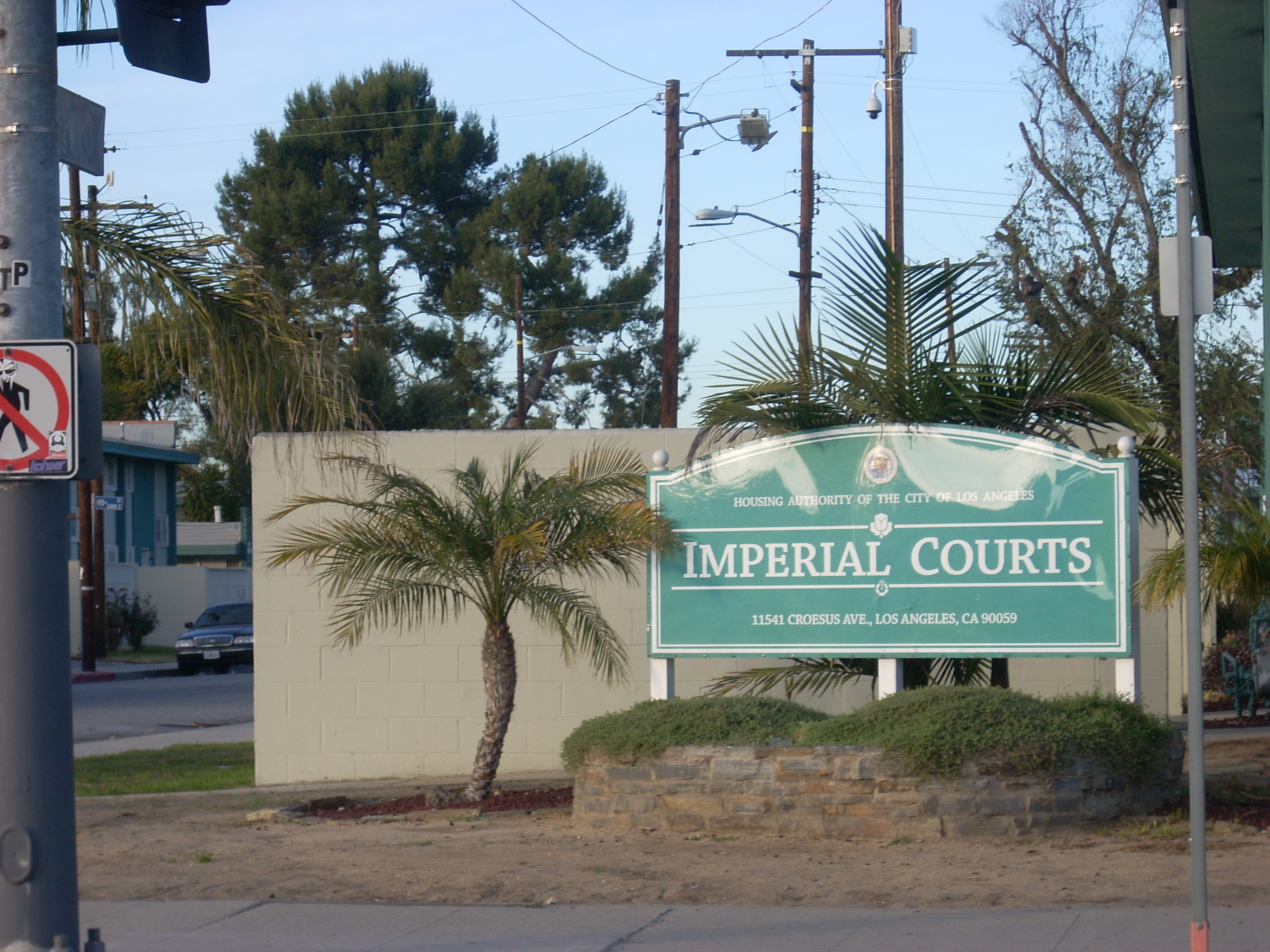
Imperial Courts sign near the 105 on-ramp

Imperial Courts is a public housing project located in Watts, Los Angeles, California.

It is located at 11541 Croesus Avenue on Imperial Highway, between Grape Street and Mona Boulevard, near the 105 Freeway. The federally subsidized project of 498 units was completed in May 1944. It is operated by the Housing Authority of the City of Los Angeles. The project is predominantly inhabited by persons of African-American and Mexican descent, who in 1991 constituted 88 percent of the population. It is one of the largest housing projects west of the Mississippi River.

== Emergency services ==
=== Police service ===
The Los Angeles Police Department operates the nearby Southeast Community Police Station. This location resulted in a general reduction in crime in comparison to the 1990s, although the area still has a homicide rate 57% higher than the Los Angeles County average. On October 26, 2014, five people were shot in the complex, including one woman who was killed, in separate incidents.

== Education ==
Imperial Courts are zoned to:

- Grape Elementary School
- Markham Middle School
- Jordan High School.

All three are in the Los Angeles Unified School District.

== Notable events ==
TEDxWatts was hosted in Watts on March 11, 2017, by organizer Justin Mayo.

The project is the subject of a 22-year documentary project called Imperial Courts by Dutch photographer Dana Lixenburg.

The P Jay Crips were founded at this project.

Parts of the motion picture Training Day were filmed in Imperial Courts to give the movie a true-to-life project setting.

The movie Imperial Dreams starring John Boyega was shot in Imperial Courts.

The video of "Cool Like Me" by Fryars was also shot in Imperial Courts.
