= Justin Mayo =

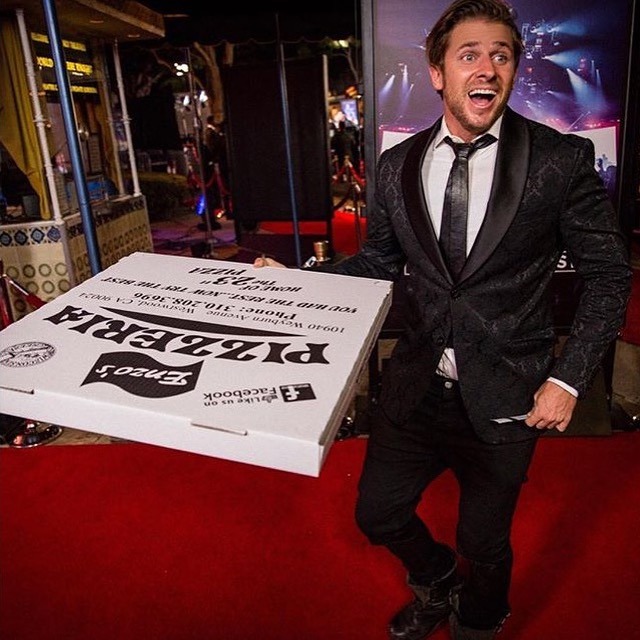
- Mayo entertaining at a Red Carpet premiere, Hollywood, California, 2016.
- Born: December 19, 1981 (age 44); Omaha, Nebraska, U.S.
- Occupations: American humanitarian; youth activist; philanthropist
- Years active: 2006–present
- Parents: Sam Mayo; Jeanne Mayo
- Website: justinmayo.com

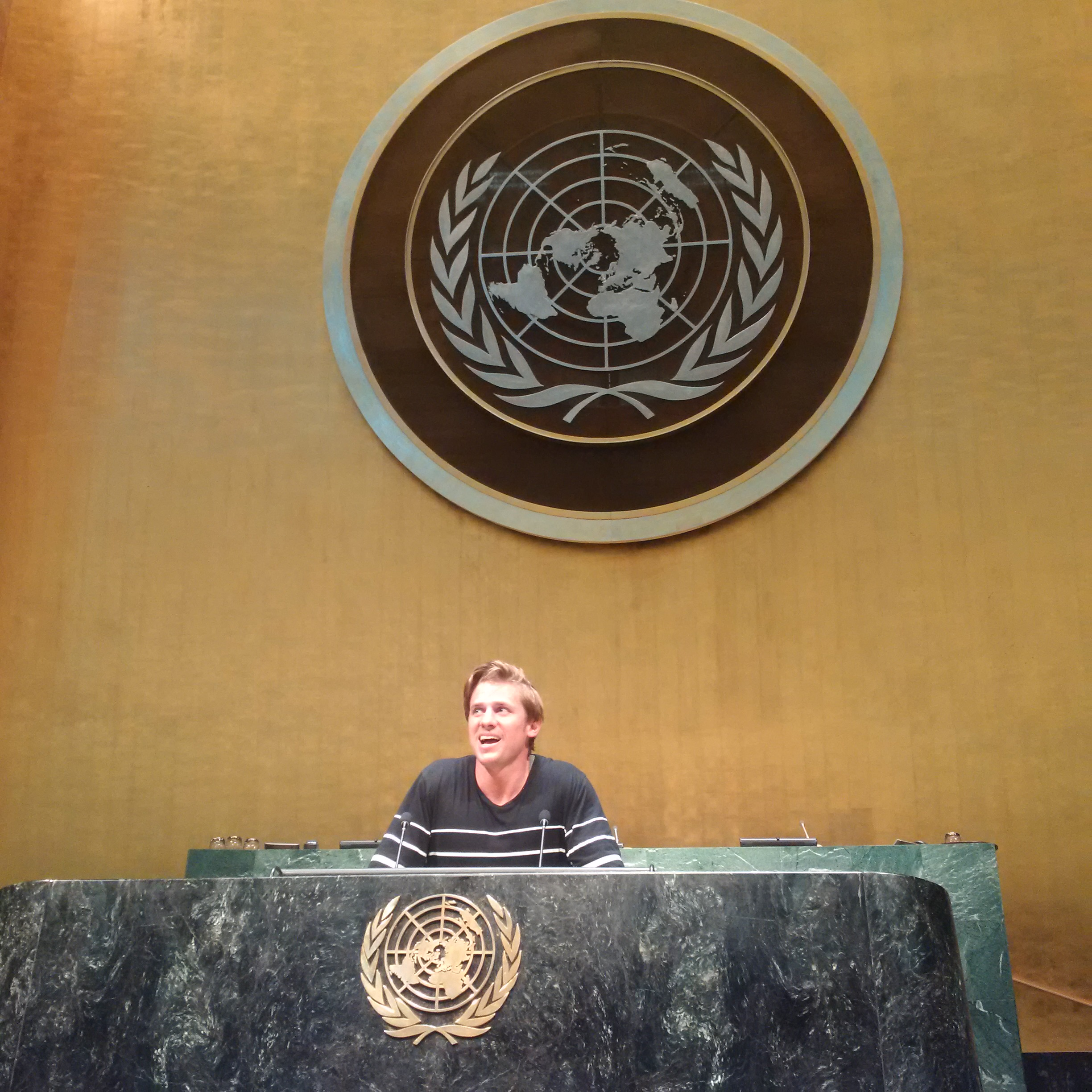
Justin Mayo speaks at the United Nations.

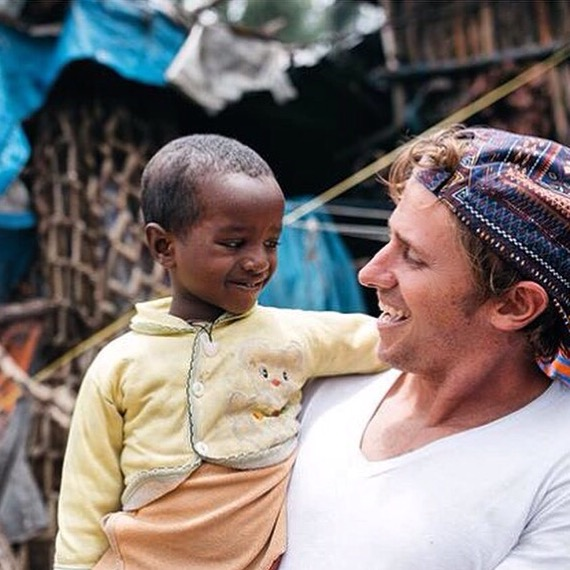
Justin Mayo with a little child in an African Village of Korah, Ethiopia.

Justin Mayo (December 19, 1981) is an American humanitarian, youth activist and philanthropist. He is the executive director of the international charity Red Eye and founder of the Youth Mentor initiative. He is the son of Sam Mayo and international speaker and author Jeanne Mayo.

== Early life and education ==
Mayo was born in Omaha, Nebraska and grew up outside of Chicago, Illinois. Later he moved to Sacramento, California. After completing University, Mayo moved to Sydney, Australia for 15 months.

== Career ==
Mayo is the executive director for the charity Red Eye which has been featured in BET, Complex, Entertainment Tonight, Hollywood Life, Inquisitr, InStyle, People, Perez Hilton, Success magazine, Teen Vogue, TMZ, Us Weekly, Vice, Young Influencers List, and others.

He is in charge of TEDxWatts.

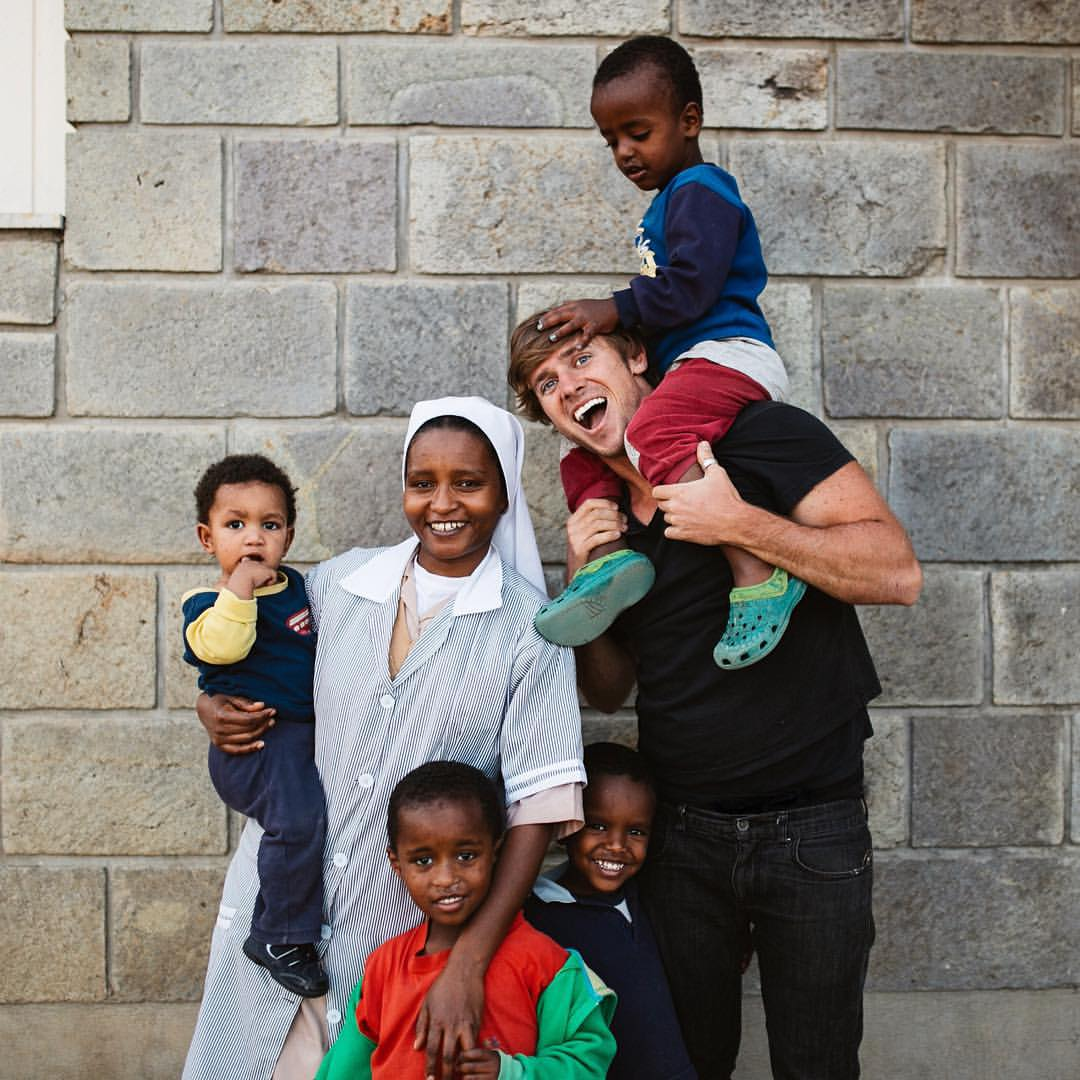
Justin Mayo visits an African Orphanage.

== Personal life ==
Mayo strives to "Treat everyone like the true VIP that they are. It doesn't matter if they are living in a penthouse in NYC or on the streets of Skid Row."

In 2015 Mayo adopted a wolf, Dakota Jean and later rescued a Great Dane, King Duke.

In 2015 Mayo moved to Skid Row which is amongst many that his charity serves. The loft he resides in is between the LA Mission, Downtown Women's Center and Downtown Mental Health Center.
