= Jordan Downs =

Public housing apartment complex in Watts, Los Angeles, California

Coordinates: 33.94535°N 118.23484°W

- Interactive map of Jordan Downs

General information
- Status: Under Renovation

Construction
- Constructed: 1955

Other information
- Governing body: Housing Authority of the City of Los Angeles

Jordan Downs is a 700-unit public housing apartment complex in Watts, Los Angeles, California, next to Jordan High School. It consists of 103 buildings with townhouse style units ranging from one bedroom to five bedrooms. The complex is owned and managed by the Housing Authority of the City of Los Angeles (HACLA).

The complex is bounded by Grape Street to the west, 97th Street to the north, Alameda Street to the east, and 103rd Street to the south. This large area had been used as a truck farm for years and during the second World War it supplied vegetables for the surrounding communities of Watts, South Gate and Lynwood.

== History ==
First opened in May 1944, the complex was originally developed as semi-permanent housing for war workers during World War II. In the early 1950s, HACLA converted it to public housing; it was among the last of the public housing projects in Watts to be opened for that purpose. It opened in 1955, shortly after new mayor Norris Poulson ended all new public housing in the city.

The development, like others in the area, began partially integrated; however, its tenancy rapidly became majority black, approaching 100% by the mid-1960s. This rapid change occurred for a number of reasons. Many of the veterans who still lived in the projects in the early 1950s moved out as they were able to purchase homes. Blacks, still migrating west after the war ended, gravitated toward areas like Watts that already had sizeable black populations. In addition, at least in the first decade of the post-war period, restrictive covenants helped channel recent migrants into Watts and away from nearby suburban cities, such as Compton.

=== 1960s to 1980s ===
Across the next four decades, Jordan Downs and the other project houses came to be seen as microcosms of the ills of society: either of the dependency of individuals on the welfare state, as conservatives argued, or of institutional racism, lack of access to education and jobs, and the cycle of poverty, as liberals argued. The rapid decrease in manufacturing jobs in Los Angeles depressed the area; at the same time, the concentration of impoverished citizens, combined with a pervasive sense of disenfranchisement and official indifference or hostility, made the housing projects likely breeding-grounds for crime. Jordan Downs was one of the flashpoints of the 1965 Watts riots. Like the other housing projects, Jordan Downs benefited relatively little from the influx of federal money and attention that followed the riots. In the seventies and eighties, despair about the post-war model of public housing and declining federal spending in this area served to further dilapidate this and the other area projects.

By the mid-1980s, Jordan Downs was known as one of the homes of the newly prominent street gang, the Crips. In 1989, claiming that HACLA had failed to improve quality of life at the project, executive director Leila Gonzalez-Correa announced plans to sell the project to a private developer at market value. The plan was intended to provide a fresh influx of money while preserving the land as low-income housing. The plan was eventually cancelled in the face of opposition from residents and the Los Angeles City Council; potential buyers also noted that the security and insurance risks associated with the project would be likely to make Jordan Downs an unprofitable investment. The controversy contributed to Gonzalez-Correa's departure from the housing authority at the end of 1989.

=== 1990s and today ===
In the early 1990s, Jordan Downs witnessed the same social changes that marked the city as a whole. The changing demographics of Watts were reflected in tenancy at the project, as Latin American tenants began to make inroads into the long-sizeable black majority at the facility. This transformation, though generally peaceful, was accompanied by occasional tension.

The Grape Street Crips wore purple bandanas in their left pocket. They were key players in both the Watts truce that preceded the 1992 Los Angeles riots and the more general truce agreed to in the wake of the riots. As a result, Jordan Downs was comparatively peaceful for the balance of the 1990s. The resurgence of gang violence in the new century, combined with steep cutbacks in police patrols, has led to a steady increase in gang violence but has decreased rapidly in the late 2000s due to numerous police raids.

== Redevelopment project ==
Jordan Downs is currently [when?] under construction in completely transforming the projects into a modern urban village with new apartment complexes, new restaurants, retail stores and parks.

== Media ==
The complex is featured in the movie Menace II Society.

== Notable residents ==
- Florence Griffith-Joyner — American track and field athlete.
- 03 Greedo — rapper.
- Tyrese Gibson — Actor.
- Isabell Masters — United States Third-party Presidential candidate.

== Emergency services ==
=== Police service ===
Los Angeles Police Department operates the nearby Southeast Community Police Station .

== Education ==
Jordan Downs residents are zoned to the following public/public-charter schools:

- Florence Griffith-Joyner Elementary School (Previously known as 102nd Street Elementary School.)
- Markham Middle School
- KIPP Philosophers Academy
- Jordan High School.

== Trivia ==
Grand Theft Auto: San Andreas featured a re-creation of Jordan Downs housing projects, in Willowfield, Los Santos.
