= Bounty Hunter Watts Bloods =

African-American street gang

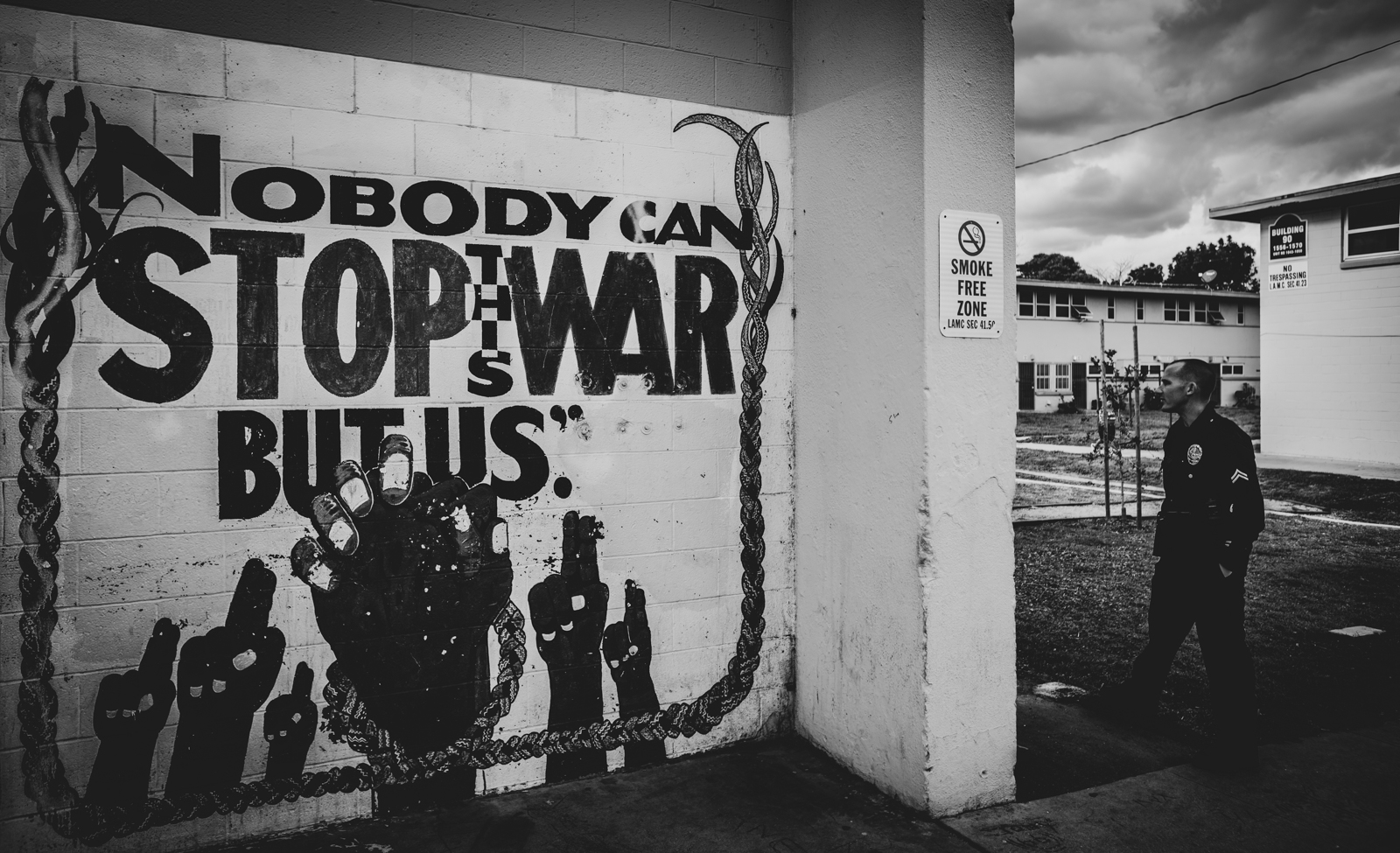
- A mural referring to the war between the Bounty Hunter Watts Bloods and the Grape Street Watts Crips.
- Founding location: Watts, Los Angeles, California, United States
- Years active: 1969–2024
- Territory: Nickerson Gardens
- Ethnicity: Mostly African American
- Membership (est.): 2,000
- Criminal activities: Drug trafficking, robbery, extortion, murder, burglary, identity theft, car theft, kidnapping
- Rivals: Grape Street Watts Crips, West Side Piru, 118 East Coast Crips

The Bounty Hunter Watts Bloods, also known as the Bounty Hunter Bloods, is a "set" of the Bloods gang alliance situated in the Nickerson Gardens public housing projects in Watts, Los Angeles. Though rivals of many Crip sets, they are allied with the PJ Watts Crips of Imperial Courts, a neighboring public housing project down the street. The two sets allied against their rivals, the Grape Street Crips, as well as enemies from other sets.

== History ==
The gang was originally established in 1969 but became well established by 1972. Whilst today it is a set of the Bloods, it was originally known as the Green Jackets. Gary Barker and Bobby Jack are believed to be the set's founders.

The gang is perhaps most known for its longstanding rivalry with the Grape Street Watts Crips which has been described by gang experts as "the most violent and long lasting feud between two gangs that are in the Watts area". In 1992, the Watts truce was declared which saw a rapid decline in violence between the two street gangs. However, by 2005, the truce had reportedly imploded with the homicide rate increasing to at least seven.

In 1993, Regis Deon Thomas, a member of the Bounty Hunter Watts Bloods, shot and killed two Compton Police Department officers during a traffic stop. They were the first Compton police officers to be killed in the line of duty in the department's 65-year history.

In 1997, members of the 118 East Coast Crips shot a school bus in the hopes of killing members of the Bounty Hunter Bloods, killing 17-year-old bystander Corie Williams instead.

In 2003, shots were fired at Los Angeles Police Department patrol officers in two incidents in the Nickerson Gardens projects. In 2000, the FBI convicted 30 Bounty Hunter Watts Bloods members on federal drug violations for the distribution and conspiracy to distribute crack cocaine. An injunction was imposed on the gang in 2004 which limited the movements of members.

In 2013, O.F.T.B. rapper and Bounty Hunter Watts Bloods affiliate, Kevin “Flipside” White, was shot dead by alleged members of the Grape Street Watts Crips.

== Overview ==
The gang is situated within Nickerson Gardens, the largest government housing complex west of the Mississippi River. The complex forms the majority of its territory which is the largest of any African-American street gang in Watts. The gang has over 2,000 documented members and is subdivided into numerous subsets and cliques, including the Lot Boys, Block Boys, Bell Haven, Ace Line, Duece Line, Tray Line, Four Line and Five Line. Like all Bloods gangs, the Bounty Hunter Watts Bloods affiliate themselves with the color red. Its members tattoo themselves with the letters "B" and "H" which refer to "Bounty Hunters" and also use the letters in hand signs.

Its members have been known to attend Centennial High School in Compton.

In addition to its feud with the Grape Street Watts Crips, the gang is also known to feud with West Side Piru, which is based in nearby Compton, and 118 East Coast Crips.

There are other street gangs across the United States which claim the same name, such as the 59 Bounty Hunter Bloods in Houston, Texas and the Bounty Hunter Bloods in Detroit, Michigan.

== Notable members ==
- Jay Rock
- O.F.T.B.
- Regis Deon Thomas
