= Jordan High School (Los Angeles) =

Public high school in California, US

Location
- 2265 East 103rd Street. Los Angeles, California 90002; 33°56′39.04″N 118°13′51.45″W

Information
- Type: Public
- Established: 1923
- Locale: City, Large
- School district: Los Angeles Unified School District
- NCES District ID: 0622710
- NCES School ID: 062271003109
- Principal: Alex Kim
- Teaching staff: 49.52 (on an FTE basis)
- Grades: 9–12
- Enrollment: 797 (2024–25)
  - Male: 429
  - Female: 368
- Student to teacher ratio: 16.09
- Colors: Royal blue White
- Athletics conference: Eastern League; CIF Los Angeles City Section
- Mascot: Bulldogs
- Nickname: Jordan
- Website: jordanhs.lausd.org

Jordan High School is a public comprehensive four-year high school in Los Angeles, California. Until October 2020, the school was named David Starr Jordan High School, after eugenicist David Starr Jordan, the first president of Stanford University (from 1891 to 1913). The school colors are Royal blue and white and the mascot is a bulldog.

Some sections of Florence-Graham, an unincorporated neighborhood in Los Angeles County, are jointly zoned to Jordan and John C. Fremont High School. The Gonzaque Village, Imperial Courts, Jordan Downs, and Nickerson Gardens public housing developments of Los Angeles are zoned to Jordan.

Jordan is one of a few high schools to have three, unrelated, Olympic gold medalists come from the same high school in Hayes Edward Sanders, Florence Griffith-Joyner and Kevin Young. Sanders, in 1952, became the first African American to win the Olympic Heavyweight Boxing Championship while Griffith-Joyner still holds the current World Record in her respective event.

It was in the Los Angeles City High School District until 1961, when it merged into LAUSD.

With public input from the local community, the Los Angeles Unified School District school board unanimously voted in October 2020 to officially shorten the name of the school to "Jordan High School" and remove all references to David Starr Jordan.

== Modernization ==
From early 2015 through late 2016, David Starr Jordan High School was temporarily closed for modernizations and new construction at the school. Students moved to a different school during renovations.

Prior to the 2005 opening of South East High School, Jordan served portions of the city of South Gate.

In March 2017 LAUSD sued the Los Angeles Housing Authority, stating that contaminants seeped onto the Jordan site from the neighboring Jordan Downs housing project.

== Notable alumni ==
- Earl Battey, former professional baseball player (Chicago White Sox, Washington Senators, Minnesota Twins)
- George Brown, long jumper
- Buddy Collette, jazz saxophonist
- Bobby Darwin, former professional baseball player (Los Angeles Angels, Los Angeles Dodgers, Minnesota Twins, Milwaukee Brewers, Boston Red Sox, Chicago Cubs)
- Michael Douglass, All-Pro linebacker for the Green Bay Packers and San Diego Chargers; owner of Alpine Fitness and M.D. Fitness in San Diego. 2003 Packers Hall of Fame inductee.
- Dunia Elvir, television journalist, producer, motivational speaker and autism advocate.
- Joey Fatts, rapper
- Florence Griffith-Joyner, multiple-Olympic gold medalist and current world record holder in the 100 meters and 200 meters
- Art Harris, former professional basketball player
- Aaron Holbert, former professional baseball player (St. Louis Cardinals, Cincinnati Reds) and current manager of the Mississippi Braves
- Ray Holbert, former professional baseball player (San Diego Padres, Montreal Expos, Atlanta Braves, Kansas City Royals)
- Brenda Holloway, Motown recording artist
- Leon Hooten, former professional baseball player (Oakland Athletics)
- Gail Hopkins, former professional baseball player (Chicago White Sox, Kansas City Royals, Los Angeles Dodgers)
- Le-Lo Lang, NFL cornerback
- Charles Mingus, jazz bassist
- Manny Montana, actor
- Roger E. Mosley, actor
- Clarence Otis, Jr., CEO Darden Restaurants (Olive Garden, LongHorn Steakhouse, and Red Lobster)
- Wally Parks, founder of the National Hot Rod Association (NHRA), Class of 1931
- Fletcher Joseph Perry, NFL Hall of Fame running back
- Ron Riley, former professional basketball player
- Hayes Edward Sanders, Olympic heavyweight boxing gold medalist; first African American to win Olympic heavyweight title
- Walter "Scotty" Scott, member of R&B group, The Whispers
- Paul Scranton, professional basketball player
- Franklin Session, professional basketball player
- Glenn T. Seaborg, discoverer of Plutonium and 1951 Nobel Prize–winning chemist
- Sylvester, singer, graduated in 1969
- Ray Vasquez, Singer, Trombonist, and actor
- James Washington, NFL safety (Los Angeles Rams, Dallas Cowboys, Washington Redskins) and two-time Super Bowl champion
- Britt Woodman, jazz trombonist, Class of 1938
- Kevin Young, 1992 Olympic gold medalist, former world record holder in 400 meter hurdles
