= Grape Street Crips =

African-American street gang

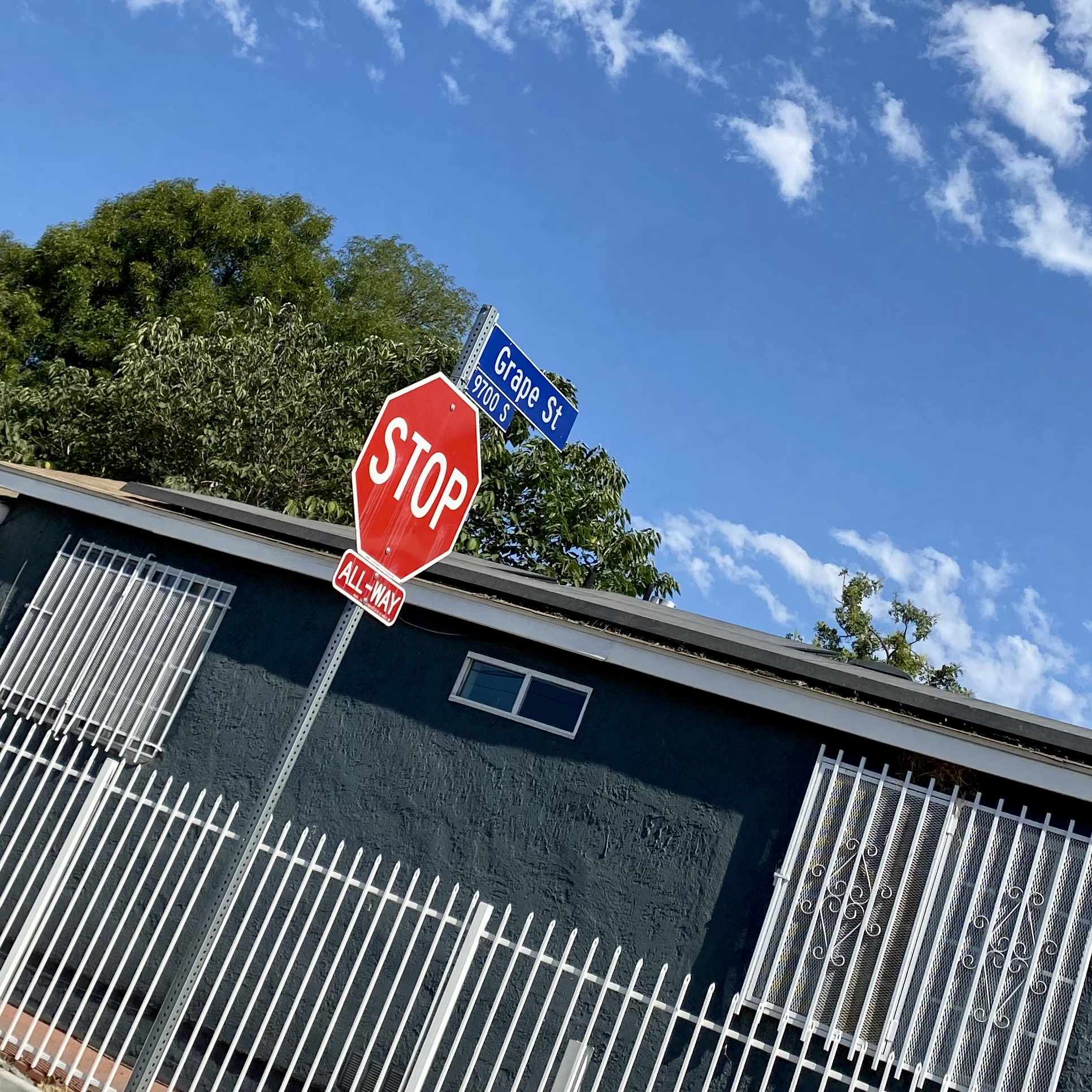
- Grape Street, Los Angeles
- Founding location: Watts, Los Angeles
- Years active: 1970s – present
- Territory: California, Tennessee, New Jersey, Connecticut
- Allies: Eight Trey Gangster Crips
- Rivals: Bounty Hunter Bloods
- Notable members: 03 Greedo

The Grape Street Watts Crips, better known simply as the Grape Street Crips, are a set of Crips based in the Watts neighborhood of Los Angeles. The gang's rivalry with the Bounty Hunter Bloods has been described as being "the most violent and long lasting feud between two gangs that are in the Watts area."

== History ==
Brandon "BL" Bullard, a veteran of the Grape Street Crips, was murdered by the East Coast Crips in 2008. The murder of Bullard sparked a war that resulted in 26 wounded and 9 dead in the six weeks that followed.

== Media appearances ==
Members of the Grape Street Crips appeared in the documentary Crips and Bloods: Made in America, directed by Stacy Peralta.

== See also ==
- Jordan Downs
