= Deaths in May 2017 =

The following is a list of notable deaths in May 2017.

Entries for each day are listed alphabetically by surname. A typical entry lists information in the following sequence:

- Name, age, country of citizenship at birth, subsequent country of citizenship (if applicable), what subject was noted for, cause of death (if known), and reference.

== May 2017 ==
=== 1 ===
- Anatoly Aleksin, 92, Russian writer and poet.
- Richard Basciano, 91, American property developer.
- Katy Bødtger, 84, Danish singer, natural causes.
- Raul Costa Seibeb, 25, Namibian racing cyclist, winner of the National Road Race Championship (2014), traffic collision.
- Freeman Craw, 100, American typeface designer.
- Yisrael Friedman, 93, Israeli rabbi and educator.
- Howard Frank, 75, American network engineer.
- Pierre Gaspard-Huit, 99, French film director and screenwriter.
- Roy Gater, 76, English footballer (Port Vale, Bournemouth & Boscombe Athletic, Crewe Alexandra), Alzheimer's disease.
- Eugene Gendlin, 90, Austrian-born American philosopher.
- Kurt Grönholm, 90, Finnish Olympic rower (1952).
- Bruce Hampton, 70, American musician (Hampton Grease Band, Aquarium Rescue Unit) and actor (Sling Blade).
- Erkki Kurenniemi, 75, Finnish musician.
- Alice Langtry, 84, American politician, member of the Pennsylvania House of Representatives (1985–1992).
- Yuri Lobanov, 64, Tajik sprint canoeist, Olympic champion (1972).
- Mike Lowry, 78, American politician, Governor of Washington (1993–1997) and U.S. Representative from Washington's 7th congressional district (1979–1989), complications from a stroke.
- Sam Mele, 95, American baseball player (Boston Red Sox, Washington Senators) and manager (Minnesota Twins), natural causes.
- Janet Pilgrim, 82, American model (Playboy).
- Karel Schoeman, 77, South African novelist, apparent suicide by dehydration.
- Sterling Seagrave, 80, American investigative journalist and author.
- Eduard Sekler, 96, Austrian architect and architectural historian.
- Betty Shannon, 95, American mathematician.
- Mohamed Talbi, 95, Tunisian historian.
- Stanley Weston, 84, American licensing agent and inventor of the action figure, creator of G.I. Joe and ThunderCats, complications from surgery.
- Bill Wilkie, 95, Scottish musician and businessman.

=== 2 ===
- John Bahen, 73, Australian footballer (Fitzroy).
- Vincent Baggetta, 72, American actor (The Eddie Capra Mysteries).
- Harold Bedoya Pizarro, 78, Colombian military officer and politician, commander of the National Army (1994–1996), lymphoma.
- Tiny Benson, 95, American racing driver.
- Michael Bore, 69, English cricketer (Yorkshire, Nottinghamshire).
- Abelardo Castillo, 82, Argentine writer.
- Cammy Duncan, 51, Scottish footballer (Motherwell, Partick Thistle, Ayr United), cancer.
- Michael Gurr, 55, Australian playwright (Departure).
- Hugo Judd, 77, Canadian-born New Zealand diplomat.
- Dale Kennington, 82, American painter.
- Heinz Kessler, 97, German politician and military officer, East German Minister of National Defence (1985–1989).
- Toby Kimball, 74, American basketball player (Boston Celtics, San Diego Rockets, New Orleans Jazz), inflammatory lung disease.
- Diane Lewis, 65, American architect, author and academic.
- Paul MacEwan, 74, Canadian politician.
- Gerry Martiniuk, 79, Canadian politician, MPP of Ontario from Cambridge (1995–2011), cancer.
- Anne Morrissy Merick, 83, American war correspondent and journalist, complications from dementia.
- George Hugh Niederauer, 80, American Roman Catholic prelate, Archbishop of San Francisco (2006–2012), lung cancer.
- A. R. Penck, 77, German artist, complications from a stroke.
- Eduardo Portella, 84, Brazilian essayist, author and politician, Minister of Education (1979–1980).
- Norma Procter, 89, English opera singer.
- T. Gary Rogers, 74, American entrepreneur (Dreyer's).
- Willi Roth, 87, German Olympic boxer.
- Leo K. Thorsness, 85, American air force officer and Medal of Honor recipient, member of the Washington Senate (1988–1992), leukemia.
- Romeo Vasquez, 78, Filipino actor, stroke.
- Moray Watson, 88, British actor (The Darling Buds of May, The Quatermass Experiment, Compact).
- Barry Wood, 74, South African Roman Catholic prelate, Auxiliary Bishop of Durban (since 2005).
- Grigori Zhislin, 71, Russian violinist.

=== 3 ===
- Mishaal bin Abdulaziz Al Saud, 90, Saudi prince, Governor of Mecca (1963–1971), Minister of Defense (1951–1953).
- Lukas Ammann, 104, Swiss actor (Graf Yoster, Die Fallers – Eine Schwarzwaldfamilie, Meschugge), complications from surgery.
- John Bjørnebye, 76, Norwegian diplomat, ambassador to Japan (1994–1999) and Belgium (2001–2006).
- Alma W. Byrd, 92, American politician, member of the South Carolina House of Representatives (1991–1998).
- Godfrey Chidyausiku, 70, Zimbabwean judge and politician, complications from cancer.
- Georgie Collins, 91, Canadian actress (Ghostkeeper) and stage director.
- Attila Császár, 58, Hungarian sprint canoer, world championship bronze medalist (1983).
- John Foruria, 72, American football player (Pittsburgh Steelers).
- Paul Hanneman, 80, American politician, member of the Oregon House of Representatives (1965–1990).
- Charles Hoffer, 87, American music educator and author.
- Casey Jones, 77, American blues drummer, cancer.
- Daliah Lavi, 74, Israeli actress (Casino Royale, The Spy with a Cold Nose, Catlow), singer and model.
- Greg MacLeod, 81, Canadian priest and educator.
- Hugh Marjoribanks, 83, Aussie cricketer.
- Pat Marsh, 83, British ice hockey administrator.
- Giampaolo Medda, 89, Italian Olympic hockey player.
- Tsedendambyn Natsagdorj, 73, Mongolian Olympic wrestler.
- Papillon, 26, Irish racehorse, winner of the 2000 Grand National.
- Eva Pfarrhofer, 88, Austrian Olympic diver.
- Doug Rollerson, 63, New Zealand rugby player (Manawatu, national team), cancer.
- Bengt Rosén, 81, Swedish politician, MP (1985–1994).
- Abbas Abdullahi Sheikh Siraji, 32, Somali politician, shot.
- Irene Smart, 96, American politician and judge.
- Yumeji Tsukioka, 94, Japanese actress (The Temptress and the Monk), pneumonia.

=== 4 ===
- Keith Aggett, 85, Australian rugby footballer.
- Joseph Barnes, 102, Irish physician.
- William Baumol, 95, American economist.
- Roland Blackmon, 88, American Olympic hurdler.
- Robert C. Broshar, 85, American architect.
- Bart Carlier, 87, Dutch footballer (Fortuna Sittard).
- Jay Carty, 75, American basketball player (Los Angeles Lakers) and evangelist, cancer.
- Milena Čelesnik, 83, Slovenian Olympic athlete.
- Richard Dalby, 68, British ghost story editor, scholar and bookseller, diabetic ketoacidosis.
- William A. Davis Jr., 89, American engineer.
- Fukui Fumimasa, 82, Japanese Buddhist monk and scholar.
- François Gagnon, 95, Canadian politician.
- C. Jackson Grayson, 93, American businessman and writer.
- Glenna Sue Kidd, 83, American baseball player (South Bend Blue Sox).
- Victor Lanoux, 80, French actor (Cousin Cousine), complications from a stroke.
- D.G.H. Latzko, 93, Dutch mechanical engineer.
- Stephen McKenna, 78, British artist.
- Timo Mäkinen, 79, Finnish racing driver (World Rally Championship).
- Michael Maskell, 65, English footballer (Brentford).
- Satsorupavathy Nathan, 80, Sri Lankan radio personality.
- Ruwen Ogien, 67, French philosopher.
- Richard Pennington, 69, American police officer, Superintendent of the New Orleans Police Department (1994–2002).
- Rosie Scott, 69, New Zealand author, brain tumour.
- Edwin Sherin, 87, American theatre director (The Great White Hope) and television producer (Law & Order).
- Bob Summerhays, 90, American football player (Green Bay Packers).
- Beryl Te Wiata, 92, New Zealand actress (My Letter to George, Xena: Warrior Princess).

=== 5 ===
- Clive Brooks, 67, British drummer (Egg, The Groundhogs, Pink Floyd).
- Buhe, 91, Chinese politician, Chairman of Inner Mongolia (1982–1993).
- Binyamin Elon, 62, Israeli politician and rabbi, Minister of Tourism (2001–2002; 2003–2004) and member of Knesset (1996–2009), complications from throat cancer.
- Corinne Erhel, 50, French politician, member of the National Assembly (since 2007), heart attack.
- Amancio Escapa Aparicio, 79, Spanish-born Dominican Republic Roman Catholic prelate, Auxiliary Bishop of Santo Domingo (1996–2016).
- Almir Guineto, 70, Brazilian sambista, kidney disease and diabetes.
- Adolph Kiefer, 98, American swimmer, Olympic champion (1936).
- Bernard Mitton, 62, South African tennis player.
- Tommy Neck, 78, American football player (Chicago Bears).
- Quinn O'Hara, 76, Scottish-born American actress (The Ghost in the Invisible Bikini).
- Leila Seth, 86, Indian judge, Chief Justice of the Himachal Pradesh High Court (1991–1992), cardio-respiratory arrest.
- Rekha Sindhu, 22, Indian actress, traffic collision.
- Ely Ould Mohamed Vall, 64, Mauritanian politician, President (2005–2007), heart attack.
- Michael Wearing, 78, British television producer (Edge of Darkness).
- Michael Zwack, 67, American painter and sculptor, lung cancer.

=== 6 ===
- Youssef Anis Abi-Aad, 77, Syrian Maronite hierarch, Archbishop of Aleppo (1997–2013).
- Richard Battey, 87, American federal judge, U.S. District Court for the District of South Dakota (1985–1999).
- John Bennison, 92, Australian businessman (Wesfarmers).
- Tony Conwell, 85, English footballer (Derby County, Huddersfield Town, Doncaster Rovers).
- Jesús Galdeano, 85, Spanish racing cyclist.
- Tommy Henaughan, 86, American-born Scottish footballer (Kilmarnock, Brentford, Greenock Morton).
- Steven Holcomb, 37, American bobsledder, Olympic champion (2010), pulmonary edema.
- Val Jellay, 89, Australian actress (The Flying Doctors, Prisoner, Homicide), pneumonia.
- Rais Khan, 77, Pakistani sitarist.
- Peter Kivy, 82, American musicologist, cancer.
- Grzegorz Kosma, 60, Polish Olympic handball player (1980).
- Mihir Kumar Nandi, 71, Bangladeshi Rabindra Sangeet singer, cancer.
- Peter Noble, 72, English footballer (Swindon Town, Burnley).
- Peng Shaoyi, 99, Chinese physical chemist.
- William Polewarczyk, 69, American politician.
- Manuel Rodriguez Sr., 105, Filipino printmaker.
- John Schultz, 84, American writer.
- Khalil Mohamed Shahin, 75, Egyptian Olympic footballer.
- Marshall Julum Shakya, 76, Nepalese politician, complications from pneumonia, heart failure and septic shock.
- Min Bahadur Sherchan, 85, Nepalese mountaineer, suspected heart attack.
- Vasily Tarasyuk, 68, Russian politician, drowned.
- Henry Tempest, 93, English landowner (Broughton Hall), kidney failure.
- Jack Tilton, 66, American art dealer, cancer.
- Yves Velan, 91, French-born Swiss writer.

=== 7 ===
- Yoshimitsu Banno, 86, Japanese director, cameraman and writer (Godzilla vs. Hedorah, Throne of Blood, The Bad Sleep Well), subarachnoid hemorrhage.
- Auguste Batina, 81, Congolese politician.
- Eivind Eckbo, 89, Norwegian politician, leader of Anders Lange's Party (1974–1975).
- Louise Emanuel, 63, South African-born British child psychotherapist.
- Peter T. Flawn, 91, American geologist and educator, President of University of Texas at Austin (1979–1985, 1997–1998).
- Gran Apache, 58, Mexican professional wrestler (AAA), intestinal cancer.
- Mahendra Gupte, 86, Indian cricket umpire.
- Eduard Gutiérrez, 21, Colombian footballer (Atlético Huila), traffic collision.
- Elon Lages Lima, 87, Brazilian mathematician.
- Beppo Mauhart, 83, Austrian executive.
- Bob Mimm, 92, American Olympic racewalker (1960), prostate cancer.
- Rod Monroe, 40, American football player (Cleveland Browns, Atlanta Falcons), heart attack.
- Chuck Orsborn, 99, American college basketball coach and athletic administrator (Bradley Braves).
- Gholamreza Pahlavi, 93, Iranian prince.
- Dave Pell, 92, American jazz saxophonist.
- John Stroppa, 91, Canadian football player (Winnipeg Blue Bombers).
- Richard Summers, 95, British RAF air observer during the Battle of Britain.
- Hugh Thomas, Baron Thomas of Swynnerton, 85, British historian and life peer.
- Hubertus Antonius van der Aa, 81, Dutch mycologist.
- Svend Wam, 71, Norwegian director (Lasse & Geir).
- Lee Weissenborn, 88, American politician.
- Thomas A. White, 85, Irish Roman Catholic prelate, Apostolic Nuncio (1978–1996).
- Wu Wenjun, 97, Chinese mathematician and academician.

=== 8 ===
- Faqir Aizazuddin, 81, Pakistani cricketer.
- Cécile DeWitt-Morette, 94, French mathematician and physicist.
- Dennis H. Farber, 71, American painter and photographer, complications from lung cancer and diabetes.
- Maurie Fowler, 72, Australian rules footballer (Carlton), complications from motor neuron disease.
- Art Gob, 79, American football player (Washington Redskins, Los Angeles Chargers).
- George Irvine, 69, American basketball player (Virginia Squires) and coach (Indiana Pacers, Detroit Pistons), cancer.
- Stefania Jabłońska, 96, Polish cancer researcher.
- Curt Lowens, 91, German-born American actor (Werewolf in a Girls' Dormitory, The Hindenburg, Angels & Demons) and Holocaust survivor, fall.
- Allan H. Meltzer, 89, American economist.
- J. David Molson, 88, Canadian business executive (Molson Brewery), president of the Montreal Canadiens (1964–1972).
- Lou Richards, 94, Australian footballer (Collingwood).
- Ulugbek Ruzimov, 48, Uzbekistani footballer (Pakhtakor Tashkent), cirrhosis.
- Lawson Soulsby, Baron Soulsby of Swaffham Prior, 90, British microbiologist and life peer, Member of the House of Lords (1990–2015).
- Nicolas Stacey, 89, English Olympic clergyman (1952).
- Judith Stein, 77, American historian, lung cancer.
- James S. Sutterlin, 95, American diplomat.
- Juan Carlos Tedesco, 73, Argentine politician, Minister of Education (2007–2009).
- Mary Tsoni, 29, Greek actress (Dogtooth) and singer, pulmonary edema.
- Peter Vogel, 80, German artist.
- Clarence Williams, 70, American football player (Green Bay Packers).

=== 9 ===
- Hussein Ali Abdulle, 71, Somali football player and manager (national team).
- Ron Atkey, 75, Canadian lawyer and politician, MP and Minister of Employment and Immigration (1979–1980).
- Armando Baptista-Bastos, 83, Portuguese author and journalist.
- Brian James Barnes, 84, Australian-born Papuan Roman Catholic prelate, Bishop of Aitape (1987–1997) and Archbishop of Port Moresby (1997–2008).
- Christopher Boykin, 45, American entertainer and musician (Rob & Big), heart failure.
- John Collins, 86, Welsh rugby union player (national team).
- Sal Cuevas, 62, American bassist.
- Hermann End, 75, German Olympic field hockey player.
- John Kivela, 47, American businessman and politician, member of the Michigan House of Representatives (since 2013), suicide by hanging.
- Guerrando Lenzi, 77, Italian cyclist.
- Zoran Madžirov, 49, Macedonian percussionist, traffic collision.
- Jean Mailland, 80, French film director and author.
- Robert Miles, 47, Swiss-born Italian electronic dance musician and record producer ("Children"), cancer.
- Arthur Moulin, 92, French politician, member of the National Assembly (1958–1973) and Senate (1983–1992).
- Michael Parks, 77, American actor (Twin Peaks, From Dusk till Dawn, Kill Bill).
- Qian Qichen, 89, Chinese diplomat, Foreign Minister (1988–1998) and Vice Premier (1993–2003).
- Wilburn K. Ross, 94, American WWII veteran, Medal of Honor recipient.
- John Valder, 85, Australian journalist and politician, kidney disease.
- Edward Lunn Young, 96, American politician, member of the U.S. House of Representatives from South Carolina's 6th congressional district (1973–1975).

=== 10 ===
- Fozia Anjum, 77, Pakistani radio broadcaster and poet.
- Silvano Basagni, 78, Italian sport shooter, Olympic bronze medalist (1972).
- Geoffrey Bayldon, 93, English actor (Catweazle, Worzel Gummidge, Casino Royale).
- Emmanuèle Bernheim, 61, French author and screenwriter (Swimming Pool, 5x2).
- Joy Byers, 82, American songwriter ("Please Don't Stop Loving Me").
- Eloise E. Clark, 85–86, American biologist, President of the American Association for the Advancement of Science (1994).
- Bill Ebery, 91, Australian politician, member of the Victorian Legislative Assembly (1973–1983).
- Greg Forristall, 67, American politician, member of the Iowa House of Representatives (since 2007), cancer.
- Colette Guillaumin, 83, French feminist.
- Safet Halilović, 66, Bosnian politician, President of the Federation of Bosnia and Herzegovina (2002–2003).
- Ted Hibberd, 91, Canadian ice hockey player, Olympic gold medalist (1948).
- Douglas Netter, 95, American television producer (Babylon 5).
- Charles S. Peterson, 90, American historian.
- Rex Sanders, 94, British Royal Air Force officer.
- Judy Seigel, 86, American painter and photographer.
- Gordon Simpson, 87, Australian politician, member of the Queensland Legislative Assembly (1974–1989).
- Gaisi Takeuti, 91, Japanese mathematician.
- Nelson Xavier, 75, Brazilian actor (The Guns, A Queda), lung disease.

=== 11 ===
- Alexander Bodunov, 65, Russian ice hockey player (Soviet national team), world champion (1973).
- William David Brohn, 84, American music arranger and orchestrator (Ragtime, Oliver!, Wicked), Tony winner (1998).
- Seaborn Buckalew Jr., 96, American jurist and politician, delegate to the Alaska constitutional convention, member of the Alaska House (1955–1959) and Senate (1960–1961).
- Gabriel Chiramel, 102, Indian Roman Catholic priest, educationist, zoologist and author.
- Mark Colvin, 65, British-born Australian journalist and radio presenter (PM), lung cancer.
- Clelio Darida, 90, Italian politician, Mayor of Rome (1969–1976) and Minister of Justice (1981–1983).
- John F. Donahue, 92, American businessman (Federated Investors).
- İbrahim Erkal, 50, Turkish singer-songwriter, cerebral hemorrhage.
- Nigel Forman, 74, British politician, MP for Carshalton and Wallington (1976–1997).
- Roland Gräf, 82, German cinematographer, film director and screenwriter (The House on the River, Fallada: The Last Chapter, The Tango Player).
- Helga Haller von Hallerstein, 90, German countess and politician, MEP (1993–1994).
- Elisabet Hermodsson, 89, Swedish artist and poet.
- Caroline Hussey, 75, Irish microbiologist.
- Yale Lary, 86, American football player (Detroit Lions), businessman and politician, member of the Texas House of Representatives (1959–1963).
- Charles A. McClenahan, 76, American politician, member of the Maryland House of Delegates (1992–2003).
- Simpson Mutambanengwe, 87, Zimbabwean-Namibian judge, renal failure.
- Roger Sale, 84, American literary critic.
- Gerald D. Suttles, 84-85, American urban sociologist.
- David Thomas, 74, Welsh Anglican prelate, Provincial Assistant Bishop of the Church in Wales.
- Donnie Thomas, 64, American football player (New England Patriots, Hamilton Tiger-Cats).

=== 12 ===
- Louis Boyer, 95, French politician, member of the Senate for Loiret (1974–2001) and mayor of Gien (1959–1995).
- Antonio Candido, 98, Brazilian literary critic and sociologist.
- Alain Colmerauer, 76, French computer scientist.
- Bill Dowdy, 84, American jazz drummer (The Three Sounds).
- Brendan Duddy, 80, Northern Irish property developer, political activist, and peace negotiator.
- Michael Jackson, 48, American football player (Cleveland Browns, Baltimore Ravens) and politician, mayor of Tangipahoa, Louisiana (2009–2012), traffic collision.
- Sally Jacobsen, 70, American journalist, first female international editor of the Associated Press, cancer.
- Mauno Koivisto, 93, Finnish politician, President (1982–1994) and Prime Minister (1968–1970, 1979–1982), complications from Alzheimer's disease.
- Henri Termeer, 71, Dutch-born American biotechnology executive (Genzyme).
- George A. Thompson, 97, American geologist.
- Yu So-chow, 86, Chinese actress, pneumonia.
- Oleksandr Zadorozhnii, 57, Ukrainian lawyer, politician and scientist, member of Verkhovna Rada (1998–2006).
- Amotz Zahavi, 89, Israeli evolutionary biologist.

=== 13 ===
- Oliviero Beha, 68, Italian journalist.
- Ron Bontemps, 90, American basketball player, Olympic gold medalist (1952).
- Jimmy Copley, 63, English drummer (Jeff Beck, Graham Parker, Tears for Fears), leukaemia.
- John Cygan, 63, American actor and comedian (The Commish, Metal Gear, Toy Story 3), cancer.
- Yanko Daucik, 76, Czech footballer (Real Betis, Real Madrid).
- Janet Lewis-Jones, 67, British executive (BBC Trust).
- Nancy Oestreich Lurie, 93, American anthropologist.
- Vera Martelli, 86, Italian Olympic sprinter (1952).
- Rachid Natouri, 71, Algerian footballer (Metz, Troyes, national team).
- Jane Norman, 83, American actress (Pixanne).
- Thomas H. Paterniti, 88, American politician, New Jersey assemblyman (1980–1988) and senator (1988–1992).
- Marcel Pelletier, 89, Canadian ice hockey player (Chicago Blackhawks, New York Rangers) and scout (Boston Bruins).
- Manuel Pradal, 53, French film director and screenwriter (A Crime, Ginostra, Marie from the Bay of Angels).
- Len Rohde, 79, American football player (San Francisco 49ers).
- Earl Sinks, 77, American singer and actor (The Girl from Tobacco Row).
- Eberhard Spiecker, 85, German clergyman.
- Nicholas Tarling, 86, British-born New Zealand historian, academic (University of Auckland) and author.

=== 14 ===
- Dilbagh Singh Athwal, 89, Indian geneticist and agriculturist.
- Edmund Bagwell, 50, British cartoonist (Judge Dredd, Nick Fury), pancreatic cancer.
- Powers Boothe, 68, American actor (Tombstone, Deadwood, Red Dawn), Emmy winner (1980), heart attack due to pancreatic cancer.
- Frank Brian, 94, American basketball player (Fort Wayne Pistons).
- Scott Christianson, 69, American author and journalist.
- Bill Cox, 88, American football player (Washington Redskins).
- Thomas Vose Daily, 89, American Roman Catholic prelate, Bishop of Brooklyn (1990–2003).
- Abdullah Nimar Darwish, 69, Israeli political activist and religious leader, founder of Islamic Movement in Israel.
- Chuck Davis, 80, American dancer and choreographer (DanceAfrica).
- Alain Defossé, 60, French novelist and translator.
- Rennie Dumas, Trinidad and Tobago politician, hospital complications.
- Jean Fritz, 101, American children's writer.
- Brad Grey, 59, American producer (The Departed, Charlie and the Chocolate Factory, The Sopranos), chairman and CEO of Paramount Pictures (2005–2017), cancer.
- Bruce Hill, 67, American racing driver, esophageal cancer.
- Tom McClung, 60, American jazz pianist and composer, cancer.
- Keith Mitchell, 65, American drummer (Mazzy Star, Opal), cancer.
- Steve Palermo, 67, American baseball umpire and supervisor, lung cancer.
- Silvan S. Schweber, 89, French-born American physicist and science historian.
- Peter W. Smith, 81, American investment banker and political operative.
- Joyce Sullivan, 87, Canadian mezzo-soprano.
- Elske ter Veld, 72, Dutch politician.

=== 15 ===
- Karl-Otto Apel, 95, German philosopher.
- Herbert R. Axelrod, 89, American ichthyologist and musical instrument collector.
- Graeme Barrow, 80, Australian author.
- Chu Ke-liang, 70, Taiwanese actor (The New Legend of Shaolin, David Loman, The Wonderful Wedding) and comedian, liver failure.
- Felipe Ehrenberg, 73, Mexican artist, professor and publisher.
- Karlene Faith, 79, Canadian criminologist, aortic aneurysm.
- François Fortassin, 77, French politician, senator (since 2001).
- Nasser Givehchi, 85, Iranian wrestler, Olympic silver medalist (1952).
- Koryne Kaneski Horbal, 80, American feminist and political activist, heart failure.
- Stan Kaluznick, 85, Canadian football player (Calgary Stampeders).
- Thomas James Kinsman, 72, American soldier, Medal of Honor recipient.
- Takeshi Kusaka, 86, Japanese actor.
- Bob Kuzava, 93, American baseball player (New York Yankees, Chicago White Sox, Washington Senators).
- Al Lawrence, 86, Australian long-distance runner, Olympic bronze medalist (1956).
- Ulrich Libbrecht, 88, Belgian philosopher.
- Guy Monraisse, 85, French racing driver.
- S. Ramassamy, 77, Indian politician, Chief Minister of Puducherry (1974, 1977–1978).
- Neil Rolde, 85, American historian and politician, member of the Maine House of Representatives (1974–1990).
- David Saul, 77, Bermudian politician, Premier of Bermuda (1995–1997).
- Javier Valdez Cárdenas, 50, Mexican reporter (Ríodoce, La Jornada), shot.
- Oleg Vidov, 73, Russian-American actor (Red Heat, Wild Orchid, Thirteen Days), complications from cancer.

=== 16 ===
- Roy Ackerman, 75, English restaurateur (The Gay Hussar).
- Bernard Bosson, 69, French politician, Minister of Transport, Tourism and Public Works (1993–1995).
- Mack Burton, 78, American football player (BC Lions).
- Alain Casabona, 66, French author.
- Ronnie Cocks, 73, Maltese footballer (Sliema Wanderers, national team).
- Julian A. Cook, 86, American federal judge, U.S. District Court for the Eastern District of Michigan (1978–1996).
- Eleanor Kieliszek, 91, American politician, Mayor of Teaneck, New Jersey (1974–1978, 1990–1992).
- Anne Kimbell, 84, American actress (Monster from the Ocean Floor).
- Walter Kollmann, 84, Austrian footballer (Wacker Wien).
- Oleksiy Kruhliak, 41, Ukrainian Olympic fencer.
- Megan Lowe, 101, English cricketer (national team).
- Gunnar Möller, 88, German actor (I Often Think of Piroschka).
- Albert A. Mullin, 83, American engineer and mathematician.
- Outi Ojala, 70, Finnish politician, MEP (1996–1999), member of the Parliament of Finland (1991–1996, 1999–2007), President of the Nordic Council (2001–2002).
- Glenn L. Pace, 77, American religious leader, general authority of the LDS Church (since 1985).
- Doug Somers, 65, American professional wrestler (AWA).
- Rosa Speer, 94, American gospel singer (Speer Family).
- Emilio Lorenzo Stehle, 90, German-born Ecuadorian Roman Catholic prelate, Bishop of Santo Domingo de los Colorados (1987–2002).
- James Zavitz, 94, Canadian Olympic sports shooter.

=== 17 ===
- Aristeidis Alafouzos, 93, Greek shipping and media mogul.
- Roxcy Bolton, 90, American civil rights activist and feminist, founder of Women in Distress.
- Faruq Ahmed Choudhury, 84, Bangladeshi diplomat, Foreign Secretary (1984–1986), High Commissioner to India (1986–1992).
- Raúl Córdoba, 93, Mexican footballer (Club Atlas, national team).
- Liebe Sokol Diamond, 86, American pediatric orthopedic surgeon, lymphoma.
- Eustace Gibbs, 3rd Baron Wraxall, 87, British diplomat and aristocrat.
- Viktor Gorbatko, 82, Russian cosmonaut (Soyuz 7, 24 and 37).
- Firuz Kazemzadeh, 92, Russian-born American historian.
- Dick Maier, 91, American politician.
- Rhodri Morgan, 77, British politician, MP for Cardiff West (1987–2001), Leader of Welsh Labour (2000–2009) and First Minister (2000–2009).
- Tor Morisse, 69, Norwegian children's author and cartoonist.
- Moji Olaiya, 42, Nigerian actress (Apaadi), cardiac arrest.
- David A Ramey, 78, American artist.
- Gerhard Schreiber, 76, German military historian.
- Alan Swinbank, 72, British racehorse trainer.
- Unusual Heat, 27, American racehorse, euthanized.
- Todor Veselinović, 86, Serbian football player and manager (FK Vojvodina, Fenerbahçe, Yugoslavia national team), Olympic silver medalist (1956).

=== 18 ===
- Roger Ailes, 77, American television executive, Chairman and CEO of Fox News (1996–2016), subdural hematoma.
- Michael Bliss, 76, Canadian historian and biographer (Frederick Banting, William Osler, Harvey Cushing).
- Vadim Chernobrov, 51, Russian paranormal investigator.
- Chris Cornell, 52, American musician and songwriter (Soundgarden, Audioslave, Temple of the Dog), suicide by hanging.
- Dai Zijin, 101, Chinese WWII aviator (Flying Tigers).
- Anil Madhav Dave, 60, Indian politician, MP (since 2009), Minister of Environment, Forest and Climate Change (since 2016), cardiac arrest.
- Volodymyr Dudarenko, 71, Ukrainian football player (CSKA Moscow) and manager (SKA Lviv).
- Dame Di Ellis, 79, British rower.
- Anna Epps, 86, American microbiologist.
- Jacque Fresco, 101, American futurist.
- Thord Karlsson, 75, Swedish Olympic ski jumper.
- Reema Lagoo, 58, Indian actress (Hum Aapke Hain Koun..!, Maine Pyar Kiya, Kal Ho Naa Ho), heart attack.
- José Mercado, 88, Mexican Olympic footballer (1948).
- Jim McElreath, 89, American race car driver.
- Tatsuya Nōmi, 47, Japanese actor (Gosei Sentai Dairanger).
- Olev Olesk, 96, Estonian politician, Minister of Foreign Affairs in exile (1990–1992).
- Frankie Paul, 51, Jamaican singer, kidney failure.
- Daniele Piombi, 83, Italian television and radio presenter.
- Erwin Potts, 85, American businessman (McClatchy).
- Tor Fredrik Rasmussen, 91, Norwegian geographer.
- Eric Stevenson, 74, Scottish footballer (Hibernian), cancer.
- John Thompson, 88, British journalist and radio director (Independent Broadcasting Authority).

=== 19 ===
- Alex. E.K. Ashiabor, 86, Ghanaian economist, Governor of the Bank of Ghana (1977–1983).
- Donald Avenson, 72, American politician, member of the Iowa House of Representatives (1979–1989).
- André Bach, 73, French general and historian.
- Chana Bloch, 77, American poet, cancer.
- Peter Bonsall-Boone, 78, Australian LGBT rights activist, cancer.
- Rich Buckler, 68, American comic book artist (Deathlok, All-Star Squadron, Fantastic Four), cancer.
- Judy Burton, 69, American educationalist.
- David Bystroň, 34, Czech footballer (Baník Ostrava), suicide by hanging.
- John Cavell, 100, British Anglican prelate, Bishop of Southampton (1972–1984).
- Ben Cherski, 87, Canadian ice hockey player.
- Grady C. Cothen, 96, American religious leader and academic administrator, President of Oklahoma Baptist University (1966–1970).
- Corbett Cresswell, 84, English footballer (Carlisle United F.C.).
- Hubertus Ernst, 100, Dutch Roman Catholic prelate, Bishop of Breda (1967–1992).
- Jan Fontein, 89, Dutch art historian.
- Stanley Greene, 68, American photojournalist, cancer.
- Roger Haudegand, 85, French Olympic basketball player (1952, 1956).
- Rita Kerr, 91, American author.
- Kid Vinil, 62, Brazilian singer and record producer.
- Dave McDonald, 73, American baseball player (New York Yankees, Montreal Expos).
- Herbert L. Meschke, 89, American politician and judge, Justice on the North Dakota Supreme Court (1985–1998), member of the North Dakota House of Representatives (1965–1966) and Senate (1967–1970).
- Ed Mierkowicz, 93, American baseball player (Detroit Tigers).
- Nawshirwan Mustafa, 72, Iraqi Kurdish politician, general coordinator of the Movement for Change, lung cancer.
- Stanislav Petrov, 77, Russian Lieutenant colonel in the Soviet Air Defense Forces, hypostatic pneumonia.
- Tommy Ross, 71, Scottish footballer (York City).
- David Sánchez, 25, Mexican flyweight boxer, traffic collision.
- Reidar Torp, 94, Norwegian military officer.
- Mário Viegas Carrascalão, 80, East Timorese politician, Governor of East Timor during the Indonesian occupation (1982–1992).
- Wayne Walker, 80, American football player (Detroit Lions), sports broadcaster and director (KPIX, NFL on CBS), complications from Parkinson's disease.
- Steve Waterbury, 65, American baseball player (St. Louis Cardinals).

=== 20 ===
- Recep Adanır, 88, Turkish footballer (Beşiktaş J.K.).
- Albert Bouvet, 87, French racing cyclist.
- Joy Corning, 84, American politician, Lieutenant Governor of Iowa (1991–1999), liver illness.
- Jimmy Dale, 81, British-born Canadian musician.
- Emile Degelin, 90, Belgian film director (If the Wind Frightens You, Life and Death in Flanders).
- Paul Falk, 95, German figure skater, Olympic Champion (1952).
- Bryan Farr, 93, English cricketer.
- Victor Găureanu, 49, Romanian Olympic fencer (1992, 2000), world championship bronze medalist (1994, 2001).
- Claude Hipps, 90, American football player (Pittsburgh Steelers).
- Syed Abdullah Khalid, 75, Bangladeshi sculptor, complications from COPD.
- Abdul Rahim Khan Mandokhel, 84, Pakistani politician.
- Noel Kinsey, 91, Welsh footballer (Birmingham City).
- Jayne Millington, 55, British RAF officer.
- Miguel Mykycej, 82, Ukrainian-born Argentine Ukrainian Catholic hierarch, Bishop of Santa María del Patrocinio in Buenos Aires (1999–2010).
- William Clifford Newman, 88, American Roman Catholic prelate, Auxiliary Bishop of Baltimore (1984–2003).
- Michael Rank, 67, English journalist and translator.
- Jean E. Sammet, 89, American computer scientist.
- Natalia Shakhovskaya, 81, Russian cellist.
- Lisa Spoonauer, 44, American actress (Clerks), accidental hydromorphone overdose.
- Roger Tassé, 85, Canadian civil servant, architect of the Canadian Charter of Rights and Freedoms.
- Alexander Alexandrovich Volkov, 65, Russian politician, President of the Udmurt Republic (2000–2014).
- James Weatherhead, 86, Scottish minister, Moderator of the General Assembly of the Church of Scotland (1993–1994).

=== 21 ===
- Al Ater, 63, American politician.
- Kenny Cordray, 62, American guitarist and songwriter, shot.
- Andrew Dallmeyer, 72, Scottish playwright and actor (Eliza Graves).
- Sir Paul Judge, 68, British businessman (Cadbury Schweppes, Premier Brands, Standard Bank) and political executive.
- Shulamit Kishik-Cohen, 100, Argentine-born Israeli spy.
- Jimmy LaFave, 61, American folk singer, songwriter and guitarist, cancer.
- Sir Peter Marychurch, 89, British intelligence officer, Director of GCHQ (1983–1989).
- Tulsa Pittaway, 42, South African musician (Watershed), traffic collision.
- Philippa Roles, 39, Welsh Olympic discus thrower (2004, 2008).
- Wayne Simoneau, 82, American politician.
- Lars-Erik Skiöld, 65, Swedish wrestler, Olympic bronze medalist (1980).
- Bill White, 77, Canadian ice hockey player (Chicago Blackhawks, Los Angeles Kings, national team).
- Larry Wright, 77, American cartoonist (The Detroit News).

=== 22 ===
- Graham Ayliffe, 91, English medical microbiologist.
- Barry Azzopardi, 70, British chemical engineer, cancer.
- William Carney, 74, American politician, member of the U.S. House of Representatives from New York's 1st congressional district (1979–1987), prostate cancer.
- Chan Yuk-shee, 72–73, Hong Kong economist and academic administrator, President of Lingnan University (2007–2013).
- Barbara Smith Conrad, 79, American opera singer.
- Manuel de Seabra, 85, Portuguese writer.
- Devil His Due, 28, American racehorse, euthanized.
- Oscar Fulloné, 78, Argentine football player and coach.
- John Gerard-Pearse, 93, British rear admiral.
- Gérard Girouard, 84, Canadian politician, lawyer and professor of law.
- Nicky Hayden, 35, American motorcycle racer, world champion (2006), injuries from traffic collision.
- Forrest M. Holly Jr., 71, American civil engineer.
- Denys Johnson-Davies, 94, English translator.
- Viktor Kupreichik, 67, Belarusian chess grandmaster.
- Helen Kwalwasser, 89, American violin soloist and teacher.
- Giovanni Lombardi, 90, Swiss civil engineer.
- Dina Merrill, 93, American actress (Operation Petticoat, BUtterfield 8, Desk Set), heiress and socialite, dementia.
- Leonhard Nagenrauft, 79, German Olympic luger (1968, 1972), European champion (1967).
- Vladimir Pereturin, 78, Russian football player and TV commentator.
- Mickey Roker, 84, American jazz drummer, lung cancer.
- William Sesler, 89, American politician.
- Al Weisbecker, 86, American football player and coach.
- Zbigniew Wodecki, 67, Polish singer, composer and musician.

=== 23 ===
- Olivier de Berranger, 78, French Roman Catholic prelate, Bishop of Saint-Denis (1996–2009).
- Roger Boesche, 69, American political theorist.
- Reese Bowman, 8 months, American infant, asphyxia.
- Charles Kofi Bucknor, 64, Ghanaian actor (Run Baby Run).
- Alexander Burdonsky, 75, Russian theatre director, cancer.
- Chandraswami, 66, Indian religious advisor, stroke.
- Constantin Enache, 88, Romanian Olympic cross-country skier.
- Stefano Farina, 54, Italian football referee (UEFA Champions League).
- Ben Finney, 83, American anthropologist.
- Ernst Gebendinger, 91, Swiss gymnast, Olympic silver medalist (1952).
- Denise Guénard, 83, French Olympic athlete (1952, 1960, 1964).
- Cortez Kennedy, 48, American Hall of Fame football player (Seattle Seahawks).
- Peter Lawler, 65, American political scientist.
- Sir Roger Moore, 89, English actor (The Spy Who Loved Me, Maverick, The Saint), cancer.
- Viorel Morariu, 85, Romanian rugby union player, Vernon Pugh Award for Distinguished Service recipient.
- Jerry Perenchio, 86, American businessman (Univision) and producer (Blade Runner), lung cancer.
- Sonny Randle, 81, American football player (St. Louis Cardinals, San Francisco 49ers).
- Patricia Roy, 78, American baseball player (Fort Wayne Daisies).
- Robert Thalmann, 68, Swiss bicycle racer, heart attack.
- Patrick van Rensburg, 85, South African educationalist and anti-apartheid activist.
- Neville Wigram, 2nd Baron Wigram, 101, British Army officer.
- Kaoru Yosano, 78, Japanese politician, Chief Cabinet Secretary (2007).

=== 24 ===
- Ezekiel Anisi, 28, Papua New Guinean politician, MP for Ambunti-Dreikikir (2012, since 2013).
- Giovanni Bignami, 73, Italian astrophysicist, heart attack.
- Ann Birstein, 89, American writer.
- David Bobin, 71, British sports broadcaster (Sky Sports).
- George Chesworth, 86, British Royal Air Force officer and Lord Lieutenant of Moray (1994–2005).
- Tom Gilbey, 79, British fashion designer, cancer.
- Claudia Hellmann, 93, German opera singer.
- William Duborgh Jensen, 82, Norwegian fashion designer.
- Denis Johnson, 67, American author (Jesus' Son, Tree of Smoke, Angels), liver cancer.
- Bata Kameni, 75, Serbian actor and stunt performer.
- Paul Keetch, 56, British politician, MP for Hereford (1997–2010).
- Juliana Young Koo, 111, Chinese-born American diplomat.
- Tchaiko Kwayana, 79, American educator.
- Jared Martin, 75, American actor (Dallas, War of the Worlds, Aenigma), pancreatic cancer.
- Grace McCarthy, 89, Canadian politician, MLA for Vancouver-Little Mountain (1975–1991), brain tumor.
- Fidel Odreman, 80, Venezuelan Olympic boxer.
- Gil Portes, 71, Filipino film director (Saranggola, Small Voices, 'Merika).
- Pilar Ramírez, 53, Mexican Olympic swimmer.
- Isabelle Rapin, 89, Swiss-born American neurologist, pneumonia.
- Ross Rhoads, 84, American pastor (Charlotte Calvary Church, Southern Evangelical Seminary).
- Pierre Seron, 75, Belgian comic book artist.
- Sonny West, 78, American actor and stuntman (Stay Away, Joe, The Hellcats, Bigfoot), lung cancer.

=== 25 ===
- Mohammed Bawa, 67, Nigerian military officer and politician, administrator of Ekiti State (1996–1998) and Gombe State (1998–1999), complications from surgery.
- Jean-Paul Chifflet, 67, French banker, Director General of Crédit Agricole (2010–2015), fall from tractor.
- Marie Cosindas, 93, American photographer.
- Gina Fratini, 85, British fashion designer.
- Alexandros Goulandris, 90, Greek shipowner.
- Siri Gunasinghe, 92, Sri Lankan author and filmmaker.
- Robert E. Haebel, 89, American Marines major general.
- Earl Hagaman, 91, American-born New Zealand hotel magnate.
- Sir Alistair Horne, 91, British historian, journalist and spy.
- Eliezer Jaffe, 83, American-born Israeli sociologist.
- Eva Estrada Kalaw, 96, Filipino politician, senator (1965–1972) and assemblywoman from Manila (1984–1986).
- Frédérick Leboyer, 98, French obstetrician and author.
- Miguel Méndez, 74, American legal scholar.
- Sister Joel Read, 91, American nun and academic administrator, president of Alverno College (1968–2003).
- Saucy Sylvia, 96, Canadian-born American comedian and singer.
- Ali Tanrıyar, 103, Turkish politician, Minister of the Interior (1983–1984) and sports executive, President of Galatasary S.K. (1986–1990).
- Emili Vicente, 52, Spanish football player and coach (CF Reus Deportiu, FC Andorra), traffic collision.
- Daniel Waley, 96, British historian.

=== 26 ===
- Toni Bertorelli, 69, Italian actor (The Young Pope, The Passion of the Christ, Zora the Vampire).
- Sabzar Bhat, Indian militant commander (Hizbul Mujahideen), shot.
- Laura Biagiotti, 73, Italian fashion designer, heart attack.
- Zbigniew Brzezinski, 89, Polish-born American diplomat and political scientist, National Security Advisor (1977–1981).
- Jim Bunning, 85, American Hall of Fame baseball player (Detroit Tigers, Philadelphia Phillies) and politician, member of the U.S. House of Representatives (1987–1999) and U.S. senator (1999–2011), complications from a stroke.
- Robert Curtis, 27, American basketball player (Saint John Mill Rats), shot.
- Kanwar Pal Singh Gill, 82, Indian police officer, Director general of police for Punjab (1988–1990, 1991–1995).
- Clytie Jessop, 87, Australian artist, actress and film director (Emma's War).
- Takie Lebra, 87, Japanese-born American anthropologist.
- Manuel Mora y Araujo, 79, Argentine sociologist and political analyst.
- Derek Neilson, 58, Scottish footballer (Brechin City, Berwick Rangers).
- Robert J. Parins, 98, American judge and sports executive, President of the Green Bay Packers (1982–1989).
- N. Periasamy, 78, Indian politician.
- Philip Szanto, 81, American pathologist.
- Zhao Liping, 65, Chinese politician, police chief and convicted murderer, executed.

=== 27 ===
- Gregg Allman, 69, American Hall of Fame singer-songwriter ("Whipping Post", "Midnight Rider") and musician (The Allman Brothers Band), liver cancer.
- Kiran Ashar, 69, Indian cricketer.
- Thomas Bridges, 2nd Baron Bridges, 89, British diplomat, Ambassador to Italy (1983–1987).
- Fishel Hershkowitz, 94, Ukrainian-born American Hasidic rabbi.
- Hyun Hong-choo, 76, South Korean diplomat, Ambassador to the United States (1991–1993).
- Robert McCarley, 79, American psychiatrist and dream researcher.
- Ludwig Preis, 45, German football coach (SpVgg Greuther Fürth).
- Don Robinson, 84, English rugby league player (Wakefield Trinity, Leeds), world champion (1954).

=== 28 ===
- Anthony Foster, 64, Australian activist for child sexual abuse victims of the Roman Catholic Church.
- Ken Ackerman, 95, American radio announcer (KCBS).
- Chris Brand, 74, British psychologist, hospital-acquired infection.
- Eric Broadley, 88, British race car builder and founder of Lola Cars.
- Elisabeth Chojnacka, 77, Polish harpsichordist (Xenakis Ensemble).
- Frank Deford, 78, American sportswriter (Sports Illustrated), novelist and radio broadcaster (Morning Edition).
- Maury Dexter, 89, American director and producer.
- Ervin E. Dupper, 94, American politician, Member of the South Dakota Senate (1965–1968).
- Marcus Intalex, 45, British disc jockey and record producer.
- Lawrence Jenkins, 93, American World War II veteran and memoirist.
- David E. Kuhl, 87, American scientist.
- Werner Malitz, 90, German Olympic cyclist.
- Hugh McCabe, 62, Northern Irish Gaelic football manager and player.
- Hugh McGraw, 86, American musician.
- Benjamin Melendez, 65, American gang leader (Ghetto Brothers), complications from kidney disease.
- Pat Mullins, 79, American politician, traffic collision.
- Naison Ndlovu, 86, Zimbabwean politician, mayor of Bulawayo (1981–1985) and Deputy Senate President (2008–2013), prostate cancer.
- John Noakes, 83, British television presenter (Blue Peter, Go With Noakes), Alzheimer's disease.
- Adele Y. Schonbrun, 76, American artist, complications from Alzheimer's disease.
- A. Vinayagamoorthy, 83, Sri Lankan politician, MP (2000–2004, 2010–2015).
- Graham Webb, 73, British racing cyclist, road world champion (1967).
- Yu Mingtao, 99, Chinese politician.

=== 29 ===
- Michael A'Hearn, 76, American astronomer.
- Enitan Bababunmi, 76, Nigerian academic, Vice-Chancellor of Lagos State University (1993–1996).
- Tapan Banerjee, 73, Indian cricketer (Bengal).
- Ramon Campos Jr., 92, Filipino Olympic basketball player (1948, 1952, 1956).
- Abbott Lowell Cummings, 94, American architectural historian.
- Dave D'Addio, 55, American football player (Detroit Lions).
- Bogdan Dochev, 80, Bulgarian football player and referee.
- Barbara Jaruzelska, 86, Polish academic, First Lady (1985–1990).
- David Lewiston, 88, British music collector, stroke.
- Konstantinos Mitsotakis, 98, Greek politician, Prime Minister (1990–1993).
- Robin Murray, 76, British economist.
- Manuel Noriega, 83, Panamanian dictator and military official, military ruler (1983–1989), complications from brain surgery.
- Tony Rudd, 93, British stockbroker.
- William J. L. Sladen, 96, Welsh naturalist.
- Nikolay Tatarinov, 89, Russian modern pentathlete, Olympic silver medalist (1960).
- Mordechai Tzipori, 92, Israeli general and politician, Minister of Communications (1981–1984).
- Ananda Wedisinghe, 47, Sri Lankan motor cycle champion.

=== 30 ===
- Denis Brian, 93, Welsh journalist and writer.
- Neil Brockbank, 66, British record producer.
- Sir Gordon Brunton, 95, British businessman.
- Wendell Burton, 69, American actor (The Sterile Cuckoo, You're a Good Man, Charlie Brown, Heat), brain cancer.
- Dibyo Previan Caesario, 24, Indonesian footballer (Persita Tangerang).
- Ken Cooper, 80, American football player and coach (Georgia Bulldogs, Ole Miss Rebels).
- Tom Graham, 67, American football player (Denver Broncos, San Diego Chargers), brain cancer.
- Robert Hammond, 67, Ghanaian footballer (Hearts of Oak, national team).
- Reinhold Hanning, 95, German Waffen-SS concentration camp guard and convicted war criminal.
- George W. Johnson, 88, American academic, president of George Mason University (1978–1996), complications from a fall.
- Daniel Kucera, 94, American Roman Catholic prelate, Archbishop of Dubuque (1983–1995).
- José Carlos Melo, 86, Brazilian Roman Catholic prelate, Archbishop of Maceió (2002–2006).
- Robert Michael Morris, 77, American actor (The Comeback, Running Wilde, How I Met Your Mother) and playwright.
- Dominique Nohain, 91, French actor and theatre director.
- Molly Peters, 75, British actress (Thunderball).
- Dasari Narayana Rao, 75, Indian film director (Meghasandesam) and politician.
- Valère Somé, 66, Burkinabé politician, scholar and revolutionary leader.
- John Taylor, 75, British politician, MP for Solihull (1983–2005).
- Bernt Torberntsson, 88, Swedish Olympic rower (1948, 1952).
- Elena Verdugo, 92, American actress (Marcus Welby, M.D., House of Frankenstein, Panama Sal).

=== 31 ===
- Jean-Marie Benoît Balla, 58, Cameroonian Roman Catholic prelate, Bishop of Bafia (since 2003).
- Clifford Barker, 91, British Anglican prelate, Bishop of Selby (1983–1991).
- Jiří Bělohlávek, 71, Czech conductor, cancer.
- Hans-Hermann Evers, 86, German Olympic equestrian.
- Mimi Heinrich, 80, Danish actress and writer.
- Lubomyr Husar, 84, Ukrainian Ukrainian Catholic hierarch, Major Archbishop of Kyiv-Halych (2001–2011).
- Tino Insana, 69, American actor (Three Amigos, Who's Harry Crumb?, Barnyard), cancer.
- Lyn James, 87, Welsh-born Australian actress (The Young Doctors).
- Mohamed Fadhel Khalil, Tunisian politician.
- Fred J. Koenekamp, 94, American cinematographer (The Towering Inferno, Patton, The Amityville Horror), Oscar winner (1975).
- Fred Kummerow, 102, American biochemist.
- Susan B. Landau, 65, American film producer (Cool Runnings, An Ideal Husband) and talent manager (Simon Beaufoy).
- Jerry Martinson, 74, American-born Taiwanese Jesuit priest, heart attack.
- John May, 67, American politician.
- Bern Nix, 69, American jazz guitarist.
- Parvathamma Rajkumar, 77, Indian film producer.
- Margaret Ray, 83, Australian politician, member of the Victorian Legislative Assembly for Box Hill (1982–1992).
- Louis Riecke, 90, American Olympic weightlifter.
- Kathy Smith, 67–68, Australian politician, member of the New South Wales Legislative Assembly for Gosford (2015–2017), cancer.
- Sonoko Sugimoto, 91, Japanese novelist.
- István Szondy, 91, Hungarian modern pentathlete and horse rider, Olympic champion (1952).
- Diane Torr, 68, Canadian drag king, brain tumour.
