= Judith Stein =

Judith Stein may refer to:

- Judith E. Stein (born 1943), American art historian, curator, and artist
- Judith Stein (historian) (1940–2017), professor of history
