= Shaoyi =

Shaoyi can refer to:

- Gao Shaoyi (Chinese: 高紹義), Northern Qi dynasty prince
- Tang Shaoyi (Chinese: 唐紹儀), first premier of the Republic of China
- Peng Shaoyi (Chinese: 彭少逸), Chinese physical chemist
- Wang Shaoyi (Chinese: 王紹懿), Tang dynasty general
