= Florida State Capitol =

State capitol building of the U.S. state of Florida

Coordinates: 30.43811°N 84.28160°W

- U.S. National Register of Historic Places
- U.S. National Historic Landmark
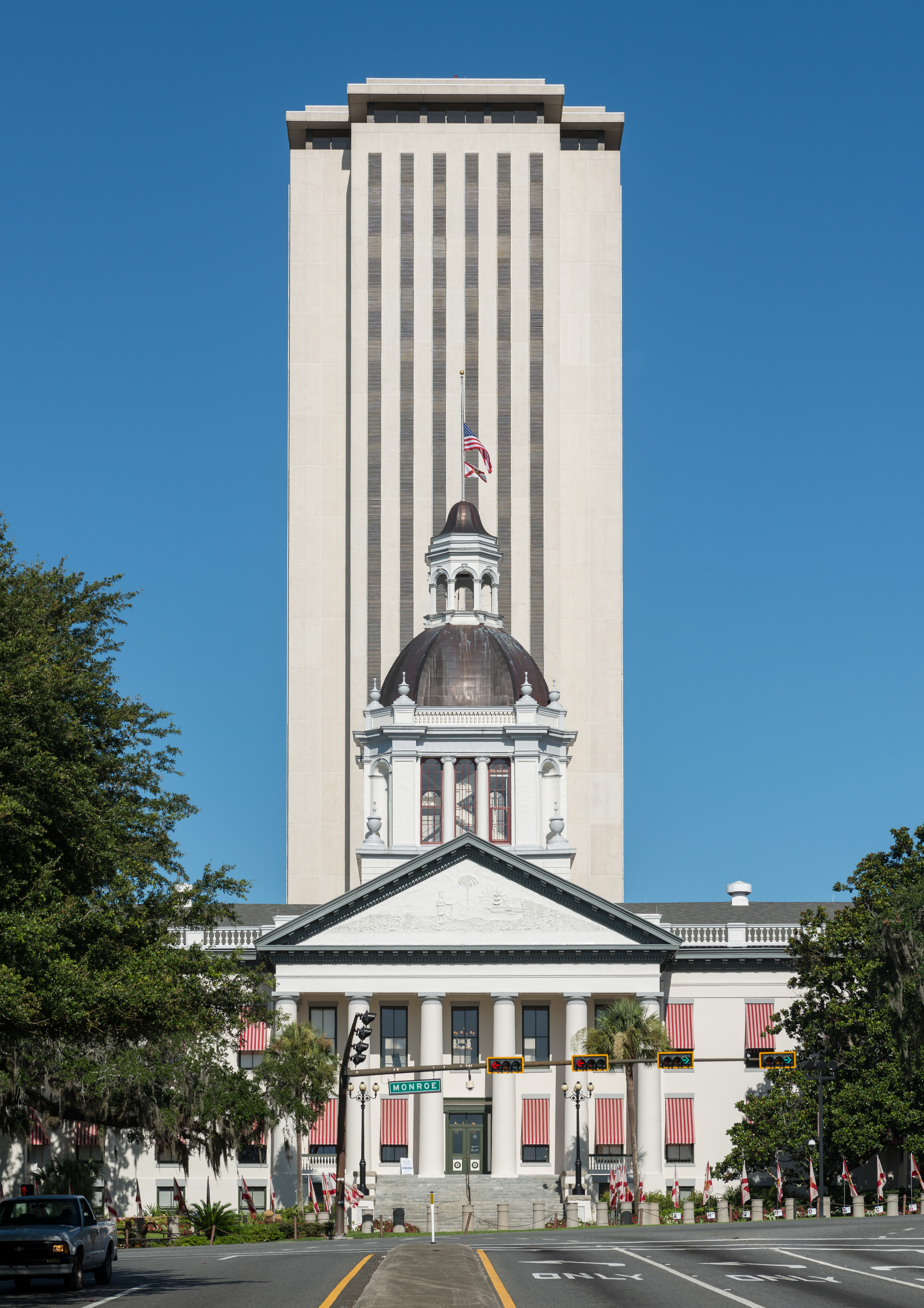
- Florida Capitol buildings (Old Capitol in foreground)
- Interactive map of Florida State Capitol
- Location: 400 S Monroe St, Tallahassee, Florida
- Area: 160000
- Built: 1845; 181 years ago
- Architectural style: Classical Revival
- NRHP reference No.: 73000584
- Added to NRHP: 1973

The Florida State Capitol in Tallahassee, Florida, is an architecturally and historically significant building listed on the National Register of Historic Places. The Capitol is at the intersection of Apalachee Parkway and South Monroe Street in downtown Tallahassee, Florida.

The Historic Capitol, sometimes called "The Old Capitol", built in 1845, was threatened with demolition in the late 1970s when the new capitol building was built. Having been restored to its 1902-version in 1982, the Historic Capitol is directly behind the new Capitol building. Its restored space includes the Governor's Suite, Supreme Court, House of Representatives and Senate chambers, rotunda, and halls. Its adapted space contains a museum exhibiting the state's political history, the Florida Historic Capitol Museum, which is managed by the Florida Legislature. On April 18, 2012, the AIA's Florida Chapter placed the Historic Capitol Building (Restoration) on its list of Florida Architecture: 100 Years. 100 Places.

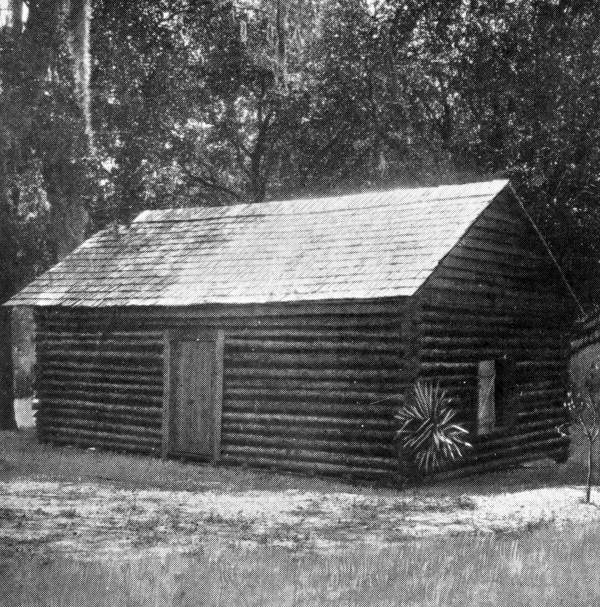
A replica of the first Florida state capitol cabin. Constructed in 1924.

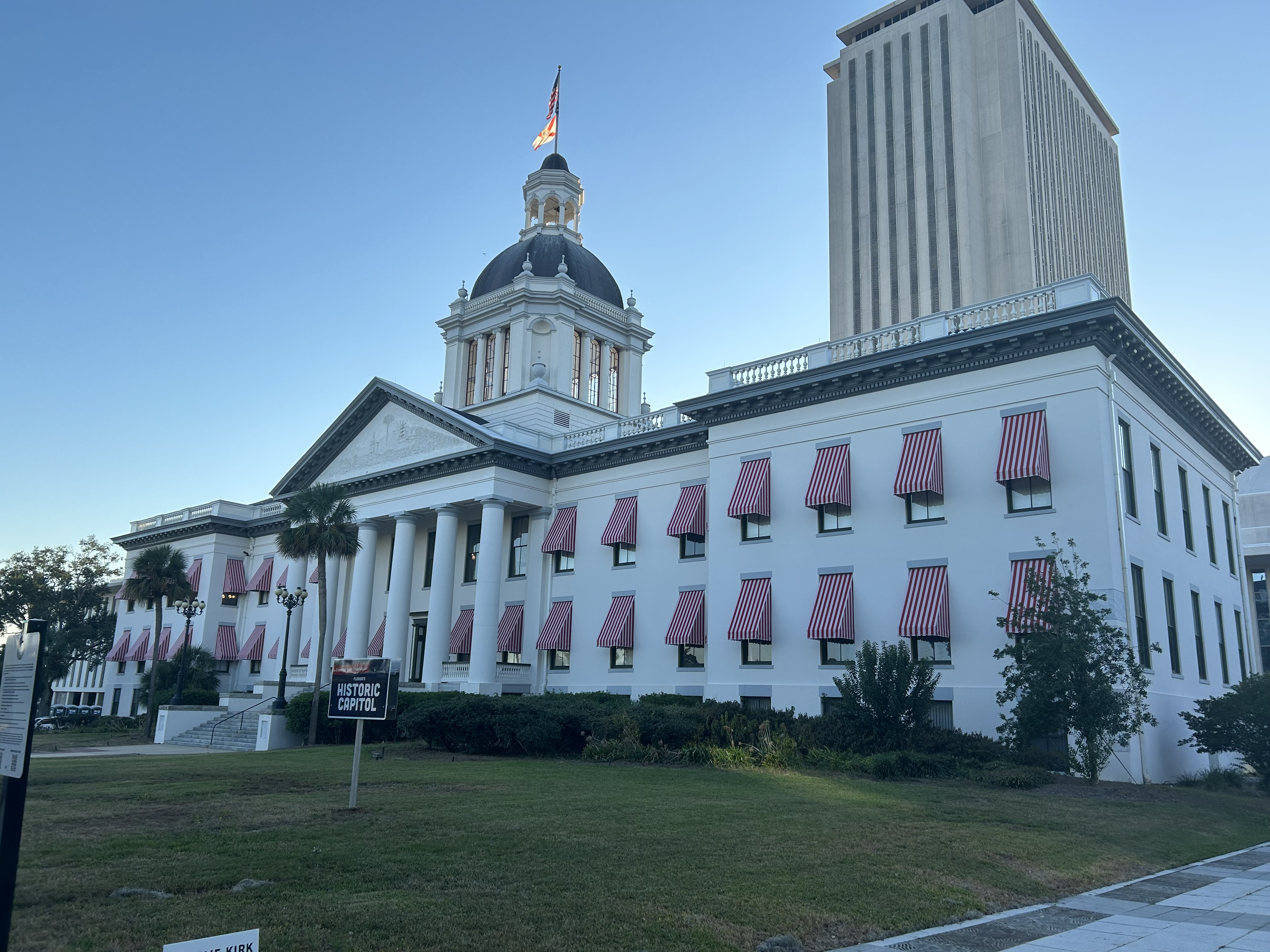
The Old Historic Florida Capitol Building, with the new Capitol Building visible in the background.

The New Tower houses executive and legislative offices and the chambers of the Florida Legislature (consisting of the Florida Senate and Florida House of Representatives).

The Florida Department of Management Services maintains the Capitol Complex, which is open to the public Monday through Friday, 8 a.m. to 5 p.m. (excluding state holidays).

== Names ==
The buildings are informally known as the Old Capitol and the New Capitol; the former is sometimes called the Historic Capitol, or also, the Florida State Capitol. The latter was its official name prior to the construction of the New Capitol in 1977, and was so called by the National Park Service even after the New Capitol was operating. Its legal name today, however, is the Florida Historic Capitol Museum. The New Capitol, as a whole, does not have a legal name. When it was planned, the Capitol Complex (which is a legal name) was going to consist of the House and Senate chambers, and the twenty-two-story office building.

== Background ==
Florida became a United States territory in 1821 in accordance with the Adams–Onís Treaty of 1819. The first two sessions of the Legislative Council of the Territory of Florida convened in Pensacola and St. Augustine respectively, which required almost two months of travel for delegates to attend. The council agreed to meet halfway between the two cities for future meetings, selecting the near-abandoned Apalachee settlement of Anhaica, later renamed Tallahassee, to serve as the place for future meetings. The council convened for the first time in this new location in 1824 in a log cabin in the area now known as Cascades Park until a more permanent capitol building could be constructed.

== The Old Capitol ==
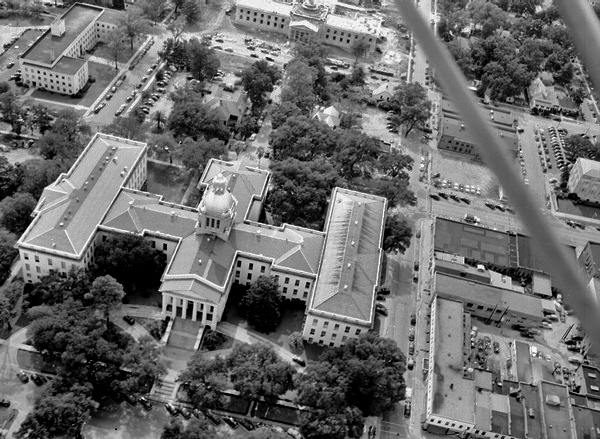
Ariel view of the Florida State Capitol as it appeared in 1948 following the addition of the new House and Senate chamber wings.

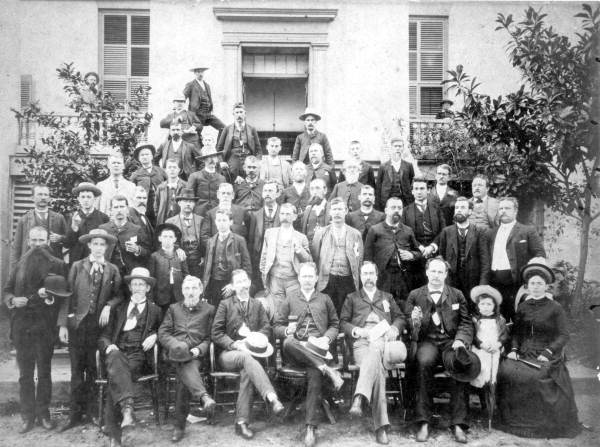
Members of the Florida Senate gathered on the capitol steps for a group portrait c. 1889

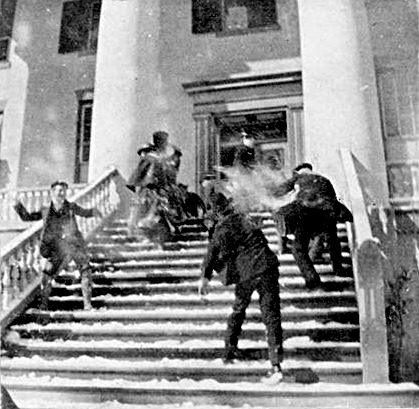
Citizens engaging in a snowball fight on the capitol steps during the Great Blizzard of 1899

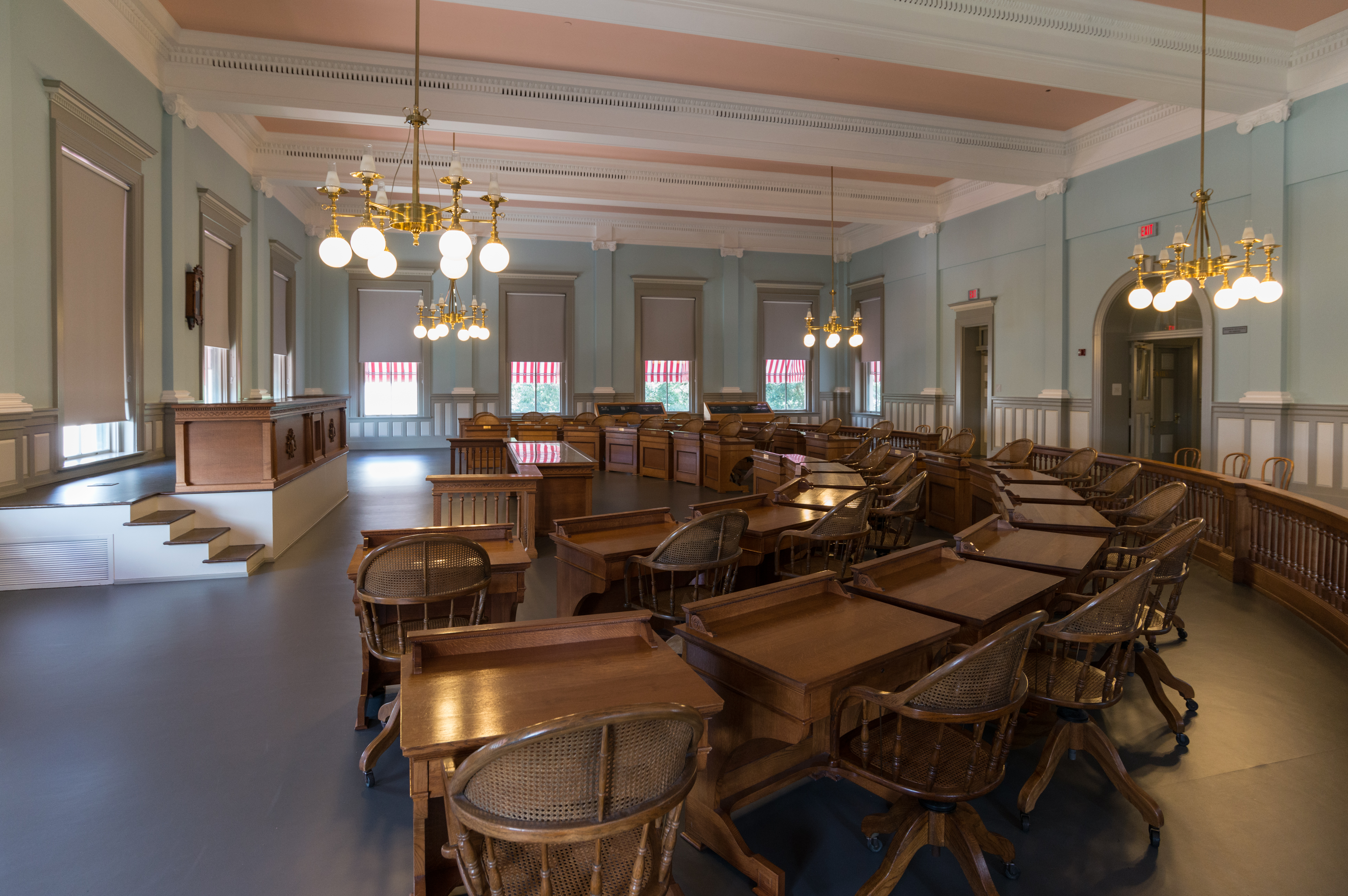
Former Senate chamber in the Old Capitol

In 1826, a more permanent capitol building was constructed on the grounds where the current capitol sits. The modest structure was originally intended to be just one wing of a much larger building, but was never completed and torn down in 1939 to make room for the current Old Capitol Structure. French naturalist Compte de Castelnau produced one of the only known sketches of the structure prior to its demolition.

The historic capitol building was completed in 1845, just prior to Florida's entry into the United States as the 27th state. Several additions to the historic capitol have been made throughout the years. Frank Pierce Milburn made the first expansion in 1902 by adding the classical style dome. In 1923, Henry Klutho additions included two new wings and a marble interior. Finally, large wings for the House and Senate chambers were added to the north and south ends of the building in 1936 and 1947, respectively.

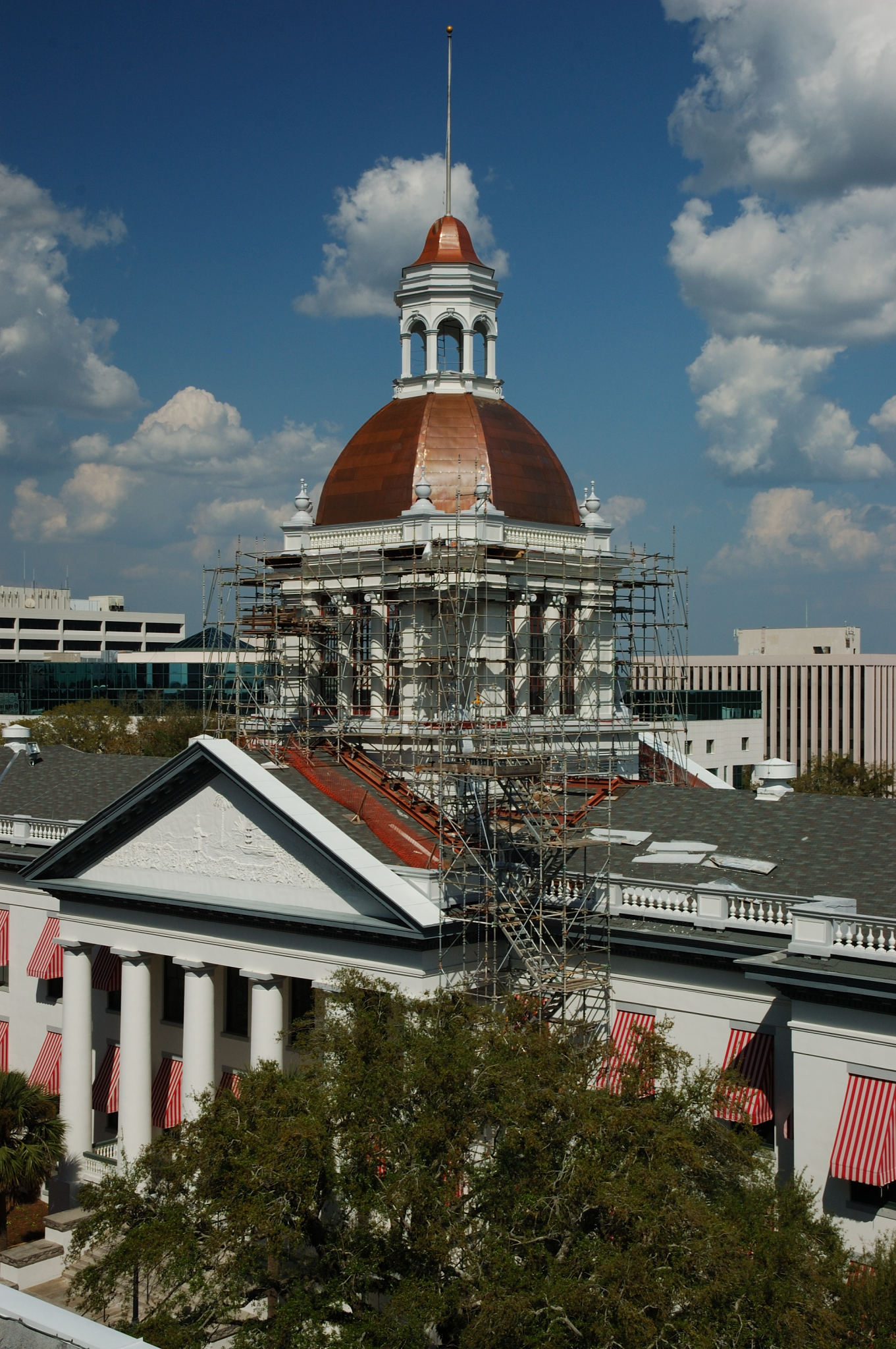
Completion of the renovations to the Historic Capitol's Dome

The 1902 Capitol building was the last statehouse in which all of Florida's political business was housed under one roof. A decade later, the Florida Supreme Court moved into its own building just west of the Capitol Complex, across S. Duval Street.

=== The decision to build a new capitol ===
The 1960s were a time of political renewal in Florida that led to the Constitution of 1968 and the end of the Pork Chop Gang. The thrust of the renewal was to force conservative, north Florida politicians to cede power to the greatly expanded (in population and economic power) central and south Florida, until then seriously underrepresented in the legislature. As part of this discussion, the possible relocation of Florida's capital (convenient only to the north Floridians) closer to the state's center of population was considered.

As a result of efforts like South Florida State Senator Lee Weissenborn, North Florida legislators successfully were able to pass the expansion of the Capitol complex in Tallahassee, effectively ending efforts to move the capital to Orlando.

=== The decision to preserve the Old Capitol ===
The architects who designed the New Capitol were given the starting assumption the Old Capitol — which had to remain in use until the New Capitol was completed — would be removed. Therefore, the design of the New Capitol in no way reflected the style of the old one. The site design, also, was prepared under the assumption the space occupied by the Old Capitol would be vacant. Since the preservation movement did not begin until after the New Capitol had been completed, and the demolition was being prepared for, it was too late to make any changes to either the New Capitol or the site.

The Historic Capitol was saved through citizens' action led by Secretary of State Bruce Smathers and then wife Nancy McDowell. The efforts were successful and the building was restored to its 1902 appearance, the final House and Senate chambers having been demolished (though there are no surviving drawings or photographs to inform restoration of the interior). Architectural highlights include the elaborate art glass dome, red and white striped awnings, and a representation of the Florida State Seal over the entry columns.

In 2011, the Florida Department of Management Services, in conjunction with MLD Architects, began restoration of the Historic Capitol's cupola, which included new copper roofing, and Tallahassee's most photographed landmark unveiled its new dome in April 2012.

== The New Capitol ==
=== Architecture and layout ===
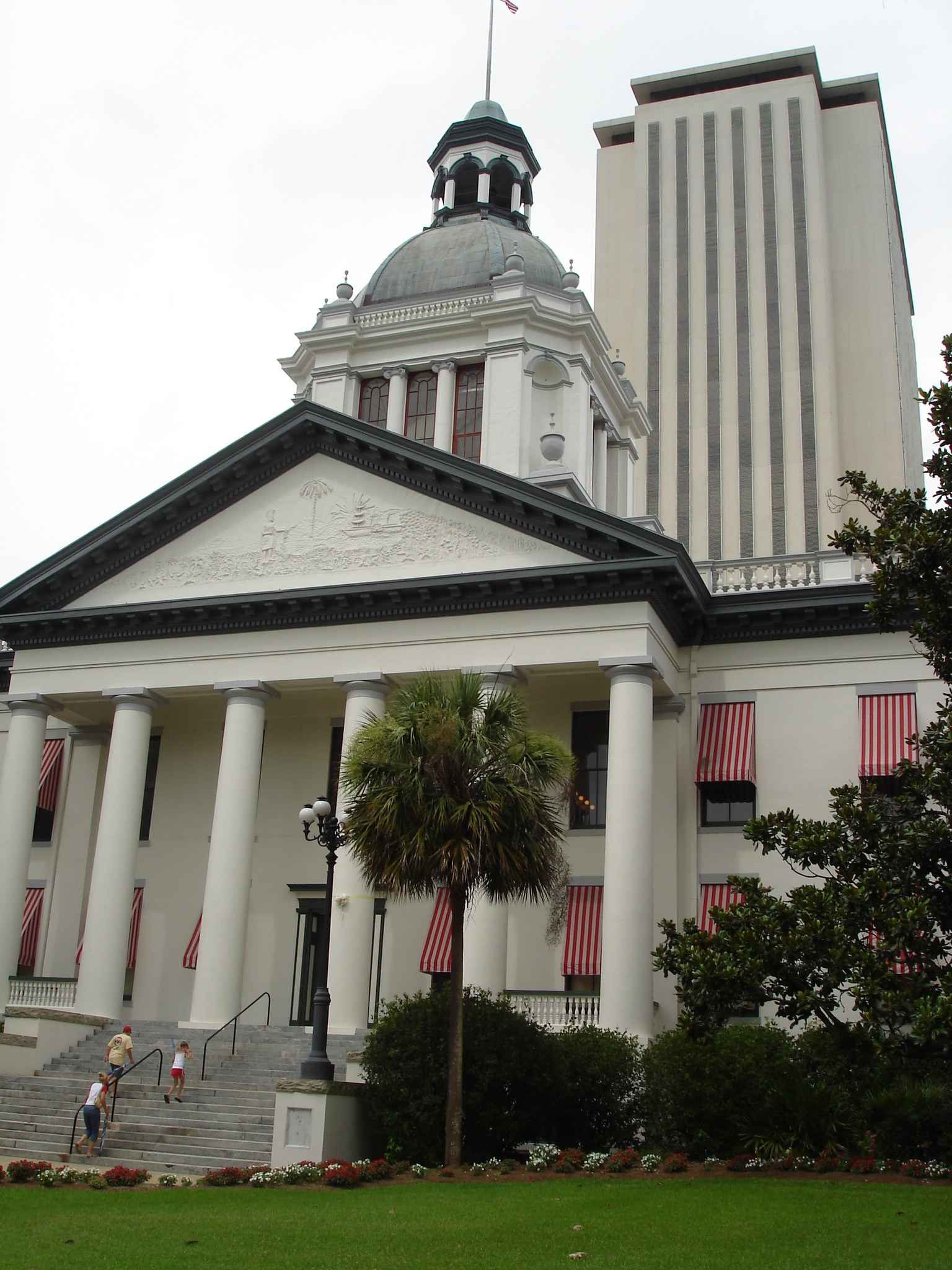
Florida Capitol buildings (Old Capitol in the foreground)

The current Capitol Complex design was a joint venture of the architectural firms of Edward Durell Stone & Associates of New York City and Reynolds, Smith & Hills of Jacksonville. The Capitol is a concrete building designed in the New Formalist style with metal louvers shading the windows. The design symbolized the modern development of Florida.

The Capitol is usually referred to as a twenty-two-story building with a height of 345 feet (105 m). However, including the three underground floors, it is a 25-story building (though the sixth floor is only accessible through the freight elevator). The Governor and the Cabinet members have their offices on the Plaza Level of the Capitol. Floors two through four of the base structure of the Capitol are used for the chambers of the Senate and House of Representatives; the offices of the Senate President, Secretary and Sergeant at Arms; the House Speaker, Clerk, and Sergeant at Arms; some legislative committee offices and meeting rooms; and Member offices.

The Legislative Chambers are on the fourth floor with their respective public viewing galleries on the fifth floor. The floors between the observation deck and the first five floors are executive and legislative offices. There is a cafeteria on the lower level, a snack bar on the tenth floor, and the Florida Welcome Center just inside the west Plaza Level entrance. Florida Welcome Center staff conducts guided tours for groups of 15 or more and self-guided tours are available during business hours. The Senate office building and the House office building are each four stories high and on either end of the Capitol Complex. The bridges on the second and third floors allow people to walk between the Capitol and office buildings. These buildings contain primarily committee meeting rooms and legislative offices. The Knott Building to the south was attached to the Capitol by a skywalk in 1999. The west front is known formally as Waller Park, for Curtis L. Waller, Judge of the United States Circuit Court of Appeals. In 2003, the dolphin statue "Stormsong" by Tallahassee artist Hugh Nicholson was added within Waller Park's Florida Heritage Fountain.

== Points of interest ==
=== Capitol grounds ===
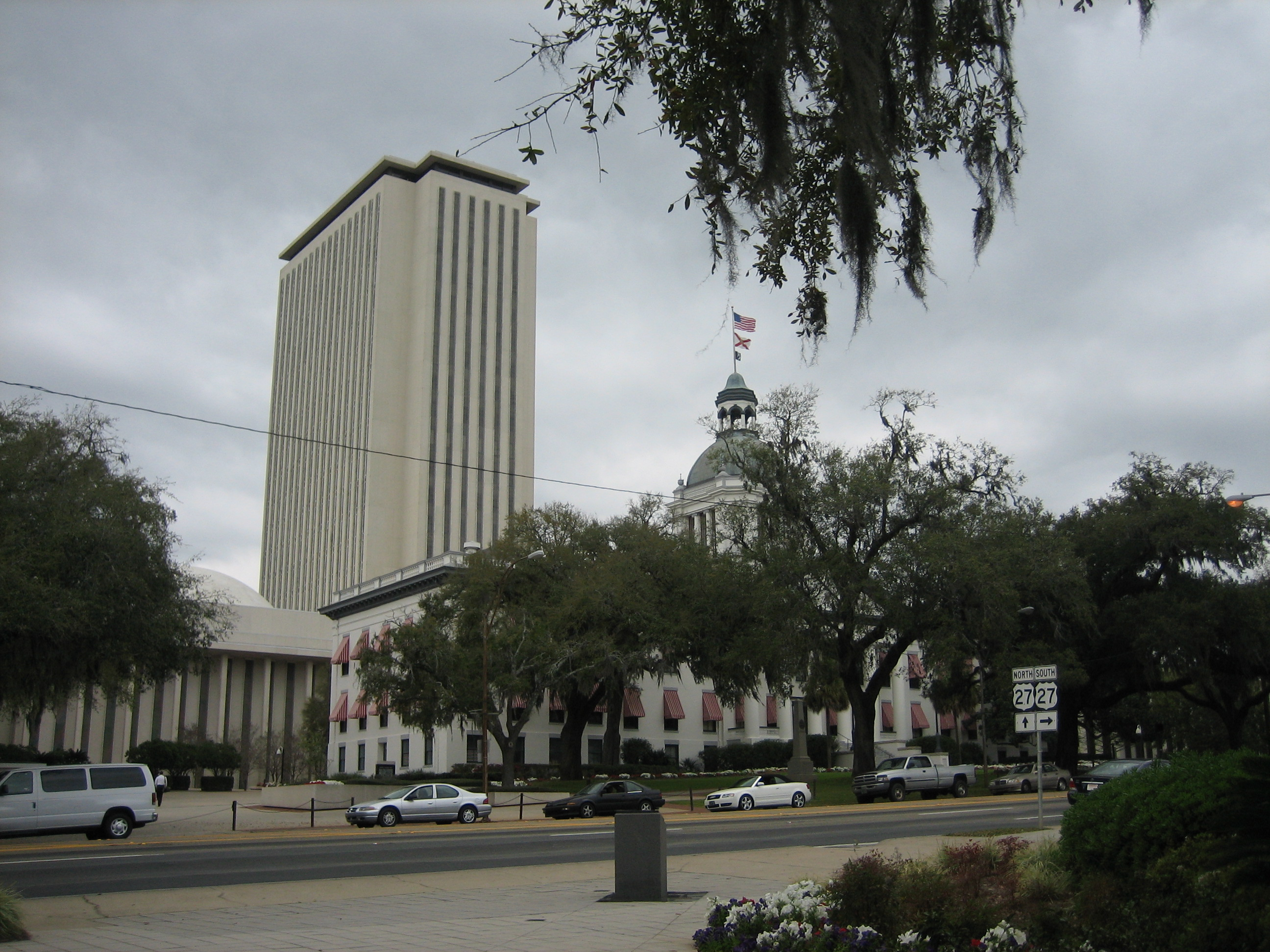
Grounds of the Florida State Capitol

On the northeast corner of the Capitol Complex is the Florida Sri Chinmoy Peace State Marker. East of the House Office Building is a replica of the Liberty Bell. The replica was a gift to the citizens of Florida as a symbol of the 1950 United States Savings Bonds Independence Drive. Within the Capitol Courtyard is a memorial in remembrance of Dr. Martin Luther King Jr., dedicated in 1984. South of the King Memorial is The Florida Fraternal Order of Police Law Enforcement Memorial (dedicated in 2000). The memorial has the names of law enforcement officers killed in the line of duty. Outside of the Senate Office Building is a monument dedicated to Floridians who have received the Purple Heart medal.

On the lawn of the Old Capitol sit two marble obelisks. The northern one is the Leon County Civil War Memorial; The memorial commemorates Floridian Confederate soldiers who fought in the U.S Civil War.

The Capitol Complex grounds are maintained by the Florida Department of Management Services.

==== The Capitol ====
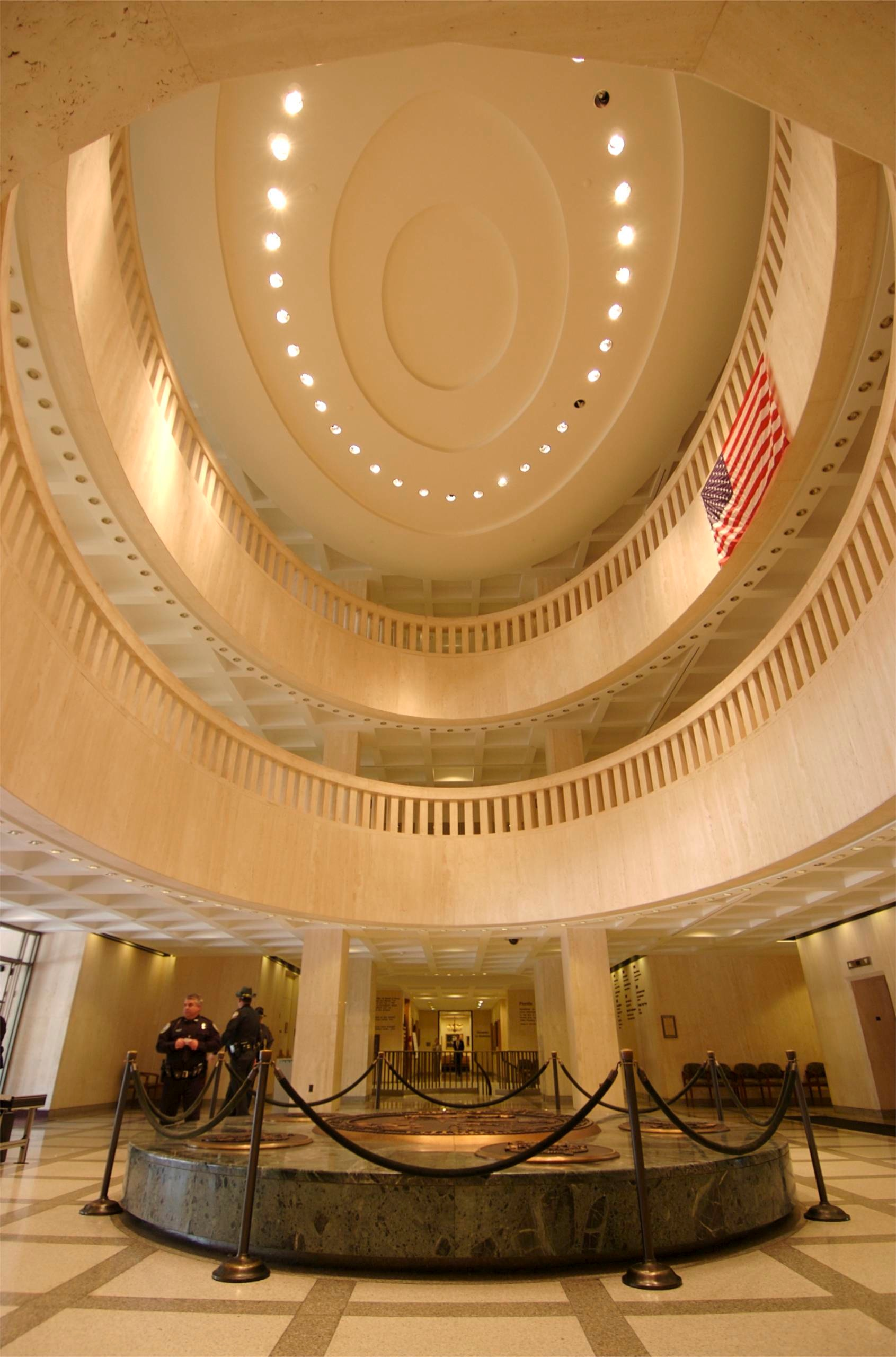
Florida State Capitol interior

The Plaza Level holds several items of note besides the offices of the Governor and the Cabinet. In the Rotunda, a copy of the State Seal cast in bronze is mounted on terra verde marble sits. This is not the current seal, but one in use when building was completed. It is surrounded by five smaller seals representing the nations and kingdoms that exerted sovereignty over all or parts of Florida (France, Spain, Great Britain, the Confederate States of America, and the United States). North of the Rotunda is the Florida Women's Hall of Fame and the Fallen Firefighters Wall of Honor. To the south are the Florida Artists Hall of Fame and a memorial for Florida's Medal of Honor recipients. Southwest of the Rotunda is the Heritage Chapel, an area designed to serve as a meditative space. Opposite to the Chapel is a plaque that states: "This plaque is dedicated to Senator Lee Weissenborn whose valiant effort to move the Capitol to Orlando was the prime motivation for the construction of this building." The west Plaza Level is the Florida Welcome Center and the "Images of the Sunshine State" murals by Florida artist James Rosenquist. The Florida Welcome Center offers maps, brochures, including a self-guided tour pamphlet, and related information.

The public viewing galleries for the Florida House of Representatives and the Florida Senate are on the fifth floor. A series of murals of Florida's history by Christopher Still encircle the House chamber floor. Outside of the Senate galleries is the Five Flags Mural by Renee Faure depicting people from Florida history.

The Observation Deck is the top or twenty-second floor of the Capitol building. The deck is 307 feet (94 m) above the Plaza Level and 512 feet (156 m) above sea level. In the east wing is an art gallery featuring a rotating display of artwork by Florida resident artists and a series of bronze plaques on the inductees of the Florida Artists Hall of Fame. The southern side is the Freedom Shrine. When conditions are clear, the capitol can be seen 20 miles away.

=== Florida Legislative Research Center & Museum ===
The capitol is home to the Florida Legislative Research Center & Museum, which features exhibits about Florida's legislative history. The archives include art, historic photographs, documents and oral histories. The Gallery at the Historic Capitol features changing exhibits of photographs from the museum.

== See also ==
- List of Florida state legislatures
- Florida Democratic Party
- Marshall Ledbetter
- Republican Party of Florida
- List of state and territorial capitols in the United States
