= Zeenat =

Zeenat, Zeenath, or Zinat is a feminine given name of Arabic origin. It may refer to:

== Given name ==
=== Zeenat ===
- Zeenath (born 1964), Indian actress
- Zeenath Abbas (born 1978), Maldivian actress
- Zeenat Aman (born 1951), Indian actress
- Zeenat Barkatullah, Bangladeshi dancer and actress
- Zeenat Begum (1931–2007), Indian/Pakistani classical singer
- Zeenat Bibi, Pakistani politician
- Zeenat Carelse (born 1966), South African judge
- Zeenat Abdullah Channa (1919–1974), Pakistani educator and writer
- Zeenat Karzai (born 1970), wife of former Afghanistan President Hamid Karzai
- Zeenat Anjum Khattak (1939–2017), or Fozia Anjum, Pakistani poet, educator, and broadcaster
- Zeenat Mahal (1823–1886), last Mughal empress
- Zeenat Mosharraf, Bangladeshi politician
- Zeenat Haroon Rashid (1928–2017), Pakistani women's rights activist
- Zeenat Shahwani, Pakistani politician
- Zeenat Siddiqui (born 1947), Pakistani folk singer
- Zeenat-un-Nissa, (1643–1721), Mughal empress

=== Zinat ===
- Zinat Ara (born 1953), Bangladeshi judge
- Zinat Pirzadeh (born 1967), Iranian-Swedish comedian
- Zinat Sanu Swagata, Bangladeshi actress

== Film and television ==
- Zeenat (1945 film), an Indian Hindustani-language film directed by Shaukat Hussain Rizvi
- Zeenat (1975 film), a Pakistani film directed by S. Suleman
- Zeenat (2018 film), an Indian Hindi-language film directed by Saandesh B. Nayak
- Zeenat (TV series), a 1991 Pakistani series
