= Medda =

Medda is an Italian and Indian surname. A very small portion of people in West Bengal, India have this surname. As an Italian surname it is of Sardinian origin where most people with the surname live in.

Some elders of this community from India say that a large number of people belonging to the Medda clan in India moved to Europe and North America in the early 1900s however there is no evidence which implies that the people of Sardinia, Italy having this surname are related to the people having the same surname in India. In India the surname 'Medda' is derived from the word 'Medha' which means 'Intellect' or 'Wisdom' in Sanskrit.

Notable people with the name include:

- Ambra Medda (born 1981), Greek designer
- Giampaolo Medda (1927–2017), Italian field hockey player
- Mario Medda (1943–1981), Italian modern pentathlete
- Michele Medda (born 1962), Italian comics writer

== See also ==
- Meddah
