= Louise Emanuel =

Child psychotherapist

Louise Emanuel

Louise Sharon Emanuel (10 December 1953 – 7 May 2017) was a pioneering child psychotherapist who developed new methods of accessing the inner world of the under fives.

== Selected publications ==
- Understanding your three year old. 2004.
- What can the matter be? Therapeutic interventions with parents, infants and young children. Karnac Books, 2008. (co-edited with Elizabeth Bradley)
