= Jayne Millington =

Senior air defence specialist with the Royal Air Force

Jayne Millington when she was Station Commander at RAF Boulmer.

Air Commodore Jayne Millington (11 January 1962 – 20 May 2017) was an air defence specialist with the Royal Air Force who was deputy chief of staff at NATO Allied Air Command in Germany after which she became UK national military representative at Supreme Headquarters Allied Powers Europe (SHAPE) in Belgium. She was closely involved with the ThrustSSC land speed record attempt.
