= André Bach =

French general and historian

- Born: 5 December 1943
- Died: 19 May 2017 (aged 73)
- Occupation: Historian

André Bach (5 December 1943 – 19 May 2017) was a French general and historian.

== Biography ==
Admitted to École spéciale militaire de Saint-Cyr in 1965 in the Lieutenant Colonel Driant class, he opted for the infantry upon graduation.

He was admitted to the École supérieure de guerre in 1978 through the university track. He graduated from the Sciences Po (Class of 1980) and holds a master’s degree in history from Paris 1 Panthéon-Sorbonne University (1981), with a thesis on Edmond Mendras, military attaché in the Soviet Union.

== Bibliography ==
- (en collaboration avec Jean Nicot et Guy Pedroncini) Les poilus ont la parole, Eds Complexe, 2003.
- Fusillés pour l'exemple – 1914-1915, Tallandier, 2003, ISBN 2-84734-040-8.
- L'armée de Dreyfus, Tallandier, 2004, (ouvrage doublement couronné en 2005 par le prix du Maréchal Foch décerné par l'Académie Française et par le prix Edmond Fréville de l'Académie des sciences morales et politiques).
- Justice militaire 1915-1916, Éditions Vendémiaire, 2013, 594 pages, ISBN 978-2-36358-048-1.
