= Hugh Marjoribanks =

Australian cricketer

Personal information
- Born: 12 August 1933; Mackay, Queensland, Australia
- Died: 3 May 2017 (aged 83)
- Source: ESPNcricinfo, 7 January 2017

Hugh Marjoribanks (12 August 1933 – 3 May 2017) was an Australian cricketer. He played four first-class matches for New South Wales in 1958/59.

== See also ==
- List of New South Wales representative cricketers
