= Peter Vogel (artist) =

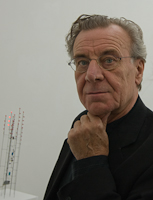
- Vogel in 2009
- Born: 9 March 1937; Freiburg im Breisgau, Germany
- Died: 8 May 2017 (aged 80); Freiburg im Breisgau, Germany
- Known for: Conceptual art, sound art, electronics

Peter Vogel (9 March 1937 – 8 May 2017) was a German artist, best known for his interactive electronic sculptures and sound art pieces.

== Life ==
Interaction was the artist's central intention, the viewer becomes a participant, a player who can influence the work through his impulses. Vogel was thus an exponent of a generation of artists who placed the viewer's participation at the center of their work. Even in the context of constructive-concrete and kinetic art, the goal is to combine art and life in order to provide the recipient with an active and sensual-aesthetic experience that goes beyond just looking at the picture.

After studying physics, Peter Vogel worked in Switzerland at Hoffmann-La Roche on brain research and the development of medical devices. He was particularly interested in cybernetics and neurobiological processes. In addition to electronic music, this was the access to his artistic concept. Cybernetics, music and performance were the cornerstones of his actions. Early on Vogel composed electronic music, worked in the theater and made and modified electronic instruments.

Vogel died on 8 May 2017, aged 80.

== Exhibitions ==
In 2011, the first retrospective of his work took place at the University of Brighton curated by Jean Martin and Conall Gleeson. In 2011, the University of Brighton, England, exhibited his works, including sculptures which move when a viewer's shadow touches them.
