= Richard Summers (RAF officer) =

RAF officer (1921–2017)

Richard Gordon Battensby Summers
- Born: 18 October 1921; Beverley, Yorkshire
- Died: 7 May 2017 (aged 95)
- Military career
- Allegiance: United Kingdom
- Branch: Royal Air Force
- Service years: 1939-1968
- Rank: Wing Commander
- Nickname: Dick
- Conflicts: Second World War: Battle of Britain; Mau Mau Uprising
- Awards: Officer of the Order of the British Empire; Air Force Medal

Wing Commander Richard Gordon Battensby Summers, OBE, AFM (18 October 1921 – 7 May 2017) was a Royal Air Force officer who served as an observer during the Battle of Britain, and was one of the last surviving men known as "The Few".

== Early life ==
Summers was born in Beverley, Yorkshire, on 18 October 1921 and was educated at Ermysted's Grammar School in Skipton.

== Royal Air Force career ==
Upon leaving school aged 18, Summers joined the Royal Air Force (RAF). He flew with No. 219 Squadron RAF during the Battle of Britain. After the battle he joined the Ferry Pool and Defence Flight at Takoradi, West Africa. In July 1941, Summers crash-landed on a beach in Liberia. To avoid being captured he walked 48 miles barefoot before taking to the sea, where he was picked up by a passing British merchantman.

Summers was awarded the Air Force Medal in 1941 for successfully evading capture. He was commissioned in May 1942 and posted back to the UK. On 12 October 1942 he joined No. 1 (Coastal) Operational Training Unit as bomber leader, flying the Lockheed Hudson. Summers was posted to No. 48 Squadron RAF at RAF Gibraltar on 22 May 1943, again as Bombing Leader, and on 1 March 1944 he was posted to be bombing leader at No. 1 APC at RAF Aldergrove. He continued to hold a number of armament office positions until the end of the war.

From 1953 to 1956, Summers was deputy station commander at RAF Eastleigh, Kenya, during the Mau Mau Uprising. Summers was appointed an Officer of the Order of the British Empire for his "gallant and distinguished services" in 1956. He was promoted to wing commander in 1958, and retired from the RAF in 1968.

== Death ==
Summers died on 7 May 2017, aged 95.
