= Grzegorz Kosma =

Polish handball player (1957–2017)

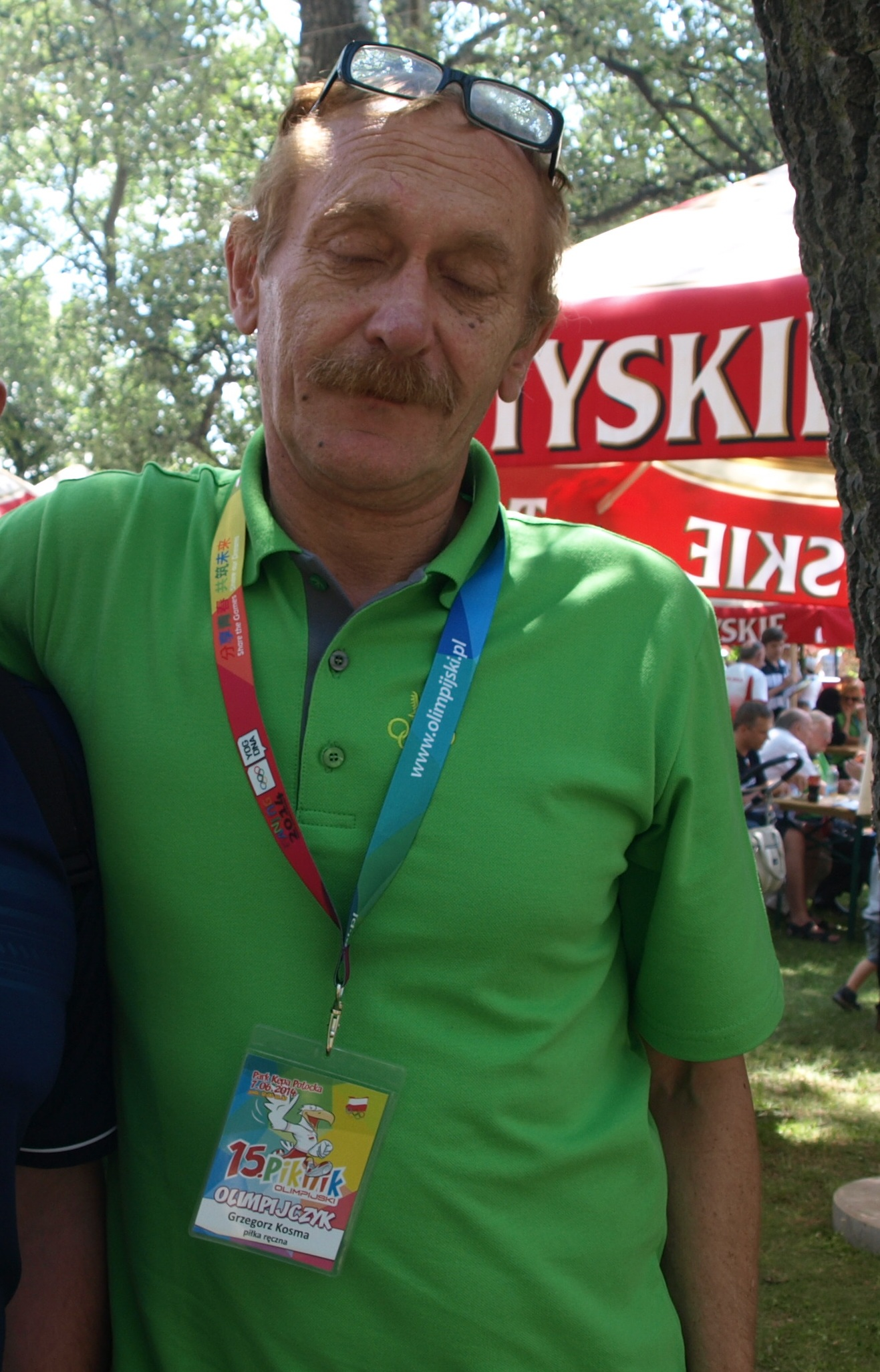
Grzegorz Stanisław Kosma

Grzegorz Stanisław Kosma (2 March 1957 in Łódź – 6 May 2017) was a Polish handball player who competed in the 1980 Summer Olympics.

In 1980 he was part of the Polish team which finished seventh in the Olympic tournament. He played five matches and scored three goals. Kosma died on 6 May 2017, aged 60.
