= Joyce Sullivan (mezzo-soprano) =

Joyce Anna Sullivan (née Solomon, July 4, 1929 – May 14, 2017) was a Canadian mezzo-soprano and radio and television host who had an active performance career from 1947 until her retirement in 1970.

== Life and career ==
Born Joyce Anna Solomon in Toronto, she was educated as a vocalist at The Royal Conservatory of Music in her native city. From 1947 to 1954 she was a member of the Leslie Bell Singers; appearing with them in concerts and on radio and television. She also sang regularly on Jack Arthur's radio program Mr. Showbusiness and had her own radio program on CBC Radio in the early 1950s. From 1957 to 1959 she co-hosted the CBC Television program Showcase with Robert Goulet, and in 1960 she was host of the CBC radio program Talk of the Town. She appeared frequently as a soloist in concerts and on record with the Carl Tapscott Singers in the 1960s. She recorded the albums Folk Songs of Canada (1956) and The Songs of Joyce Sullivan (1965). Sullivan died on May 14, 2017, at the age of 87.
