= Rita Kerr =

American author (1925-2017)

Rita Kerr (October 29, 1925 – May 19, 2017) was an author of books for children and young adults. Works include The Good Old Days, Dearie Deer, Gray Eagle: The Story of a Creek Indian Boy, and The Texas Cowboy.

According to WorldCat, The Alamo cat is held by 683 libraries and Juan Seguin, a hero of Texas is held in 557; Girl of the Alamo is held by 534 libraries and Tex's tales in 525.
