= Rekha Sindhu =

Indian actress and model

Rekha Sindhu (16 July 1994 – 5 May 2017) was an Indian actress and model known for her work in Kannada and Tamil TV Programs.

She died in a car crash on the Chennai-Bengaluru Highway on 5 May 2017.
