= Takie Lebra =

Takie Sugiyama Lebra
- Born: February 6, 1930; Shizuoka Prefecture, Japan
- Died: May 26, 2017 (aged 87); Honolulu, Hawaii, York, U.S.
- Education: B.A. in Political Science, Gakushuin University (1954), M.A. in Political Science, University of Pittsburgh (1960), PhD in Sociology, University of Pittsburgh (1967)
- Occupations: Anthropologist, professor, board member
- Spouse: William P. Lebra

Takie Sugiyama Lebra (February 6, 1930 – May 26, 2017) was a Japanese anthropologist and professor. Her “contributions to the anthropology of Japan are regarded as foundational”.

She was born in a rural village in Shizuoka Prefecture, Japan. She attended primary school in Japan, graduating from Tsuda College in Tokyo in 1951. She graduated from Gakushuin University in Tokyo with a BA in political science in 1954 and then completed her studies at the University of Pittsburgh, receiving an MA in political science in 1960 and a PhD in sociology (also from the University of Pittsburgh) in 1967.

Lebra was a professor in the Department of Anthropology at the University of Hawaii from 1971 until her retirement in 1996. She also held visiting positions at the University of Washington, the University of Michigan, Oxford Brookes University, Harvard University, and the National University of Singapore. She was a popular teacher with her courses (especially in Japanese Studies) attracting many students. While teaching in Hawaii, she was a specialist of Japan, of psychological anthropology and of culture and social organization. She was also an author, having written 7 books about Japanese culture and selling over 66,000 copies. She has won multiple awards, including a John Simon Guggenheim Fellowship, a Fulbright Council for International Exchange, a Wenner-Gren Foundation for Anthropological Research, a Japan Foundation Research Fellowship. She also received awards from the Joint Committee on Japanese Studies of the American Council of Learned Societies and the Social Science Research Council. She was a board member for the Society for Psychological Anthropology, the US-Japan Women's Journal and the Journal of Japanese Studies. Her 1976 book, Japanese Patterns of Behavior provides an overview of contemporary Japanese cultural norms and devotes a chapter to a case study of the Salvation Cult. Her 1995 book Above the Clouds, Status Culture of the Modern Japanese Nobility was the first ethnographic study of the modern Japanese aristocracy, in which she explained the Kazoku, the hereditary peerage of the Empire of Japan.

An obituary sums up her career as follows: “Takie Lebra will be remembered for her feistiness that combined probing intellect with humor. For her many students and colleagues, she demonstrated that the life of the mind should never forget the body, that we are driven as whole creatures that embrace emotions, relationships, institutions, and ideas. She taught that we are only and always too human, and in the end, that may be enough.”
