= David A Ramey =

American artist

David Alexander Ramey, Sr. (January 10, 1939 – May 17, 2017), was an American artist. He was born in Ridgeway, Virginia, but moved to Roanoke in 1949, where he later became a Conductor (rail) on the Norfolk and Western Railroad in 1974.

== Biography ==
David Ramey began making drawings of funny events he witnessed while working on the railroad, and also made sketches on the back of envelopes to amuse his family and friends. His skill came from watching his father draw, and he made color pencil drawings of his neighborhood and the Henry Street section of Roanoke. He also drew portraits and made images of the Hotel Roanoke, the Gainsboro Branch of the Roanoke City Public Library, St. Andrew's Roman Catholic Church (Roanoke, Virginia) and the N&W J class (1941) steam engine. At one time he desired to become an art teacher in the schools, but that ambition never came to pass. He was later offered a job as a drafter for the railroad, but turned it down since it required being away from his family. Ramey’s interest in art began when he was 5 years old. “I used to watch my dad scribble on a piece of paper,” he said, and, imitating his father, started to teach himself how to draw. By the time he had art classes in school, “what they were teaching me, I already knew.”

"Educator and artist Charlene Graves, a former Roanoke Arts Commission member, was the first to champion Ramey’s work, arranging exhibitions and talks. In his drawings, “I saw pictures of things in Henry Street that I could not find pictures of in reality,” she said in 2013." A local folk art gallery also supported his work, calling his historical images of Henry Street realistic, and made from memory, and not from photographs. Ramey died on May 17, 2017.

== Recognition and awards ==
"In 2014, Ramey received a Citizen of the Year award in the arts from the Roanoke branch of the National Association for the Advancement of Colored People."

In 2017, "Henry Street" by David Ramey was chosen to one of the "Art on the Bus" images to promote Roanoke on the sides of the city bus.

== Bibliography ==
- Ramey, David. The Times and Life on Henry Street. Roanoke, Va.: D. Ramey, 2012. 60 unnumbered pages, comb binding: illustrations, color pencil drawings by the author.
- Ramey, David. "Henry Street Bridge". IN: Scarborough, Sheree. African American Railroad Workers of Roanoke: Oral Histories of the Norfolk and Western. 2014. Internet resource.
