= Eberhard Spiecker =

German Lutheran clergyman

Eberhard Spiecker (2 August 1931 - 13 May 2017) was a German Lutheran clergyman who played a key and unreported role in the Northern Ireland peace process. He died in May 2017.
