= D.G.H. Latzko =

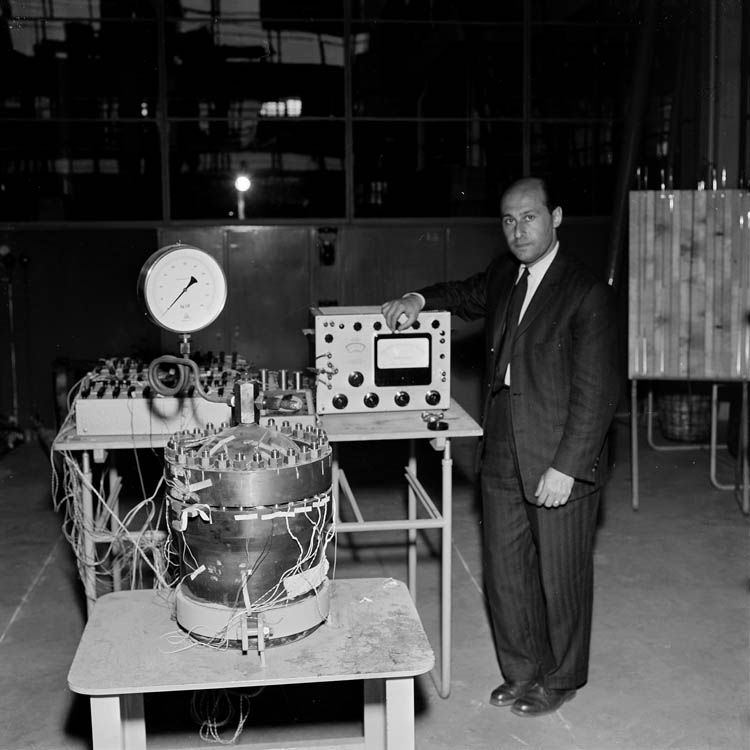
Ir. D.G.H. Latzko at Technische Hogeschool Delft, 1961

Desiderius Gustav Hermann "Dirk" Latzko (3 February 1924 – 4 May 2017) was a Dutch mechanical engineer. He was a professor of mechanical engineering at Delft University of Technology from 1961 to 1988. Latzko focused on the construction of nuclear reactors.

Latzko was born in Salzburg, Austria as son of the writer Andreas Latzko. He went to high school in Amsterdam and in 1949 obtained his degree in mechanical engineering from the Delft University of Technology. In 1958 Latzko obtained a diploma in nuclear engineering from the Harwell Reactor School.

Latzko was elected a member of the Royal Netherlands Academy of Arts and Sciences in 1980. He died in Bloemendaal on 4 May 2017.
