= Jan Fontein =

Jan Fontein (22 May 1927 – 19 May 2017) was a Dutch art historian and former museum director. From 1966 to 1992 he served as curator of Asiatic art at the Museum of Fine Arts, Boston. Fontein was its director from 1975 to 1987.

== Career ==
Fontein was born on 22 May 1927 in Naarden. From 1945 to 1953 he studied far eastern languages and Indonesian archaeology at Leiden University. In 1947 Fontein started working as assistant curator at the Museum of Asiatic Art in Amsterdam. In 1955 he became curator of the same museum.

In 1966 Fontein obtained his PhD under Theodoor Paul Galestin at Leiden University, with a dissertation titled: The Pilgrimage of Sudhana, A Study of Gandavyþha illustrations in China, Japan, and Java. That same year Fontein moved to the United States, where he became curator of Asian Art at the Museum of Fine Arts, Boston. He was director of the Museum from 1975 to 1987. He laid down his position as curator in 1992. From 1990 to 1996 Fontein was Bishop White Visiting Scholar at the Royal Ontario Museum.

Fontein was elected a correspondent of the Royal Netherlands Academy of Arts and Sciences in 1967. He was made commander in the Japanese Order of the Sacred Treasure.

Fontein died in Newton Upper Falls on 19 May 2017, aged 89.
