= Anne Morrissy Merick =

American journalist, war correspondent (1933–2017)

- Merick in 1954
- Born: Anne Louise Morrissy; October 28, 1933; Manhattan, New York City, U.S.
- Died: May 2, 2017 (aged 83); Naples, Florida, U.S.
- Education: Cornell University
- Occupation: Journalist
- Spouses: Wendell S. Merick (m. 1969; died 1988) Don S. Janicek (m. 2002; died 2016)
- Children: 1

Anne Louise Morrissy Merick (October 28, 1933 – May 2, 2017) was an American journalist who persuaded the Pentagon to reverse an order, known as the "Westmoreland Edict", which effectively prevented female reporters from accompanying troops to the front lines in the Vietnam War.

== Early life and education ==
Merick was born in Manhattan, New York City, on October 28, 1933. As a student sports journalist in the 1950s at Cornell University, she received national attention for her struggle to succeed despite sexism. She was the first woman sports editor at Cornell, and the first woman journalist credentialed for the press box at prestigious universities such as Cornell and Yale University.

== Career ==
While working in Saigon for ABC, Merick and Ann Bryan Mariano organized women journalists to meet with the Ministry of Defense, who subsequently reversed the order issued by William Westmoreland that forbade women to be with troops overnight.

== Death ==
Merick, who suffered from dementia later in life, died on May 2, 2017, in Naples, Florida.
