= Murder of Reese Bowman =

Murder of 8-month-old child

Reese Bowman
- Born: Reese Annette Bowman; September 4, 2016
- Died: May 23, 2017 (aged 8 months 19 days); Rocket Tiers Learning Center, Baltimore, Maryland, US
- Cause of death: Asphyxiation by smothering
- Parent(s): Justin and Amy Bowman

On May 23, 2017, 8-month-old Reese Annette Bowman (September 4, 2016 – May 23, 2017) was smothered to death by daycare worker Leah Walden in Baltimore, Maryland, United States. Walden pleaded guilty to the first-degree murder of Bowman on November 27, 2018, and was sentenced to 70 years in prison.

== Background ==
Justin and Amy Bowman brought their two children, Sawyer and Reese, to Rocket Tiers Learning Center in Baltimore, Maryland, on May 23, 2017.

At the time, Leah Walden was a 24-year-old daycare worker at Rocket Tiers. When Leah Walden returned from lunch to Rocket Tiers Learning Center, she found that Reese Bowman would not nap. Walden told a co-worker: "Girl, I'm frustrated ... I'm sick of this little bitch. I hate this little bitch. ... She makes me want to punch her in the face." Walden slapped Reese in the crib, then pinned the infant down with one arm as Reese's legs thrashed in desperation. Walden subsequently put a number of blankets over the child's face and smothered her to death.

The assault on Bowman by Walden was caught on camera. Baltimore's Criminal Investigations Chief Stanley Bradford said: "Watching that video is disturbing. Reese Bowman, in my opinion, was tortured." Walden initially claimed that Bowman's death was accidental. Later, she pleaded guilty to the first-degree murder at trial on November 27, 2018, and was sentenced to 70 years imprisonment. Rocket Tiers Learning Center closed permanently as a result of the murder.
