= Charles Hoffer =

American music educator (1929–2017)

Dr. Charles R. Hoffer (December 12, 1929 – May 3, 2017) was an American music educator.

== Life and teaching career ==
Hoffer was born in East Lansing, Michigan in 1929. His father was a sociology professor at Michigan State University and his mother became a stay-at-home mother after a year of nursing. He grew up playing the piano then switched to clarinet, which he continued to play in both high school and college. He completed his bachelor's degree in Music Education at Michigan State University. Dr. Hoffer completed his master's degree in Clarinet Performance at the Eastman School of Music, then his PhD from Michigan State University.

After completing his degree, Dr. Hoffer taught public school in Michigan, New York, and Missouri. After 14 years of teaching, he accepted a position on the faculty at Indiana University at Bloomington (1966). In 1984 he joined the University of Florida, where he became head of the music education area. Dr. Hoffer was often hired to teach summer sessions at institutions such as the Peabody Conservatory and University of Michigan.

== Philosophy ==
Hoffer admitted to first focusing on ratings at competitions, but after the tragic loss of a student, he began to question what his students were gaining in the long-term from his teaching. This inspired him to show videos, play examples, and do whatever would be beneficial for his students. When he was asked to serve on the committee to create state and national standards, Dr. Hoffer firmly supported the inclusion of practical standards that would make a difference in teachers’ lives. To advocate for music education, Dr. Hoffer utilized a set of questions he considered basic necessities, such as "Can students recognize when the theme comes back? Do they know what a fugue is?". He believed that all children deserve the right to an education in music so that they can recognize the basics of music throughout the rest of their lives. (C. Hoffer, personal communication, October 23, 2015)

=== Contributions to music education ===
Hoffer has been president of the Indiana Music Educators Association, president of the North Central Division of MENC, and national president of the MENC: The National Association for Music Education (now NAfME). Not only did he help write Florida's Sunshine State Standards, but also served on the committee that wrote the National Standards in Music.

== Awards ==
Hoffer was elected into the National Association for Music Education Hall of Fame in 2005. He was recognized at the 60th MENC National Biennial In-Service Conference in April 2006 held in Salt Lake City, Utah.

== List of publications ==
- Hoffer, Charles R. (1 November 1954). "Research and the Music Teacher". Music Educators Journal. 41 (2): 20–22. doi:10.2307/3387994. JSTOR 3387994. S2CID 144772508.
- Hoffer, Charles Russell (1955). A study of the common efforts of the community orchestra and the public school music program in providing listening experiences for school students (Thesis). OCLC 25504726.
- Hoffer, C. R., & Hoffer, M. L. (1976). Basic musicianship for classroom teachers: A creative musical approach. Belmont, CA: Wadsworth Publishing Company.
- Hoffer, Charles R. (May 1986). "Standards in Music Education What are They? Why are They Important?". Music Educators Journal. 72 (9): 50–51. doi:10.2307/3396642. JSTOR 3396642. S2CID 143558517.
- Hoffer, M. L., & Hoffer, C. R. (1987). Music in the elementary classroom: Musicianship and teaching. San Diego: Harcourt Brace Jovanovich.
- Hoffer, C. R. (1988). A concise introduction to music listening. Belmont, CA: Wadsworth Publishing Company.
- Hoffer, Charles R. (September 1988). "Critical Issues in Music Education". Music Educators Journal. 75 (1): 18–21. doi:10.2307/3398039. JSTOR 3398039. S2CID 144292430.
- Hotter, Charles R. (April 1988). "Information Others about Music Education". Music Educators Journal. 74 (8): 30–33. doi:10.2307/3398007. JSTOR 3398007. S2CID 149127518.
- Hoffer, Charles R. (1989). "Coda: The MENC Professional Certification Program". Music Educators Journal. 76 (2): 76–75. doi:10.2307/3400953. JSTOR 3400953. S2CID 221047003.
- Hoffer, C. R. (1989). The understanding of music. Belmont, CA: Wadsworth Publishing Company.
- Hoffer, C. R. (1991). Teaching music in the secondary schools. Belmont, CA: Wadsworth Publishing Company.
- Hoffer, C. R. (2002). Introduction to music education. Prospect Heights, Ill: Waveland Press.
