= Manuel Rodriguez Sr. =

Filipino printmaker (1912–2017)

- Born: January 1, 1912; Cebu, Philippine Islands
- Died: May 6, 2017 (aged 105); Florida, U.S.
- Education: University of the Philippines
- Known for: Painting, Printmaking

Manuel Antonio Rodriguez Sr. (January 1, 1912 – May 6, 2017), also known by his nickname Mang Maning, was a Filipino printmaker. He was one of the pioneers of printmaking in the Philippines and was dubbed as the "Father of Philippine Printmaking". Rodriguez was also the first Filipino to have exhibited his prints in biennial shows held outside the country. He also established the Philippine Association of Printmakers in 1968.
