= Mahendra Gupte =

Indian cricket umpire (1931–2017)

Personal information
- Born: 11 April 1931
- Died: 7 May 2017 (aged 86)

Umpiring information
- Tests umpired: 1 (1985)
- ODIs umpired: 1 (1983)
- Source: ESPNcricinfo, 7 July 2013

Mahendra Gupte (11 April 1931 – 7 May 2017) was an Indian cricket umpire. Almost all of his umpiring was at the first-class level. He only officiated in two international fixtures, a Test match between India and England in 1985, and an ODI game between India and the West Indies in 1983.

== See also ==
- List of Test cricket umpires
- List of One Day International cricket umpires
