= Dennis H. Farber =

American painter

The Death of President Coolidge by Dennis Farber, Honolulu Museum of Art

Dennis "Denny" H. Farber (March 8, 1946 – May 8, 2017) was an American painter, photographer and educator. Faber was the director of the Mount Royal School of Art at Maryland Institute College of Art (MICA) from 2000 to 2004 and co-chair of MICA’s Foundations department from 2010 to 2011.

== About ==
He received a B.A. from Trinity College, in Hartford, Connecticut, in 1968 and an M.F.A. from Claremont Graduate University, Claremont, California, in 1975.

Farber was a recipient New York Foundation for the Arts Grant in 1987. He was also awarded a National Endowment for the Arts Grant in 1995, two residencies at Yaddo in 2004 and 2008, Saratoga Springs, New York, and awarded a Mid Atlantic Council for the Arts Grant in 2005.

Farber's photographs run the gamut from street photography to manipulated images to painted photographs many of which are abstract. The majority of his photographs are large format 20 in × 24 in Polaroid prints. Most of his paintings are completely abstract, such as The Death of President Coolidge in the collection of the Honolulu Museum of Art.

Farber’s photographic work was a part of photography’s expanding boundaries in the 1970s and 1980s. Most of Farber’s pictures came from his collages of found images and re-photographed on the 20 × 24 Polaroid camera. He participated in Polaroid Corporation’s Artist Support Program. In 1992 his large format Polaroids were showcased in MoMA’s New Photography 8 exhibition. The same year his work was one six contemporary artists’ works in The Jewish Museum’s widely traveled exhibit, Bridges and Boundaries, African Americans and American Jews. The work was also included in The Edge of Childhood, Heckscher Museum, Huntington, New York, I, Diane Brown Gallery, New York, New York, The Pleasures and Terrors of Domestic Comfort, Baltimore Museum of Art, Baltimore, Maryland, which began the year before at MoMA, New York. Farber’s large format Polaroids were also included in OPEN ENDS, Innocence and Experience, Museum of Modern Art’s, (New York, New York) millennial exhibit.

== Educator ==
He was a professor at Iolani School, Honolulu, Hawaii, from 1969 to 1971, the University of New Mexico Albuquerque, New Mexico, from 1993 to 1998 and the Maryland Institute College of Art (MICA), Baltimore, Maryland, from 1998 to 2016.

Farber was also an influential teacher, first at the Iolani School, then at both undergraduate and graduate levels at the University of New Mexico (Albuquerque) from 1993 to 1998, and the Maryland Institute College of Art from 1998 to 2010 in the Foundation and Painting Departments. He also directed MICA’s Mount Royal Graduate School of Art from 2000 to 2004. While living in New York he taught as an adjunct at New York University (NYU). He served as an Associate Dean at both the University of New Mexico (College of Fine Art) and MICA (for the Foundation Department).

== Collections ==
Select public museum collections
Museum	Location	Work	Notes
Baltimore Museum of Art	Baltimore, Maryland		
Brooklyn Museum	Brooklyn, New York	Oxidized Memories (Pittsburgh, PA) (n.d.)	
Carnegie Museum of Art	Pittsburgh, Pennsylvania		
Center for Creative Photography	Tucson, Arizona		
Columbus Museum of Art	Columbus, Ohio		
Corcoran Gallery of Art	Washington, DC		
Honolulu Museum of Art	Honolulu, Ohau, Hawaii		
International Center of Photography	New York City, New York		
Jewish Museum	New York City, New York		
Long Beach Museum of Art	Long Beach, California		
Los Angeles County Museum of Art	Los Angeles, California	Wrapped in Stone (1986)	
Museum of Fine Arts, Houston	Houston, Texas	Divided Conscience (1986-1987)	
Museum of Modern Art (MoMA)	New York City, New York		
Museum of New Mexico	Santa Fe, New Mexico		
Orange County Museum of Art	Newport Beach, California		
Tokyo Metropolitan Museum of Photography	Tokyo, Japan	The Party (1988), Radiant Child (1991)	
