= C. Jackson Grayson =

American businessman

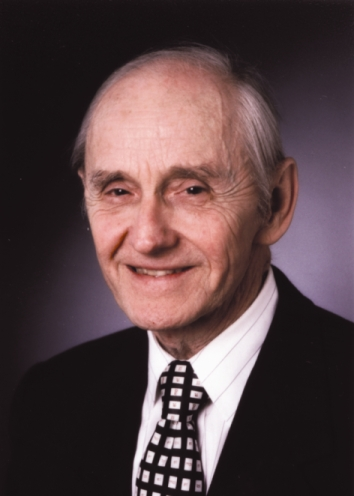
- Born: October 8, 1923; Fort Necessity, Louisiana, U.S.
- Died: May 4, 2017 (aged 93)
- Occupations: Productivity and quality improvement champion
- Spouse: Dr. Carla O'Dell

C. Jackson "Jack" Grayson, Jr. (October 8, 1923 – May 4, 2017) was the chairman of APQC, dean of two business schools, head of the U.S. Price Commission (1971), a farmer, newspaper reporter and FBI agent. In 1977 he founded APQC as a private sector, non-profit organization.

C. Jackson Grayson was the U.S. chairman of the Price Commission in the United States from 1971 to 1973 under President Richard Nixon. In that position under the Economic Stabilization Act of 1970, Grayson oversaw price controls and the process through which companies request permission to increase prices. Grayson gained exposure to productivity issues and how they related to product pricing. Grayson went on to found the American Productivity and Quality Center in 1977 where he resided as chairman and oversaw the organization's public education improvement initiatives.

== Professional experience ==
=== Education ===
B.B.A., Tulane University, 1944

M.B.A., Wharton School of the University of Pennsylvania, 1947

D.B.A., Harvard Business School, 1969

=== Academic career ===
- Instructor: School of Business Administration, Tulane University, 1947–1949
- Asst. Professor: School of Business Administration, Tulane University, 1953–1955
- Asst. Professor: Graduate School of Business Administration, Harvard University, 1958–1959
- Associate Professor: School of Business Administration, Tulane University, 1959–1963
- Associate Dean: School of Business Administration, Tulane University, 1961–1963
- Professor: IMDE:International Institute for Management Development, Management Development Institute, Switzerland, 1963–1964
- Visiting Professor: Graduate School of Business, Stanford University, Spring 1967
- Dean and Professor: School of Business Administration, Tulane University, 1963–1968
- Visiting Professor: INSEAD, Management Development Institute, Fontainebleau, France, Summers 1972, 1973, 1975
- Dean and Professor: School of Business Administration, Southern Methodist University, 1968–1975

=== Positions ===
- Certified Public Accountant, Louisiana, 1943–present
- Newspaper reporter, New Orleans Item, 1949–1950
- Special Agent, Federal Bureau of Investigation, Washington, D.C., 1950–1952
- Farm Manager, C. J. Grayson Farm, (cotton, cattle, soybeans) Fort Necessity, Louisiana, 1952
- Partner, James E. O'Neill & Associates, an export-import business, New Orleans, 1953
- Asst. to the Vice President for Development, Tulane University, New Orleans, 1953–1955
- Chairman, U.S. Price Commission, Washington, D.C., 1971–1973
- Chairman, American Productivity & Quality Center, 1975–present
- Consultant Panel, Comptroller General of the United States, 1978–1991
- Member of three Presidential Commissions:
- President Richard Nixon: U.S. Price Commission, 1971
- President Carter: Commission for a National Agenda for the 80's, 1980
- President Reagan: National Productivity Advisory Committee, 1982
- Retired member of the Board of Directors for Lever Bros., Sun Company, Overhead Door, Tyler Corporation, Whitman Corporation, Potlatch Corporation, Oryx Energy, Harris Corporation, Infomart, Browning-Ferris Industries
- Member of Board of Directors, Global Alliance for Transnational Education

== Bibliography ==
=== Articles and Monographs ===
Grayson has written over 60 monographs, papers, and articles in various publications.

=== Books ===
- Decisions Under Uncertainty: Drilling Decisions by Oil and Gas Operators, Division of Research, Harvard Business School, Harvard University, Boston, 1960
- Confessions of a Price Controller, Dow Jones-Irwin, Homewood, Illinois, 1974
- American Business: A Two-Minute Warning, co-authored with Carla O'Dell, The Free Press, New York, 1988
- If Only We Knew What We Know, co-authored with Carla O'Dell, The Free Press, New York, 1998

== Awards ==
- 2000 Named by Teleos, an English research firm, as one of the 10 “Most Admired Knowledge Leaders” in North America.
- 2003 The American Society for Quality (ASQ) awards Grayson its Distinguished Service Medal. The medal honors the lifetime contribution of any person who has been recognized as a long-term enabler, catalyst or prime mover in the quality movement.
- 2006 Southern Methodist University names an endowed MBA scholarship in entrepreneurial studies and an annual faculty innovation award in Grayson's honor.
