= William Polewarczyk =

American politician (??–2017)

Member of the New Hampshire House of Representatives from the Rockingham 4th district
- In office 2016 – May 6, 2017

Personal details
- Born: William S. Polewarczyk Jr. Clinton, Massachusetts, U.S.
- Died: May 6, 2017 (aged 69)
- Party: Republican

William S. Polewarczyk Jr. (died May 6, 2017) was an American politician. A member of the Republican Party, he served in the New Hampshire House of Representatives from 2016 to 2017.

Polewarczyk died of cancer at his home on May 6, 2017, at the age of 69.
