= Forrest M. Holly Jr. =

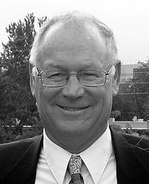
- Born: Forrest Merton Holly Jr. May 11, 1946; La Jolla, California, U.S.
- Died: May 22, 2017 (aged 71); Tucson, Arizona, U.S.
- Education: Colorado State University, Ph.D. Civil Engineering; University of Washington, M.S. Civil Engineering; Stanford University, B.S. Civil Engineering
- Known for: ] Dispersive mass transfer in Rivers and Estuaries >
- Awards: Elected Honorary Member, International Association for Hydro-Environment Engineering and Research, 2007; Arthur T. Ippen Award, IAHR; Harold J. Shoemaker Award, IAHR; Hunter Rouse Hydraulic Engineering Award, American Society of Civil Engineers
- Scientific career
- Fields: Computational Hydraulics
- Workplaces: Iowa Institute of Hydraulic Research The University of Iowa; Société Grenobloise d'Etudes et d'Applications Hydrauliques, France; U.S. Army Corps of Engineers Waterways Experiment Station
- Doctoral advisor: D.B. Simons

Forrest Merton Holly Jr. (May 11, 1946 – May 22, 2017) was an American civil engineering professor, an hydraulician and the co-inventor of the Holly-Preissmann scheme for simulating transport of contaminants and suspended sediments in rivers. Holly was an expert in computational hydraulics, dispersion in natural waters, alluvial river processes, urban hydraulics, thermal transport in rivers, and irrigation control systems with interest the solution of practical river engineering problems. .

== Early life ==
Forrest M. Holly Jr. was the oldest of four children born to Jean Treadway (1918–2007) and Forrest M. Holly Sr. Both of his parents were blind, yet managed a successful construction company in Ramona, California.

== Education ==
Holly earned a B.S. in Civil Engineering from Stanford University in 1968, an M.S. in Civil Engineering from the University of Washington in 1969, and a PhD in Civil Engineering from Colorado State University in 1975 under the guidance of hydraulician Daryl B. Simons.

== Military service ==
After earning his M.S. in Civil Engineering in 1969, Forrest was drafted into the U.S. Army. He did not wish to become an officer, so was sent to boot camp as an enlisted soldier. After boot camp, he received orders to ship to Vietnam. Since he possessed a M.S. degree he was stationed at the U.S. Army Corps of Engineers, Waterways Experiment Station, in Vicksburg, Mississippi, where he assisted with hydraulic modeling.

== Career ==
- Sogreah (Société Grenobloise d'Etudes et d'Applications Hydrauliques). (1976–1981).
- University of Iowa, Iowa Institute of Hydraulic Research (1982–2003).
- Holly and Associates (2003-2017).

== Professional service ==
President of the International Association for Hydro-Environment Engineering and Research (IAHR) 1999–2003.

== Innovations ==
Together with Alexander Preissmann, Holly developed an accurate two-dimensional transport algorithm for open channel flow. This led to the so-called "Holly-Preissmann" scheme, was first published in Holly, F.M. Jr., and A. Preissmann, Accurate Calculation of Transport in Two Dimensions, J. Hydraul. Div. Am. Soc. Civ. Engrs., Vol. 103, No. HY11, Nov. 1977, pp. 1259-1277. This represented the first high-order accuracy scheme for the implicit coupled solution of conservation of mass, energy, and momentum in open channels with dispersive transport of waterborne contaminants.. Holly's addition of transport capability to Preissmann's 4-point scheme for open channel flow modeling extended that code to simulate transport of suspended sediment or contaminants.

Holly contributed to the reference text on computational hydraulics, Cunge, J.A., F.M. Holly Jr., and A. Verwey, Practical Aspects of Computational River Hydraulics, Pitman Publishing Ltd., London, 1980

He was a co-editor of Chen, C.J., Chen, L.-D., and F.H. Holly Jr., Turbulence Measurements and Flow Modeling, Taylor & Francis, Nov. 1986, 900 pp.

== Professional recognition ==
- Arthur Thomas Ippen Award from the International Association of Hydraulic Research (1983), named after notable Hydraulician Arthur Thomas Ippen.
- Co-recipient of the Harold J. Schoemaker Award from the International Association of Hydraulic Research for the article "Two-phase Formulation of Suspended Sediment Transport,".
- Hunter Rouse Hydraulic Engineering Award, American Society of Civil Engineers, (2000) . This is a lifetime achievement award named after noted hydraulician Hunter Rouse.

== Personal life ==
In 1968 he married Joyce Nowry. Together they had one son, Lance. Forrest Holly died on May 22, 2017.
