= Hermann End =

German field hockey player

Personal information
- Nationality: German
- Born: 2 May 1942 Nuremberg, Germany
- Died: 9 May 2017 (aged 75) Nuremberg, Germany

Sport
- Sport: Field hockey

Hermann End (2 May 1942 – 9 May 2017) was a German field hockey player. He competed in the men's tournament at the 1968 Summer Olympics.
