= Judy Burton =

Judy Burton (July 11, 1947 – May 19, 2017) was an important figure within the educational community within Los Angeles. After graduating college at the University of California, Los Angeles, Burton entered the education sector as a teacher at Hyde Park Elementary School. Burton then went on to lead LEARN (Los Angeles Educational Alliance for Reform Now) as the new assistant superintendent of the program. In addition to her participation in LAUSD as a teacher and as an administrator, Burton helped develop one of the largest networks of charter schools in the Southern California Region, The Alliance College-Ready Public Schools, as its CEO.

== Early life ==
Judy Burton was born on July 11, 1947, in Fort Worth, Texas. Burton's father is Ardie Ivie, a railroad cook and her mother is Marble Halliburton Ivie. According to Judy's older brother, Ricky Ivie, their mother was their "family rock" and worked as a housekeeper in Beverly Hills, California in order to provide for her family. Despite facing institutionalized discrimination, Burton completed Washington High School and earned a major in Spanish and a minor in French from the University of California, Los Angeles.

== Career ==
Starting her career in 1971, Burton was hired as a teacher at Hyde Park Elementary School. Following Hyde Park, Burton went on to serve various administrative positions at Malabar, West Vernon, King, Morningside, and Hart Elementary school. She also served as the founding principal for the Los Angeles Unified School District's (LAUSD) Ten Schools Program, which restarted low-performing schools.

=== Los Angeles Unified School District ===
Judy Burton started off her career in 1971 as an LAUSD teacher at Hyde Park Elementary. Shortly after she began her career in education, she fulfilled many administrative positions at various low-performing elementary schools. By 1987, Burton was acting as the founding principal in the Ten Schools Program, a reformative project restarting underperforming schools with new faculty and resources. Additionally, at King Elementary, Judy Burton led a hiring committee, re-interviewing all employees and reassessing their effectiveness. In 1993, Burton lead "LEARN," the Los Angeles Education Alliance for Reform Now, a major reformation project initiated by then Superintendent Sid Thompson. After Burton's tenure as the assistant superintendent of LEARN in 2000, she was selected to serve as one of 11 local district superintendents. After Burton's time as a local superintendent, she was asked to lead a charter school network called Alliance College-Ready Public Schools. However, shortly after, Burton would be asked to come back to LAUSD as the chair of the Instructional Technology Initiative Committee in the wake of the LAUSD "iPads-for-all" venture.

=== Alliance College-Ready Public Schools ===
After Burton's successful tenure as one of LAUSD's local district superintendents, she was asked to head the Alliance College-Ready Public Schools, a network of charter schools. As their new CEO, Burton oversaw the construction of the first Alliance high school in 2004. Since then, due to Burton's leadership, the Alliance College-Ready Public Schools has been able to grow to 28 schools. Additional to the sheer size of the network, Alliance charter schools consistently outperforms other surrounding schools in high poverty areas. Judy's tenure as CEO came to a halt due to pressure from board members for new leadership and from teachers unionizing.

=== Miscellaneous ===
Burton was a contributor to U.S. News & World Report and HuffPost.

== Achievements ==
Judy Burton's success in the education sector is recognized by the following awards:

- 2010: The Harvard Southern California Club James E. Irvine Education Leadership Award
- 2011: The Superintendent of Distinction Award from Pepperdine University
- 2011: Honorary Doctorate of Education Degree from Claremont Graduate University
