= Michael Rank (author) =

British author

Michael Rank (1950 – 20 May 2017) was a British author. He was a journalist in China in the early 1980s, and visited Tibet in 1983.

== Education ==
Rank was educated at King Henry VIII School, Coventry, and graduated from Downing College, Cambridge, in 1972 with a degree in Oriental Studies (specifically Chinese). He also pursued studies at Peking University and Fudan University in Shanghai from 1974 to 1976.

== Career ==
Based in London, Rank was Reuters correspondent in Beijing. He visited the city of Rason in North Korea in 2010. He also published articles in The Guardian, "Asia Times Online", "BBC Wildlife", and 'North Korea Economy Watch'.

He later became a translator from Chinese to English and a freelance journalist. His interest in birds led him to study the life of Frank Ludlow and the history of English School of Gyantse. One of his articles on this subject was published by the Namgyal Institute of Tibetology.

He published three articles in the Royal Society for Asian Affairs.

== Articles ==
- 2014 "Nineteen Eighty-four in China", The Asia-Pacific Journal 9 June 2014.
- 2012 The Ponghwa behind Pyongyang's throne, "Asia Times Online", January 12, 2012.
- 2009 Ludlow, Frank (1885–1972), Oxford Dictionary of National Biography, Oxford University Press, May 2009
- 2004 King Arthur comes to Tibet: Frank Ludlow and the English school in Gyantse, 1923-26, Namgyal Bulletin of Tibetology, 2004
- 2003 Frank Ludlow and the English School in Tibet 1923-1926, Volume 34, number 1 Asian Affairs, Royal Society for Asian Affairs, 2003
- 2001 (with Axel Bräunlich) "Notes on the occurrence of the Corncrake (Crex crex) in Asia and in the Pacific region", In Schäffer, n.; Mammen, U (PDF). Proceedings International Workshop 1998 Corncrake. Hilpoltstein, Germany. 2001
