= Philip Szanto =

Philip Szanto (1935–2017) was a United States pathologist, associate professor at the Chicago Medical School at Rosalind Franklin University and co-author of a review book, BRS Pathology, which became a standard review text for American medical students.

Szanto's family fled Vienna from the Nazis in 1938 and settled in Chicago. Szanto attended the University of Chicago and then went on to earn his MD at the University of Basel Medical School, Switzerland. Szanto later died on the 26th of May, 2017, at the age of 81.

== Bibliography ==
- Schneider, Arthur; Szanto, Philip (2014). BRS Pathology (Fifth ed.). Philadelphia: Wolters Kluwer Health/Lippincott Williams & Wilkins. ISBN 9781451115871. OCLC 830683480.
