= Kiran Ashar =

Indian cricketer (1947–2017)

Personal information
- Born: 19 June 1947; Bombay, India
- Died: 27 May 2017 (aged 69); Mumbai, India
- Source: ESPNcricinfo, 27 May 2017

Kiran Ashar (19 June 1947 – 27 May 2017) was an Indian cricketer. He played seven first-class matches for Mumbai between 1968 and 1978.
