= Giampaolo Medda =

Italian field hockey player (1927–2017)

Personal information
- Nationality: Italian
- Born: 8 August 1927 Villasor, Italy
- Died: 3 May 2017 (aged 89) Cagliari, Italy

Sport
- Sport: Field hockey

Giampaolo Medda (8 August 1927 – 3 May 2017) was an Italian field hockey player. He competed at the 1952 Summer Olympics and the 1960 Summer Olympics.
