= Judith Stein (historian) =

American historian

Judith Susan Stein (April 17, 1940 – May 8, 2017) was an American historian, and a Distinguished Professor of History at the City College and Graduate Center of the City University of New York. She worked on African American history, social movements, labor and business history, and political economy. Her major works are World of Marcus Garvey: Race and Class in Modern Society, Running Steel, Running America: Race, Economy and the Decline of Liberalism, and Pivotal Decade: How the United States Traded Factories for Finance.

== Life ==
Judith Susan Stein was born in Brooklyn, New York, where her parents were a stockbroker and a schoolteacher, attended James Madison High School, and graduated with honors from Vassar College in 1960. She received a Ph.D. in American Studies from Yale University in 1968.

Stein died from lung cancer in Manhattan, New York, on May 8, 2017, at the age of 77.

== Works ==
Stein's first book The World of Marcus Garvey addressed a major African American leader and movement, as well as his era, the early twentieth century up until the Great Depression. Harvard historian Nathan Huggins, writing in the American Historical Review, said Stein, writing on a subject that is often "overly heated... has written the most balanced and the most historically textured study of Garvey and his times."

Her second book, Running Steel, Running America placed race in the context of economy. Business History called it "[A] marvelous and important book, an immaculately researched, powerfully written analysis." It "used the steel industry to chart the decline of liberalism" wrote the Law and History Review

Her third book, Pivotal Decade addresses the decade of the 1970s. Stein asked "Why did the nation replace the assumptions that capital and labor should prosper together with an ethic claiming that the promotion of capital will eventually benefit labor." "This book should be required reading for any- one seeking to understand how the economic re-structuring of the 1970s led to our current age of inequality," wrote reviewer Shane Hamilton, from the Department of History at the University of Georgia. In the final year of her life, she began working on a book about the 1990s and the triumph of neoliberalism. Entitled A Fabulous Failure: The Clinton Presidency and the Transformation of American Capitalism, the book was completed by Nelson Lichtenstein and published in 2023.

== Academic activities ==
Stein was on the editorial board of the journal International Labor and Working Class History. She was the recipient of fellowships from the National Endowment for the Humanities and the American Council of Learned Societies, and was awarded a CUNY Distinguished Fellowship in 2013. She was elected to the Society of American Historians and served as a Distinguished Lecturer for the Organization of American Historians. She taught in Russia in 2006 as the Nikolay V. Sivachev Distinguished Chair in American History at Moscow State University.

== Non-academic activities ==
Stein has written for the New York Times, Dissent, Village Voice, Nation, In These Times, the Philadelphia Inquirer and Logos: A Journal of Modern Society and Culture. She regularly blogged for Dissent. She regularly commented on contemporary events for news institutions, appearing on Bloomberg, BBC, and other television and radio programs.
