= Fozia Anjum =

Pashto-language poet, educationist, and radio broadcaster

- Born: Zeenat Anjum Khattak; 5 June 1939; Jehangira, District Swabi, British India
- Died: 2017 (aged 77–78); Chicago, United States
- Occupations: Radio broadcaster Poet

Zeenat Anjum Khattak (1939 – 2017), commonly known as Fozia Anjum, was a Pashto-language poet, educationist and radio broadcaster from Pakistan.

She died of brain tumour at her daughter’s residence in Chicago, the United States in May 2017.

== Book ==
She wrote Da Ranra Pa Lor.
