= Peng Shaoyi =

Chinese physical chemist

- Born: 9 November 1917; Wuhan, Hubei, Republic of China
- Died: 6 May 2017 (aged 99); Los Angeles, California, U.S.
- Education: Wuhan University
- Scientific career
- Fields: Physical chemistry

Peng Shaoyi (Chinese: 彭少逸; pinyin: Péng Shǎoyì; Wade–Giles: P'eng Shao-i; 9 November 1917 – 6 May 2017) was a Chinese physical chemist. Peng was elected as an academician of the Chinese Academy of Sciences (CAS) in 1980. He was a member of China Democratic League since 1956.

== Biography ==
Peng's ancestral home is Liyang of Southern Jiangsu, he was born on 9 November 1917 in Wuchang, Wuhan. Peng had never received formal education until he attended the provincial high school. At 17 he enrolled at Wuhan University. Following the relocation of the university, he arrived in Leshan, Sichuan where he graduated from in 1939. Then he was appointed a research assistant at a fuel factory of the Chongqing government. He departed for the U.S in 1947, began his abroad studying and researching. He returned to China in 1949. Peng worked at Dalian Institute of Chemical Physics, CAS and Institute of Coal Chemistry, CAS. He concentrated on the catalysts for petroleum refining and chromatography. He was also deemed a pioneer of Chinese chromatography. On the early morning of the 6 May 2017, Peng died of deteriorating health.
