= Lee Weissenborn =

American politician

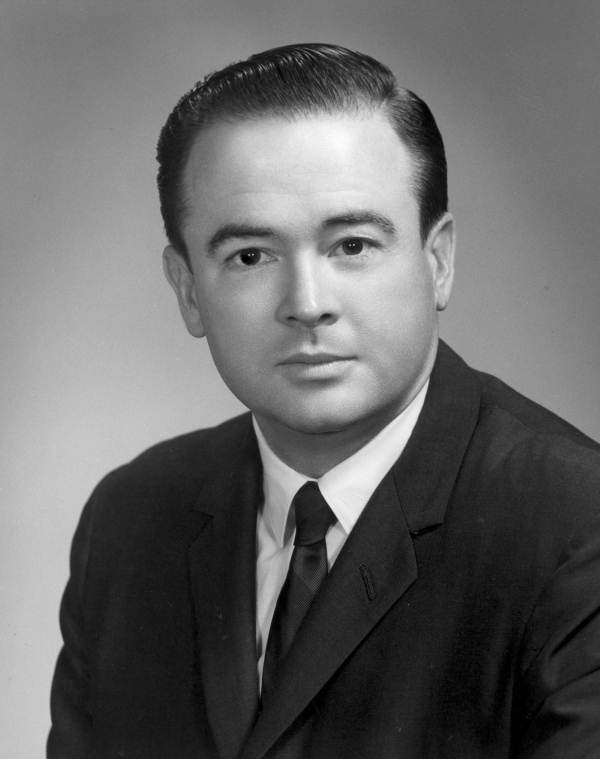

Member of the Florida House of Representatives for Dade County
- In office 1963–1966

Member of the Florida Senate from the 41st district
- In office 1967–1971

Personal details
- Born: March 19, 1929 St. Louis, Missouri
- Died: May 7, 2017 (aged 88) Palmetto Bay, Florida
- Party: Democratic
- Occupation: attorney

Lee Edward Weissenborn (March 19, 1929 – May 7, 2017) was an American politician in the state of Florida.

== Biography ==
Lee was born in Missouri and came to Florida in 1938. He attended the University of Florida and was an attorney. He also served in the United States Marine Corps. Weissenborn served in the Florida House of Representatives from 1963 to 1966, as a Democrat, representing Dade County. He was elected to the Florida Senate where he served as a distinguished member who was largely responsible for legislation to regulate and protect the migrant farm worker population in then highly agricultural Florida. Weissenborn ran for Congress in 1972 unsuccessfully. Senator Weissenborn is probably best known for his efforts to move the state Capitol from Tallahassee to Central Florida. Although his efforts failed, he is considered chiefly responsible for the construction of a new Florida Capitol building, which has a memorial plaque dedicated to him and acknowledging his role in it. He died in Palmetto Bay, Florida on May 7, 2017, at the age of 88.
