= Ramona Gardens =

Public housing development in Los Angeles

Coordinates: 34.05797°N 118.193804°W

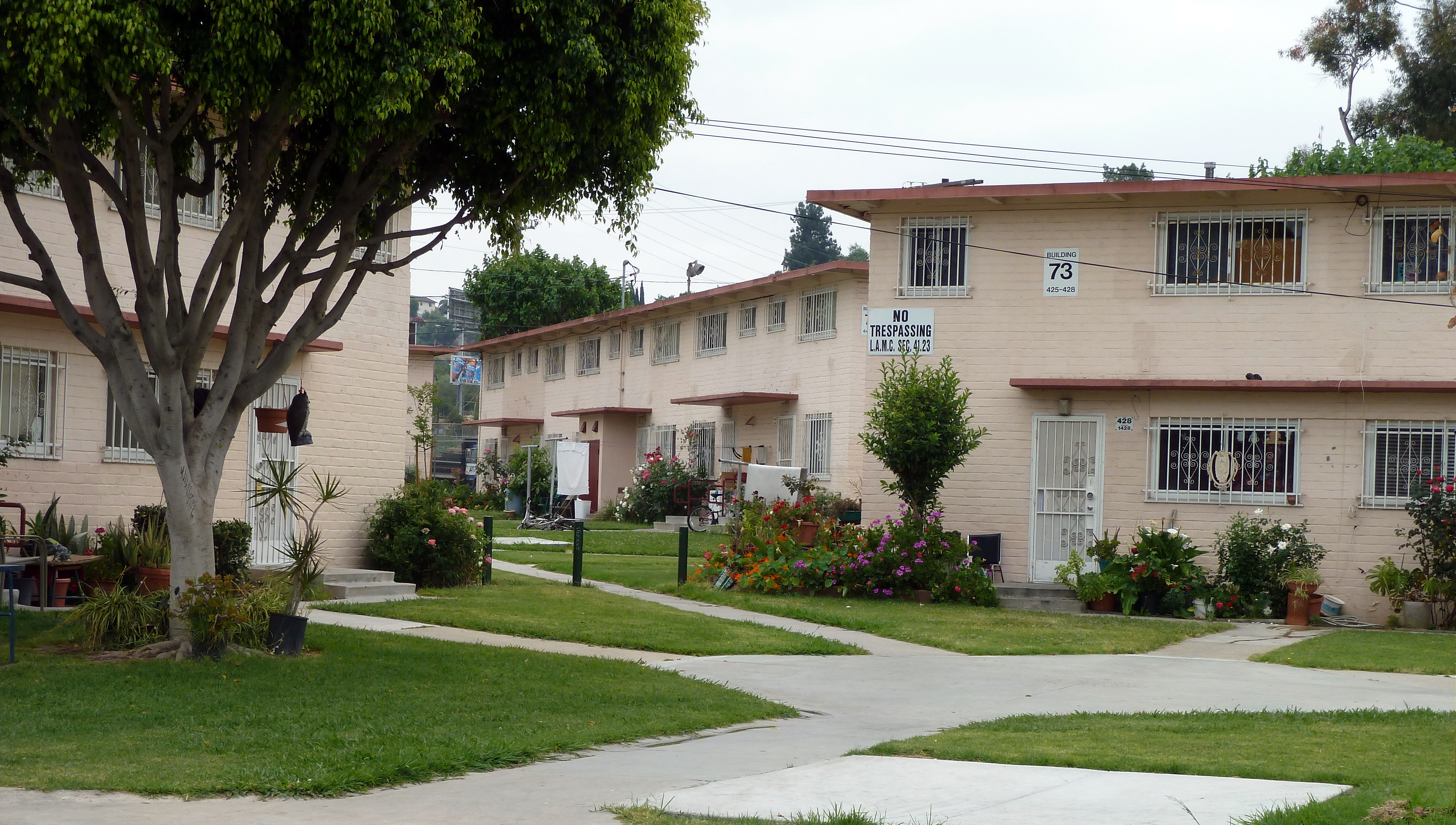
Buildings in Ramona Gardens

Ramona Gardens is a public housing development in the Boyle Heights neighborhood of Los Angeles, California. It is operated by the Housing Authority of the City of Los Angeles. Currently and historically Latino. In the past, it has also been associated with some residents being part of the Big Hazard street gang, which some argue have connections to the Mexican Mafia. Additionally, it has been an active location for illegal drug sales.

The development abuts the Interstate 10 and is part of LAPD's Hollenbeck Division.

== Initial construction ==
The Ramona Gardens project was designed by Housing Architects Associated, made up of Ralph Flewelling, George J. Adams, Lloyd Wright, Walter S. Davis, Lewis Eugene Weston, and Eugene Weston Jr. They had previously designed the Utah Street housing project under the name of Utah Street Architects Association and designed the Aliso Village project under the name Housing Group Architects. The landscaping was by the firm of Bashford and Barlow.

The project was originally named Ramona Village; it was changed in November 1939 because it conflicted with the name of a private land development. At the time, Ramona Gardens was billed a "slum clearance and low-rent housing project". Construction began in February or March 1940, with a groundbreaking ceremony on March 16, 1940, attended by Governor Culbert Olson.

It was built on 32 acres (13 ha) with 610 apartment units in over 100 buildings. The planned cost was $2 million, 90% funded by the United States Housing Authority through the Housing Act of 1937. It was built by the Herbert M. Baruch Corporation.

Demonstration units opened in October 1940, with the first six families occupying apartments on 2 January 1941. It was dedicated on 22 February 1941 with both Governor Olson and Mayor Fletcher Bowron in attendance. At that time, 252 of 610 units were occupied, with the remainder expected to be complete within two months. The Christian Science Monitor praised the "home conveniences that many of [the residents] never before enjoyed—electric refrigerators, new gas ranges, gas water heaters, and wall furnaces—at rentals ranging from $11 to $18 a month, including all utilities." Two hundred members of the American Institute of Architects (AIA) toured the development in May 1941, including architect and AIA President Richmond Shreve.

== Community efforts and further development ==
Jewish residents of Boyle Heights started the racially and economically integrated Heights Cooperative Nursery School for Ramona Gardens children in 1949. It was held at the Jewish Cultural Center nearby in City Terrace until Interstate 10 widening required it to be moved in about 1969. The nursery continued operating through at least 1974. It was used as a training school by education students at California State University, Los Angeles and by the Head Start Program.

In 1988, 10 mobile homes or trailers were brought into Ramona Gardens and parked on playfields. They were used as transitional housing for the city's large homeless population. Residents agreed to participate after receiving promises they would be given to families, not "the stereotypical single men who live on Skid Row."

After the initial number of 610 housing units in just over 100 buildings, varying numbers of units have been given: 488 units in 1985, 497 with about 2000 predominantly Latino residents in 2007.

The housing contains public murals that were created by the residents of Ramona Gardens between 1973 and 1977, with the assistance of the Mechicano Arts Center. Artists that painted these murals include Judithe Hernández, Carlos Almaraz, Willie Herrón, and Wayne Healy. These murals, along with the ones painted in Estrada Courts, are examples of public Chicano art in Los Angeles. In 2014, restoration of the murals began with Virgen of Guadalupe by Armando Cabrera.

The murals of Ramona Gardens are:

- Homenaje a las Mujeres de Aztlán by Judithe Hernández (1976-77)
- Adelita by Carlos Almaraz (1977)
- "Generations" by Unknown Artist
- The Ring of Fire: Circle of Death by Willie Herrón (1978)
- "Cauldron" by Unknown Artist
- "Mexican Flag" by Unknown Artist
- Cortez and Malinche by Pedro Pelayo (1982)
- Ghosts of the Barrio by Wayne Alaniz Healy (1974)
- Hazard Grande (En memoria de los homeboys y las homegirls) by members of the Hazard Grande gang
- "Pray for the Peace of the Barrios" by Unknown Artist
- "Jardin de Ramona" by Unknown Artist
- Memorial to Arturo "Smokey" Jimenez by Joe Rodriguez and Salomón Huerta (1992)
- "Zapata" by Unknown Artist
- To Ace Out a Homeboy by Manuel Cruz (1974)
- Virgen de Guadalupe by Armando Cabrera (1974)
- Road to the Cosmic Spirit by Ismael Cazarez (1974)
- "Pre-Columbian Deity in a Compass Rose" by Unknown Artist
- "Abstract Lowrider Flames" by Unknown Artist
- "Viva la Raza de Ramona Gardens" by Unknown Artist
- Adam y Eva by Willie Herrón (1978)
- My Life in the Projects by Willie Herrón (1973)
- Cultural Identity as Time in Perpetual Movement by Eloy Torrez (2002)
- Art Heals by Ricardo Estrada (2008)

In 1982, motivated by President Ronald Reagan, residents repainted every building in the complex in five months. They used tools and paint from the Housing Authority and sponsored by the East Los Angeles Community Development Project. The Big Hazard gang brought in rivals from Avenidas, Dogtown, and Garrity's to work on the project. Acknowledging the fresh paint and graffiti-free buildings, the Los Angeles Times named the area as the "center for drug traffic", remarking "users from as far away as San Diego drive to [Ramona Gardens] to buy drugs". PCP was heavily trafficked, but heroin and marijuana were also common. Both dealers and customers were often from outside of the projects but came to Ramona Gardens for the large and open marketplace, called a "24-hour drive-through drug market" by a police officer. Police were assigned on daily foot patrols and would often bring their first arrest to the station within 30 minutes of their shift. A tenants' association was formed, as well as a group called Mothers Against PCP and the federally funded Narcotics Prevention Project.

== Gang activity, drugs, police tension, and crime ==
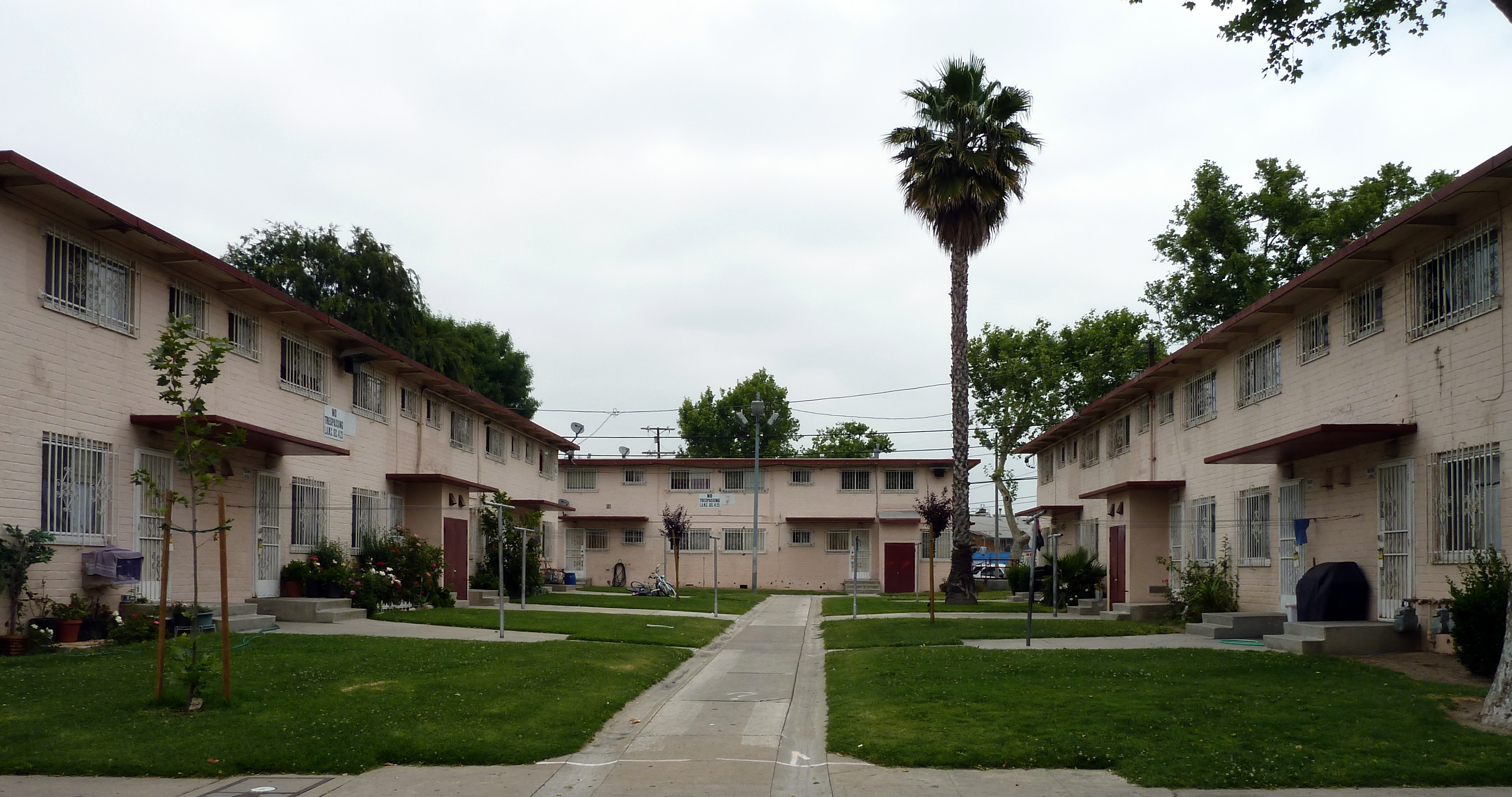
Buildings in Ramona Gardens

The housing project is especially known for a pattern of tension between residents, gang members, and police, as well as significant racial tension.

The street gang Big Hazard ("Hazard Grande"), associated with the Mexican Mafia, is from Ramona Gardens. Gang and drug activity historically centered around The Square, an intersection and parking lot in the project.

Gang-on-gang crime occurs in and near the park. Two teenagers were shot and stabbed to death while attending a baby shower in January 1974, less than a month after another gang-related shooting fatality.

An Alternative Education and Work Center (AEWC) opened at Ramona Gardens in December 1989, giving Big Hazard gang members a place to finish high school, since Lincoln High School is in rival gang territory.

In 1967, a 17-year-old "Mexican boy", a suspect to an arson that occurred minutes before, was shot and killed by police. The police showed in large numbers to mediate the tension. The Los Angeles Sentinel said the scene was "an ominous, uneasy silence, like a placid lid resting atop a seething volcano." Further saying that help was being provided to the blacks by the Symbionese Liberation Army, and that the sides "were at war", with only the "strong presence of police officers who live in daily and nightly fear of snipers." Nine days later, the officer was cleared by the coroner's jury as a justifiable shooting. In 1974, four teenagers shot and killed a Thai ice cream vendor in what was called a "thrill killing" while children were waiting for ice cream. In 1991, two black families were firebombed in a racially motivated incident.

In 1991, police shot and killed an unarmed gang member, leading to an FBI investigation and grand jury probe of the police department for it and three other police killings. A firefight between gang members and police in 1996 ended with one gang member dead, a police officer wounded, and an angry crowd. Gang members shot at patrol vehicles in 2006. In 2007, a gang member died while in LAPD custody. The 2007 incident erupted in a riot involving 50 gang members and 100 police equipped in riot control gear.

On May 15, 2014, a number of apartments in Ramona Gardens were firebombed with Molotov cocktails. There were no injuries. Most of the victims were African American.

== See also ==
- American Me
