= Katherine Bashford =

American landscape architect (1885–1953)

- Born: August 18, 1885; Prescott, Arizona Territory
- Died: June 3, 1953 (aged 67)

Katherine Emilie Bashford (1885–1953) was an American landscape architect who designed residential gardens primarily in Pasadena and landscaping for several Southern California public housing projects.

== Education ==
Katherine Bashford was born August 19, 1885, in Prescott, Arizona Territory. She was one of four children of Coles and Henrietta (Parker) Bashford. The Bashfords were a prominent political family: Katherine's great-uncle was Coles Bashford, one of the founders of the Republican Party. In 1894, the family moved to California, where Katherine would spend most of her adult life.

Bashford was educated at the Polytechnic High School in Pasadena and the Marlborough School for Girls, from which she graduated in 1905. She also studied at the Otis Art Institute in Los Angeles, but as a designer she was to a large extent self-taught. Her education in landscape architecture amounted to some time traveling around Europe viewing gardens just before World War I and again in 1924—especially Spain and Italy, which have climates similar to southern California—and a two-year apprenticeship with the California landscape architect Florence Yoch beginning in 1921.

== Landscape architecture career ==
=== Solo work ===
Bashford began designing flower gardens out of her home, on a small scale, in 1917. Following the professional training she received with Yoch, she opened her own office in Pasadena in 1923, specializing in gardens for private residences. She hired as office manager Hinda Teague Hill, an author and former schoolteacher, who helped Bashford promote her business by publishing articles on landscape design. She later hired a trained landscape architect with engineering skills, Beatrice M. Williams, to help work on the large gardens that were coming into vogue. In 1928, she moved her office to downtown Los Angeles, where it would remain for the rest of her career. Bashford's combination of artistic talent and business skill made her one of the most respected southern California landscape architects and kept her in demand throughout her 25-year career. Architects like Wallace Neff, H. Roy Kelley, Roland Coate, and Reginald D. Johnson, worked with her repeatedly.

Although Bashford's aesthetic as a landscape designer was influenced by European models, on the whole she leaned away from traditional landscaping—she disliked foundation plantings, for example—and towards a more informal style that emphasized simplicity and human scale. Her gardens made good use of native plants and those adapted to the southern California climate, and she was one of the handful of early-modern landscape designers who experimented with gardens as usable spaces and outdoor rooms. She was a proponent of massing flowers by color to create abstract compositions, and a number of her designs featured the flower-bordered walkways, patios, low tiled fountains and benches, fruit trees, and use of large potted plants as accents than are now staples of southern California residential landscaping. As a contemporary writer observed admiringly of her work, Bashford's "desire and aim has been to make gardens and home settings comply with the California spirit... she is first and last a real artist."

Bashford's clients included Mrs. Harry J. Bauer, Mrs. Harry Gray, John and Grayson Barber, Kenyon and Patricia Reynolds, Mr. and Mrs. Arthur K. Bourne, and William C. McDuffie. The last of these commissions won her one of the several awards she would receive from the American Institute of Architecture's southern California chapter. Other sites she worked on were the Bush House in Pasadena, the Gate House in Carpinteria, and the Sterry House in Los Angeles. She also created a walled garden featuring plants associated with California's Spanish missions for the restoration of El Molino Viejo in San Marino, a nineteenth-century building that started life as a water mill for Mission San Gabriel.

Bashford occasionally wrote on landscape architecture for the magazine California Southland. Her work was praised in Architectural Digest, California Arts & Architecture, and other magazines.

=== Bashford and Barlow ===
In 1930, landscape architect Fred Barlow, Jr. began working as her assistant and became her office manager in 1931 when Hill left the firm. The Great Depression put a large dent in Bashford's business, however, and in 1934 Barlow took a leave to do other work. In 1936, with business picking up, Bashford invited Barlow to become a partner in her firm, which was known thereafter as Bashford and Barlow.

Bashford and Barlow designed numerous residential gardens, as well as landscaping for Pepperdine College, a hotel, and a church. Barlow was a champion of public housing, and together they designed landscaping for the public housing projects Ramona Gardens (1940), Aliso Village (1942, now defunct), Rancho San Pedro, Harbor Hills in Lomita, Avalon Gardens, and Normont Terrace. Most of these were developed by the Los Angeles Housing Authority and/or the U.S. Housing Authority on very limited budgets.

A Los Angeles Times article on Aliso Village gives an idea of Bashford and Barlow's approach to landscaping for public housing:

"[The idea was to] restore much of the former beauty and some of the early California flavor it had when the tract flourished as a vineyard first planted by the Mission fathers. To the few pepper and eucalyptus trees that have withstood the test of time will be added such plants as the white oleander, California olive and walnut, Brazil pepper, live oaks, evergreen grape vines, various types of English ivy and crepe myrtle.”

== Later years ==
Bashford was elected a Fellow of the American Society of Landscape Architects (ASLA) in 1936. A year later, she and Barlow were involved in founding the southern California chapter of the ASLA. In 1938, she became the society's first woman chapter president.

In 1937, Bashford and Barlow's work was included in the San Francisco Museum of Art's "Contemporary Landscape Architecture and Its Sources," the first exhibition on this subject in a major U.S. museum.

Suffering from a heart condition, Bashford retired in 1943, turning over her practice to Barlow. She died on June 3, 1953.

== Legacy ==
Bashford's gardens are not well documented, and many of them have been changed, but those that remain testify to her mastery of landscape design. In 2013, the KenCott Manor garden Bashford designed for Kenyon and Patricia Reynolds in 1928 was under consideration for the National Register of Historic Places.

== Publications ==
- “A Course in the Appreciation of Architecture: The Relation of House to Garden,” California Southland 76 (April 1926): 28.
