= Daniel Ramos =

Daniel Ramos may refer to:

- Dan Ramos (1981–2023), American politician
- Daniel Ramos (graffiti artist) (born 1972), American graffiti artist
- Daniel Ramos (footballer) (born 1970), Portuguese footballer and manager
