= Pico/Aliso station =

Los Angeles Metro Rail station

Pico/Aliso
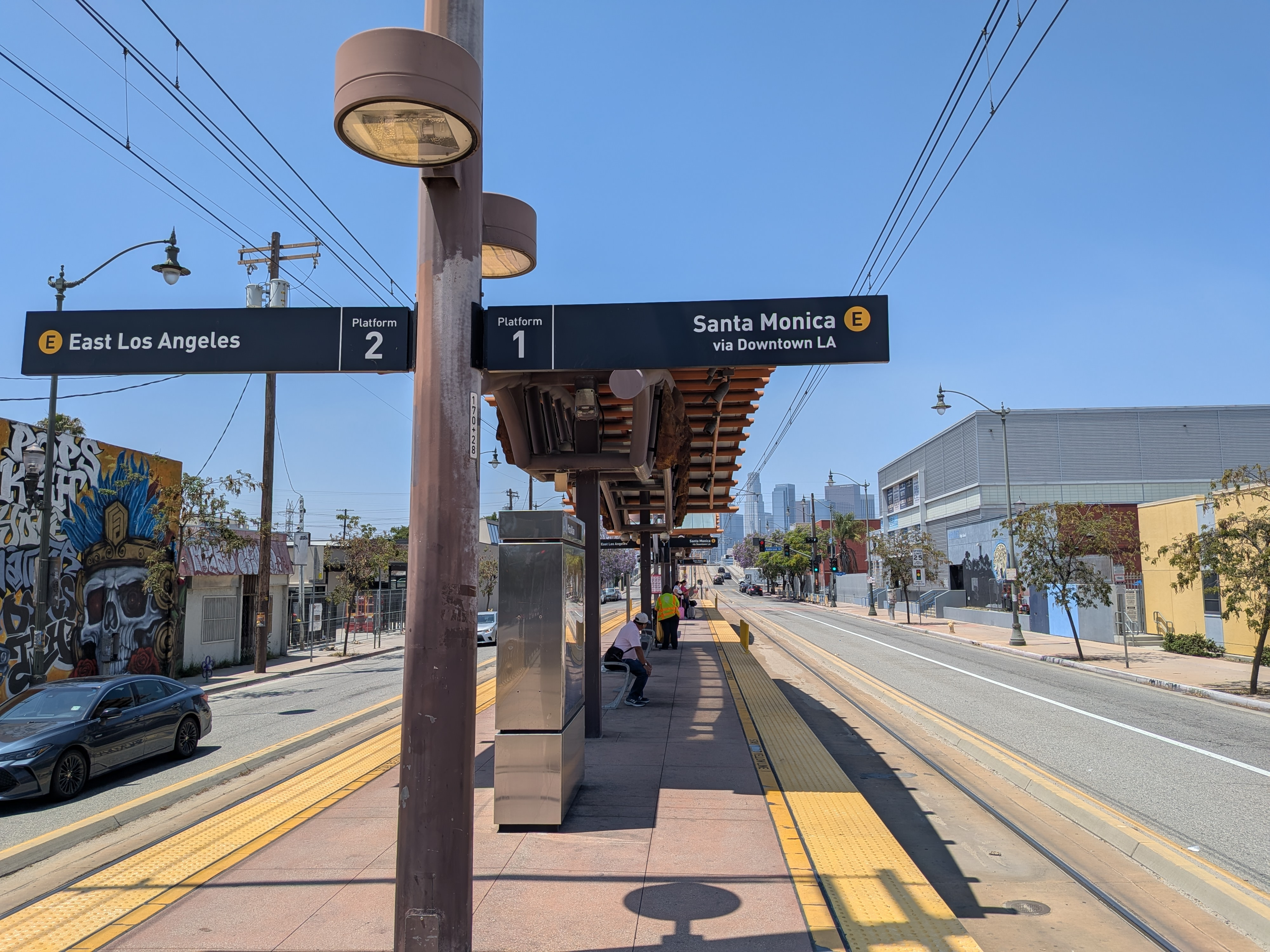
- Pico/Aliso station platform in 2026

General information
- Location: 1311 East 1st Street; Los Angeles, California
- Coordinates: 34.0478°N 118.2262°W
- Owner: Los Angeles County Metropolitan Transportation Authority
- Platforms: 1 island platform
- Tracks: 2
- Connections: Los Angeles Metro Bus

Construction
- Structure type: At-grade
- Cycle facilities: Racks and lockers
- Accessible: Yes

History
- Opened: November 15, 2009

Passengers
- FY 2025: 742 (avg. wkdy boardings)

Services
Preceding station	Metro Rail	Following station
Little Tokyo/Arts District toward Santa Monica	E Line	Mariachi Plaza toward East LA
Former services
Preceding station	Metro Rail	Following station
Mariachi Plaza toward East Los Angeles	L Line	Little Tokyo/Arts District (at-grade) toward Azusa
Location

Pico/Aliso station is an at-grade light rail station on the E Line of the Los Angeles Metro Rail system. It is located in the median of East 1st Street between South Anderson Street and South Utah Street in the Boyle Heights neighborhood of Los Angeles. This station opened on November 15, 2009, as part of the Gold Line Eastside Extension. It is near the former site of the Aliso Village housing project, and north of the Pico Gardens housing project.

== Location ==
Pico/Aliso station is located in the western part of the Boyle Heights neighborhood of eastern Los Angeles. The station is the first east of the Los Angeles River on the Gold Line Eastside Extension. Pico/Aliso lies in a low-density residential and industrial area. The Santa Ana Freeway, carrying US 101, acts as both a major transport artery in the area and the eastern border of the station precinct. The infamous Aliso Village housing project sat near the site of Pico/Aliso station but was demolished before the station opened.

=== Transit-oriented development ===
One of the aims of the Gold Line extension is to encourage transit-oriented development around Metro stations. At Pico/Aliso, the most prominent development is the Pueblo del Sol public housing project to the northeast of the station.

== Service ==
=== Hours and frequency ===
E Line service hours are from approximately 4:30 a.m. and 11:45 p.m daily. Trains operate every 8 minutes during peak hours, Monday to Friday. Trains run every 10 minutes, during midday on weekdays and weekends, from 9:00 a.m. to 7:00 p.m. Night and early morning service is approximately every 20 minutes every day.

=== Connections ===
As of December 15, 2024, the following connections are available:

- Los Angeles Metro Bus: 106

== Station art ==
Like many other Metro stations, Pico/Aliso station contains a piece of public art. LACMTA chose Long Beach, California based artist Rob Neilson to create a piece for the station, which eventually became "About Face."
