= Rancho San Pedro (disambiguation) =

Rancho San Pedro (Ranch of St. Peter) may refer to:

- Rancho San Pedro, historic land grant in Los Angeles County, California
- Rancho San Pedro, historic land grant in San Mateo County, California
- Rancho San Pedro, Santa Margarita y Las Gallinas, historic land grant in Marin County, California
- Rancho San Pedro, public housing project, Los Angeles County, California
