= George Phillips (American football) =

American football player (1921–1994)

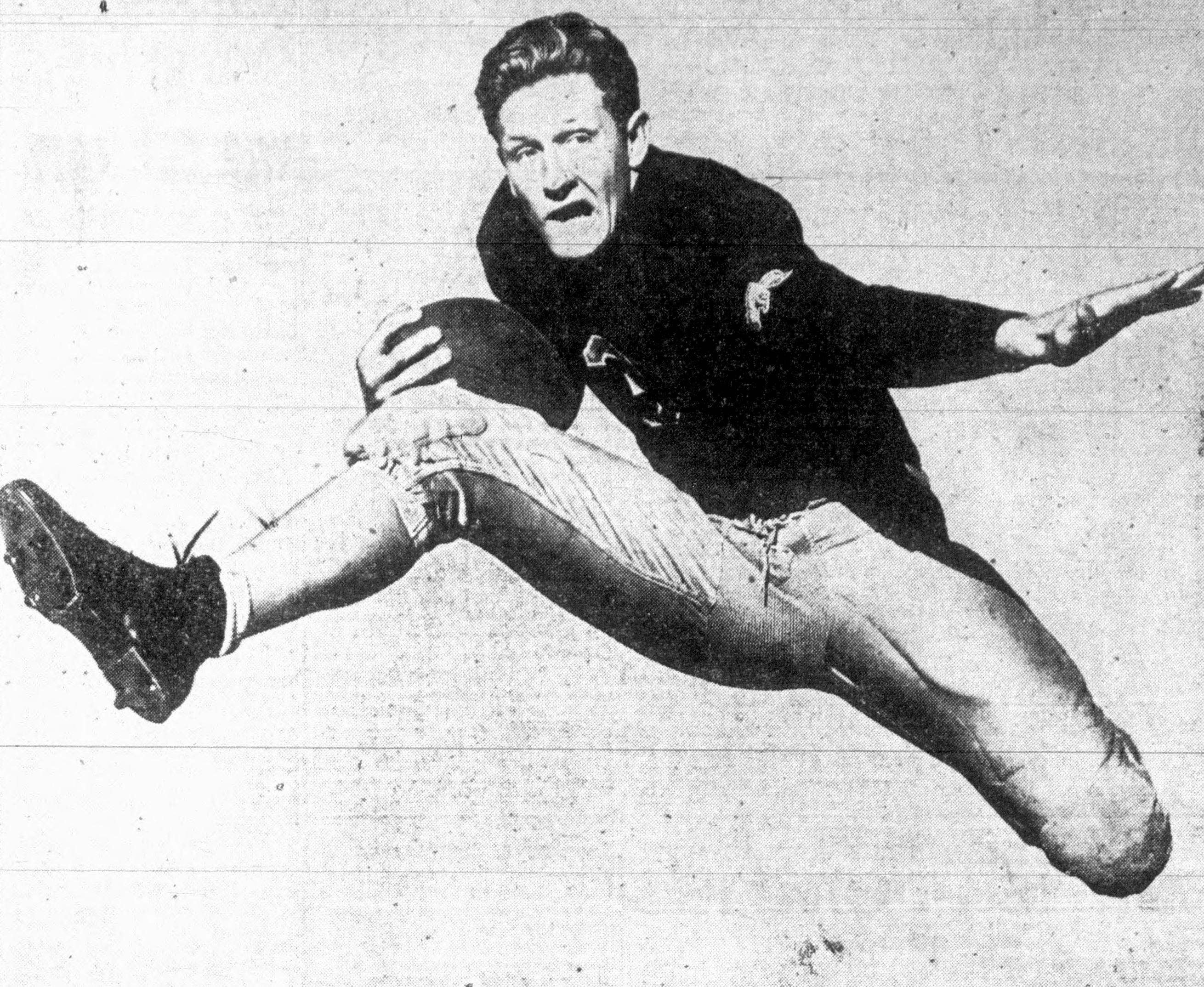
- Phillips, circa 1942

No. 18, 8, 6, 16
- Position: Back

Personal information
- Born: August 14, 1921; Shasta County, California, U.S.
- Died: December 11, 1994 (aged 73); San Luis Obispo County, California, U.S.
- Listed height: 6 ft 3 in (1.91 m)
- Listed weight: 215 lb (98 kg)

Career information
- High school: Fremont (Los Angeles)
- College: UCLA (1941–1942, 1944)
- NFL draft: 1944: 8th round, 74th overall pick

Career history
- Los Angeles Mustangs (1944); Philadelphia Eagles (1945)*; Cleveland Rams (1945); Los Angeles Dons (1946)*; Los Angeles Bulldogs (1946)
- * Offseason or practice squad member only
- Stats at Pro Football Reference

George Cannady Phillips (August 14, 1921 – December 11, 1994) was an American professional football player who played one season with the Cleveland Rams of the National Football League (NFL). He was selected by the Philadelphia Eagles in the eighth round of the 1944 NFL draft. He played college football at the University of California, Los Angeles.

== Early life and college ==
George Cannady Phillips was born on August 14, 1921, in Shasta County, California. He attended John C. Fremont High School in Los Angeles.

He lettered for the UCLA Bruins in 1941, 1942, and 1944.

== Professional career ==
In April 1944, he was selected by the Philadelphia Eagles in the eighth round, with the 74th overall pick, of the 1944 NFL draft but did not immediately sign with the team. He played for the Los Angeles Mustangs of the American Football League in 1944. He finally signed with the Eagles on July 24, 1945, but was later released.

Phillips then signed with the Cleveland Rams of the NFL and played in one game for them before being released on October 19, 1945.

Phillips signed with the Los Angeles Dons of the All-America Football Conference in 1946 but was later released. He played for the Los Angeles Bulldogs of the Pacific Coast Professional Football League during the 1946 season, scoring six passing touchdowns and two rushing touchdowns. He also had a 41.7 yard punting average that season.

== Personal life ==
Phillips died on December 11, 1994, in San Luis Obispo County, California.
