= Normont Terrace =

Public housing in Harbor City, Los Angeles (1942–1997)

General information
- Location: Harbor City, Los Angeles, California
- Status: 401 units

Construction
- Constructed: 1941-1942

Listing
- Demolished: 1997

Other information
- Governing body: Housing Authority of the City of Los Angeles

Normont Terrace was a 400-unit public housing project in the Harbor City neighborhood of Los Angeles, California. It was operated by the Housing Authority of the City of Los Angeles. The development was shut down and was completely razed in 1997. Norment Terrace has since been replaced by a mixed-income development and renamed Harbor Village in 1999.

== History and redevelopment ==
The housing development was originally built in 1942 and was located off Pacific Coast Highway and Vermont Avenue. It served as temporary housing for the military families and eventually became low-income housing. In the 1950s, it was occupied by whites, blacks and Hispanic families. By the early 1960s, majority of the whites moved out and it became predominately black and Latino with a small percentage of Asians living there. During the mid-1980s, crime in the project and surrounding areas began to increase with the rise in street gangs, drugs and violence. The project had become homebase for the two major street gangs, the Harbor City Crips (formed in the mid-1970s) and the Harbor City Rifas (also known as the Harbor City Boys, formed in the 1980s). Both gangs became allies and co-existed in the project until its closure. According to the Los Angeles Times, gunshots rang out frequently in Normont Terrace during the height of gang wars. In 1993 Housing Authority of the City of Los Angeles decided to demolish and redevelop the project into 800 condominiums, 400 of which will be leased to the current, low-income residents. The demolition began in 1996 and was complete in 1997. In 1999 Harbor Village opened on the former site of Normont Terrace.
