= John C. Fremont High School =

Public secondary school in Los Angeles, California, United States

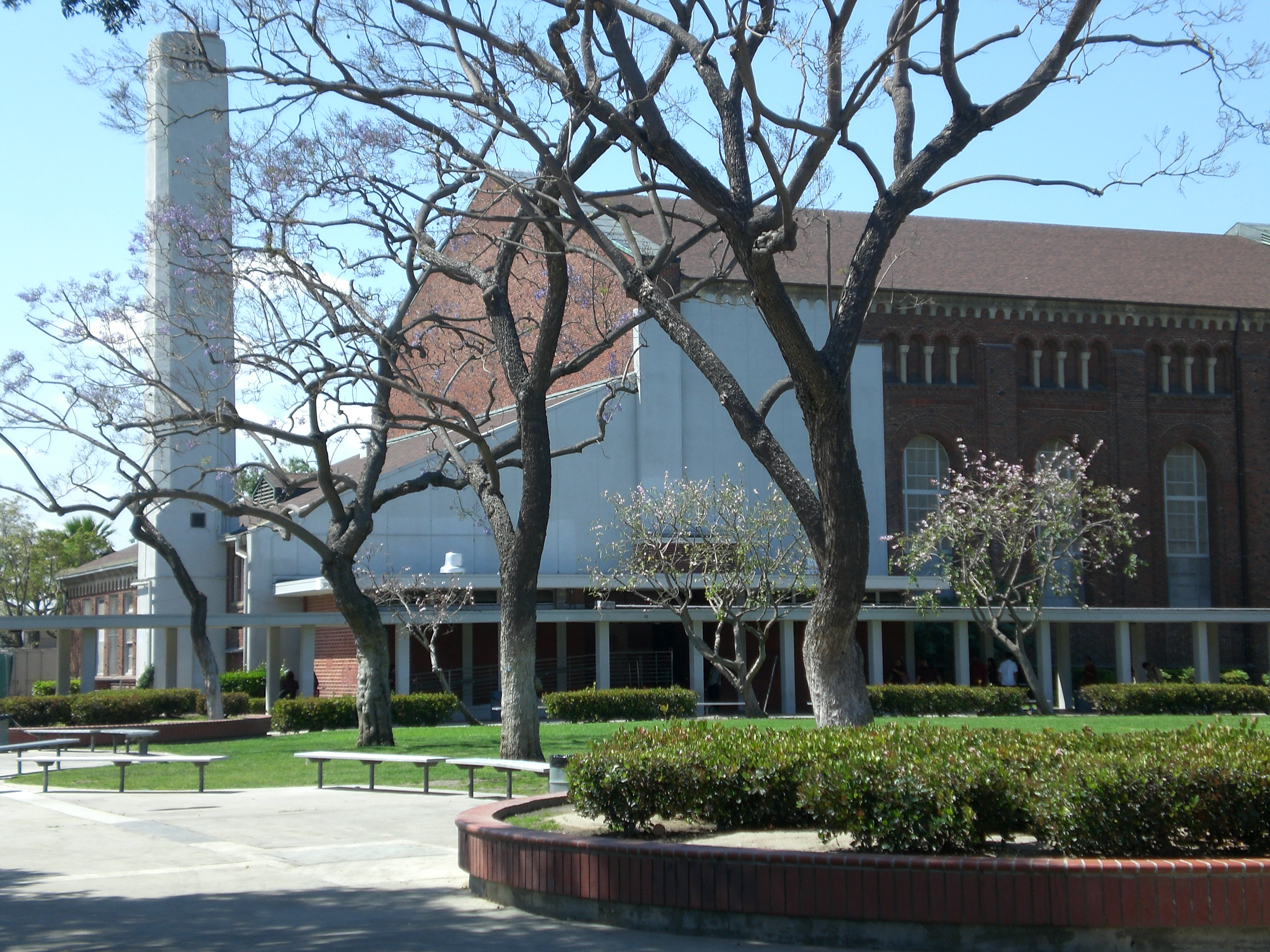
- John C. Fremont High School

Location
- 7676 South San Pedro Street; Los Angeles, California, 90003, United States; 33°58′10.7″N 118°16′4.1″W

Information
- Type: Public
- Motto: Find a path, or make one!
- Established: 1924
- Locale: City, Large
- School district: Los Angeles Unified School District
- NCES District ID: 0622710
- NCES School ID: 062271003023
- Principal: Damu Mike
- Faculty: 211
- Teaching staff: 99.25 (on an FTE basis)
- Grades: 9–12
- Enrollment: 1,889 (2024–2025)
- Student to teacher ratio: 19.03
- Colors: Burgundy; Gray
- Nickname: The Mont
- Team name: Pathfinders
- Newspaper: The Pathfinder
- Website: www.fremonths.org

John C. Fremont High School is a Title 1 co-educational public high school in South Los Angeles, California, United States.

Fremont serves several Los Angeles neighborhoods and the unincorporated community of Florence-Graham; some sections of Florence-Graham are jointly zoned to Fremont and David Starr Jordan High School. The Avalon Gardens public housing complex is zoned to Fremont.

The school first opened in 1924 and is named after John C. Frémont. The school is in LAUSD's District 7 and runs on a traditional school system. There are 1,980 students enrolled (as of the 2018–19 school year) with 11% of the student body African-American and 89% Latino. The name of the school newspaper is "The Pathfinder".

== History ==
Fremont first opened in 1924. Known in the community for its striking architecture and large quad with a working water fountain in the middle, the San Fernando Earthquake of 1971 forced many buildings on campus to be torn down and rebuilt in a more traditional, earthquake-safe style. Once enrolled with more than 5,000 students in the early 2000s, Fremont reduced its number of students when South Region High School 2 opened in 2011.

== Small school learning communities ==
John C. Fremont High School was one of the first schools in the United States to have been divided into a "small school" or "academy". The purpose of the small school is to allow personalization of instruction, due to the concern that students may become academically lost in a large, or augmented, campus. Each of the thirteen Small Learning Communities (SLCs), averaging 400 students each, is given a section of the school campus, and most of the classes take place in that section. For example, one of the small schools might be assigned classes on the first and second floors of the main building. The students of this small school would have the majority of classes in those two floors.

As of July 6, 2000, when the school undergoes reconstitution, the thirteen SLCs will be dissolved and in their place will be six Academies of 500 students each on the three Tracks, consisting of grades 10, 11, and 12. The 9th graders on each Track will have their own Center, with 600 students each.

In September 2003 only four SLCs remained, and the school switched over to a block schedule system instead of the track system. With the reduction of students due to the construction of the South Region schools, the school felt it would be able accommodate the students more efficiently with a block schedule.

There now exists only three SLCs which include, MESA, LSJ, and SGMA. All communities have students of all grade levels. There was once a 9th Grade Academy, a fourth SLC, but soon after the freshman class of 2016 did the school end that SLC.

=== MAGNET ===
MAGNET is considered to be the fourth current SLC, but the MAGNET community is a separate school in totality. John C. Fremont High School (school code: 8650) is the host campus for the John C. Fremont Magnet Math Science and Technology High School. (school code: 8651)

== Notable alumni ==
- Ricky Bell, National Football League player, College Football Hall of Famer
- Mel Bleeker (1920–1996), National Football League player
- Joe Caldwell, National Basketball Association player, Olympic gold medalist
- Ernie Case, UCLA quarterback
- Don Cherry, jazz musician
- Merl Combs, Major League Baseball player
- Clint Conatser, MLB
- Dick Conger, MLB pitcher
- Willie Crawford, MLB player
- Bernard Dafney, NFL offensive lineman
- Brock Davis, MLB player
- Edward Davis, police chief Los Angeles Police Department.
- Eric Davis, MLB player
- Joe Dawkins, NFL running back
- Bobby Doerr, MLB player, Hall of Famer
- Dr. Dre, music producer and recording artist
- David Fizdale, NBA general manager, Utah Jazz
- Dan Ford, MLB player
- David Fulcher, NFL player
- Al Grunwald, MLB player
- Kenneth Hahn, Los Angeles county supervisor and City Council member
- Doug Hansen, MLB player
- Dorothy Harrell, baseball player
- Candy Harris, MLB player
- Rickie Harris, NFL defensive back
- George Hendrick, MLB player
- Bernard Henry, NFL player
- Robert Johnson, NFL safety
- Nippy Jones, MLB player
- Chet Lemon, MLB player
- James Lofton, MLB player
- Tony Lorick (1941–2013), NFL player
- Gene Mauch, MLB player and manager
- Norm McBride, NFL defensive end
- Don McCall, NFL running back
- Leon McFadden, MLB player
- Catfish Metkovich, MLB player
- Ron Miller, USC and L.A. Rams end, president and CEO of Walt Disney Productions in the early 1980s
- Felicia O'Dell, YouTuber
- Gerry Perry, NFL defensive lineman and placekicker
- George Phillips, football player
- Leonard Pitts, Pulitzer Prize recipient, author, and Miami Herald columnist
- Shorty Rossi, star of reality TV show Pit Boss on Animal Planet 2010–2014
- Curtis Rowe, UCLA and NBA player
- Henry Schmidt, NFL defensive tackle
- Fred Small, NFL linebacker
- Richard Stebbins, 1964 Olympics gold medalist, track & field
- Bud Stewart, MLB player
- George Strock, Life photojournalist
- Dwight Taylor, MLB player
- Bobby Tolan, MLB player
- Raymond Washington, a founder of Crips
- Bob Watson, MLB player and executive
- Henry Waxman, California's 30th congressional district representative
