= North Hollywood Amelia Earhart Regional Library =

- U.S. National Register of Historic Places
- Los Angeles Historic-Cultural Monument
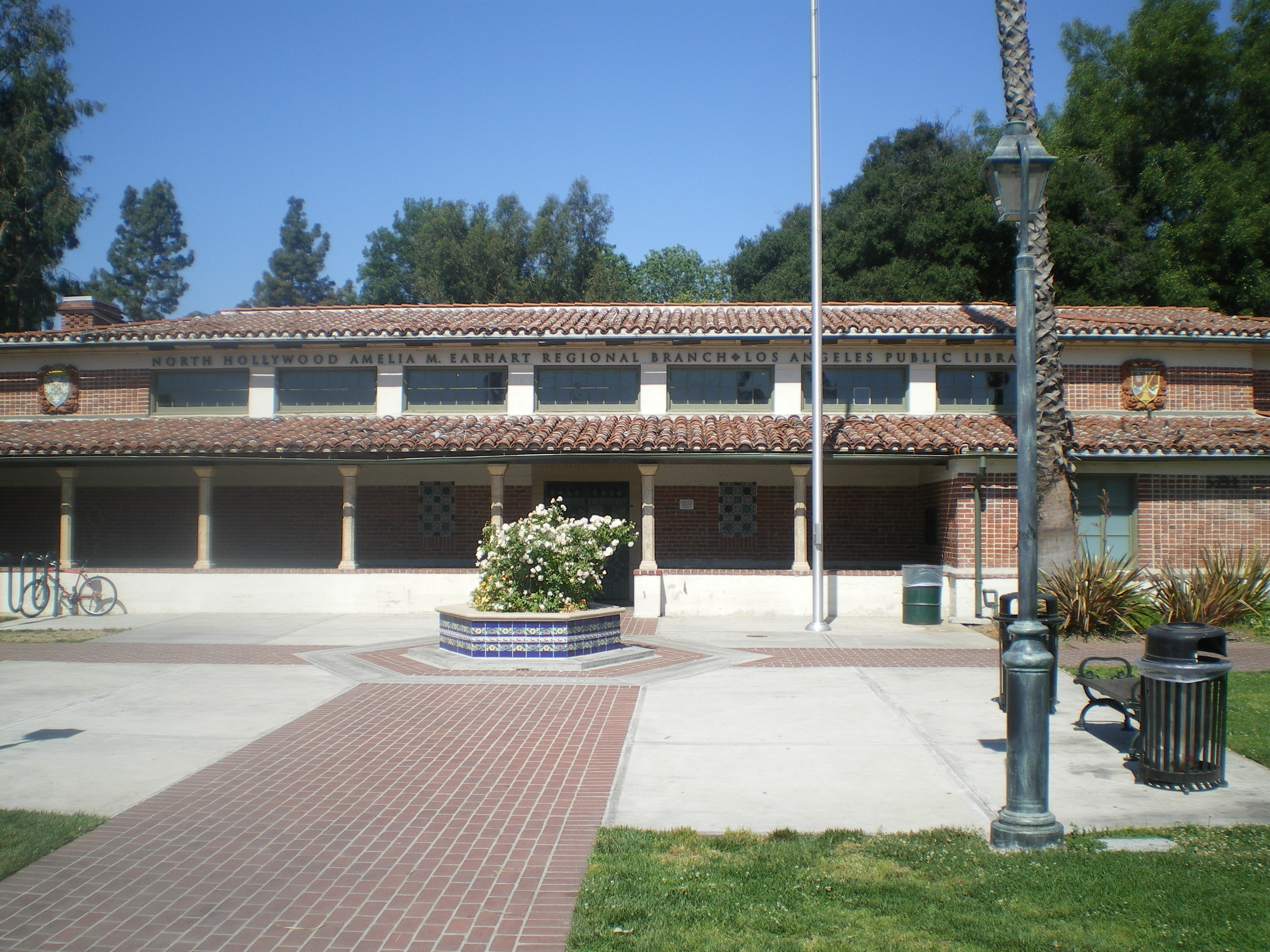
- The library in 2008

- Location within the Los Angeles metropolitan area
- Location: 5211 N. Tujunga Ave., North Hollywood, Los Angeles, California
- Coordinates: 34.1657°N 118.3794°W
- Area: 15,150 square feet (1,407 m^{2})
- Built: 1930, expanded in 1956 and 2002
- Architect: Weston & Weston (1930); John James Landon (1956)
- Architectural style: Spanish Colonial Revival
- Restored: 1994-1995, 2002
- Restored by: M2A architects ARK Construction
- MPS: Los Angeles Branch Library System
- NRHP reference No.: 87001018
- LAHCM No.: 302

Significant dates
- Added to NRHP: May 19, 1987
- Designated LAHCM: June 27, 1986

North Hollywood Amelia Earhart Regional Library, formerly Sidney Lanier Branch Library, also referred to as North Hollywood Branch and North Hollywood Library, is a regional branch library in the Los Angeles Public Library system, located at 5211 N. Tujunga Avenue in North Hollywood, Los Angeles, California. Opened in 1929, the building was declared a Los Angeles Cultural-Historic Monument in 1986 and was added to the National Register of Historic Places in 1987.

== History ==
=== Founding and expansion ===
The North Hollywood Amelia Earhart Regional Library began as two bookcases in the corner of a City of Lankershim post office. As it grew, it moved to a designated section in a feed store at the corner of Lankershim Boulevard and Margate Street, and then to its own building on Margate Street.

In 1923, Lankershim was annexed by the City of Los Angeles, and four years later, the neighborhood changed its name to North Hollywood. The library was also renamed the Sidney Lanier Branch, in keeping with the then tradition of naming Los Angeles branch libraries after literary figures. In 1927, the library moved to a larger location on Bakman Street, and it moved to its current location on July 29, 1929. This final building was designed by Weston & Weston, the architectural duo also responsible for American Legion Post 43. The budget for the building was approximately $25,000 ($468,750 in 2025).

The library's continued growth and designation as a regional branch for the San Fernando Valley necessitated an expansion. In 1956, architect John James Landon designed an addition that almost tripled its original size. The addition, which cost $183,000 ($2.17 million in 2025), was dedicated on June 22, 1956.

=== Renaming ===
In 1980, community members requested that the library be renamed to honor Amelia Earhart, who had lived in the area and frequently used the library. The name change was enacted the following year. A statue of Earhart also stands in the park adjacent to the library.

=== Repairs and restoration ===
The library was one of many structures damaged by the 1994 Northridge earthquake, with a majority of this building's repairs funded by MCA/Universal through the "Adopt-a-Branch" program. The library officially reopened on April 17, 1995, the last damaged branch to reopen.

By 2002, the library was once again in need of restoration and expansion. A new plaza, parking lot, and 1,400 square feet (130 m^{2}) of interior space were added to the building, increasing the facility to 15,150 square feet (1,407 m^{2}). M2A Architects and ARK Construction performed the restoration.

== Architecture and design ==
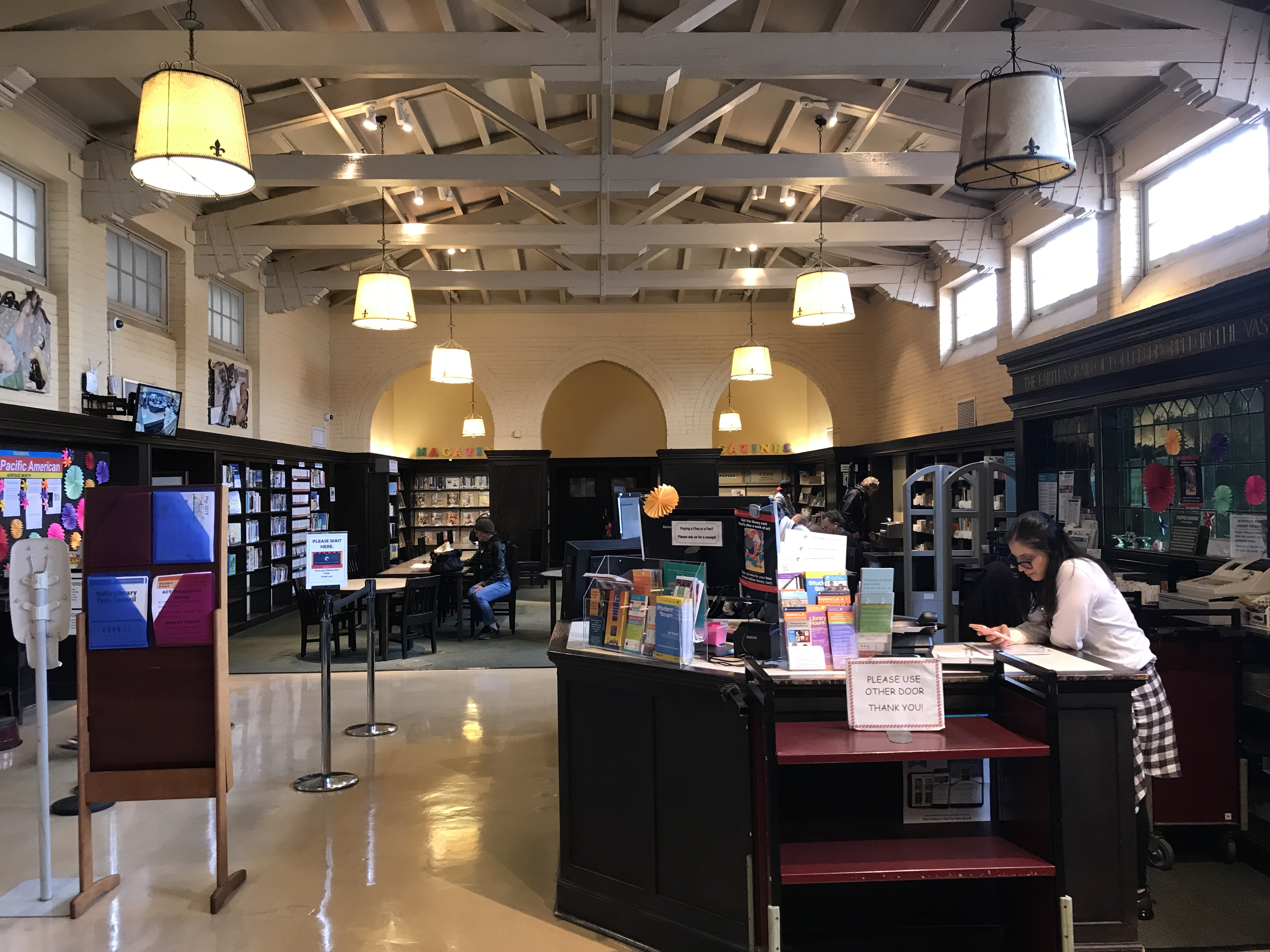
Library interior

North Hollywood Amelia Earhart Regional Library is a one-story Spanish Colonial Revival Mission-styled stucco and red brick building that features a Spanish tile double roof. The upper roof is shallow hip in design and hangs over a clerestory that contains seven multi-pane recessed windows flanked by two large and colorful terra cotta coat of arms, all centered over the entrance to the building.

The lower roof, located below the clerestory windows on the building's south and east sides, extends over offices and a porch that covers three-quarters of the front of the building. The lower roof is supported by a row of stylized concrete columns and capitals resting on a two foot high concrete wall finished by a brick course. The underside of the porch roof is finished with exposed rafters.

Entry to the building is through decorative wrought iron gates flanked by Mexican tile window grilles set with green antique glass, then a small rectangular vestibule. The building's interior features an open beam ceiling and a fireplace on the south end. Quotes from Sidney Lanier are located above the fireplace and charging desk.

The building's 1956 addition matches the original in brick work, roof, and exterior detailing.

== Historic designations and awards ==
This branch was designated Los Angeles Historic-Cultural Monument #302 in 1986, and in 1987, it and several other Los Angeles Public Library branches were added to the National Register of Historic Places as part of Los Angeles Branch Library System.

In 2003 and 2004, the library received State of California Governor's Design Award, the Los Angeles Conservancy Preservation Award, and the California Preservation Foundation Design Award, all for the restorations done in 2002.

== See also ==
- List of Registered Historic Places in Los Angeles
- List of Los Angeles Historic-Cultural Monuments in the San Fernando Valley
- Los Angeles Public Library
