= Housing Authority of the City of Los Angeles =

Housing authority in Los Angeles, California, United States

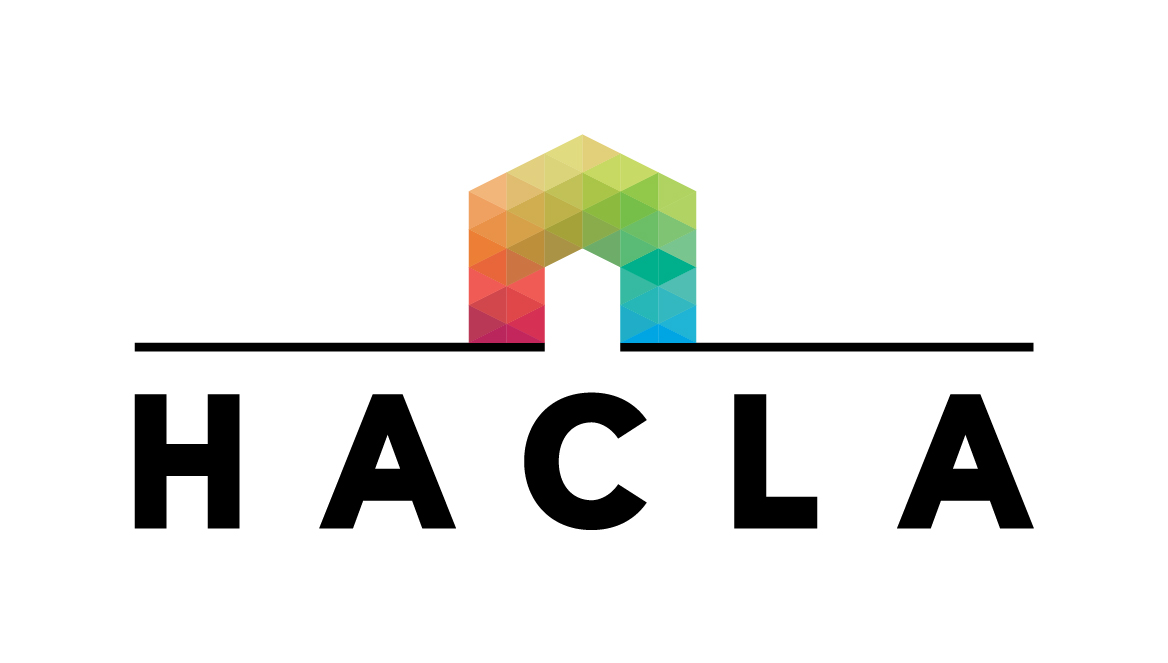

Agency overview
- Formed: 1938; 88 years ago
- Headquarters: Los Angeles, California
- Website: www.hacla.org

The Housing Authority of the City of Los Angeles (HACLA) is a state-chartered public agency. Established in 1938, HACLA provides the largest stock of affordable housing in the city Los Angeles, California, and is one of the nation's oldest public housing authorities.

HACLA funds come from five main sources: United States Department of Housing and Urban Development's annual operating subsidy, HUD's annual Capital Fund, Section 8 administrative fees, rent from public housing residents, and other program and capital grants from various sources.

In 1997, there were a total of 18 public housing communities in Los Angeles. As of 2025, there are only 13 Section 9 public housing communities left in LA.

== History ==
In July 1983, Mayor Tom Bradley disbanded the housing authority commission following allegations of mismanagement both by internal sources and by the Los Angeles Times. The City Council took control. After months of dispute, including former commissioners rallying housing project residents to support them, the new commission took control the following January with reduced powers.

== Housing locations ==
The larger location sites are:

- Avalon Gardens
- Estrada Courts
- Gonzaque Village
- Imperial Courts
- Jordan Downs
- Mar Vista Gardens
- Nickerson Gardens
- Pico/Aliso Gardens
- Pueblo Del Rio
- Ramona Gardens
- Rancho San Pedro
- Rose Hills Courts
- San Fernando Gardens
- William Mead Homes
- Dana Strand Village
- Pueblo del Sol
- Normont Terrace/Harbor Village

Nickerson Gardens is the largest family large public housing development in Los Angeles with 1,066 units.
