= Del Rey, Los Angeles =

Westside neighborhood

Del Rey
- Neighborhood of Los Angeles
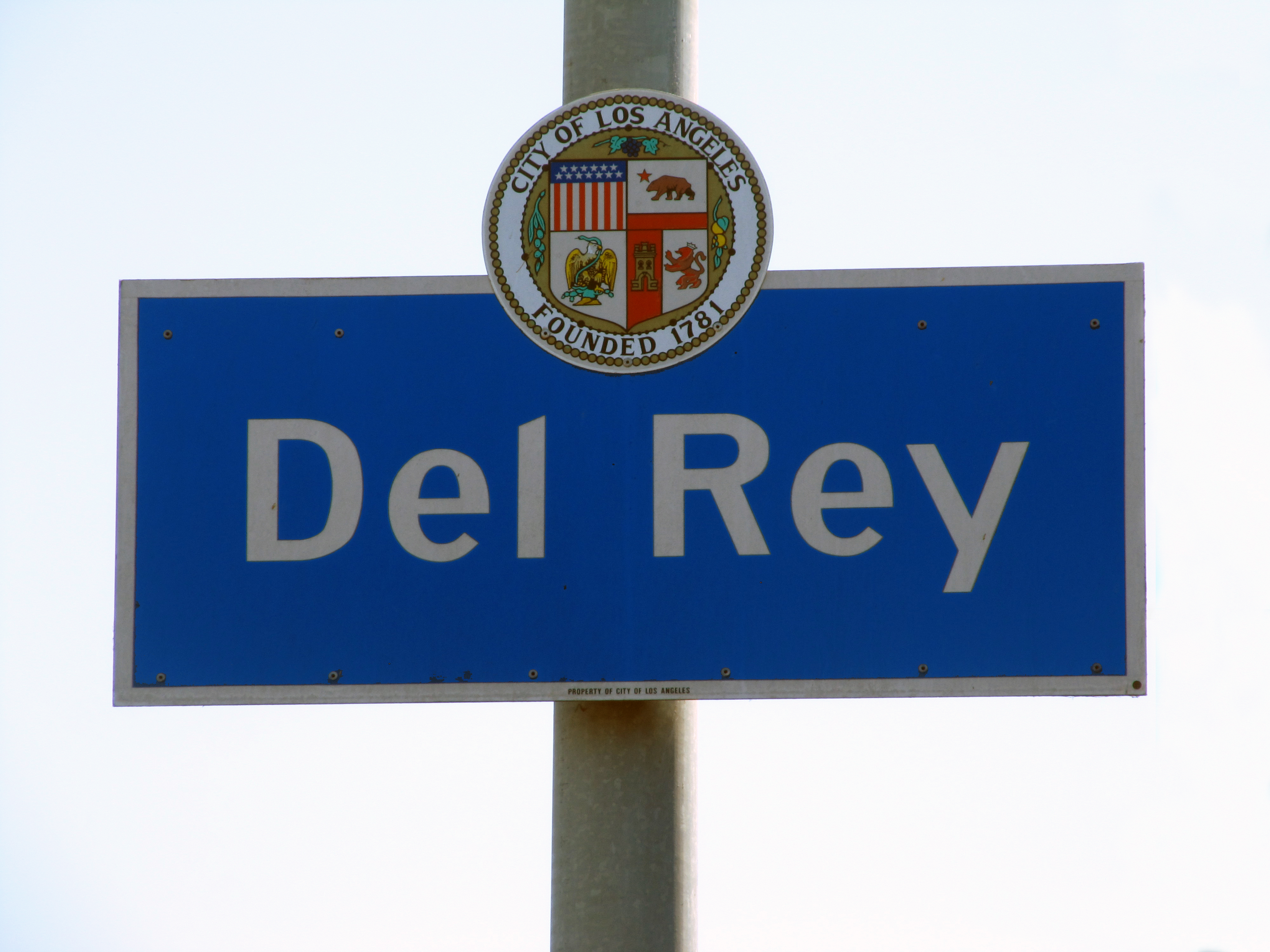
- Del Rey neighborhood sign at the intersection of Centinela Avenue & Washington Boulevard

- Location within Western Los Angeles
- Coordinates: 33.98943°N 118.42410°W
- Country: United States of America
- State: California
- County: Los Angeles
- Time zone: Pacific
- Zip Code: 90066, 90230, 90291
- Area code: 310

Del Rey (Spanish for "of the King") is a neighborhood in the Westside of Los Angeles, surrounded on three sides by Culver City, California. Within it lie a police station, the largest public housing complex on the Westside, a public middle school and six public elementary schools. It is served by a neighborhood council and a residents association.

== Geography ==
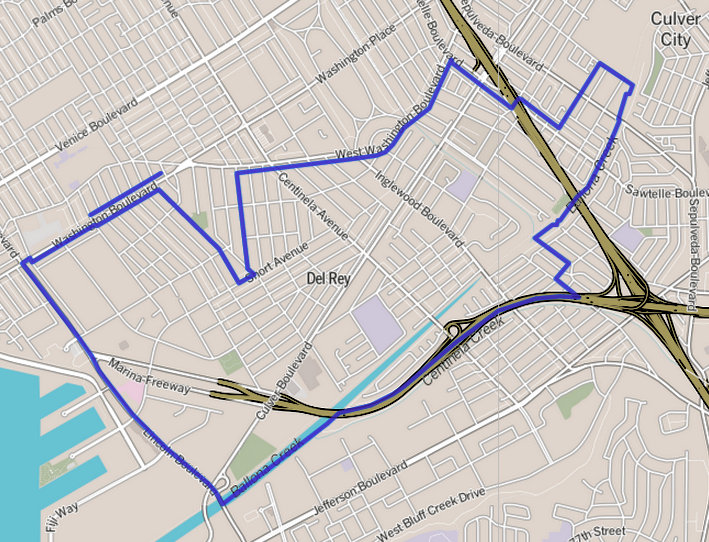
Del Rey boundaries as drawn by the Los Angeles Times

According to the Mapping L.A. project of the Los Angeles Times, Del Rey is surrounded on the northwest, north, northeast and east by Culver City, on the southeast by Playa Vista, on the southwest and west by Marina del Rey and on the northwest by Venice. Its southern bound touches the northeast corner of Playa del Rey and a small unincorporated residential area called Alsace.

Street and other boundaries are: the Culver City line on the northwest, and northeast, Ballona Creek and Centinela Creek on the southeast and Lincoln Boulevard on the southwest.

It is further divided into 8 census tracts that form the Del Rey Neighborhood Council's Areas A through H.

== History ==
The neighborhood was developed as a result of the Redondo Beach via Playa del Rey streetcar line that was established in 1902 from Culver City to the new beach resort of Playa del Rey.

Well into the 1950s, Del Rey was centered around market gardens. Summer celery was a successful crop.

The old streetcar/freight line was redeveloped into Culver Boulevard Median Bike Path in the 1990s.

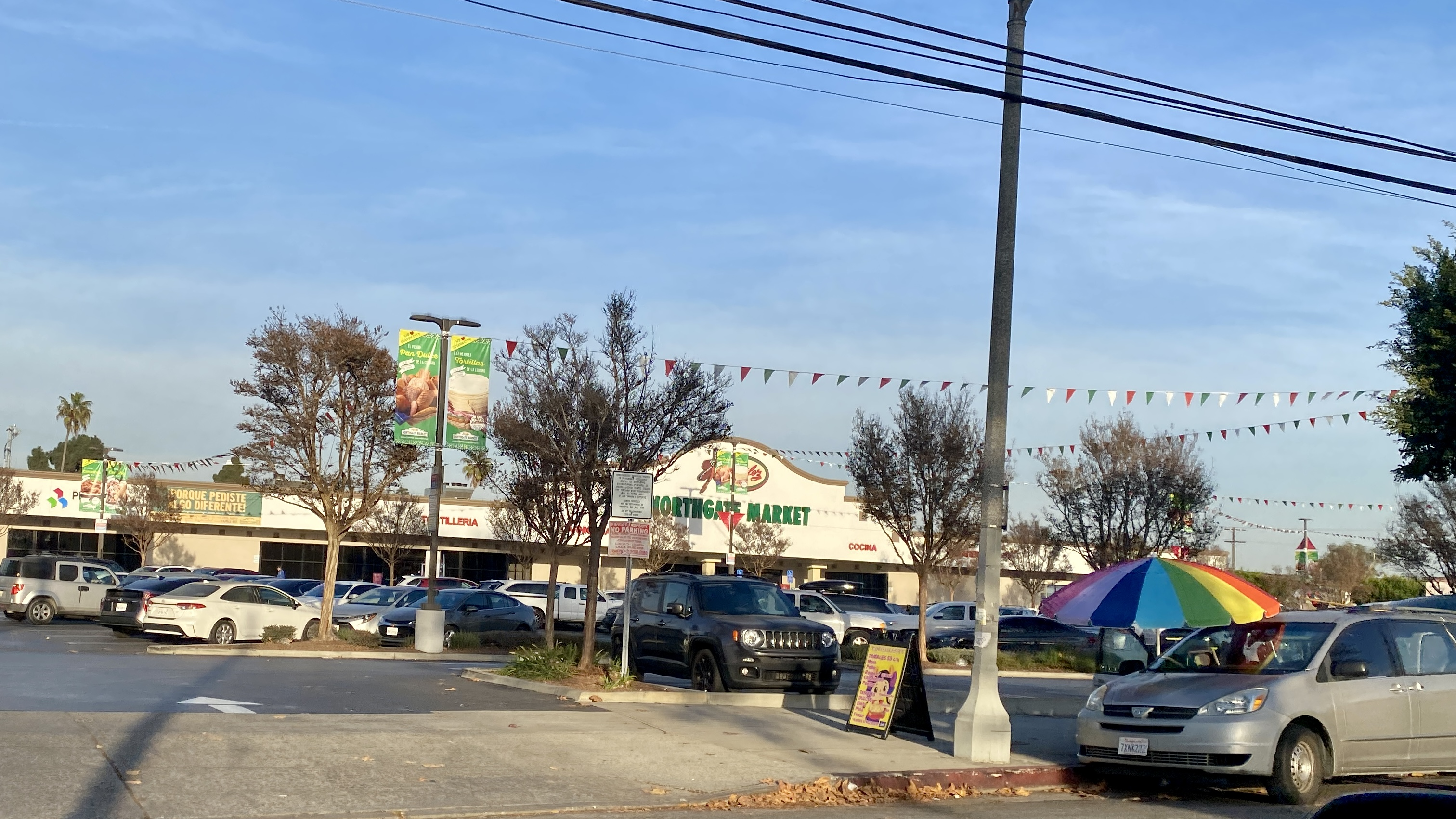
Northgate Market and food vendor with rainbow umbrella in Del Rey, Los Angeles

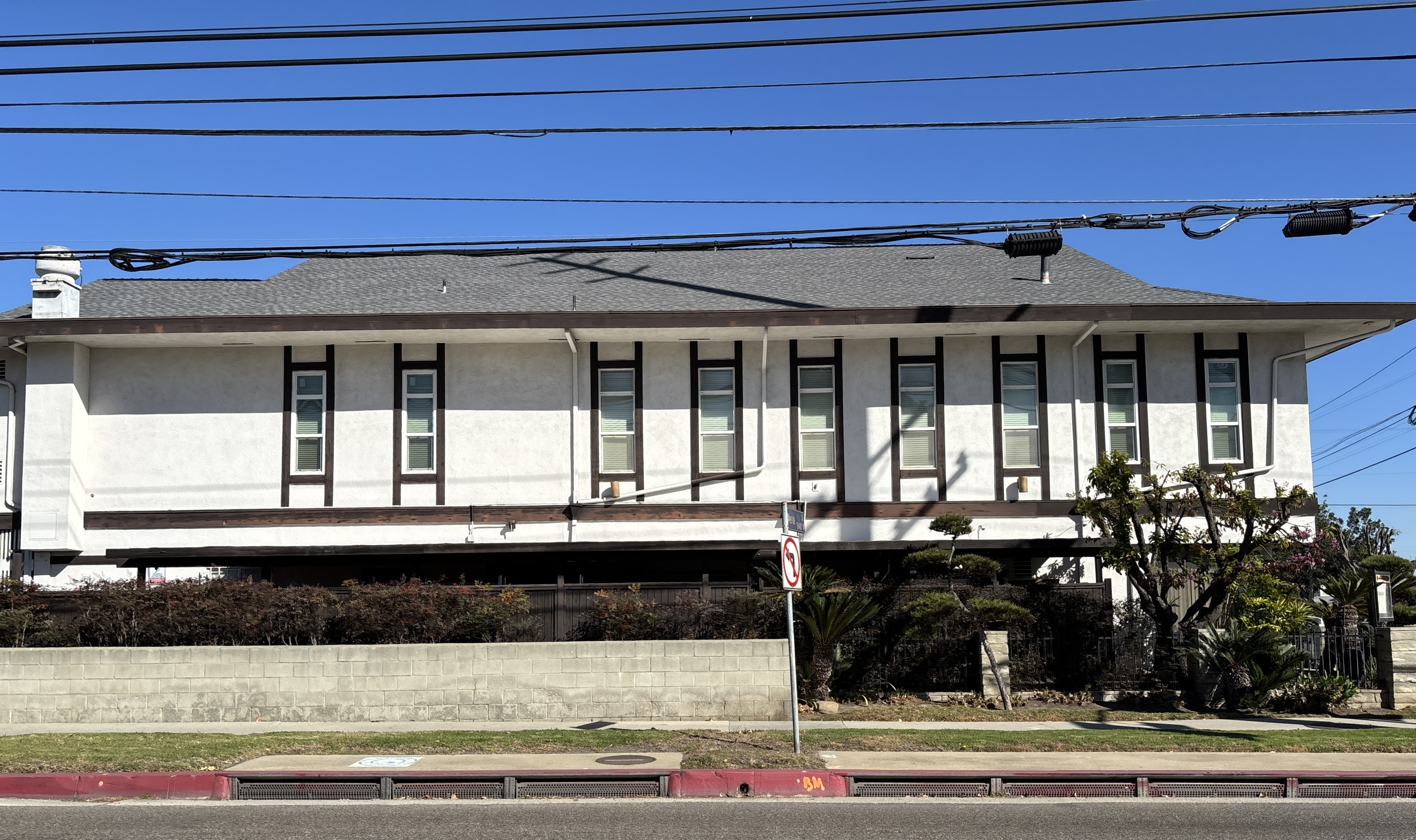
Venice Hongwanji Buddhist Temple

== Population ==
The 2020 U.S. Census counted 31,992 residents in the 2.7-square-mile Del Rey neighborhood—an average of 11,850 people per square mile, about the norm for Los Angeles; in 2010, the U.S. Census counted 31,070 residents; in the 2000 U.S. Census, the population was slightly lower at 28,010. The median age for residents was 38, considered the average for Los Angeles; the percentage of residents aged 20 through 34 was among the county's highest.

The neighborhood was highly diverse ethnically. The breakdown was as follows:

- Non-Hispanic whites, 41.3%
- Latinos, 32.1%
- Asians, 14.3%
- Blacks, 5.6%
- Two or more races, 5.5%
- Others, 1.2%

Mexico (53.3%) and the Philippines (7.0%) were the most common places of birth for the 37.9% of the residents who were born abroad—about an average figure for Los Angeles. Since its inception, the neighborhood has been home to large communities of Mexican-American and Japanese-American residents. This was noted in Federal Housing Administration Redlining plans in the 1930s, which gave the neighborhood a low rating due to the lack of enforced racial segregation. Many residents of Japanese descent were forced to leave as part of the Internment of Japanese Americans during World War II. A monument has been installed on the corner of Venice and Lincoln Boulevards in nearby Venice, where Japanese residents were ordered to board buses to the internment camps.

The median yearly household income in 2020 dollars was $110,065, above average for Los Angeles; while back in 2008, it was $62,259, an average figure for the city. The average household size of 3.1 people was slightly lower than the county, but in 2008, the average household size of 2.5 people was about the same as the city as a whole. Renters occupied about 70.7% of the housing stock (up significantly from 2008 at 55.2%) and house- or apartment-owners held 29.3%.

The percentages of never-married men (44.6%) and divorced women (12.2%) were among the county's highest. In 2000, there were 1,846 veterans, or 8.4%, a high rate for Los Angeles. By 2020, this number was estimated to have dropped to 805 to 1113, or 2.5% to 3.5%.

== Police service ==
The Los Angeles Police Department operates the Pacific Community Police Station at 12312 Culver Boulevard, 90066, serving the neighborhood as well as Westchester and Venice.

== Fire service ==
Del Rey is served by the Los Angeles Fire Department. Station 67 is located near Del Rey on Playa Vista Drive. Parts of Del Rey are also served by LAFD Station 63 (Venice) and Station 62 (Mar Vista).

== Education ==
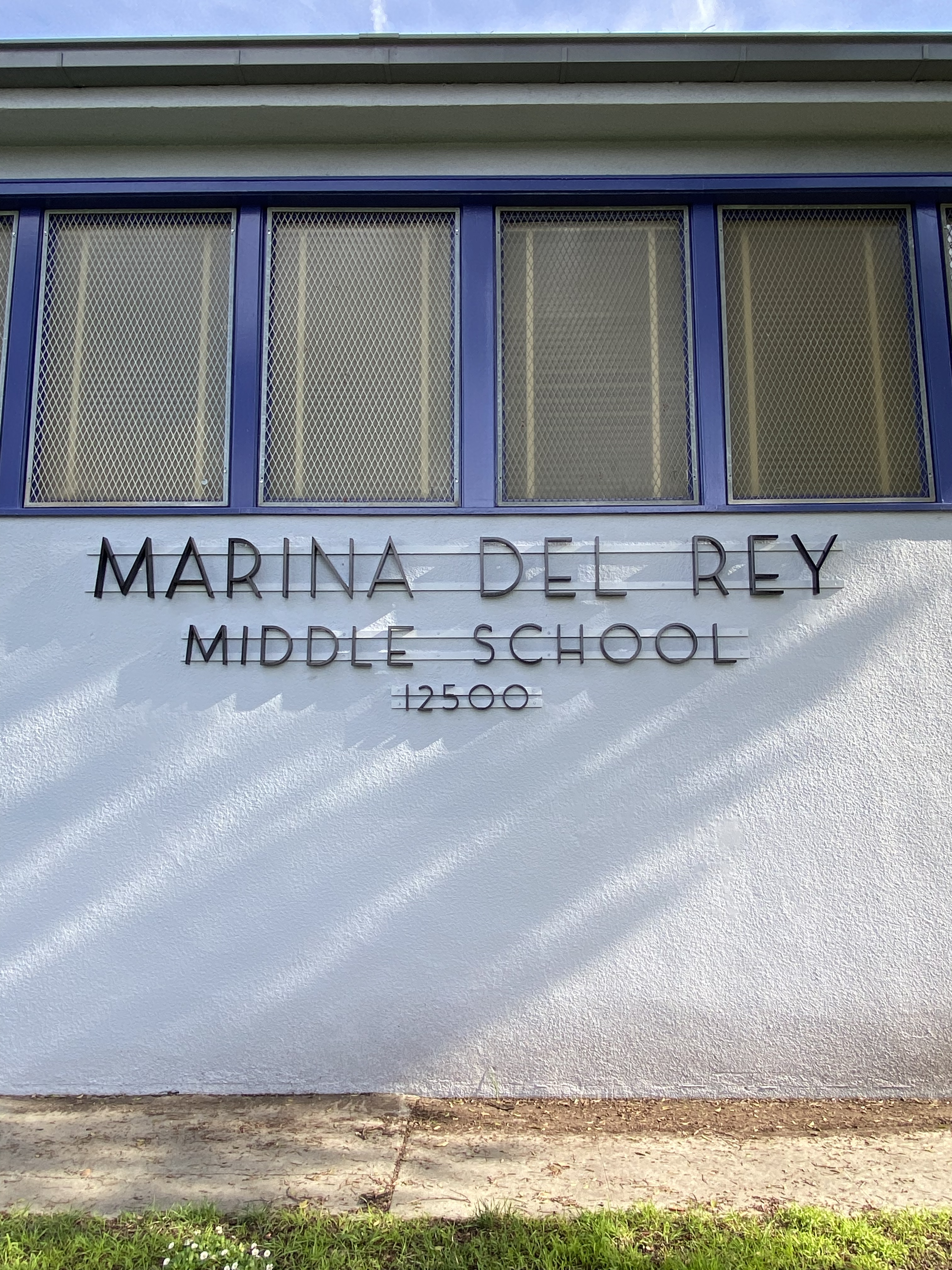
Marina del Rey Middle School

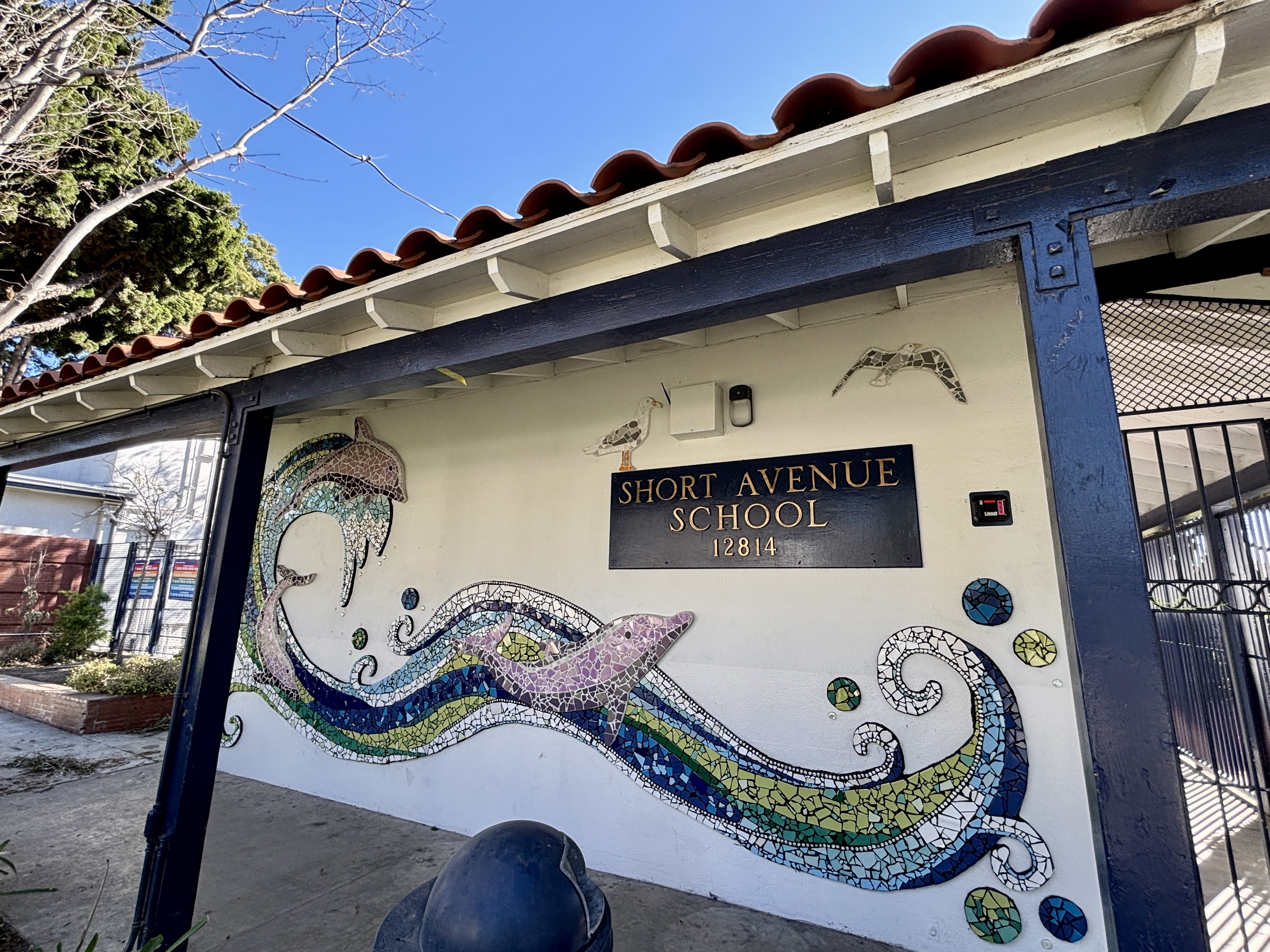
Short Avenue Elementary

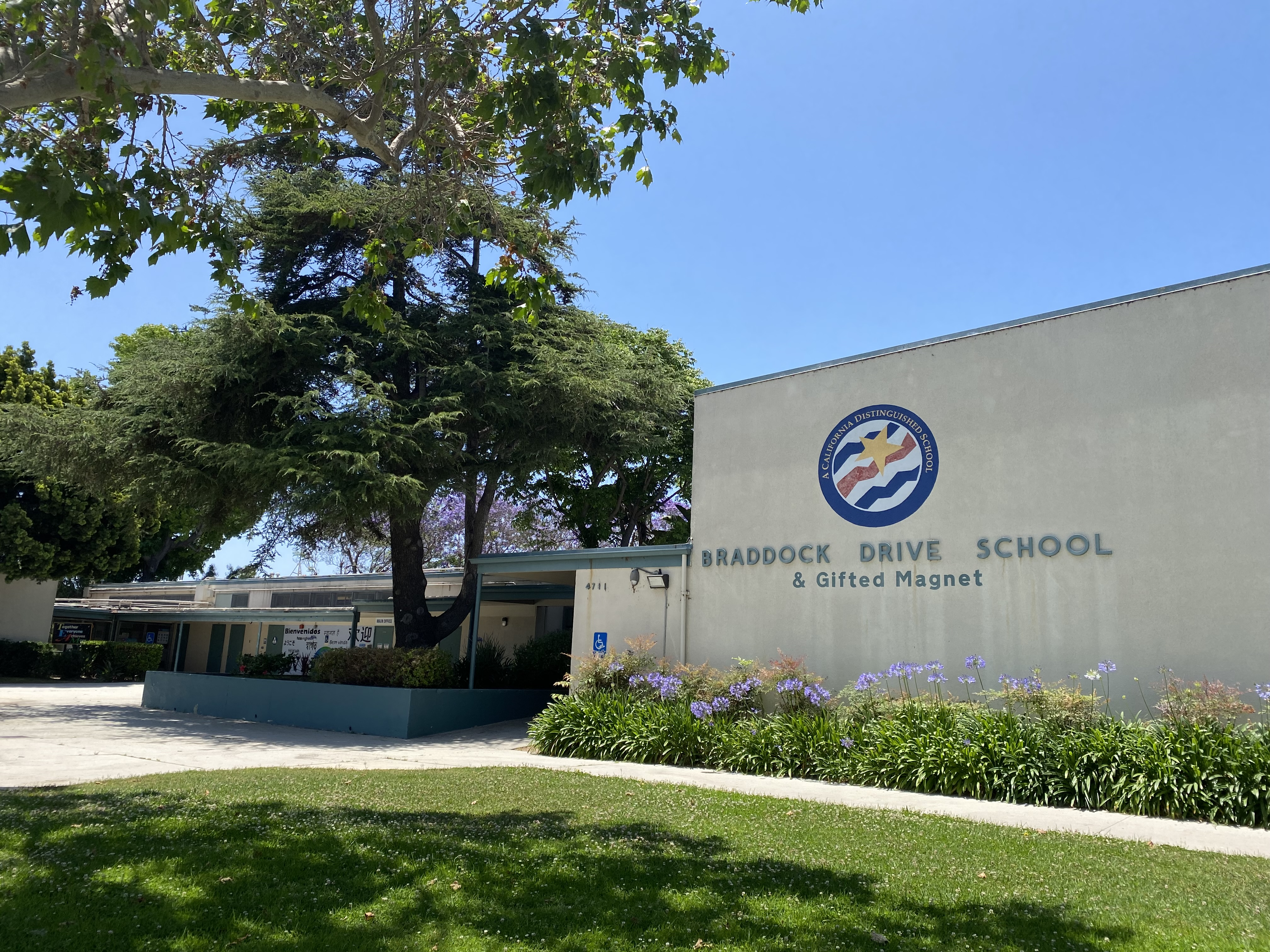
Braddock Drive Elementary School and Gifted Magnet (LAUSD)

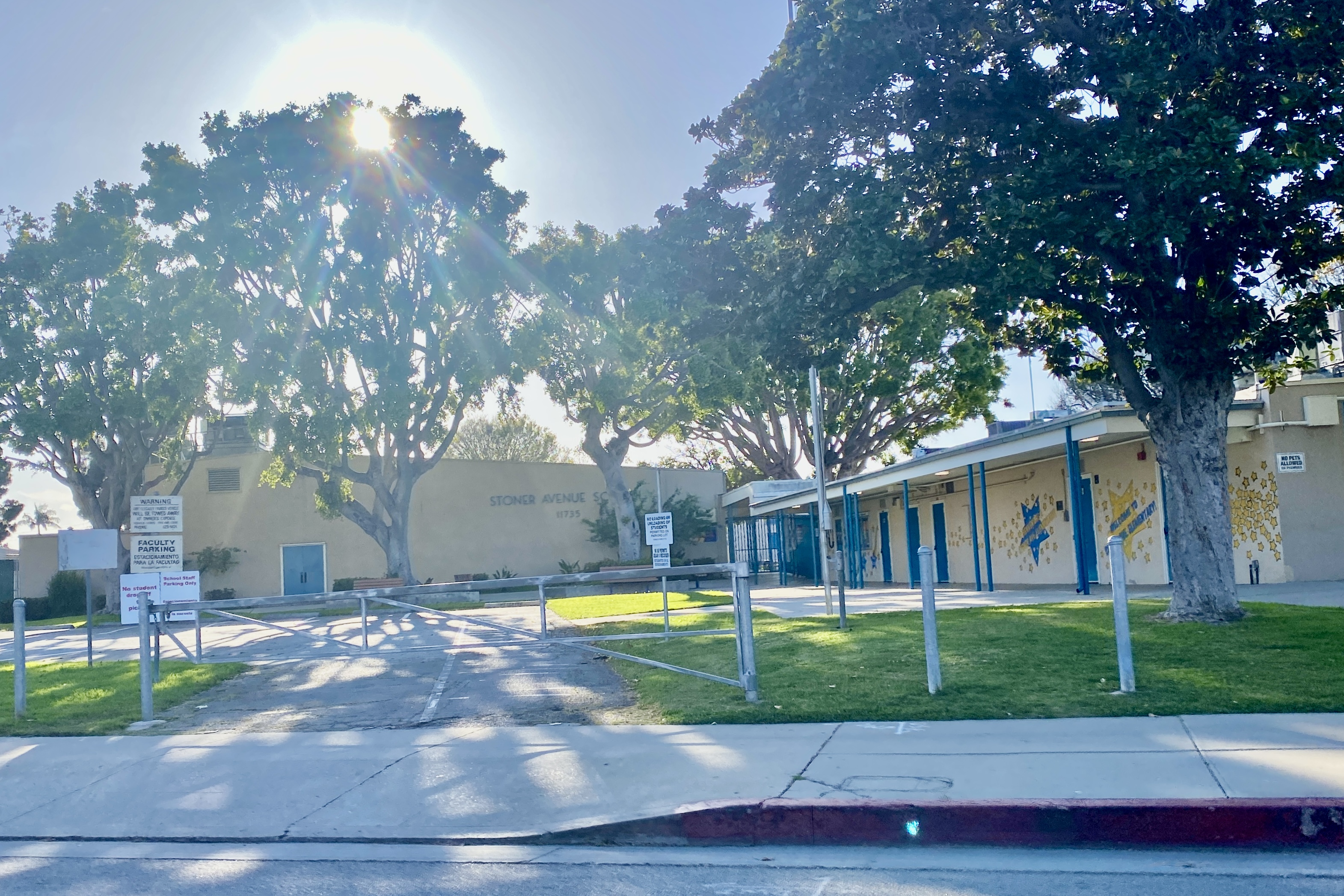
Stoner Avenue Elementary School

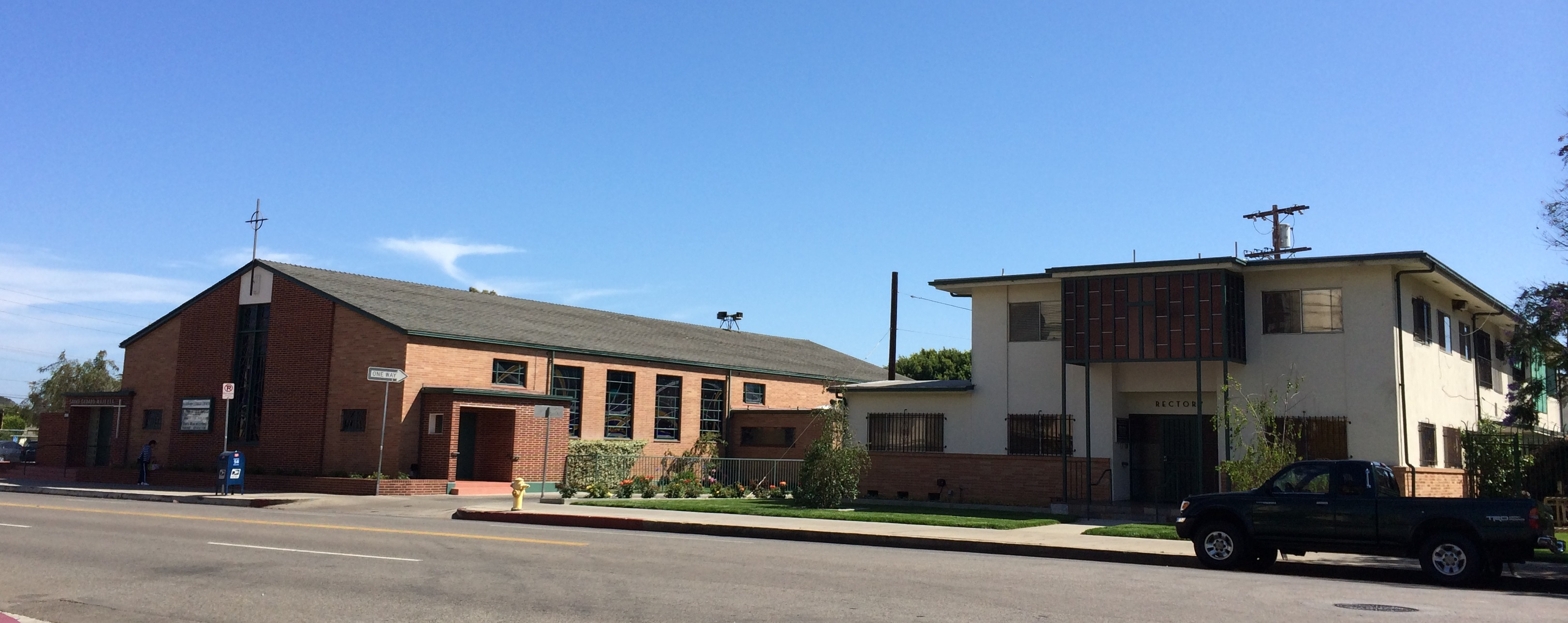
St. Gerard Majella Catholic Church is host to a charter school.

Thirty percent of Del Rey residents aged 25 and older had earned a four-year degree by 2000, an average figure for both the city and the county.

The schools within Del Rey are as follows:

- Culver City Christian School, private elementary, 11312 Washington Boulevard
- Stoner Avenue Elementary School, LAUSD, 11735 Braddock Drive
- ICEF Vista Elementary Academy Tk-2, charter school, 11886 Lindblade St
- ICEF Vista Elementary Academy 3-5, charter school, 4471 Inglewood Blvd
- ICEF Vista Middle Academy, charter school, 5456 McConnell Ave
- Braddock Drive Elementary School, LAUSD, 4711 Inglewood Boulevard
- Short Avenue Elementary School, LAUSD, 12814 Maxella Avenue
- Marina del Rey Middle School, LAUSD, 12500 Braddock Drive
- Ocean Charter School, charter elementary and middle, 12870 Panama Street
- Goethe International Charter School, charter elementary, 12500 Braddock Drive

== Parks and recreation ==
Del Rey is served by several parks and greenspaces. Bill Rosendahl Del Rey Park, previously known as Glen Alla Park, is located at 4601 Alla Rd. near the intersection of Alla Rd. and Glencoe Ave. The park contains a playground, basketball and tennis courts, outdoor exercise equipment, and a separate but adjacent dog park. The neighborhood has several pocket parks, including the Maxella Parkette (or Maxella Triangle Park) at the intersection of Maxella Ave., McConnell Blvd., and Mildred Ave. Milton Street Park, at 12500 Milton St., is a pocket park adjacent to the Ballona Creek and the Ballona Creek Bike Path, which begins in Culver City and runs through the entirety of Del Rey before ending in Marina del Rey. The Culver Marina Little League and its associated fields are located at 13120 Culver Blvd. in Del Rey.

Culver West-Alexander Park is located just up the street from the Maxella Parkette, and has tennis and pickleball courts, handball and basketball courts, an indoor rec center, and a playground; however, this park is technically within the city limits of Culver City.
