= Mar Vista Gardens =

Housing project in Los Angeles

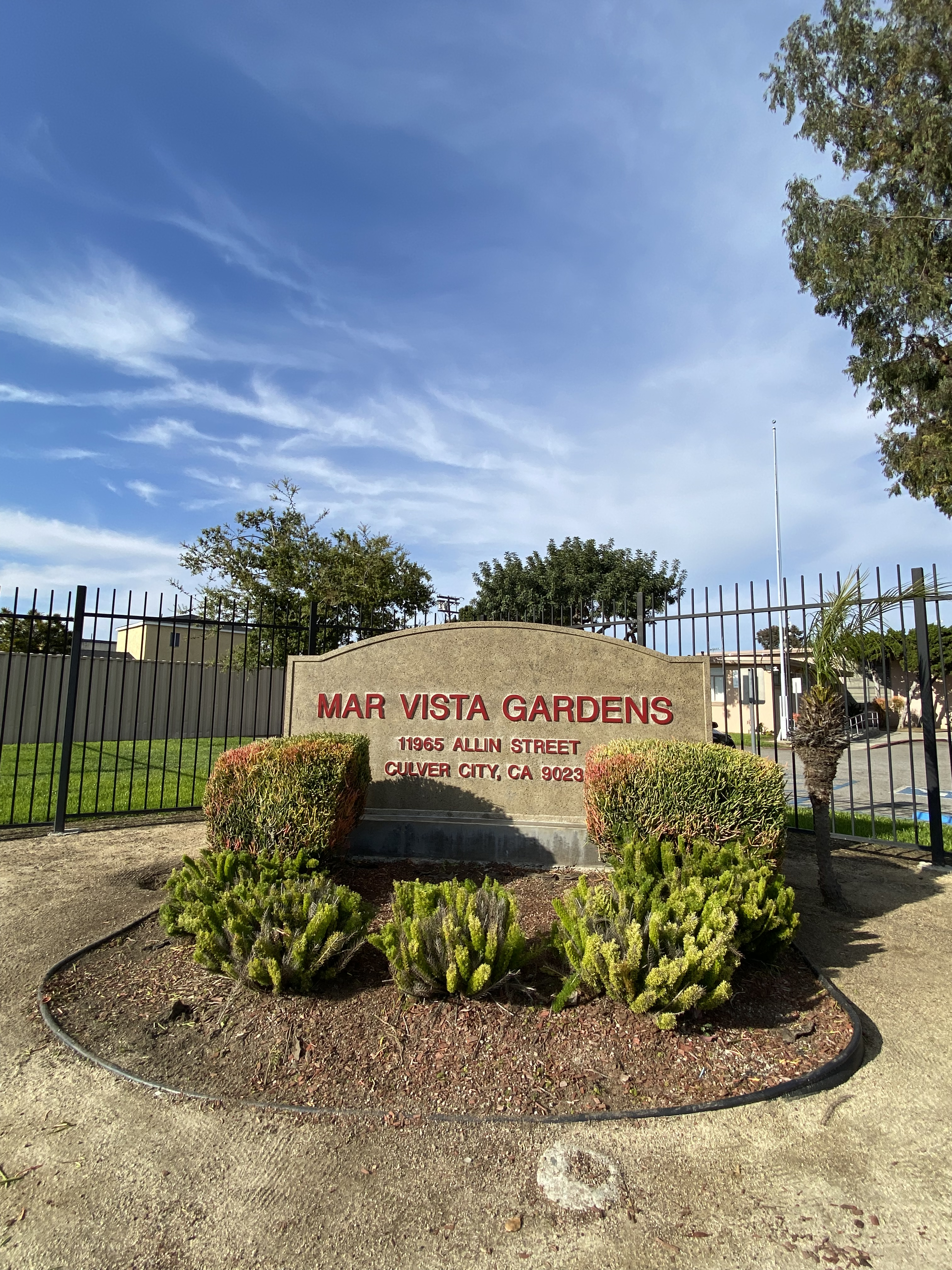
- Interactive map of Mar Vista Gardens

General information
- Location: Los Angeles, California
- Coordinates: 33.9915°N 118.4131°W
- Status: completed

Construction
- Constructed: 1954

Other information
- Governing body: Housing Authority of the City of Los Angeles

Mar Vista Gardens is a housing project at 11965 Allin Street in Del Rey, a district of southwestern Los Angeles near Culver City, bordering Ballona Creek and Sepulveda Creek Channel. It is operated by the Housing Authority of the City of Los Angeles (HACLA).

Designed by architect Albert Criz, it was completed in 1954 as one of the slum clearance measures that were inspired by the Federal Housing Act of 1949.

It is the westernmost large housing project in the Housing Authority of the City of Los Angeles (HACLA) system, and contains 62 buildings and 601 apartments, some of which overlook Ballona Creek. In addition to housing units, the Gardens has athletic fields, handball courts, a gymnasium and a community center. A part-time health clinic is located inside the community center. As of 2020, it is a home for more than 1800 residents.

Mar Vista Gardens, while not located in Culver City proper, has used a Culver City mailing address. When originally built, the area was home to primarily Caucasian families seeking affordable housing. By the 1960s, demographics of the project changed to a predominantly Latino residency. In the 1970s, Mar Vista Gardens saw the rise of the Culver City Boyz, an infamous Chicano street gang. In 2003, some of the Culver City Boyz had been expelled from public housing due to the implementation and enforcement of strict rules. However, the gang remains active, as the constitutionality of the injunction has been tested. Alleged members of the gang settled a class action suit over the practice of enforcing curfews for suspected gang members with the City of Los Angeles for $30 million of job training and apprenticeships for members of the class action suit.

In 2013, Mar Vista was part of a pilot project to allow free access to the Internet for residents in order to help close the digital divide.

The complex was listed on the National Register of Historic Places in 2018.

== Additional images ==
Mar Vista Gardens
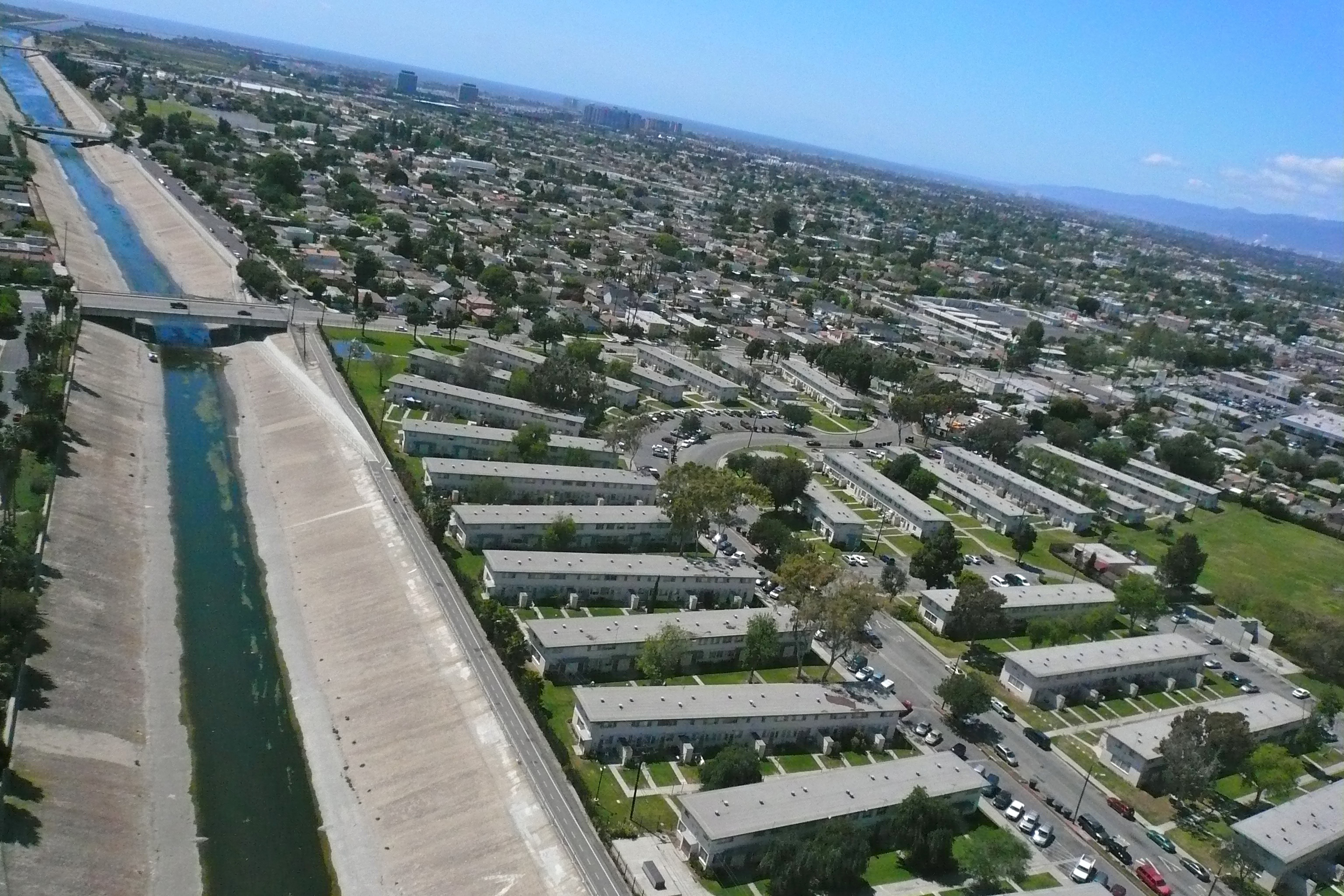
Springtime overnight rains runoff into La Ballona Creek in this picture taken from a kite. Mar Vista Gardens can be seen on the right as a cleanup crew works under the Inglewood Blvd. overpass.

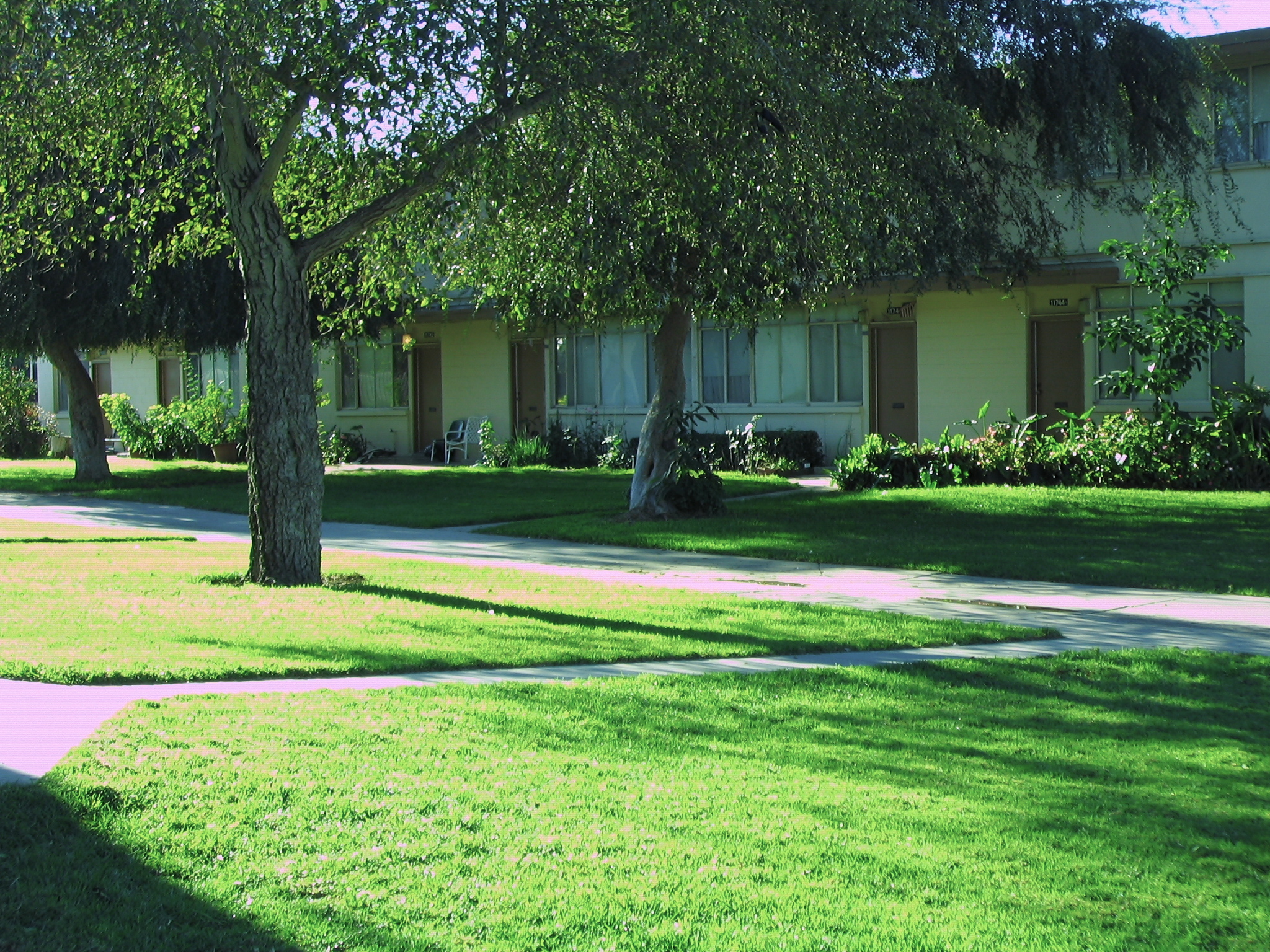
Sunrise in Mar Vista Gardens

== Zoned schools ==
Residents of the complex are zoned to schools in the Los Angeles Unified School District.

- Stoner Ave. Elementary School
- Braddock Drive Elementary School
- Marina del Rey Middle School
- Venice High School

== Notable residents ==
- Art Alexakis (born 1962), lead singer of the band Everclear
- Yolanda del Río (born 1976), ranchera singer
- Todd Bridges (born 1965), actor
