= Pueblo del Sol =

Housing project in Los Angeles, California, United States

Coordinates: 34.0503°N 118.2250°W

Pueblo del Sol is a housing project in Boyle Heights, Los Angeles, California. It is operated by the McCormack Baron Salazar management company.

Administered by the Housing Authority of the City of Los Angeles, Pueblo del Sol occupies the Los Angeles River-side site of the former Aliso Village housing project. Under the HOPE VI grant program introduced by the Clinton administration, the Garden City-influenced Aliso Village was demolished and replaced by a New Urbanist development, Pueblo del Sol. Whereas Aliso Village consisted mostly of apartment buildings, Pueblo del Sol's housing stock is largely semi-detached single family apartments. Most are subsidized to varying degrees. The project reduced the number of units from 685 to 377, a 45% reduction that displaced the majority of the former residents. The project has been criticized for reducing the number of units, at a time when Los Angeles suffers a severe shortage of affordable housing. The families that were displaced from the public housing receive priority in the rental or purchase of the new units. (Displaced households can use Section 8 vouchers to find temporary—or permanent—housing elsewhere.) And the residents and managers of the replacement housing are empowered to enforce a zero-tolerance policy of responsible behavior within the premises.

Pueblo del Sol is served by the Pico/Aliso E Line station.

== Education ==
Residents are zoned to the following Los Angeles Unified School District schools:

- Utah Elementary School (K-8)
- Roosevelt High School
