= American Legion Post 43 =

Historic building in California, United States

Hollywood Post 43 The American Legion
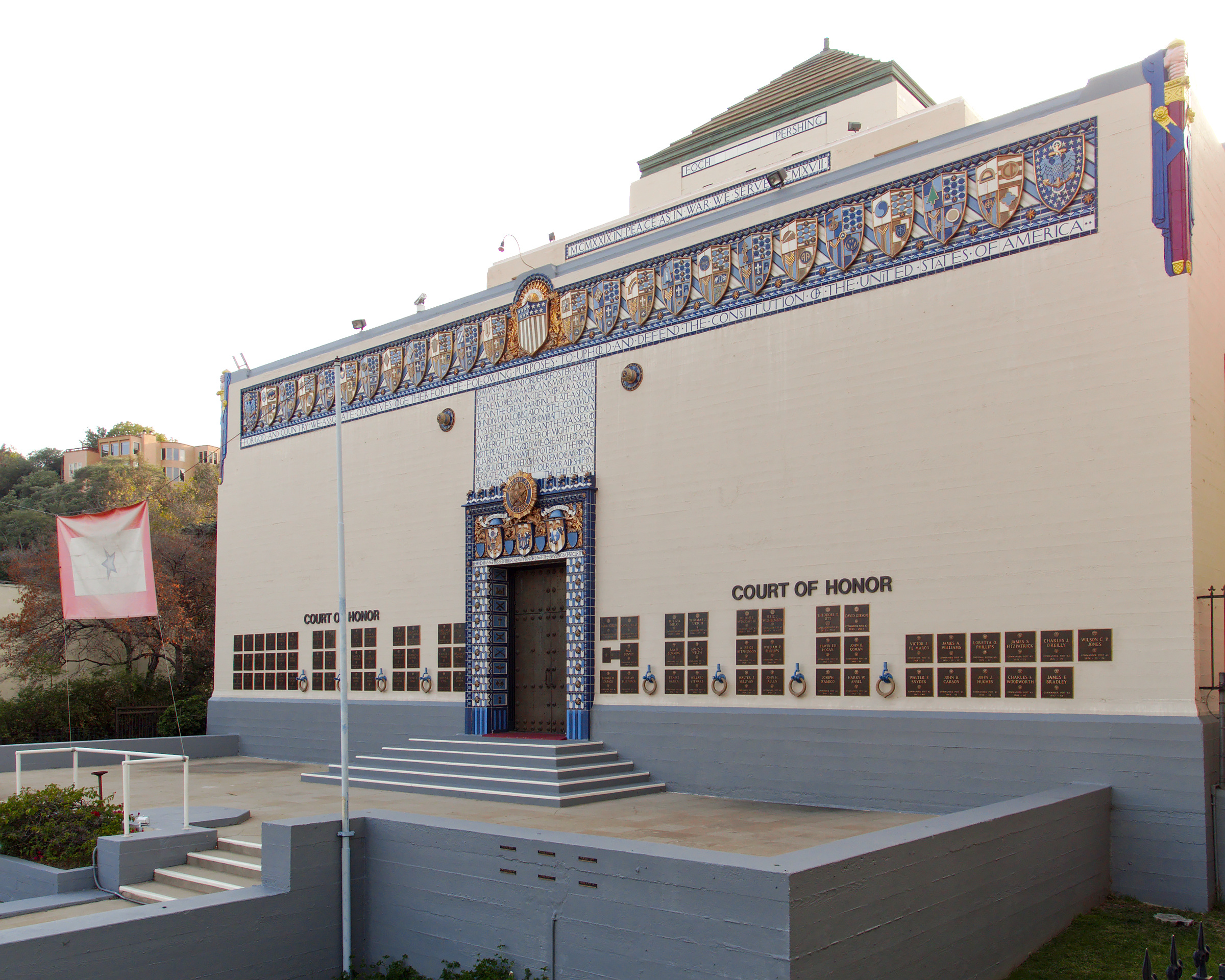

- Location in Los Angeles County
- 34°06′29″N 118°20′16″W
- Location: 2035 North Highland Ave. Los Angeles, California

History
- Built: 1929

Site notes
- Architect: Weston & Weston
- Architectural style: Egyptian Revival

Los Angeles Historic-Cultural Monument
- Designated: 3 November 1989
- Reference no.: 462

American Legion Post 43 is a historic building located in Hollywood, California.

== History ==
American Legion Post 43 was founded in 1919 by World War I veterans in the motion picture business such as founding members Cecil B. DeMille, Walter Long, and Adolph Menjou. Known as the "Post to the Stars", past members have included Hollywood luminaries such as Gene Autry, Humphrey Bogart, Ernest Borgnine, Clark Gable, Charlton Heston, Stan Lee, Ronald Reagan, Mickey Rooney, and Rudy Vallee.

Many of the post's World War II celebrity members served in the Army Air Forces' First Motion Picture Unit, stood up by Lt Col Jack Warner, at the request of General "Hap" Arnold, to create recruitment and training films. Lt Reagan served as the unit's personnel officer. The First Motion Picture Unit is survived today as the U.S. Air Force's 4th Combat Camera Squadron, which still maintains ties to the post.

The post's historic clubhouse was completed in 1929, formally opening its doors on July 4. It was built in the Egyptian Revival style by architects and fellow Legionnaires Weston and Weston, also known for the NRHP listed Amelia Earhart Library. The property features an iconic art-deco bar that has since become a popular filming location. Its 6,000 square foot theater has been a popular venue for studios to introduce new stars to the veteran community since its inception, and recently completed a multi-million dollar renovation to bring it up to date with modern digital sound and projection technology in 2019.

Unlike many posts around the country, Post 43 has been able to maintain its relevancy into the 21st century, attracting many of the recent veterans of Iraq and Afghanistan with its forward thinking leadership continuing to partner with Hollywood and assist transitioning veterans into the many technical roles needed in Hollywood.

The property was recognized by the City of Los Angeles, Cultural Heritage Commission, Cultural Affairs Department Historic-Cultural Monument No. 462 on November 3, 1989, and by the Windsor Square-Hancock Park Historical Society landmark #101 in 2010.

=== Recording history ===
Columbia Records used the hall for both classical and jazz recording sessions. Oscar Levant recorded an album there in 1959. And the "Gone With the Wind" album by the Dave Brubeck Quartet was recorded there in 1959.

=== Concert history ===
From 1994 - 2000 the Hollywood American Legion was a venue for a wide variety of music genre performances. Notable artists include: The Cure, Massive Attack, Portishead, Moby, Jeff Buckley, Jamiroqui, Beck, Orbital, Tool, Foo Fighters, Iggy Pop, Morphine, Fatboy Slim, Porno for Pyros, The Chemical Brothers, The Orb, and Erasure. All of the concerts at the Legion were produced by Philip Blaine Presents.

== In popular culture ==
The property has been featured in many film and television shows, including Squadron of Honor, The Shining, Star Trek, and American Crime Story.

== See also ==
- Hollywood Legion Stadium
