= Gonzaque Village =

Public housing project in Watts, Los Angeles, California

Gonzaque Village Hacienda Village
- HACLA property
- Interactive map of Gonzaque Village
- Coordinates: 33°56′27″N 118°14′49″W
- Country: United States
- State: California
- City: Los Angeles
- Neighborhood: Watts
- ZIP Code: 90002
- Area code: 323

Gonzaque Village is public housing project located in the Watts neighborhood of Los Angeles, California. It is operated by the Housing Authority of the City of Los Angeles. It was built in 1942 on 17.6 acres (71,200 m^{2}) of flat land. Its 71 one-story buildings have 182 units housing 437 residents.

== History ==
The housing project was originally known as Hacienda Village and was constructed in 1942. The project was exempt from World War II-related construction bans because low-income defense workers were slated to receive priority in the rental process. Due to war-related rations, the houses were constructed without many materials needed by the United States armed forces, particularly metal. The project was designed by Los Angeles architect Paul Revere Williams with eventual Beverly Hills mayor E. P. Dentzel acting as the general contractor. The project cost US$503,206 and was completed in May 1942.

In December 2000, the project was renamed Gonzaque Village in honor of Ozie B. Gonzaque, a longtime South Central Los Angeles resident known for her volunteer work in the area.

=== Criminal activity ===
Over time, Gonzaque Village developed a reputation for its high frequency of gang-related crimes. The Los Angeles Times dubbed the Gonzaque Village project "one of the most dangerous in the nation." In a 1993 study conducted by the RAND Corporation think tank focusing on nine public housing projects in Los Angeles, Hacienda Village was found to have the most crime of the group and a higher overall crime rate than the citywide average.

Two rival gangs affiliated with the Gonzaque Village project are the Village Boys and the Hacienda Village Bloods; their territories are arbitrarily divided by the project's 106th Street.

In 1988, the city of Los Angeles established nine mobile homes in the Hacienda Village area to house homeless families. After one of the trailers was lit ablaze by an arsonist, the media purported an open hostility from the existing Hacienda Village residents towards the newcomers, and some perceived that Los Angeles mayor Tom Bradley implied a Hacienda Village resident started the fire in his comments about the incident. Residents refuted the alleged disdain for the newcomers with many citing their similar experiences with poverty and others expressing appreciation for the initiative's goal of alleviating homelessness. After the incident, a 24-hour police watch was temporarily installed at the housing complex as the mobile homes were prepared for move-ins.

On the evening of January 13, 2017, Hacienda Village Bloods member Alonzo Melson confronted Samuel Navarette, a Village Boys affiliate who was sitting in his car with a Village Boys member and a third unaffiliated passenger. Melson asked the occupants of the car where they were from and proceeded to fire at least 15 rounds into the vehicle, killing Navarette but leaving the other two passengers uninjured. Casings found at the scene indicated that neither Navarette nor any of his passengers fired back at Melson. Melson was convicted of Navarette's murder, the attempted murder of the two passengers, shooting at an occupied motor vehicle, and being a felon in possession of a firearm. Melson received a combined 150 years to life for the several charges.

In 2021, Gonzaque Village's overall crime rate dropped 26.3% from 2020.

== Emergency services ==
=== Police service ===
Los Angeles Police Department operates the nearby Southeast Community Police Station.

== Education ==
The following Los Angeles Unified School District schools that serve the complex include:

- Compton Avenue Elementary School
- Markham Middle School
- Jordan High School
