= Slum clearance in the United States =

Urban renewal strategy used in the US

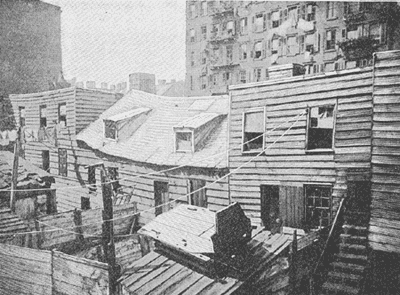
A row of houses in the Five Points neighborhood of Manhattan c. 1879

Slum clearance in the United States has been used as an urban renewal strategy to regenerate derelict or run-down districts, intended to be replaced with alternative developments or new housing. Although early calls were made during the 19th century, mass slum clearance began in the 1930's with the National Industrial Recovery Act of 1933. After World War II, mass slum clearance continued with the introduction of the Housing Act of 1949; the scheme ended in 1974 having driven over 2,000 projects with costs in excess of $50 billion.

== Background ==
Contemporary slums have been dated back to population growth in industrial cities during the Industrial Revolution. Working people moving to cities found affordable housing, usually in small freestanding wooden homes without indoor plumbing, that were often subdivided into multiple housing units. In especially populous urban areas, inexpensive housing for workers included denser buildings, such as multi-story tenements in New York City, row houses in mid-Atlantic cities, and freestanding two-flats in Chicago.

Congress authorized $20,000 for a survey of large city slum conditions in 1892, although did not take any action until the final year of the Hoover administration in 1932. The definition of a slum was classed by the Federal Housing Act of 1937 as "any area where dwellings predominate which, by reason of dilapidation, overcrowding, faulty arrangements or design, lack of ventilation, light or sanitation facilities, or any combination of these factors, are detrimental to safety, health or morals".

== 20th century policy ==
The 1929 Wall Street Crash and subsequent Great Depression caused significant turmoil in the nation's housing market. Although the Emergency Relief and Construction Act of 1932 - an early response to the crisis by President Hoover - included authorization for loans to support slum clearance and new low-rent housing, the federal government intervened more directly in the housing market after President Franklin D. Roosevelt took office. The National Industrial Recovery Act of 1933, which established the Public Works Administration (PWA), authorized the government to directly engage in slum clearance and developing low-cost housing projects, supported by a $3.3 billion appropriation. The PWA's Housing Division produced 51 housing projects, about half of which were built on land previously occupied by slum housing. Slum clearance was essential to maintaining political support for the Housing Division; business leaders and property owners wanted the federal government to build new, higher-quality housing projects, but opposed an overall expansion of the housing supply that might compete with their own real estate.

In 1949, the Senate Banking and Currency Committee stated in its report that 1 in 5 urban families lived in slum conditions. Federal law required cities to relocate displaced residents in safe and sanitary permanent residences prior to demolition of their slum home, with priority for available public housing. A report in 1950 suggested that over 6 million dwellings, representing around 20% of all city housing, did not meet minimum sanitation standards.

Following World War II, housing issues became top of the domestic policy agenda, including the eradication of slums. Congress in 1949 approved the Housing and Home Finance Agency to offer local assistance with renewal projects with grants between 66 and 75% of the project cost. In some cities, slums were cleared solely for aesthetic reasons with little regard for those displaced. Despite 6.5 million new housing units built between 1945 and 1952, some cities saw an expansion in slum areas.

While slum clearance did not feature prominently during the 1952 presidential election, President-elect Dwight D. Eisenhower referred to the requirement of having decent housing for Americans forced to live in slums as a "moral obligation". In 1957, Congress began planning for new legislation that would help to clear slum areas, having authorized the federal government to provide $1.25 billion of funding since 1949 to cities for regeneration or demolition of run-down neighborhoods. States that were promised funding included $143 million for New York, $83 million for Illinois and nearly $29 million for Massachusetts. Some states, such as Florida, Mississippi and South Carolina, did not pass laws that would have allowed their communities to participate in slum clearance schemes. The Eisenhower administration intended to reduce the budget for the Urban Renewal Program from $250 million to $175 million for the 1958 fiscal year, however following protests from city mayors across the country, Congress ultimately chose to increase the budget to $350 million.

As of June 1966, projects which had gained approval had clearance intended or completed for over 400,000 houses, displacing over 300,000 families. Within the clearance areas, 35% was proposed for residential redevelopment while just over a quarter was reserved for streets and footpaths. Although initially starting with wide political support, it became controversial over time. Federally subsidized clearances ended in 1974, after funding over 2,000 renewal projects at a cost of around $50 billion.

== Obstacles ==
The Housing Act of 1949 offered federal subsidies to local redevelopment projects, allowing local agencies to clear and sell blighted land for redevelopment, up to a limit of $808 million per year. Federal subsidies helped alleviate potential hurdles in acquiring land with high purchase costs. In some cases, cities were unwilling to progress with slum clearance unless significant amounts of the original upfront cost could be reclaimed by sale of the improved land. Estimates from the National Association of Home Builders suggested that subsidies authorized to the maximum amount could have cost in excess of $12 billion.

The act was hindered by defensive priorities, with clearance grants deferred if the project was not consistent with defense requirements. Clearance of slum and blighted areas could be justified as serving the defensive effort as these areas were considered the most vulnerable in the event of enemy attack. In 1951, 32 cities and towns surveyed indicated that much of their cleared land was to be reused for private residential developments, with some public housing also included.

Some slum clearance projects suffered delays as a result of local resident hostility towards clearance and forced migration. In some neighborhoods, foreign-born and minority ethnic residents occupied some of the worst city center housing, yet they feared moving away from their own language and cultural groups. African Americans in particular felt strongly that their areas and houses were targeted for urban renewal through means of ethnic cleansing and that they would be classed as the "wrong" type of people to be living in the city, helpless to prevent it without proper policy or controls in place.

Clearance programs garnered some criticism, particularly at the lack of attention given to the potential of regenerating existing structures deemed to be dilapidated. Some slums may have been viable for inexpensively cleaning up through use of stricter safety and sanitation enforcement. In the mid 20th century, a housing court was established in Baltimore with the power to impose penalties for violations of agreed codes of practice, which in turn helped to regenerate around 16,000 slum properties.

== Redevelopments ==
Proposals for slum clearance came as early as the 1820s in relation to the Five Points neighborhood in Lower Manhattan, New York City. Efforts towards the late 19th century were successful in razing the Mulberry Bend area, then deemed to be one of the most blighted sections of the neighborhood.

Mar Vista Gardens is a housing project completed in 1954 built on an abandoned celery field. Construction paused in the early 1950s when a 6.4 acre strip of land was discovered to be county territory and was annexed in 1952 as part of slum clearance measures. Manhattanville Houses is a public housing project built during the late 1950s on slum clearance land formerly occupied by tenement blocks.

== Support by eugenicists ==
Support for slum clearance was partially influenced by proponents of eugenics, an ideology that promoted racist and misogynistic ideas for improving the “genetic quality” of the population. Members of the American Eugenics Society strongly advocated in favor of slum clearance as a way to exert control over reproduction of families they deemed desirable or undesirable. On the one hand, eugenicists believed that slums constrained the reproduction of ‘desirable’ families, mostly due to their small size; on the other hand, eugenicists associated the poor hygienic conditions of slums with racially biased ideas about ‘undesirable’ families. While there is little evidence that the eugenics movement directly influenced the design of US housing policy, eugenics ideology did influence public perception of slum clearance programs. Media accounts of slums associated the poor housing conditions with ‘undesirable’ traits of residents; some popular reports intended to generate support for slum clearance projects, such as Mongrel Virginians, visually compare impoverished residents to animals.

== See also ==
- Subsidized housing in the United States
- Slum clearance in the United Kingdom
- Slum clearance in India
