= Daniel Ramos (graffiti artist) =

American graffiti artist

Chaka
- Born: Daniel Ramos; August 27, 1972 (age 53)
- Known for: Prolific tagging in the 1980s and 90s
- Style: Tagging
- Movement: Graffiti
- Website: chakatheone.com

Tag

Daniel "Chaka" Ramos (born August 27, 1972) is an American graffiti artist. He was responsible for the "CHAKA" tags that began to appear throughout the state of California during the late 1980s and early 1990s. He has been described as one of the most prolific graffiti writers of the late 20th century.

Ramos acquired the moniker in 1980 from his friends while living in the Aliso Village Housing Projects in Boyle Heights. The name was derived from the name of the proto-human "Cha-Ka" (played by actor Philip Paley) from the 1974 Sid and Marty Krofft TV series Land of the Lost. In November 1990, Ramos was arrested after tagging on a Lincoln Heights traffic light three months after his 18th birthday. He subsequently pleaded guilty to 10 counts of vandalism, and was sentenced to three years' probation and 1,560 hours of community service.

Authorities in Los Angeles identified approximately 10,000 unique tags in "bold, capital letters" (although Ramos himself later claimed closer to 40,000) bearing the moniker on various surfaces of public and private property — including walls, bridges, freeway signs and lampposts — done primarily through the use of spray paint. The graffiti caused an estimated one million dollars in property damage. Only 24 hours after being released from jail on probation, he was arrested again for allegedly scrawling his name on a courthouse elevator door.

In the music video for the song "Smells like Teen Spirit" by Nirvana, Dave Grohl's drum kit can be seen with the word "CHAKA" written on it in white lettering. It is alleged that just before the video was filmed, Dave saw the ubiquitous "CHAKA" tag while driving from Seattle to California and decided to decorate his drums with it.

Ramos still resides in Los Angeles. He hosted his first legitimate solo art show in April 2009 and continues to produce art.
