= Avalon Gardens =

Public housing in California, United States

- Interactive map of Avalon Gardens

General information
- Location: 701 East 88th Place, Los Angeles, California
- Status: 164 units

Construction
- Constructed: 1941

Other information
- Governing body: Housing Authority of the City of Los Angeles

The Avalon Gardens is a public housing project located in the Green Meadows neighborhood of Los Angeles, California. It is one of the oldest housing projects owned by the Housing Authority of the City of Los Angeles.

== History ==
Avalon Gardens was constructed in 1941 during World War II for military families and veterans at a cost of $638,000. In 1947, the housing projects were open to low income residents. Since there was a significant waiting list to get into the newly built homes, it was not until the 1950s that the residents went from military families to low-income families. In the early 1970s it became the turf of the Avalon Garden Crips gang led by Jimel Barnes, who lived in the project. In the late 1970s the buildings began to deteriorate and they experienced an increase in crime. By the early 1990s it was labeled as a "war zone" and was dominated by drug activity and violence. In 1996 the Housing Authority of the City of Los Angeles implemented a $1.7-million project in which a decorative wrought-iron fence and 11-foot-high wall were built around the complex to decrease crime and gang activity. After its completion, Avalon Gardens became a gated community, and crime and gang violence decreased. From 1971 to 1973 an organization known as the Jonathan Jackson Educational Cadre began working to educate the youth. They developed a reading program, the George Jackson Karate class, afterwards they would march the youth around the project singing songs about unity.Also they would screen political education films and serve the youth food afterwards. There is a documentary about the group called, Jackson Not Just A Name.

== Education ==
Residents are zoned to the following Los Angeles Unified School District schools:

- 93rd Street Elementary School
- Drew Middle School
- John C. Fremont High School
