= Aliso Village =

Former public housing complex in Boyle Heights, Los Angeles

Aliso Village housing projects

General information
- Type: residential
- Location: Mission Rd. Boyle Heights, California, United States
- Coordinates: 34.047829°N 118.227746°W
- Completed: 1942
- Owner: Housing Authority of the City of Los Angeles

Design and construction
- Architects: Walter S. Davis, Weston & Weston, and others

Aliso Village was a housing project in Los Angeles, California. It was built in 1942 and demolished 1999. The 29-acre (120,000 m^{2}) parcel was replaced by Pueblo del Sol.

The complex was owned and managed by the Housing Authority of the City of Los Angeles.

== History ==
Aliso Village was one of the most impoverished areas of the city, and by the 1930s was considered one of the last remaining slums in the United States. Reformer Jacob Riis had visited The Flats in 1905 and 1908 and reported that the slums are worst in country and rents are higher. A survey conducted by the city in the 1937 deemed 20% of the city's dwellings "unfit for human habitation," including most of The Flats. During World War II, the Housing Authority of the City of Los Angeles (HACLA) razed The Flats and built Aliso Village projects in their place. The landscaping was by the firm of Bashford and Barlow. Like most of HACLA's 1940s projects, the Aliso Village projects were hailed at the time of their construction as some of the finest examples of the principles espoused by the garden city movement, and were racially integrated to boot.

Soon after the end the war, Aliso Village lost most of their non-Latino populations, and were increasingly populated by Mexican immigrants. With the river on one side and a massive rail yard on another, the construction of the East Los Angeles Interchange further isolated them from the rest of the city, and the closure of the Pacific Electric Railway dramatically reduced the mobility of many of the projects' residents. By the 1970s, overcrowding had eliminated much of Aliso Village's once-vaunted green spaces, physical deterioration had become rampant, and gangs were an increasing problem. In the 1980s the residents of Aliso Village began to organize with the support of Dolores Mission Church and its community organization, UNO, and began to address these problems. By the late eighties the residents of the two housing projects had developed a network of community groups that pushed for better services and began negotiating truces between the different gangs, thus reducing the level of violence. In 1996, HACLA wrote off the projects, against the residents desires'. In 2000 Aliso Village was demolished and replaced with the New Urbanist, Pueblo del Sol "workforce housing" project. In the process two thirds of the residents of the housing projects were displaced in a situation reminiscent of the Chavez Ravine incident.

== Crime/gang activity ==
Aliso Village had a very high crime and poverty rate in the 1980s and 1990s. In addition to a number of gangs that carved out territory in the complex from the 1940s to the 1990s. Such gangs being the 1st Street East Coast Crips (extinct), Primera Flats 13, The Mob Crew 13, Al Capone 13 (inactive/relocated), Cuatro Flats 13, East Los Angeles 13 and Aliso Village Brims/Bloods (extinct).

== Schools ==
Utah Street Elementary school was located at the center of the Aliso Village projects. Utah Street school was mainly attended by Aliso Village residents.

Pico Aliso and Pico residents had to walk up the hill to Second Street Elementary School.

== Notable residents ==
- Sam Balter – basketball, 1936 Summer Olympics
- Felipe Esparza – stand-up comedian and actor
- Mike Garrett – football, won 1965 Heisman Trophy
- Paul Gonzales – boxer, 1984 Summer Olympics
- Daniel Ramos – Graffiti tagger, known for tagging "CHAKA"
- Sylvester - disco singer, most notable for "You Make Me Feel (Mighty Real)" and "Dance (Disco Heat)"
