= Weston & Weston =

American architectural partnership

Practice information
- Partners: Francis Eugene Weston; Joseph Fegan Weston
- Dissolved: late 1931/early 1932
- Location: Los Angeles, California

Significant works and honors
- Buildings: North Hollywood Amelia Earhart Regional Library; American Legion Post 43

Weston & Weston was an architecture partnership that consisted of brothers Francis Eugene Weston (also known as Eugene Weston Jr.) and Joseph Fegan Weston. They designed several significant buildings in Los Angeles, California, most notably American Legion Post 43 and North Hollywood Amelia Earhart Regional Library, both of which are Los Angeles Historic-Cultural Monuments (LAHCM), the latter of which is also listed in the National Register of Historic Places (NRHP).

== History ==
=== Francis Weston ===
Francis Eugene Weston
- Born: January 12, 1896; Bloomington, California
- Died: December 23, 1969 (aged 73)
- Occupation: Architect
- Parent(s): Eugene Weston and Margaret Fegan
- Practice: Weston & Weston (1924 - 1931/32)

Francis Eugene Weston was born in Bloomington, California to Eugene Weston and Margaret Fegan on January 12, 1896. He had two brothers and one sister, and often went by the name Frances Eugene Weston Jr.

Francis earned his California architecture license in 1924 and partnered with his brother Joseph from 1924 to late 1931/early 1932. He chaired the Los Angeles Chamber of Commerce in 1960 and died on December 23, 1969.

=== Joseph Weston ===
Joseph Fegan Weston
- Born: March 2, 1893; Clinton, Iowa
- Died: April 25, 1963 (aged 70)
- Burial place: El Carmelo Cemetery, Pacific Grove, California
- Occupation: Architect
- Spouse: Carol Caskey
- Children: 1
- Parent(s): Eugene Weston and Margaret Fegan
- Practice: Weston & Weston (1924 - 1931/32); Winslow and Weston (c. 1935–1936)

Joseph Fegan Weston was born March 2, 1893 to Eugene Weston and Margaret Fegan in Clinton, Iowa. He had two brothers and one sister. During World War I, he served as a United States Army Signal Corps aerial observer.

Joseph worked as a draftsman for Carleton Winslow from 1917 to 1920. was a licensed California architect since at least 1923. He partnered with his brother Francis from 1924 to late 1931/early 1932 and with Carleton Winslow c. 1935–1936.

Joseph married Carol Caskey and the two had one child together. Joseph died on April 25, 1963 and was buried at El Carmelo Cemetery in Pacific Grove, California.

== Selected works ==
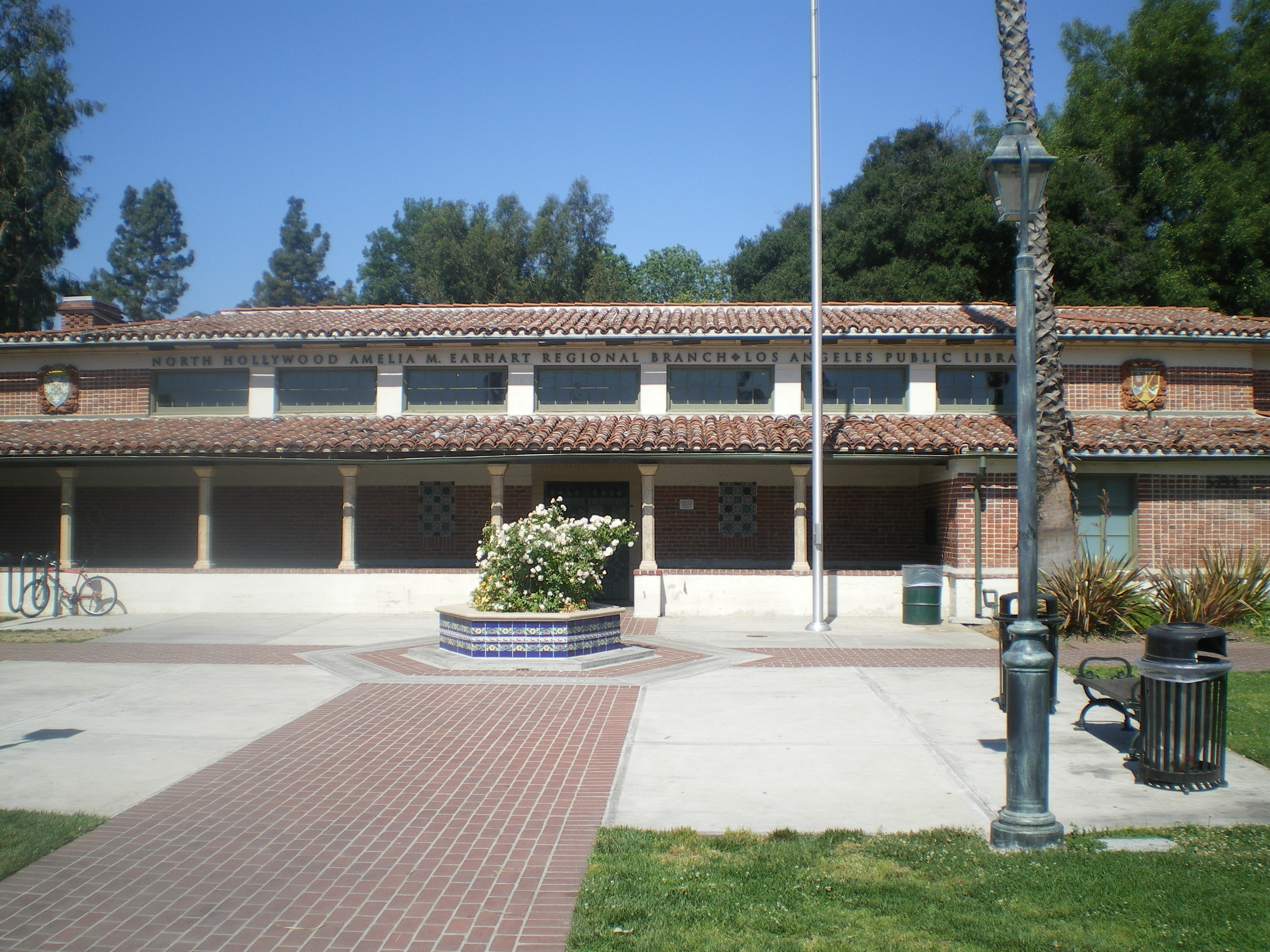
Los Angeles Public Library Amelia Earhart Branch

Buildings designed by Weston & Weston (in Los Angeles, California unless otherwise noted) include:

- Technicolor Motion Picture Company Film Laboratory Building (1924)
- Farmers and Merchants Bank of Los Angeles branch at 7th and Mateo Street (1924–1925)
- Security Trust and Savings branch at 10th and Bronson Street (1925)
- Los Angeles Public Library Alessandro Branch (1925–1926)
- Los Angeles Public Library Amelia Earhart Branch (1929), NRHP No. 87001018, LAHCM No. 302
- American Legion Post 43 (1929), LAHCM No. 462
- Paul W. Ivey House (1930)

== See also ==
- List of American architects
