= Rancho San Pedro (public housing) =

Public housing project in Los Angeles, California

Coordinates: 33.7431°N 118.2831°W

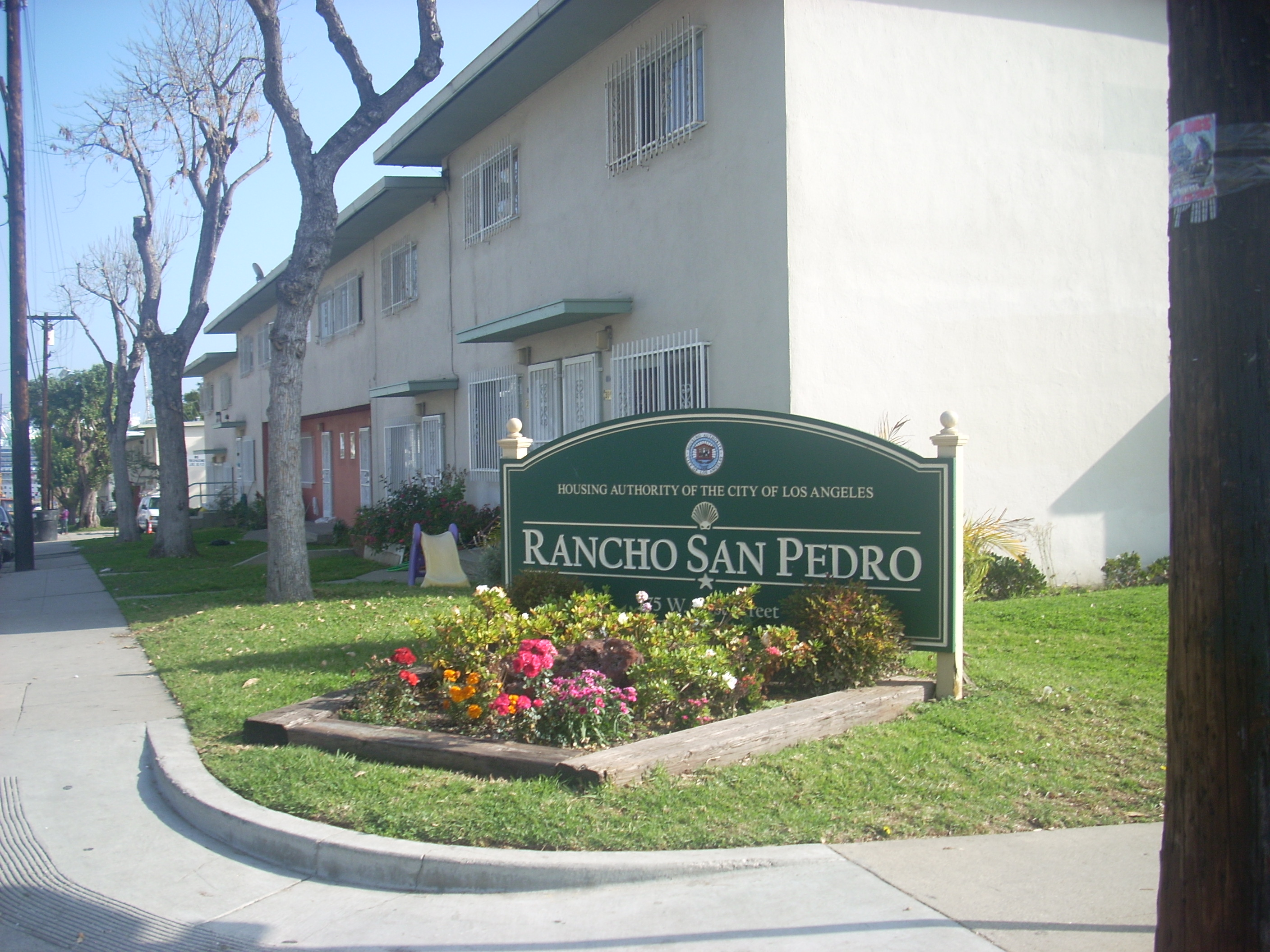
Rancho San Pedro sign

Rancho San Pedro is a public housing project located in San Pedro, Los Angeles, California, near the Harbor of Los Angeles. Built in 1942, it is operated by the Housing Authority of the City of Los Angeles. The lot is 12 acres. A 191-unit extension was added later.

== Notable incidents ==
Until 1996, the Dodge City Crips and Rancho San Pedro Locos coexisted in the Rancho San Pedro housing projects until when a Dodge City Crip member was murdered. Allegedly the Rancho San Pedro Gang were behind the killing. Fatal shootouts would occur between Dodge City and Rancho San Pedro members.
