= Charles Dickson (artist) =

American sculptor (born 1947)

- Dickson in 2025
- Born: 1947 (age 78–79); Los Angeles, California, US
- Education: John C. Fremont High School
- Years active: 1959 - present
- Known for: Sculpture, Public Art
- Notable work: Symbols of Unity - The Idea of Freedom (1992); Divine Order: Manifestation of the Soaring Spirit (1995); Wishing on a Star (2010); Car Culture (forthcoming)
- Movement: Black Arts Movement, Contemporary Art
- Website: https://www.thedicksonstudio.com

Charles Dickson (born 1947) is an American artist and sculptor. He lives and works in Los Angeles, where he has created small to large-scale sculptures honoring Black culture for decades. The Los Angeles Times named Dickson’s public sculpture Wishing on a Star one of sixteen must-see artworks in Los Angeles County. A key figure in the Black Arts Movement in Los Angeles in the 1960s and 1970s, he is groundskeeper for the historic Watts Towers and a veteran artist-in-residence at the Watts Towers Arts Center.

== Early life ==
Charles Edward Dickson was born in September 1947 in Los Angeles, California, and raised in South Los Angeles. He attended and graduated from John C. Fremont High School, where he was later inducted into the school’s Hall of Fame. Dickson began whittling wood at the age of five and sold his first artwork at the age of twelve. He attributes his early artistic interest and pursuit to his father, a master baker and cake designer, and his mother, an interior design enthusiast. Dickson suffered from asthma from six months old, which would later lead to his exploration of using materials and inventing techniques less threatening to his health, such as HISPUF (high-impact styrene urethane foam core).

== Career ==
Dickson has been active as a self-taught artist, sculptor, and maker in the Los Angeles arts community since the 1960s. He was a part of the Studio Watts Workshop, where he met artists John Outterbridge and Noah Purifoy and worked with found objects. He later worked at the Compton Communicative Arts Academy, a non-profit, school, and artist collective, founded by artist Judson Powell, directed by Outterbridge, and part of the Black Arts Movement in California. From 1971 to 1975, he led and taught the Academy’s sculptural workshop. Through his connection with curator Cecil Fergerson, he was amongst the first African-American artists to exhibit at the Los Angeles County Museum of Art (LACMA).

Dickson crafts detailed sculptures in wood, bronze, acrylic, concrete, metal, acrylic, and other materials. He developed a material and technique called HISPUF (high-impact styrene plastic urethane foam core), which involves heating high-impact plastic with a heat gun of his own making and molding it into lightweight sculptures. Dickson has created large-scale, public sculptures across Los Angeles, often inspired by themes related to the works’ specific site. His public art highlights themes of African American history and historical figures, such as the Dr. Martin Luther King, Jr. and Civil Rights Movement-inspired Symbols of Unity - The Idea of Freedom (1992) in the Dr. Martin Luther King Jr. Plaza in the Watts neighborhood of Los Angeles, and Afrofuturism, such as Wishing on a Star (2010) in Exposition Park at the entrance of the California African American Museum and the forthcoming Car Culture at Destination Crenshaw.

== Public Art ==
=== Symbols of Unity - The Idea of Freedom (1992), Watts, Los Angeles, CA ===
Symbols of Unity - The Idea of Freedom was commissioned by the Community Redevelopment Agency of Los Angeles as one of the first monuments in the city of Los Angeles in honor of Reverend Dr. Martin Luther King, Jr. It is a 1,200 pound bronze hand with a hummingbird at its fingertip. The sculpture sits on a triangular, black granite platform shaped like a pulpit. White porcelain concrete relief sculptures of civil rights marchers are etched into two sides of the platform facing the parking lot. On the side of the platform that faces a pedestrian walkway, King’s I Have a Dream speech is engraved. Below the engraving are gold shoeprints. The sculpture is installed at the Dr. Martin Luther King, Jr. Shopping Plaza in the Watts neighborhood of Los Angeles.

=== Divine Order: Manifestation of the Soaring Spirit (1995), Metro K Line Mariposa Station, Los Angeles, CA ===
Dickson was one of fourteen artists commissioned by Los Angeles Metro to design one of its elevated light rail stations on the K Line of the Los Angeles Metro Rail system. Entitling his work Divine Order: Manifestation of the Soaring Spirit, he added artistic design elements to each aspect of the station, Mariposa station, including its elevator, stairs, walls, and pavement, as well as specifically designing shade canopies in the shape of pyramids and station benches in the shape of butterfly clusters. Materials used throughout the station include concrete, glass, steel, and ceramic. Dickson etched “Terrazzo sunburst patterns” and space and aeronautical imagery into the elevator and glass. Granite pavers and painted columns include scientific drawings and imagery such as computer chips embedded with human figures. Dickson combined representations of the station’s name and location into the design: “Mariposa” means butterfly in Spanish, a reference to the local preservation of the endangered El Segundo blue butterfly; the aerospace industry of the city of El Segundo, where the station is located, inspires the symbols of flight etched throughout the station.

=== Wishing On A Star (2009), Exposition Park, Los Angeles, CA ===
Wishing on a Star is an eco-kinetic solar astronaut figure made of rebar, circuit boards, and other materials. At the end of the figure’s extended right arm is a fixture of aluminum and crystals that rotates with wind energy. Dickson created the statue for the California African-American Museum, where it stands at almost 15 feet tall in front of the museum in Exposition Park. Los Angeles Times art critic Christopher Knight named Wishing on a Star one of sixteen must-see works of art in Los Angeles County.

=== Car Culture (forthcoming), Crenshaw District, Los Angeles, CA ===
Car Culture is a forthcoming public art work designed for Destination Crenshaw, the future largest outdoor space for Black art in the United States. The 20-foot high sculpture is made up of three stainless steel Senufo goddess figures mounted with five classic cars and lowriders made of perforated steel and painted in various colors and patterns. Fiberoptic cables will run through the top of the sculpture and emanate light from the cars’ headlights. The sculpture represents a connection between the Black community of Los Angeles and African ancestral culture and honors the car cruising scene once active on Crenshaw Boulevard, where the sculpture will be located.

== Exhibitions ==
In 1972, Dickson was one of fifty-one Black artists included in LACMA’s second exhibition of Black artists, “A Panorama of Black Artists,” alongside John Outterbridge, Betye Saar, Elliott Pinkney, Noah Purifoy, and Richard Wyatt Jr. In 2014, over seventy of Dickson’s works were featured in a retrospective in the Noah Purifoy Gallery and Charles Mingus Gallery at the Watts Towers Arts Center. In addition to LACMA and the Watts Towers Arts Center, his work has been exhibited at the California African American Museum, Craft Contemporary (formerly The Craft and Folk Art Museum), the Los Angeles County Arboretum and Botanic Garden, Roberts & Tilton Gallery, and the William Grant Still Arts Center, among others. Dickson has been featured in over 150 professional exhibitions, art magazines, newspapers, and public television, including the KCET Artbound documentaries, "The Watts Towers Arts Center" and "Black Art: A Brockman Gallery Legacy."
