= Two Centuries of Black American Art =

1976 LACMA exhibition

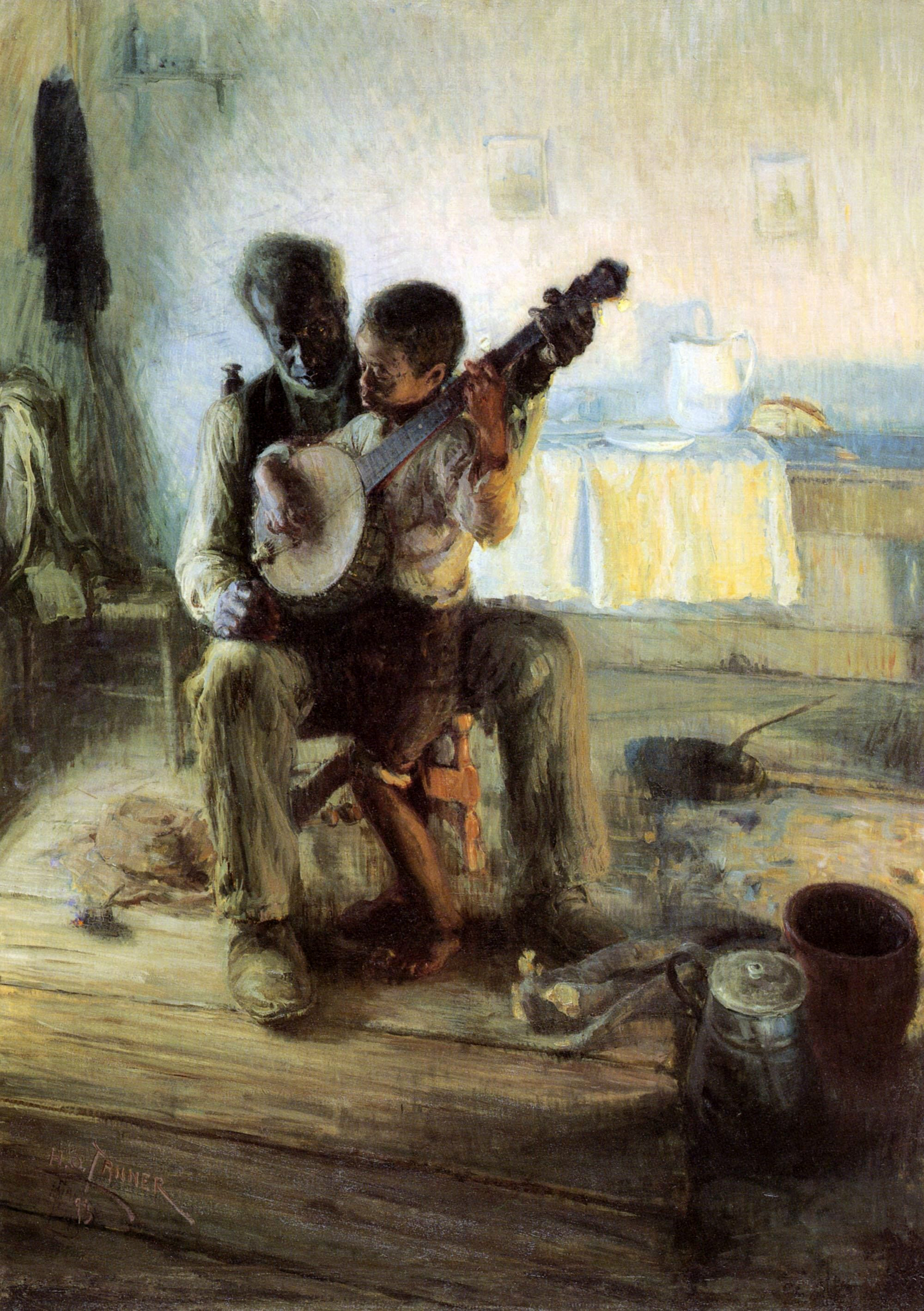
Henry Ossawa Tanner's The Banjo Lesson (1893) was among the works included in the exhibition.

Two Centuries of Black American Art was a 1976 traveling exhibition of African-American art organized by the Los Angeles County Museum of Art (LACMA). It "received greater visibility and validation from the mainstream art world than any other group exhibition of work by Black artists." According to the Grove Encyclopedia of American Art, the "landmark" exhibition "drew widespread public attention to the contributions to African American artists to American visual culture."

== Background ==
LACMA has organized three exhibitions of work by African Americans: Three Graphic Artists: Charles White, David Hammons, Timothy Washington (1971), Los Angeles 1972: A Panorama of Black Artists (1972), and Two Centuries of Black American Art (1976). The Black Arts Council was a driving force behind all three shows. Founded by Cecil Fergerson and Claude Booker (black art preparators who worked at LACMA), the organization comprised African-American artists, staff members, and other city residents who aimed to promote African-American art in Los Angeles. When the Black Arts Council was founded in 1968, every LACMA board member was white.

Following Panorama, the Black Arts Council lobbied LACMA to hold an exhibition of African-American art in its main galleries; Panorama had been held in the basement Art Rental Gallery. After years of pressure, LACMA's deputy director asked David Driskell (then the chair of Fisk University's art department) if he would be interested in guest-curating a survey of African-American art, and requested that he make a formal proposal to LACMA's Board of Trustees.

LACMA's reception of Driskell's June 1974 proposal was decidedly mixed. LACMA's chief curator of modern and contemporary art, Maurice Tuchman, refused to attend the presentation. Fergerson, Tuchman's curatorial assistant at the time, was not invited to the presentation; he later commented that this was likely because he was deemed too radical and "too Black". Board members Franklin Murphy, Sidney F. Brody, Charles Z. Wilson, Jr., and Robert Wilson, however, supported the exhibition, and their opinion prevailed. Donelson Hoopes (curator of American art) and Ruth Bowman (LACMA's director of education) both resigned in response to the board's decision to hold the exhibition.

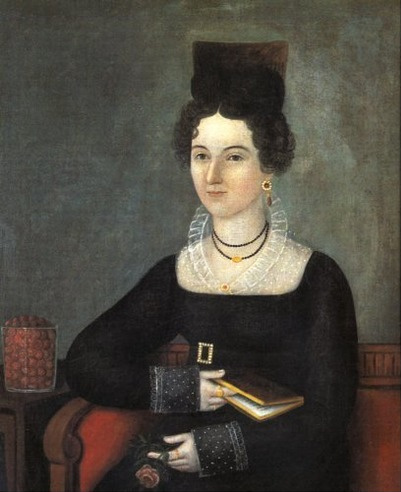
Joshua Johnson's Young Lady on a Red Sofa, c. 1810, included in the exhibition

== Exhibition ==
Phillip Morris and the National Endowment for the Humanities funded the exhibition with $125,000 and $75,000 in grants, respectively.

Driskell said that he deliberately did not select art relating to a unified theme. He said that he believed black art was a "sociological concept" rather than an artistic one, and that his goal in the exhibition was to show that black artists have continuously participated (and "in many cases [have] been the backbone") in American visual culture throughout the country's history.

Works were collected from private collections, living artists themselves, museums, galleries, historical societies, and other institutions. Assembling the exhibition was a challenge because—given the art world's neglect of black artists—many works by talented black artists had not been conserved, and the locations of other works were unknown. In the end, over 200 works by 63 known artists and a number of unknown artists were included in the exhibition.

The exhibition covered the period from 1750 to 1950, though a few works post-dated the ostensible cut-off date. Though covering a broad time period, the exhibition was limited in the number of works it incorporated (as one critic jeered, "Two centuries in five rooms!").

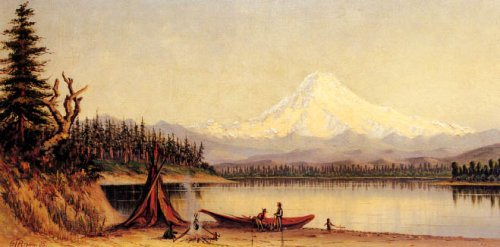
Grafton Tyler Brown's Mount Tacoma, included in the exhibition

The exhibition was on display at LACMA between September 30 and November 21, 1976. Approximately 88,000 people visited the exhibition—then, the highest attendance figure for any exhibition of American art at LACMA. The exhibition later traveled to Atlanta's High Museum of Art (January 8, 1977 – February 20, 1977), the Dallas Museum of Fine Arts (March 30, 1977 – May 15, 1977), and the Brooklyn Museum (June 25, 1977 – August 21, 1977). Other major museums, including those in Chicago and Detroit (each with sizable African-American populations), turned down the exhibit.

Ebony magazine called the exhibition "an impressive and vastly educational exhibit, running a range of folk, classical, ethnic, universal, realistic and imaginative orientations, tracing the development of Afro-American art from anonymous slave artisans through the traditional academic work of the late 18th and 19th centuries, the dynamic 'Negro Renaissance' of the '20s, and the government-sponsored works of the Great Depression era and the social protestations of the '30s and '40s as well as the diverse offerings of the '50s."

It is the "only historically comprehensive exhibition of art by Black Americans ever to be presented by a major American art museum." The La Jolla Museum of Contemporary Art, a smaller museum, had presented Dimensions in Black, another comprehensive survey, in 1970.

=== Artists represented in the exhibition ===
- Charles H. Alston
- William E. Artis
- John James Audubon
- Edward M. Bannister
- Richmond Barthé
- Romare Bearden
- John Biggers
- Grafton Tyler Brown
- Calvin Burnett
- Selma Burke
- Margaret T. Burroughs
- David Butler
- Elizabeth Catlett
- Claude Clark
- Eldzier Cortor
- Allan Rohan Crite
- Dave the Potter
- Thomas Day
- Joseph Delaney
- Aaron Douglas
- Robert S. Duncanson
- William Edmondson
- Minnie Evans
- Edwin A. Harleston
- Palmer Hayden
- James V. Herring
- Felrath Hines
- Earl J. Hooks
- Julien Hudson
- Clementine Hunter
- Wilmer Jennings
- James Butler Johnson
- Malvin Gray Johnson
- Sargent Johnson
- William H. Johnson
- Joshua Johnson
- Lois Mailou Jones
- Jacob Lawrence
- Hughie Lee-Smith
- Edmonia Lewis
- Norman Lewis
- Jules Lion
- Richard Mayhew
- Sam Middleton
- Leo Moss
- Archibald J. Motley, Jr.
- Marion Perkins
- Horace Pippin
- James A. Porter
- Patrick Reason
- John Rhoden
- Gregory Ridley
- William Edouard Scott
- Charles Sebree
- Henry Ossawa Tanner
- Bill Traylor
- Alma W. Thomas
- Dox Thrash
- Laura Wheeler Waring
- Edward Webster
- James Lesesne Wells
- Charles White
- Walter Williams
- Ed Wilson
- Ellis Wilson
- John Wilson
- Hale Woodruff
