= Richard Wyatt Jr. =

American muralist

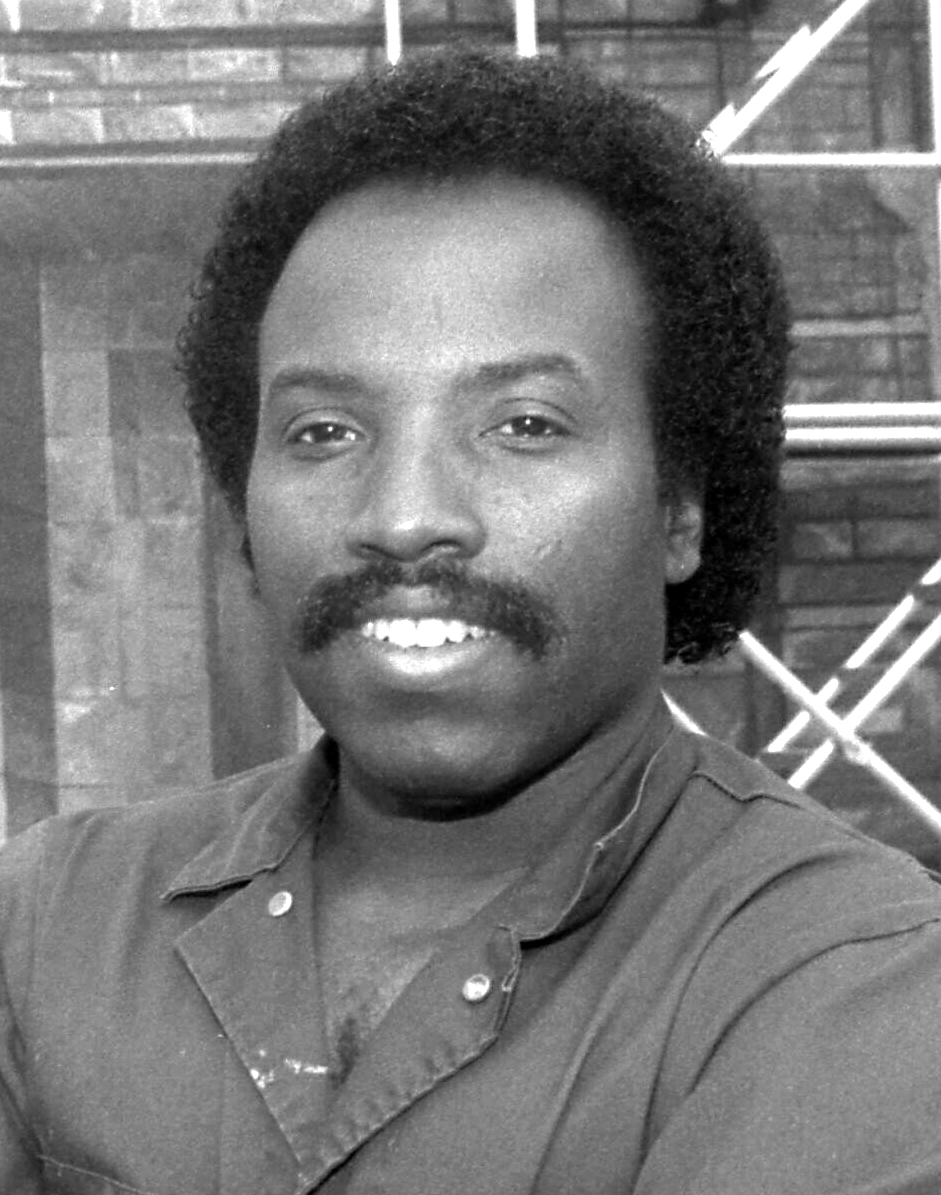
- Wyatt Jr. in 1989
- Born: 7 October 1955; Lynwood, California, U.S.
- Died: 17 May 2024 (aged 68)
- Education: Chouinard Art Institute, UCLA (BFA)
- Known for: Drawing, Painting, Murals
- Notable work: Hollywood Jazz: 1945–1972 mural (1990, 2012)

Richard Wyatt Jr. (October 7, 1955 - May 17, 2024) was a contemporary muralist best known for his public art in and around the city of Los Angeles. His murals can be found at the Watts Towers, the Capitol Records Building, White Memorial Hospital, the Ontario Airport, the Wilshire and Western Metro station, the Union Station East Portal, and many other locations.

== Early life ==
Wyatt was born in Lynwood, California and grew up in Compton before moving to the Crenshaw District in South Los Angeles. Wyatt graduated from Fairfax High School.

He went on to attend the Chouinard Art Institute from 1966 to 1968 and also studied in a Tutor Art Saturday youth program at the Otis Art Institute. It was at Otis that Wyatt met and studied with Charles White, whose work was a major influence on him, and with John Riddle, who helped him improve his technique and encouraged him to address social themes in his art. Wyatt earned his B.F.A. from UCLA in 1978, and by then he had already established contacts in Los Angeles' mural movement.

== Career ==
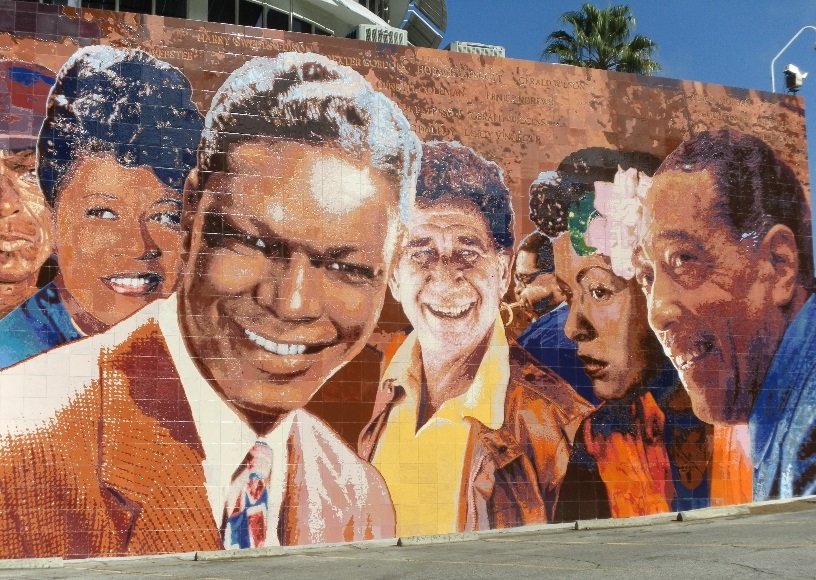
Hollywood Jazz: 1945–1972 at Capitol Records Building, Los Angeles. Restored 2012 in hand-glazed ceramic tile.

Wyatt showed artistic promise from an early age. When he was twelve, he won $200 at the first Watts Chalk-In, a sidewalk art contest sponsored by the Studio Watts Workshop. At thirteen, he participated in an art show at the Los Angeles Bahá’í Center, where he exhibited alongside John Outterbridge, who became a mentor and advocate. Other influential early mentors included Cecil Fergerson and Claude Booker, whom he met through his participation in the Watts Summer Festival. At the age of seventeen, Wyatt was selected to be part of the Los Angeles County Museum of Art's 1972 "Panorama of Black Artists" exhibition, which garnered him widespread recognition and effectively launched his career as a member of the city's African American artistic community.

Wyatt also worked as a teacher and lecturer, assisting John Outterbridge at the Watts Tower Arts Center from 1974–1978, and doing part-time, occasional teaching at the University of California, Irvine and at the Otis Art Institute. From 1989 and to his death in 2024, Wyatt continued to devote himself to his art.
