= Charles Dickson =

Charles Dickson may refer to:

- Charles Dickson (merchant) (1746–1796), merchant, shipbuilder, farmer and politician in Nova Scotia
- Charles Dickson (soldier) (died c. 1784), soldier, land owner and politician in Nova Scotia
- Charles Dickson, Lord Dickson (1850–1922), Scottish Unionist MP and judge
- Charles Rea Dickson (1858–1938), physician, radiologist, electrotherapist, and advocate for the blind in Ontario
- Charles Wedderburn Dickson (1863–1934), member of the Executive Council and Legislative Council of Hong Kong
- Charles Dickson (footballer, born 1871) (1871–1921), Scottish footballer for Newcastle United, see 1894–95 Manchester City F.C. season
- Charlie Dickson (1934–2013), Scottish footballer
- Charles Dickson (artist) (1947), sculptor in Los Angeles
- Charles de Graft Dickson (1913–1997), Ghanaian educationist and politician

== See also ==
- Charles Dickson Archibald (1802–1868), lawyer, businessman and political figure in Nova Scotia
- Charles Dixon (disambiguation)
- Charlie Dixon (disambiguation)
