= Melvino Garretti =

American multidisciplinary artist (born 1946)

- Born: Los Angeles, California, United States

Melvino Garretti (born 1946) is an American multidisciplinary artist who works in ceramics, painting, and performance. His visual works are known for their recognizable abstract motif, which often includes a variety of colorful emblematic shapes, and symbols. He is an original member of the Studio Watts Workshop art collective, and a 1978 MFA graduate of San Francisco Art Institute.

== Early life and education ==
Melvino Garretti was born in Los Angeles. While he was at an early age his family moved to Compton. In 1967, Melvino Garretti joined the nearby Studio Watts Workshop. Although, originally a painter, the workshop introduced him to ceramics through two years of rigorous work at Great Barrington Pottery, the pottery shop of Richard Bennett in the Berkshire Mountains of Massachusetts. There he received lessons in Japanese techniques and philosophy of production, and fired pottery within an authentic wood-burning kiln. After this focus in ceramics, Garretti moved to San Francisco, where he studied as a painter under Julius Hatofsky at San Francisco Art Institute.

== Performance ==
In 1969, Garretti and ten other members of Studio Watts joined with the San Francisco Dancer's Workshop under the direction of Anna Halprin in a dance performance art piece, entitled Ceremony of Us, which took place at the Mark Taper Forum in 1969

== Artistic style ==
Garretti's paintings and ceramic works often include spikes, spiral forms, and jagged edges, to which he applies paints and glazes using a free gestural approach. Garretti also has done several works which contain gestures of human faces in the form of three-dimensional ceramic masks, or two-dimensional contour paintings and drawings of facial profiles.

== Notable press ==
The September 2018 issue of Art Forum magazine's front cover shows a group photo of the Ceremony of Us cast, which includes Melvino Garretti.

The November 2018 issue of Architectural Digest, contains an article about the Santa Monica home of philanthropist and art collector Eileen Harris Norton. A photograph within the article features one of the home's gallery rooms, where a large colorful jar crafted by Melvino Garretti sits on a table, next to a painting by Kerry James Marshall, and a neon work by Glenn Ligon.
