= Daniel and the Towers =

1987 film

- VHS cover
- Directed by: Paul Schneider
- Written by: Stephen Tolkin
- Produced by: Judith James
- Starring: Miguel Alamo; Shawn Harrison; Allan Arbus; Michael McKean
- Cinematography: Tom Hurwitz
- Edited by: Norman Hollyn
- Distributed by: WonderWorks
- Release dates: 1987 (TV); 1992 (VHS)
- Running time: 61 minutes
- Country: United States

Daniel and The Towers is a television film featuring the folk art masterpiece, the Watts Towers, in the Watts neighborhood of Los Angeles. The film was directed by Paul Schneider, and broadcast on PBS's WonderWorks children's anthology television series. It was released on VHS in 1992.

== Plot ==
The movie was made by Wonderworks, a PBS family series, and tells the story of Rodia and Daniel, a delinquent neighborhood boy who learns valuable lessons from Rodia. The film is part true and part fiction. The pair come to know each other after Rodia discovers that Daniel had been using Rodia's ceramic pots for target practice. Daniel agrees to stop destroying the pots, and instead, agrees to collect more junk for him to build the towers, while Rodia agrees to fix a neighbor's window that Daniel had broken.

== Cast ==
- Miguel Alamo – Daniel Guerra
- Shawn Harrison – Sean
- Jimmy Yung – Liko
- Allan Arbus – Simon 'Sam' Rodia
- Montrose Hagins – Hellen Littlefield
- Carmen Zapata – Consuelo Guerra
- Beulah Quo – Lynn Chow
- Michael McKean – Wexler Hatch
- Liam Sullivan – Commissioner
- Janice McElroy – Miss Williams
- Mary Lowitt – Customer At Store
- Steven Camarillo – Rude Vacho 1
- Telly Bilbrew – Rude Vacho 2
- Anthony James Guttierrez – Rude Vacho 3
- John Outterbridge – Postman
- Tom Noble – Commissioner's Assistant

== Background ==
Sam Rodia spent 33 years single-handedly creating the Watts Towers. He built the towers without any scaffolds, cranes or any hired help. He was also known as Simon Rodia, and inexplicably disappeared in 1954. He was later discovered to be living in a rooming house, and he died in a hospital in 1965. He never returned to the towers after building them.

The script was based on an UCLA doctoral thesis, research and imagination. During their research, the producers discovered that Rodia was a "cantankerous guy", who had a habit of yelling at people. The working title was "Ask Columbus", because of Rodia's fascination with Christopher Columbus, but they finally settled on Daniel and the Towers "to convey the program's theme more clearly and make a more direct reference to the story's unique setting".

== Awards ==
The movie was nominated by the Young Artist Awards in 1988 as "Best Television Family Special, Movie of the Week or Variety Show" and Miguel Alamo was nominated for "Best Young Actor Starring in a Television Drama Special, Movie of the Week or Variety Show".
