= Charles Dixon =

Charles Dixon may refer to:

- Charles Dixon (artist) (1872–1934), British maritime artist
- Charles P. Dixon (1873–1939), English tennis player
- Charles Dixon (ornithologist) (1858–1926), English ornithologist
- Charles Dixon (judge) (died 1817), British judge and politician
- Charles Dixon (bodybuilder), American professional bodybuilder
- Chuck Dixon (born 1954), American comic-book author
- Charles Harvey Dixon (1862–1923), British politician
- Chicka Dixon (Charles Dixon, 1928–2010), Aboriginal Australian activist

== See also ==
- Charlie Dixon (disambiguation)
- Charles Dickson (disambiguation)
