= Black Arts Council =

U.S. arts organization

The Black Arts Council (BAC) was an arts organization located in Los Angeles and founded in 1968, to advocate for African-American artists and support their community. Founded by Cecil Fergerson and Claude Booker (black art preparators who worked at the Los Angeles County Museum of Art, or LACMA), the organization comprised African-American artists, staff members, and other city residents who aimed to promote African-American art in Los Angeles. When the Black Arts Council was founded in 1968, every LACMA board member was white.

The organization grew to over 1,000 members in two years. It not only pressured LACMA to organize exhibitions for African-American artists, but also did extensive work supporting artists outside the museum. The BAC organized student field trips to art exhibits, gave lectures at schools, and curated art exhibitions at various community locations and events.

The BAC's advocacy produced results in the form of two LACMA exhibitions: Three Graphic Artists: Charles White, David Hammons, and Timothy Washington in 1971, and Panorama in 1972, featuring Noah Purifoy, John Outterbridge, and Betye Saar. These exhibits paved the path for LACMA's 1976 exhibition Two Centuries of Black American Art, which traveled to the High Museum of Art in Atlanta, the Dallas Museum of Fine Arts, and the Brooklyn Museum.

The BAC ceased activities in 1974 following Booker's death.
