= Fergerson =

Fergerson is a surname. Notable people with the surname include:

- Cecil Fergerson (1931–2013), African-American art curator and community activist
- Duke Fergerson (born 1954), American football player
- Mable Fergerson (born 1955), American athlete
