= Mitchell's Point Looking Down the Columbia =

1887 painting by Grafton Tyler Brown

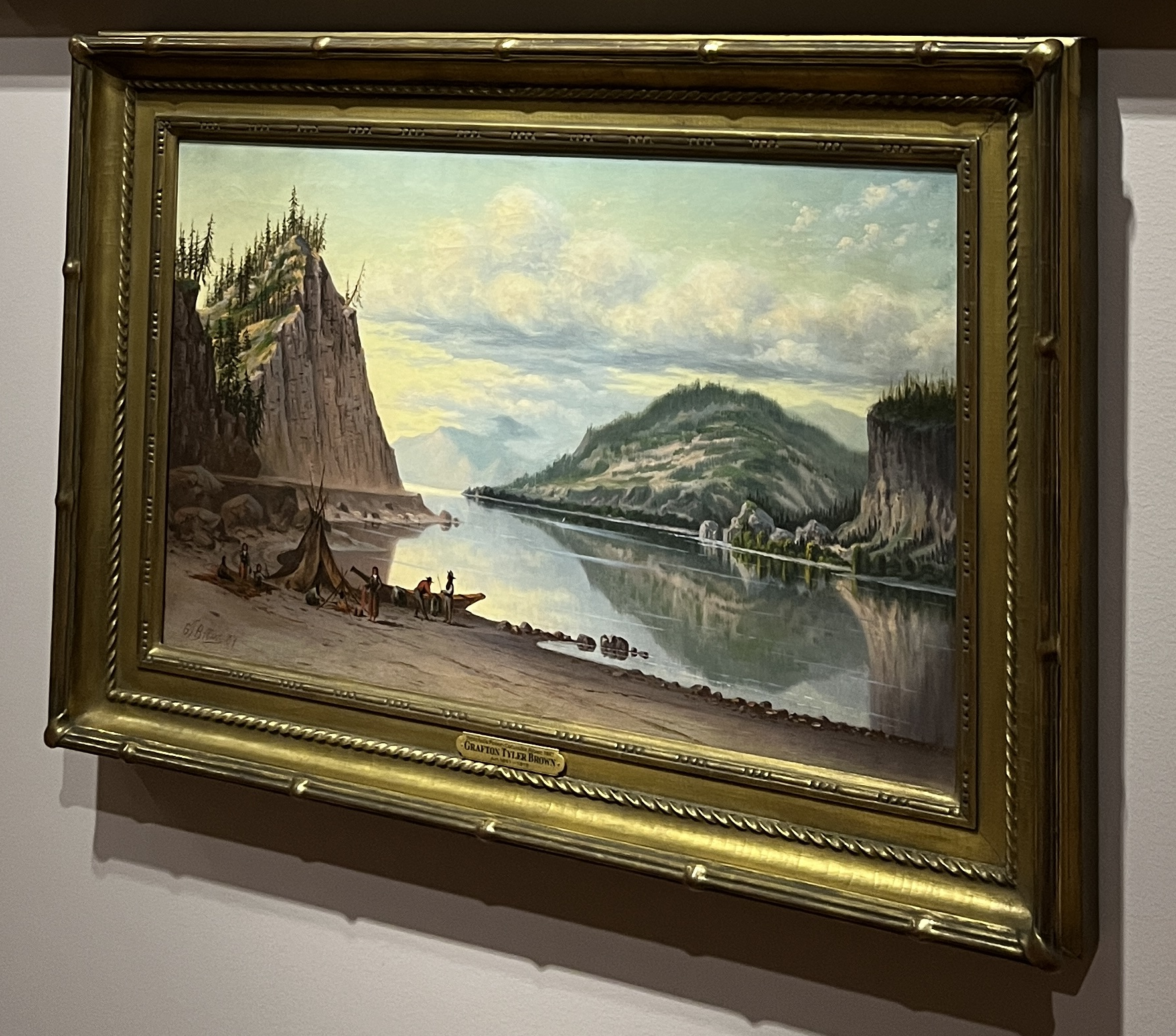
- The painting at the Seattle Art Museum in 2023
- Artist: Grafton Tyler Brown

Mitchell's Point Looking Down the Columbia is an 1887 painting by Grafton Tyler Brown. The artwork was part of an auction in 2020. It is part of the collection of the Seattle Art Museum.
