= Rick Oginz =

American visual artist (born 1944)

Rick Oginz (born 1944) is an American visual artist born in Philadelphia. Oginz started making sculpture at 16, working parallel to his traditional high school at the Corcoron Institute, then moved on to Tyler College of Art and Design at Temple University, working as the ceramics assistant to Professor Rudolph Staffel. Continuing at the University of Wisconsin, he studied with British sculptor, Hubert Dalwood. Graduating in 1968 with an MFA, Oginz was offered the opportunity by Dalwood to teach part-time at Hornsey College of Art and Design in London.

During this time his work focused on the contemporary minimalist school, using steel and wood in precise ways, trying to achieve an industrial aesthetic. Oginz's pieces were installations that depicted a continuity of space and scale without the ridgity of the edge, or boundary. In an exhibition at Serpentine Gallery, in Hyde Park, a rectangular shape was described by its content of random vectors ending at the imaginary plane of the rectangle. This piece was a few feet high inside the gallery and got progressively larger as it moved through a glass wall and continued out into Hyde Park, where it ended at a 10-foot height. Though it embraced the minimalist aesthetic, Oginz's inspiration came from notions of quantum physics—that vectors made of wood were describing the scale and shape, as opposed to its contours. This piece is an example of a turning point in Oginz's artistic practice—a shift from minimalism to a focus on the philosophy of science.

The Serpentine exhibition lead to a post-graduate fellowship at the University of Leeds, called the Gregory Fellowship, where his work made another radical change—from abstract to figurative. Here, Oginz found his ideas concerned with scientific thinking, needed a more literal expression. He retrained himself in traditional sculpture technique in rendering the human figure. After 8 years of living in England, partly in Leeds, partly in London, Oginz came to identify strongly with Los Angeles, a city devoted to individual expression and fantasy. The great piece of folk art, called the "Watts Towers," captivated Oginz's imagination and, in 1976, he moved to Los Angeles. This is where drawing became central to his practice, focusing on depicting the juxtaposition between the inner-workings of his studio and the outer-workings of the city. Windows became a metaphor for mental imagery contrasted with the external environment. This was a comparative study between subjective and objective. These early years in Los Angeles, in spite of full-time teaching, were the most successful for Oginz, with exhibitions and representation in three different commercial galleries and a major award and survey exhibition at Los Angeles County Museum of Art. Some of the characteristics of his later work in Los Angeles concern a hypothetical archeological view of our current culture, so dependent on combustion, and the Heisenberg principle as applied to "the Weatherman" and global warming. Depicting the history-changing catastrophe of 9/11 was an important part of Oginz's work.

After 30 years in Los Angeles, Oginz resettled in Toronto, where he has been working almost exclusively in his studio for the past 5 years, with a short stint teaching at Seneca College. This current period of work is characterized by an ongoing interest in biology, neurology, particle physics, and the possibilities within current genetic research. Oginz's work discusses the theme of visualizing some of the crucial historical events of our lifetimes: seeing the earth from space, organ transplantation, the separation of the individual from the information of that individual, the vulnerability of contemporary society to fundamental religious belief, and the understanding and manipulation of the basis of genetic difference.
