= Doug Webb =

American jazz saxophonist (born 1960)

- Born: 1960 (age 64–65); Chicago, Illinois, U.S.
- Origin: Huntington Beach, California, U.S.
- Genres: Jazz
- Instruments: Saxophone

Doug Webb (born 1960) is an American jazz saxophonist.

== Early life and education ==
Born in Chicago, Webb moved to California with his family at the age of three. He graduated from Edison High School in Huntington Beach, California. Webb received his Bachelor of Music from Berklee College of Music. He began playing the clarinet at the age of eight, adding the saxophone and flute by age 15.

== Music career ==
Webb has played and recorded with Horace Silver, Freddie Hubbard, Stanley Clarke, Mat Marucci, Kyle Eastwood, Billy Childs, Rod Stewart, Carly Simon, Art Davis and Jon Gibson. He played with the house band for Dennis Miller's television show, and toured with the Doc Severinsen band. Webb has been featured on over 150 jazz recordings, including twenty under his own name, or as co-leader for Posi-Tone Records.

Webb has also recorded music for movies and television programs, including Lisa Simpson's saxophone performances in The Simpsons. He recorded music for The Dogwalker, I Build the Tower, Father of Invention and Minions. He was credited as a saxophone consultant for Rules Don't Apply.

== Personal life ==
Webb most recently lived in Los Angeles, with his wife Alex.

== Discography ==
- Ulterior Motif (1998) – with Mat Marucci (Jazz Inspiration)
- Last Trane to Georgia (2002) (Azica/Posi-Tone)
- Genesis (2003) – with the Mat Marucci-Markus Burger Ensemble Sounds (Cadence Jazz)
- 3 The Hard Way (2006) – with Mat Marucci (CIMP)
- Change-Up (2007) – with Mat Marucci (CIMP)
- No Lesser Evil (2007) – with Mat Marucci (Cadence Jazz)
- Avenue of the Americas (2008) – with David Haney & Mat Marucci (CIMP)
- Warm Feelings (2009) – with Fabio Jegher (Getty)
- Partners in Crime (2009) – with Mat Marucci (Cadence Jazz) (recorded 2004)
- Midnight (2010) (Posi-Tone)
- Renovations (2011) (Posi-Tone)
- Swing Shift (2011) (Posi-Tone)
- Another Scene (2013) (Posi-Tone)
- Triple Play (2015) (Posi-Tone) (recorded 2014)
- Back East (2015) (Posi-Tone)
- Home for Christmas (2015) (Rhombus)
- Bright Side (2016) (Posi-Tone)
- Why Not (2016) – with Mat Marucci (Cadence Jazz) (recorded 2011)
- Sets the Standard (2016) – with Alan Broadbent (V.S.O.P.) (recorded 2014)
- Ileana (2017) – with Fabio Jegher (Fermenti Vivi)
- Fast Friends (2018) (Posi-Tone)
- Doug Webb in Holland (2019) – with Eric Ineke & Marius Beets (Daybreak/Challenge)
- Apples and Oranges (2020) (Posi-Tone) (recorded 2018)
