= Joy Ride (1958 film) =

1958 film

- Theatrical release poster
- Directed by: Edward Bernds
- Screenplay by: Christopher Knopf
- Based on: Joy Ride by C.B. Gilford
- Produced by: Ben Schwalb
- Starring: Regis Toomey; Ann Doran; James Westmoreland; Nicholas King; James Bridges; Robert Levin
- Cinematography: Carl E. Guthrie
- Edited by: William Austin
- Music by: Marlin Skiles
- Production company: Allied Artists Pictures
- Distributed by: Allied Artists Pictures
- Release date: November 23, 1958
- Running time: 65 minutes
- Country: United States
- Language: English

Joy Ride is a 1958 American crime film directed by Edward Bernds and written by Christopher Knopf. The film stars Regis Toomey, Ann Doran, James Westmoreland, Nicholas King, James Bridges and Robert Levin. The film was released on November 23, 1958, by Allied Artists Pictures.

== Plot ==
Miles and Grace live in a comfortable home. One evening their quiet existence is disturbed by a group of young hoodlums who stop to admire Miles' Thunderbird. Typically bored teenagers, they decide, with potentially violent Paul leading the gang, to attempt to get Miles' permission to take a ride in the car. Miles gets the police involved, and at first they see it as just an idle threat, but then they smash his window with a note, telephone the house in the middle of the night, and finally, after getting squad cars to patrol his driveway whenever the Thunderbird is there, they terrorize Grace to try to get the duplicate set of keys. In the hospital where Grace recovers from a concussion, Miles promises her that they will get the car. He tells them, when they call the hospital after tracking him down all day, that they can have it. He suggests a place and time, and he waits for them with a loaded gun; now in control, he directs them to drive at 120 miles an hour on a freeway. Paul is frightened now. Finally he has them pulled over and turns them in to the police.

== Cast ==
- Regis Toomey as Miles
- Ann Doran as Grace
- James Westmoreland as Paul
- Nicholas King as Arnie
- James Bridges as Dirk
- Robert Levin as Vince
- Roy Engel as Barrett
- Robert Colbert as Taverner
- Robert Anderson as Ellensten
- Chris Alcaide as Stewart
- Stacy Keach Sr. as Wechsler
