= Charlie Dixon =

Charlie Dixon may refer to:

- Charlie Dixon (musician) (1898–1940), jazz banjoist
- Charlie Dixon (English footballer, born 1891) (1891 – after 1926), Darlington, Middlesbrough and Hartlepool full back
- Charlie Dixon (English footballer, born 1903) (1903–1983), Bournemouth, Southport and Nelson centre half
- Charlie Dixon (Australian footballer) (born 1990)

== See also ==
- Charley Dixon, fictional character in Terminator
- Charles Dixon (disambiguation)
