= Mat Marucci =

American jazz musician

- Born: Mathew Roger Marucci III; July 2, 1945 (age 81); Rome, New York, U.S.
- Education: Cayuga Community College; Sacramento City College
- Occupations: Jazz drummer, composer
- Spouse: Diane (m. 1982)
- Children: 2

Mathew Roger Marucci III (born July 2, 1945) is an American jazz drummer, composer, author, educator and clinician. He has numerous critically acclaimed recordings as leader, and his performing credits include: Jimmy Smith, Kenny Burrell, James Moody, Eddie Harris, Buddy DeFranco, Les McCann, Pharoah Sanders, John Tchicai and others.

== Early life and education ==
Marucci was born in Rome, New York, into a musical family with professional histories on both sides. His sister, Mena Marucci Colella, was a concert pianist. His brother, Ed Marucci, was a professional trumpeter. Marucci was classically trained on the piano and switched to drums at the age of 19.

After graduating high school from St. Aloysius Academy in 1963, Marucci studied drums with Dick Howard in Auburn, New York, from 1964 to 1965. At Auburn Community College, he received a degree in business management in 1965. Marucci relocated to the west coast in 1969. Attending Sacramento City College, he received his associate degree in music, in 1973.

Marucci has lived between New York City, Los Angeles and Sacramento since attending college.

== Professional career ==
In addition to recording and performing, Marucci has authored several books on drumming for both Ashley Publications and Mel Bay Publications. His recordings and books have garnered four and five star reviews in JazzTimes, Jazziz, Modern Drummer, DownBeat and DRUM! magazines.

Additionally, Marucci has written numerous articles on drumming for Modern Drummer and Downbeat magazines, and for the Percussive Arts Society's Percussive Notes. He has also written articles for several prominent jazz websites including AllAboutJazz.com.

Contributing to jazz education, Marucci has been an adjunct professor in the Los Rios Community College District in the Sacramento area. He was also an applied music instructor at American River College in Sacramento, California, and at the Jazzschool in Berkeley, California, and an applied drum set instructor at the Sacramento Traditional Jazz Society.

== Personal life ==
Marucci married Diane in 1982. They have a son, Mathew Roger IV (born 1986), who is a semi-professional drummer. Their daughter, Therese Renee (born 1989), is an amateur pianist and flutist.

== Discography ==
=== As leader ===
- Who Do Voodoo (1979) (Marco)
- Lifeline (1980) (Marco)
- Festival (1980) (Marco)
- Extensity (1981) (Marco)
- Avant-Bop (1983) (Tudor)
- Body and Soul (1992) (Timeless)
- Ulterior Motif (1998) (Jazz Inspiration)
- Genesis (2003) – with Marcus Burger (Cadence Jazz)
- 3 the Hard Way (2006) – with Doug Webb (CIMP)
- Change-Up (2007) – with Doug Webb (CIMP)
- No Lesser Evil (2007) – with Doug Webb (Cadence Jazz)
- Partners In Crime (2009) – with Doug Webb (Cadence Jazz)
- Live at the Jazz Bakery (2010) (Marco)
- Why Not, with Doug Webb (2011) (Cadence Jazz)
- Live at Jazz Central (2013) (CIMP)
- Infinitesimal Flash Quartet Live! (2017) – co-leader with John Tchicai (Cadence Jazz)
- Inversions (2018) (CIMP)

=== As sideman ===
- Dreamworld (1991) – John Allen (Digital Futures)
- Infinitesimal Flash (2000) – John Tchicai (Challenge/Buzz)
- Daybreak (2001) – Jimmy Smith (West Wind)
- Nice 'N' Easy (2007) – Valerie V (CDL)
- Avenue of the Americas (2008) – David Haney (CIMP)
- Live from Yoshi's (2009) – David Haney (Cadence Jazz)
- Invitation to a Song (2009) – Bruce Kelly (Markane)
- Live from Jazz Central (2015) – David Haney (CIMP)

== Bibliography ==
=== Ashley Publications ===
- Progressive Studies for Drums (1971)
- Progressive Studies in Jazz Drumming (1972)

=== Dorn Publications ===
- The 15-Minute Keep-in-Shape Workout (with CD) for Sticks & Mallets magazine (1998)

=== Mel Bay Publications ===
- 15-Minute Warm-Ups for Drums (2000)
- A Simple Approach to the Drum Rudiments (2003)
- Drumstick Finger Systems and Techniques (2003)
- Drumming Facts, Tips & Warm-Ups (2005)
- Jazz Drumming Essentials and More (2010)
- Essential Snare Drum Exercises (2018)
- Mastering The Snare Drum (2018)
- "Basic Coordination For The Drum Set" (2026)
