= Studio Watts Workshop =

Arts organization based in Los Angeles, California, US

The Studio Watts Workshop was an arts organization founded in 1964 and based in the Watts neighborhood of Los Angeles, dedicated to providing working space for artists and offering a broad range of arts workshops for the local community.

== History ==
The principal organizers of the Studio Watts Workshop were jazz musician Jayne Cortez and accountant and arts patron James Woods. Woods, who worked at a local savings and loan, and his wife Margo Woods, a probation officer, provided the funding for the workshop's initial operating costs, because of their conviction that art could be a tool for social change. Woods found a location for the workshop, renting an empty furniture outlet on 104th Street and Grandee Avenue, and called together a group of eight artists to begin to plan what would become the Studio Watts Workshop. After the Watts riots led to renewed attention on the neighborhood, there were new opportunities for support and donations that led to the group being able to provide training for about 150 students in the visual arts, writing, drama, dance, and music.

In order to work in the Studio Watts Workshop space, artists had to agree to give public exhibitions of their work at least two times a year in Watts and in an artistic space outside the area and also to provide free instruction to any student with, in the words of James Woods, "the initiative and the desire to participate in the creative arts." Some of the early 'masters' to students were sculptor Guy Miller; Bruce Strobridge, a painter and sculptor who also had previously served in the Army with Woods; and Anna Halprin, renowned international dance performer and teacher. A more detailed narrative on the Woods-Halprin collaboration can be found in Robby Herbst's April 2014 article "Ceremony of Us" published in East of Borneo, the Cal Arts School of Art's online magazine of LA contemporary arts. Bill Cosby and celebrated dance performers Marge & Gower Champion were also early supporters. Woods also produced and directed several plays (many original) at the Studio with student actors, to some acclaim. The celebrated poet Wanda Coleman, later known as the "Unofficial Poet Laureate of LA" was deeply engaged with early literary efforts among students at Studio Watts. In the late 1960s the Ford Foundation provided program funding to Woods and the Studio for its diverse initiatives. This was complemented by significant funding from the Doris Duke Foundation. Many Los Angeles professionals were friends of Studio Watts Workshop and donated their time and services to its governance. Others, such as John Blaine, worked as full-time Studio Watts staff. In the early years, UCLA management professor Will Mc Whinney worked with Woods on strategy and leadership issues and LA native Joel Fadem, then a Yale University grad student and later at UCLA, assisted Woods in many foundation fund raising efforts.

In 1971, the Studio Watts Workshop received a $75,000 Ford Foundation grant to study how the arts could be used in low-income housing projects and Woods used the grant, together with a grant from the Department of Housing and Urban Development and from other donations, to construct a 144-unit complex of rent-subsidized apartments. The Studio Watts Workshop became the Watts Community Housing Corporation, and spaces were set aside for arts workshops and gallery. Beginning in the 1970s, federal arts funding was drastically reduced and the Watts Community Housing Corporation could no longer support arts activity. In 1992, Woods, who was on the board of the Watts Community Housing Corporation, was continuing his efforts to advocate with the Department of Housing and Urban Development for allocating a part of the complex's rent income for arts programming.

== Programs ==
One of the studio's best-known projects was an annual Chalk-In, first held in 1968 as a way to encourage community participation in the arts. Young people were invited to draw on a block-long section of sidewalk on 103rd Street. Twelve-year-old Richard Wyatt won the top prize at the first Chalk-In and credits the experience for starting him on his career as a prominent Los Angeles muralist. Other Studio efforts to integrate the arts into the Watts community included design programs, media production classes and facilities, a folk art archive, and dance, theater and other arts productions.

Because of Woods' active involvement in the Watts arts community, in 1968 he was invited by the Los Angeles Music Center to organize the first Los Angeles Festival of the Performing Arts. Even while moonlighting as a doorman at a Hollywood jazz club (Shelly's Manne-Hole), he would go on to organize the second and third festivals (in 1969 and 1970), and artists affiliated with the Studio Watts Workshop were among the participants. During the period when Studio Watts transitioned into low cost housing with artists-in-residence as a component, Woods also was instrumental in organizing "The Meeting at Watts Towers," a venue attracting both the new and old of the Watts community to honor its past, raise awareness on current issues, and celebrate the future. A comprehensive review of community arts in Watts may be found in "Watts: Art and Social Change in Los Angeles, 1965-2002" the 2003 exhibition catalogue of Marquette University's Haggerty Museum of Art, curated by Director, Curtis Carter (complete 68-page catalogue available on line).

== See also ==
- Melvino Garretti
- Ceremony of Us
