= Nicholas King =

American actor (1933–2012)

Nicholas King (March 21, 1933 – April 3, 2012) was an American actor and horticulturist who was instrumental in preserving the Watts Towers.

Robert Nicholas King was born in Sacramento, California. After graduating from high school in 1951, King began taking acting lessons at the Pasadena Playhouse.

King had uncredited roles in The Long, Hot Summer and as a medic in The Young Lions. He had the role of Arnie in 1958's Joy Ride and Georgie in The Threat. He also had a recurring role in the television version of the NBC soap opera One Man's Family.

In 1969 King returned to Northern California, where he became a partner in a land cooperative on the Garcia River in Point Arena. He opened a nursery and began grafting varieties of apple trees.

King died in a Santa Rosa, California nursing home. He had battled Lewy body dementia for several years prior to his death.

== Watts Towers preservation ==
In the late 1950s, King was working as an assistant to Hollywood photographer Bob Willoughby. King was present when Willoughby's friend, film editor William Cartwright, told the photographer about first seeing the towers and wondering why they had been abandoned. King expressed an interest in working with Cartwright to save the towers, and the two men traced ownership to Joseph Montoya, an employee of a local dairy.

King and Cartwright arranged a meeting with Montoya and asked if he would be interested in selling the towers. Montoya said "yes" and set a price of $3,000.

"We wrote out a $20 check for the deposit right there, and we walked out of that building 15 feet off the ground. We couldn't get over it — we owned those damned things," King told The New Yorker in a 1965 interview.

"Nick ... understood the international merit of the towers," said Jeanne Morgan, a charter member of the Committee for Simon Rodia's Towers in Watts. "Without his participation, the towers would have been destroyed" under a demolition order issued by the City of Los Angeles after they had been declared a potential safety hazard.
