= William Cartwright (film editor) =

American documentary editor and filmmaker

- Born: William Tilton Cartwright; August 25, 1920; St. Louis, Missouri, U.S.
- Died: June 1, 2013 (aged 92); North Hills, California, U.S.
- Occupation: Film Editor
- Years active: 1963-2007

William T. "Bill" Cartwright Sr. (born August 25, 1920 St. Louis, Missouri; died June 1, 2013 North Hills, California) was an American television and film director, producer and editor responsible for a number of documentaries. He was nominated for 5 Emmys Emmy Awards in 1978 and 1997 and won three. He edited "Maya Lin: A Strong Clear Vision" which won an Oscar. He also has many credits for direction and producing. His son William T. Cartwright Jr. is also an editor and is credited with some of the titles listed below.

Cartwright was also known for helping save the Watts Towers in association with Nicholas King.

Cartwright died in hospice care on June 1, 2013. He was 92.

== Filmography ==
- Man Ray: Prophet of the Avant Garde (1997) (TV)
- Don't Pave Main Street: Carmel's Heritage (1994)
- Maya Lin: A Strong Clear Vision (1994)
- Oscar Presents: The War Movies and John Wayne (1977) (TV)
- It Was a Very Good Year (1971) TV Series
- The Bridge at Remagen (1969)
- The Rise and Fall of the Third Reich (1968)
- The Devil's Brigade (1968)
- China: Roots of Madness (1966) (TV)
- Time-Life Specials: The March of Time (1965) (TV)
- Four Days in November (1964)
- The Making of the President 1960 (1963) (TV)
