= I Build the Tower =

- Directed by: Edward Landler and Brad Byer
- Written by: Edward Landler and Brad Byer
- Produced by: Edward Landler and Brad Byer
- Edited by: Glen P. Rose and Edward Landler
- Music by: Giuseppe Verdi (arranged by Robert Israel, Nate Morgan and Michael Abels)
- Release date: 2006
- Running time: 87 minutes
- Country: United States
- Language: English

I Build the Tower is an American feature-length documentary film depicting the life of Sabato Rodia, also known as Sam Rodia and Simon Rodia, the Italian immigrant who created the Watts Towers in South Los Angeles.

== Production ==
Completed in 2006, I Build the Tower was directed, written and produced by Edward Landler and Brad Byer. The project was initiated by Byer's research into the life of Rodia, his great-uncle. With exclusive access to his family materials, Byer teamed up with independent filmmaker Edward Landler who had been working with the Watts community groups for several years.

They started the production by filming the last recorded interview with architect, designer and futurist Buckminster Fuller, three months before his death in 1983. Hailing Rodia as "one of the greatest sculptors of the twentieth century", Fuller analyzed Rodia's understanding of aesthetics and natural engineering principles.

The filmmakers went on to shoot their film throughout Los Angeles, the San Francisco Bay area and southern Italy, and managed to sustain the vitality of their work while waiting years for the Los Angeles Cultural Affairs Department to remove the scaffolding erected for the restoration of the towers.

The narrative of the documentary is drawn from audio interviews of Rodia recorded in the early 1960s. In his own words and voice, Rodia himself chronicles his redemption from alcoholism and despair to a fierce determination to build "something big." The story was filled out by recent interviews with relatives, neighbors and other witnesses who have come into close contact with the Watts Towers, including artist John Outterbridge and historian Mike Davis. Phil Proctor of the Firesign Theater, who gives voice to historic trial proceedings involving Rodia.

The film's musical score is based on the opera arias of Giuseppe Verdi – the music Rodia loved – and spans the time and distance from nineteenth century Italy to present-day Los Angeles. The classical score was arranged and conducted by silent film music composer Robert Israel. Jazz pianist Nate Morgan composed an original jazz score using Verdi's themes and performed by Morgan's ensemble. Filmmakers Byer and Landler conceived a hip-hop song incorporating Rodia's own voice as lead vocal, backed up by jazz vocalists Dwight Trible and Logan Johnson Jr., set to music by Michael Abels.

In April, 2009, I Build the Tower was the opening presentation of "Art and Migration: Sabato Rodia's Watts Towers in Los Angeles," the first international conference on the Watts Towers. The conference was held in Genoa, Italy, sponsored by the University of Genoa and the U.C.L.A. International Institute.

== Reception ==
I Build the Tower has been praised by documentary filmmaker Ken Burns as "wonderful, lyrical and compelling", and by film critic Leonard Maltin as "heartfelt and fascinating... a real discovery".

Robert Koehler wrote in Variety that it is the most complete visual account of Rodia and the history of his towers.
