= Ceremony of Us =

Ceremony Of Us was an interracial dance encounter between the Studio Watts Workshop, an African American arts organization, and the San Francisco Dancer's Workshop, Anna Halprin's dance company. The performance took place at the Mark Taper Forum, a venue of the Los Angeles Music Center, on February 27, 1969.

The work was commissioned as a part of the Second Los Angeles Festival of the Performing Arts, a festival organized by Studio Watts director James M. Woods in coordination with the Music Center. Additional events for the festival involved jazz performances at Shelley's Manhole jazz club by Studio Watts master teachers John Carter and Bobby Bradford, as well as a poetry reading by Watts Studio fellow and Ceremony of Us dancer Wanda Coleman.

The performances developed from a series of workshops Halprin facilitated with the two companies. To begin with in late 1968 Halprin worked with the two companies separately, developing a movement vocabulary specific for an all-white (San Francisco Dancer's Workshop) and an all-African American dance company (Studio Watts Dancer's Workshop). Then in January 1969 the two troupes were brought together for a ten-day joint rehearsal in Los Angeles. This initial encounter is documented in the performance film Right On/Ceremony of Us. The Taper Performance involved the performance of a birthing ritual as well as the spontaneous selection of game-like dance scores.

Halprin biographer Janice Ross notes that the experience led her to question the racial make up of her dance company and to develop, through the National Endowment For the Arts, a multi-ethnic dance education program titled Reach Out.
