= Charlie Dixon (English footballer, born 1891) =

English footballer

Personal information
- Full name: Charles Dixon
- Date of birth: 22 July 1891
- Place of birth: Sacriston, County Durham, England
- Height: 5 ft 8 in (1.73 m)
- Position: Full back

Senior career*
Years	Team	Apps	(Gls)
1912–1915	Darlington		(0)
1919–1922	Middlesbrough	12	(0)
1922–1926	Hartlepools United	66	(0)
- * Club domestic league appearances and goals

Charles Dixon (22 July 1891 – after 1926) was an English footballer who played as a full back. He was a regular for North-Eastern League club Darlington before the First World War, and appeared in the Football League for Middlesbrough and Hartlepools United after it.
