= Leo Moss =

Leo Moss (-1936) was an African-American handyman and doll maker of the late nineteenth and early twentieth century.

== Leo Moss dolls ==
Investigations in 2014 showed that Moss built up the doll heads using papier mâché on existing commercial composition doll heads. The heads were based on family, friends, and members of the community. They are classified as "character dolls" because they express emotion, and have realistic facial features. It is estimated that as few as 50 survive. The majority of his dolls were Black, but he also made some White dolls. At least one of Moss's dolls has his initials "L M" carved on the nape of the neck, on the layer outside the commercial composite base. Some had the owner’s name and a date stitched on their torso - Steve Eilenberg posits this is the completion date.

Steva Roark Allgood wrote in Doll News:

Moss traded [dolls] for chickens and vegetables to feed his family… The dolls were made from paper scraped from walls, boiled and made into a paste. Each head was molded individually and colored with a spray gun used for killing flies. Boot dye and stove blacking were used as the base color. The glass eyes were brown and inset into the heads. However, a few had painted eyes. Their hair was molded and their nostrils were usually pierced. Bodies were cloth with legs and arms mostly composition. The bodies were made by Lee Ann Moss, Leo’s wife, and some were from broken dolls they had been given… Another source of doll parts was from a toy supplier (a white man from New York) who sold seconds, or defective parts, to Moss. It is said that later this salesman ran off with Lee Ann taking the youngest child, Mina, with them. Henceforth, the dolls had tears on their faces, always appeared very sad and dejected, and reflected the unhappiness he felt over this tragic event

— Steva Roark Allgood (1987). "To Leo Moss with Love". Doll News (Fall). United Federation of Doll Clubs.

== List of dolls ==
- "Man" - a Black man with a grey beard and hair wearing a fabric blue suit, bow tie, white collar and papier mâché yellow shirt. Myla Perkins posits that the doll is of Moss. Right leg contains a rolled paper. In the collection of Debbie Neff. c. 50cm
- "Crying Baby" - A Black baby doll in a white dress with a red undershirt. Original owner Mabel Lincoln, 1922. Has a voice box. In the collection of Debbie Neff.
- "Crying Toddler" - A Black toddler doll. Original owner Violet May Collins. In the collection of Debbie Neff. c. 70-80cm
- "Baby Moss" - a Black baby doll. Bought from the Moss Family by collector Betty Formaz, later belonging to Myla Perkins. Currently in the collection of the National Museum of Toys / Miniatures.

== Moss dolls in the twenty-first century ==
A number of Moss dolls from the collection of Deborah Neff were on display at the Mingei International Museum in San Diego in 2015.
