= Cecil Fergerson =

American art curator and activist (1931–2013)

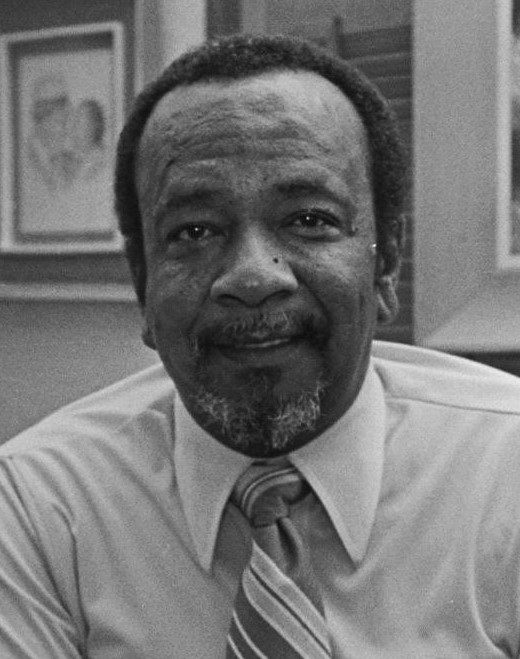
- Fergerson in 1983
- Born: July 6, 1931; Boley, Oklahoma, U.S.
- Died: 18 September 2013 (aged 82); Los Angeles, California, U.S.
- Occupations: Museum curator, community activist
- Spouse: Miriam Fergerson

Cecil Fergerson (July 6, 1931 – September 18, 2013) was an African-American art curator and community activist. He is widely credited with fostering African-American and Latin-American art communities in Los Angeles for more than 50 years, and was named a "Living Cultural Treasure" by the city in 1999. While working at the Los Angeles County Museum of Art (LACMA), Fergerson co-founded the Black Arts Council (BAC) to advocate for African-American artists and support their community. His advocacy at LACMA and BAC led to seminal exhibitions of African-American art in the early 1970s.

== Background and education ==
Fergerson was born outside the small town of Boley, Oklahoma, in 1931; his parents moving with him to Los Angeles in 1938. He graduated from Jordan High School in Watts, and studied at Compton Community College.

== Los Angeles County museums ==
Fergerson started working in the L.A. County Museum system as a custodian at the Natural History Museum in 1948. By 1953, his position was elevated to museum helper, where he worked moving exhibits and installing artwork. An exhibit of French Expressionist paintings sparked his interest in art, and Fergerson began attending art lectures and reading extensively.

By 1968, Fergerson continued to rise through the museum system, becoming an art preparator for LACMA, and began advocating for the inclusion of African-American artists in the museum's exhibitions. That year, Fergerson teamed with colleague Claude Booker to form the Black Arts Council, which grew to more than 1,000 members in two years. The BAC not only pressured LACMA to organize exhibitions for African-American artists, but also did extensive work supporting artists outside the museum. The BAC organized student field trips to art exhibits, gave lectures at schools, and curated art exhibitions at various community locations and events.

Fergerson and Booker's work through the BAC began to produce results, namely in the form of two LACMA exhibitions: Three Graphic Artists: Charles White, David Hammons, and Timothy Washington in 1971, and Panorama in 1972, featuring Noah Purifoy, John Outterbridge, and Betye Saar. These shows paved the path for LACMA's 1976 exhibition Two Centuries of Black American Art, which traveled to the High Museum of Art in Atlanta, the Dallas Museum of Fine Arts, and the Brooklyn Museum. The BAC ceased activities in 1974 following the death of Booker.

== Post-LACMA career ==
After retiring from LACMA in 1985, Fergerson curated exhibits of African-American and Latin-American art across Los Angeles, often in community settings such as schools, churches, malls, gyms, and even prisons. Fergerson ran the Watts Summer Festival for 10 years, and curated for William Grant Still Community Arts Center and Watts Towers Arts Center. In 1989, Fergerson became director of the art gallery at Los Angeles Southwest College.

== Legacy ==
In 1989, artist Richard Wyatt created a tribute mural, "Cecil," that is on display at the Watts Towers in Los Angeles.
