= Charles Dixon (bodybuilder) =

American bodybuilder

- Professional bodybuilder
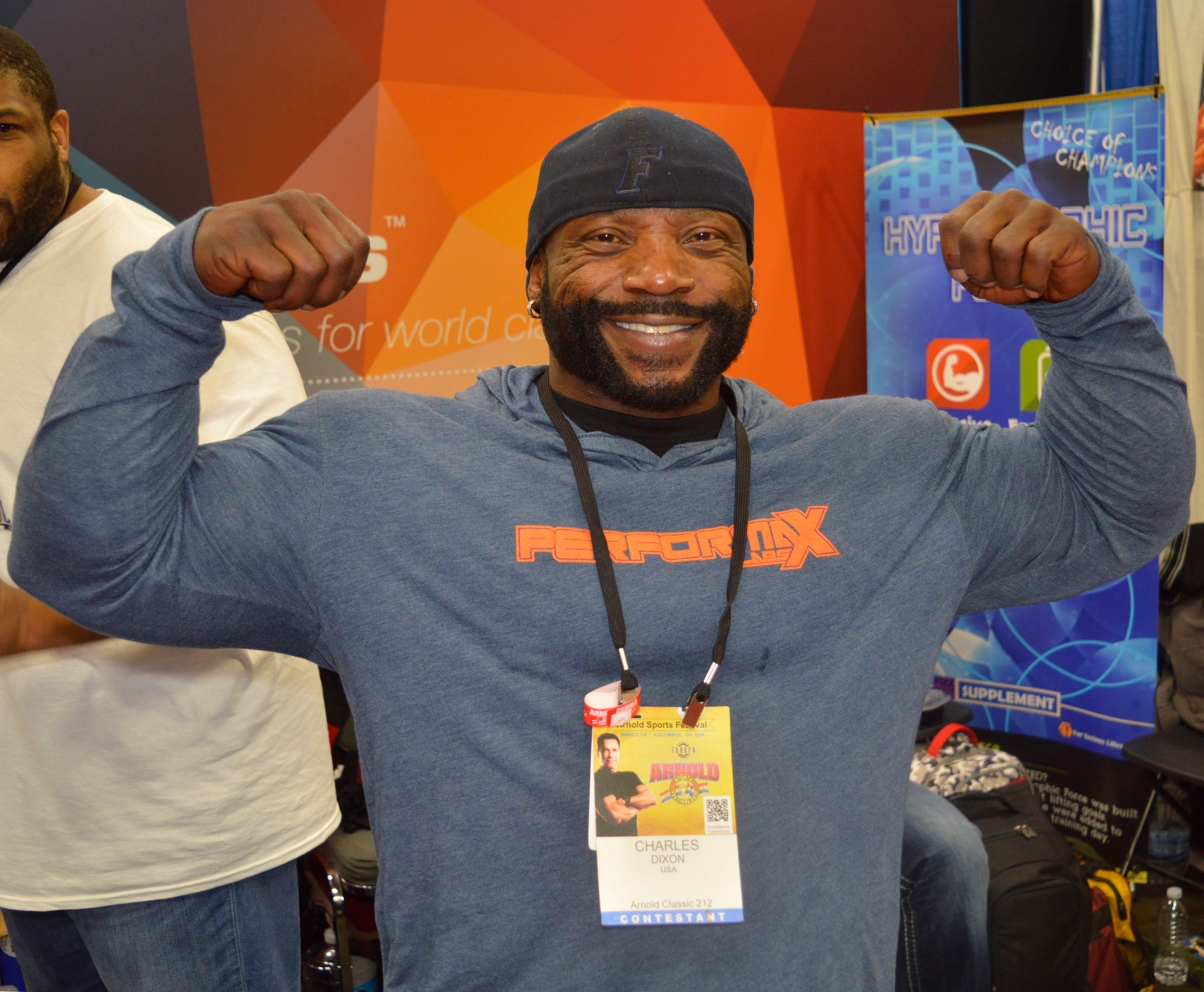
- Dixon at the Arnold Classic 2016

Personal info
- Born: 1972 (age 53–54); Greenville, South Carolina, U. S.

Best statistics
- Height: 5 ft 4 in (1.63 m)
- Weight: 198 lb (90 kg)

Professional (Pro) career
- Pro-debut: 2008
- Best win: Europa Phoenix Pro; 2015

Charles Dixon (born c. 1972) is an American bodybuilder, who competes professionally since 2008. He won the Europa Phoenix Pro in 2015 and placed 10th–11th at the Mr. Olympia in 2008–2009. In 1996 he graduated from Carson–Newman University with a degree in public relations.

== Competition history ==
- 2015 IFBB Europa Phoenix Pro – 1st
- 2015 IFBB Olympia Weekend – 7th
- 2015 IFBB St. Louis Pro – 1st
- 2015 IFBB Arnold Sports Festival – 5th
- 2014 IFBB Olympia Weekend – 10th
- 2014 IFBB Wings of Strength Chicago Pro – 1st
- 2014 IFBB Arnold Classic – 6th
- 2013 IFBB Europa Phoenix Pro – 4th
- 2013 IFBB New York Pro – 10th
- 2012 IFBB Valenti Gold Cup Pro – 3rd
- 2011 IFBB Iowa Pro 212 & Bikini Championship – 6th
- 2009 IFBB Mr. Olympia – 11th
- 2009 IFBB Europa Super Show & Supplement Expo – 2nd
- 2009 IFBB Jacksonville Pro – 4th
- 2008 IFBB Mr. Olympia – 10th
- 2008 IFBB New York Pro 202 – 4th
- 2008 IFBB New York Pro – 10th
