= Grafton Tyler Brown =

American painter (1841–1918)

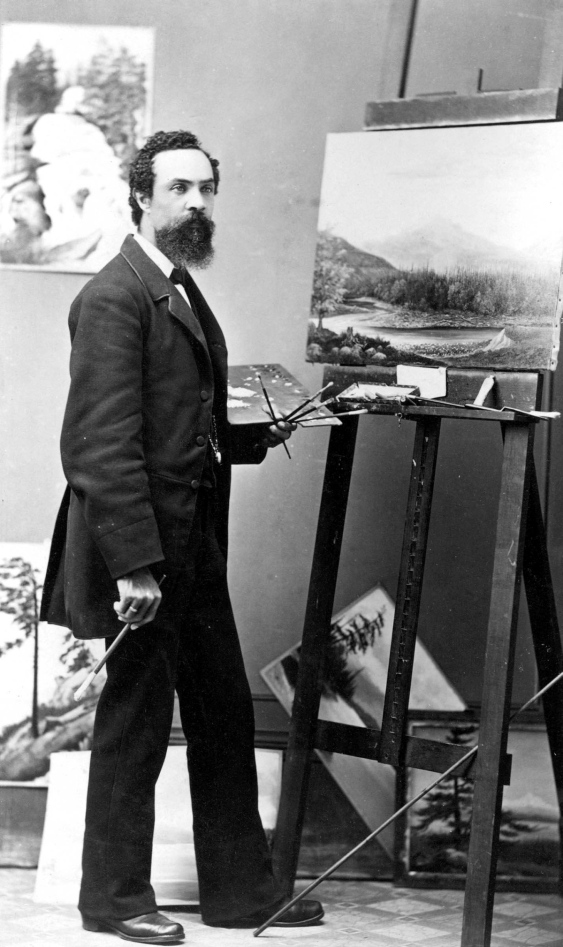
- Born: February 22, 1841; Harrisburg, Pennsylvania
- Died: March 2, 1918 (aged 77); St. Peter, Minnesota
- Known for: Painter, lithographer, and cartographer

Grafton Tyler Brown (February 22, 1841 – March 2, 1918) was an American painter, lithographer and cartographer. Brown was the first African-American artist to create works depicting the Pacific Northwest and California.

== Early life and education ==
He was born on February 22, 1841, in Harrisburg, Pennsylvania. His parents were Wilhelmina and Thomas Brown, who were born free in Maryland and moved to Pennsylvania in 1837. His father was a freedman and was involved in the abolitionist movement. Brown worked for a printer in Philadelphia when he was fourteen. It was there where he learned the skill of lithography.

== Career ==
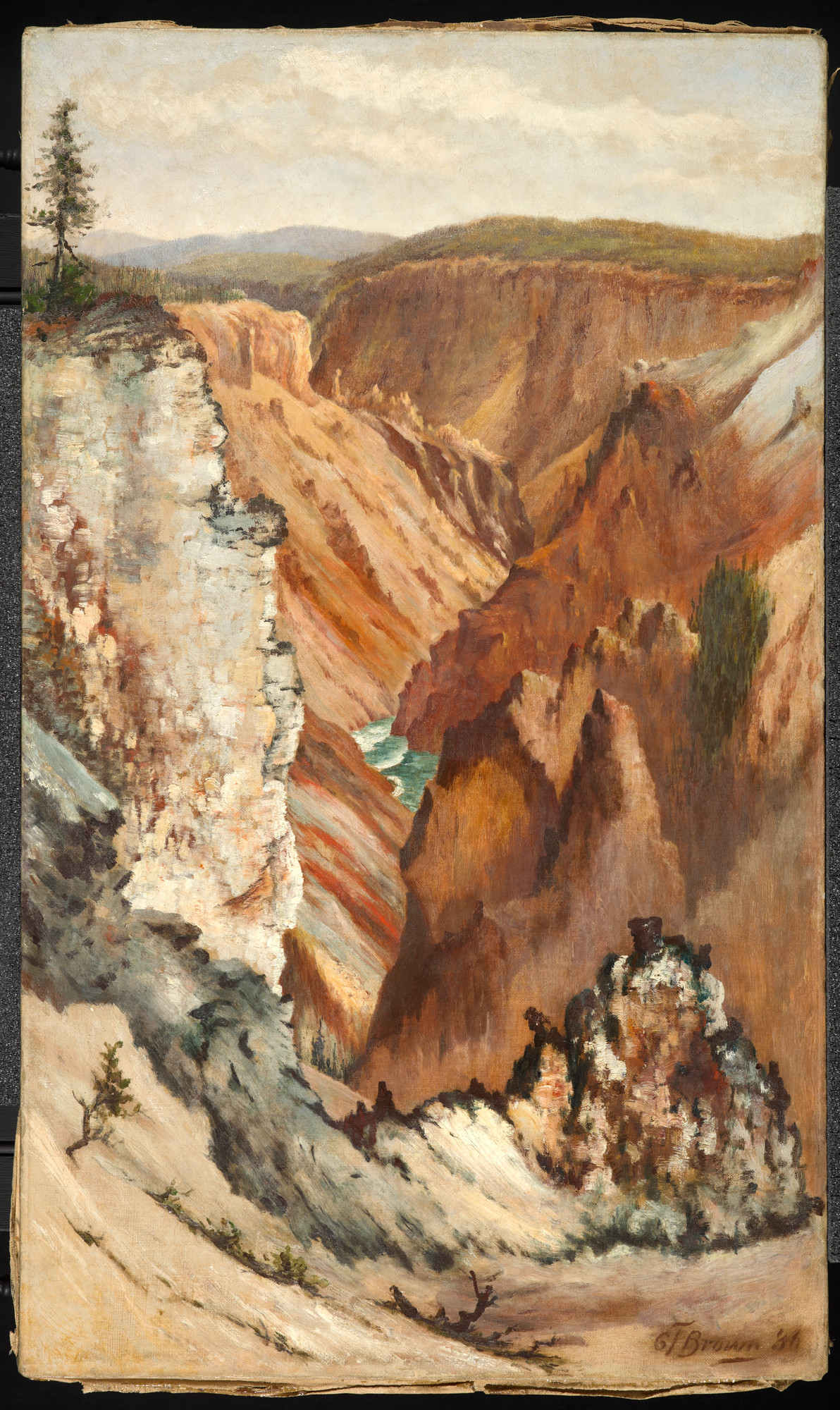
Grafton Tyler Brown, Grand Canyon, Yellowstone, 1886, 1886. Brooklyn Museum, 2012.92

Brown moved to Sacramento in 1858 and worked as a hotel steward and porter where his artistic skills were first publicly noticed, with the Sacramento Union calling out Grafton Brown’s "good painting" of the British steamship Great Eastern. Shortly thereafter he moved to San Francisco where he worked as a lithographer before becoming known as a painter in the 1880s. In San Francisco, he worked at Kuchel & Dressel from 1861–1867. In 1867 when Kuchel died, Brown bought the business from Kuchel’s widow and renamed it G.T. Brown & Co. Economic activity in California that was supported by mining activity led to Brown creating advertisements, maps, and scrip for a range of clients throughout the 1870s. In 1878 he created The Illustrated History of San Francisco, which consisted of 72 topographical images of the city. Brown's work in the Bay Area and in the Nevada Territory included documentation of settlements, property sales, claims and city boundaries.

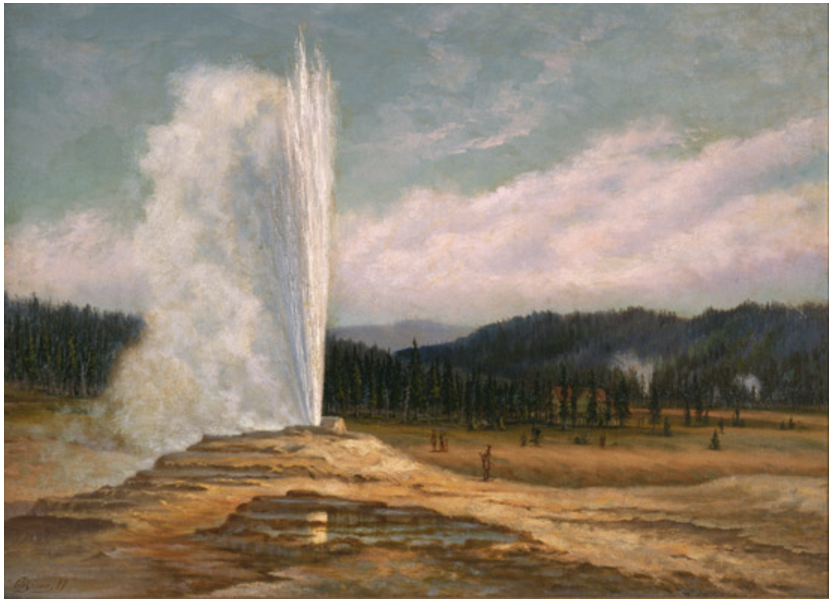
Grafton Tyler Brown, Old Faithful Geyser, Yellowstone National Park, 1887

The following year he sold his company. He left the Bay Area in 1882 and moved to Victoria, British Columbia. While there, he participated in the Amos Bowman Geological Survey. While participating in the survey, he served as draftsman and documented the Cascade Mountains. In 1884 he moved back to the United States and traveled throughout the northwest and west, painting such sites as Mount Rainier. He lived in Portland, Oregon, painting landscapes and also traveling to Yosemite and Yellowstone National Park to paint. Grafton Tyler Brown was a painter whose identity changed from Black to white as he moved across the Pacific Northwest.

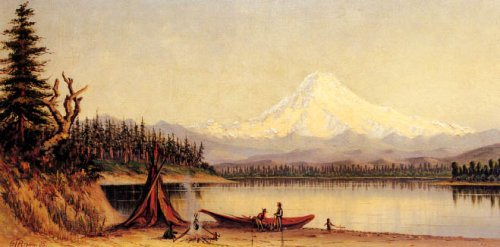
Grafton Tyler Brown, Mount Tacoma, by 1918

In 1893, Brown moved to Saint Paul, Minnesota. In St. Paul he worked again as a draftsman, this time for the United States Army Corps of Engineers and for the city of St. Paul's engineering department. He died in St. Peter, Minnesota, on March 2, 1918.

Brown's works are held in the collections of the Royal British Columbia Museum, Oakland Museum of California, Crocker Art Museum in Sacramento, California Smithsonian American Art Museum, and the Los Angeles County Museum of Art.

== Notable exhibitions ==
- Blacks in the Westward Movement, 1975, Anacostia Community Museum
- Grafton Tyler Brown: Visualizing California and the Pacific Northwest, California African American Museum and Walters Art Museum
