= Watts Towers =

Folk art site in Los Angeles, California

- Watts Towers of Simon Rodia; Simon Rodia State Historic Park
- U.S. National Register of Historic Places
- U.S. National Historic Landmark
- California Historical Landmark
- Los Angeles Historic-Cultural Monument
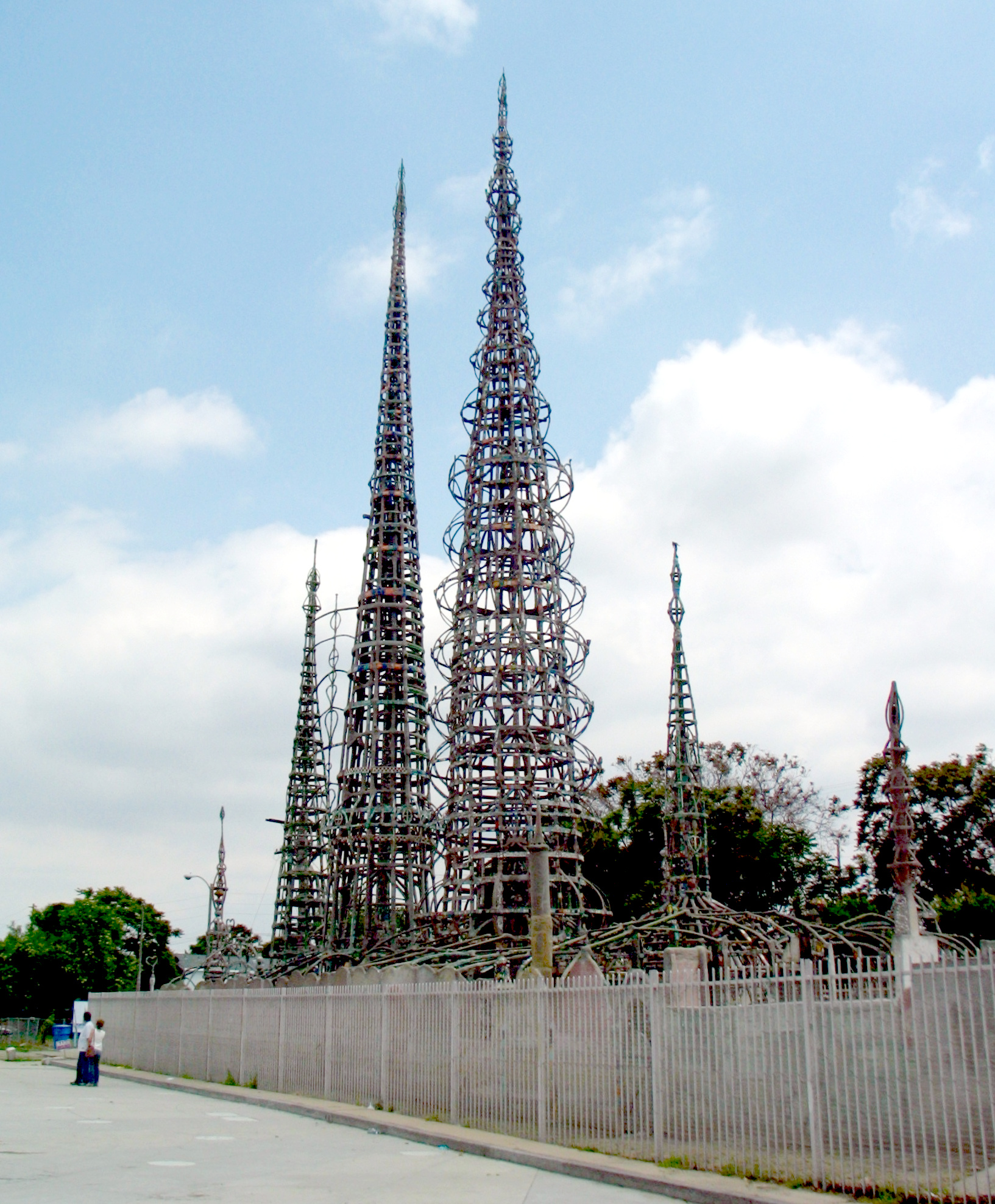

- Location within Southern Los Angeles Location within the Los Angeles metropolitan area Location within California Location within the United States
- Location: 1765 E. 107th Street, Los Angeles, California 90002
- Coordinates: 33°56′19.46″N 118°14′27.77″W
- Built: 1921–1954
- Architect: Sabato Rodia
- NRHP reference No.: 77000297
- CHISL No.: 993
- LAHCM No.: 15

Significant dates
- Added to NRHP: April 13, 1977
- Designated NHL: December 14, 1990
- Designated CHISL: August 17, 1990
- Designated LAHCM: March 1, 1963

The Watts Towers, Towers of Simon Rodia, or Nuestro Pueblo ("our town" in Spanish) are a collection of 17 interconnected sculptural towers, architectural structures, and individual sculptural features and mosaics on a property in Watts, Los Angeles, California, United States. The entire site of towers, structures, sculptures, pavement, and walls were designed and built solely by Sabato ("Simon" or "Sam") Rodia (1879 or 1886 to 1965), an Italian immigrant construction worker and tile mason, on his own property over a period of 33 years from 1921 to 1954. The tallest of the towers is 99.5 feet (30.3 m). The work is an example of outsider art (or Art Brut) and Italian-American naïve art.

The Watts Towers were designated a National Historic Landmark and a California Historical Landmark in 1990. They are also a Los Angeles Historic-Cultural Monument, and one of nine folk art sites listed in the National Register of Historic Places in Los Angeles. The Watts Towers of Simon Rodia State Historic Park encompasses the Watts Towers site.

== Simon Rodia ==
Sabato ("Simon" or "Sam") Rodia (February 12, 1878 – July 17, 1965) was born and raised in Serino, Italy. In 1895, aged seventeen, he emigrated to the United States with his brother. Rodia lived in Pennsylvania until his brother died in a mining incident. He then moved to Seattle, Washington, where he married Lucia Ucci in 1902. They soon moved to Oakland, where Rodia's three children were born. Following his divorce around 1909, he moved to Long Beach and worked in construction and other odd jobs before finally settling in Watts in 1920. Among the projects he is known, or claimed, to have worked on are the UC Berkeley campus, the Eastern Star Home and the Bullocks Wilshire building. Rodia began constructing the Watts Towers in 1921.

There has been some question as to what Rodia was called during his lifetime; some sources have cited that his birth name was "Sabatino" and it is disputed as to whether he was called "Simon" during his lifetime. It is widely known and accepted that he was referred to as "Sam" by close friends. He appears as Samuel Rodia (and still living in Oakland) in the 1910 U.S. Census, but by the time of the 1920 U.S. Census, he had already become Sam Rodia. His surname has also been misspelled as "Rodella" or "Rodilla".

== Design and construction ==
Doorway detail

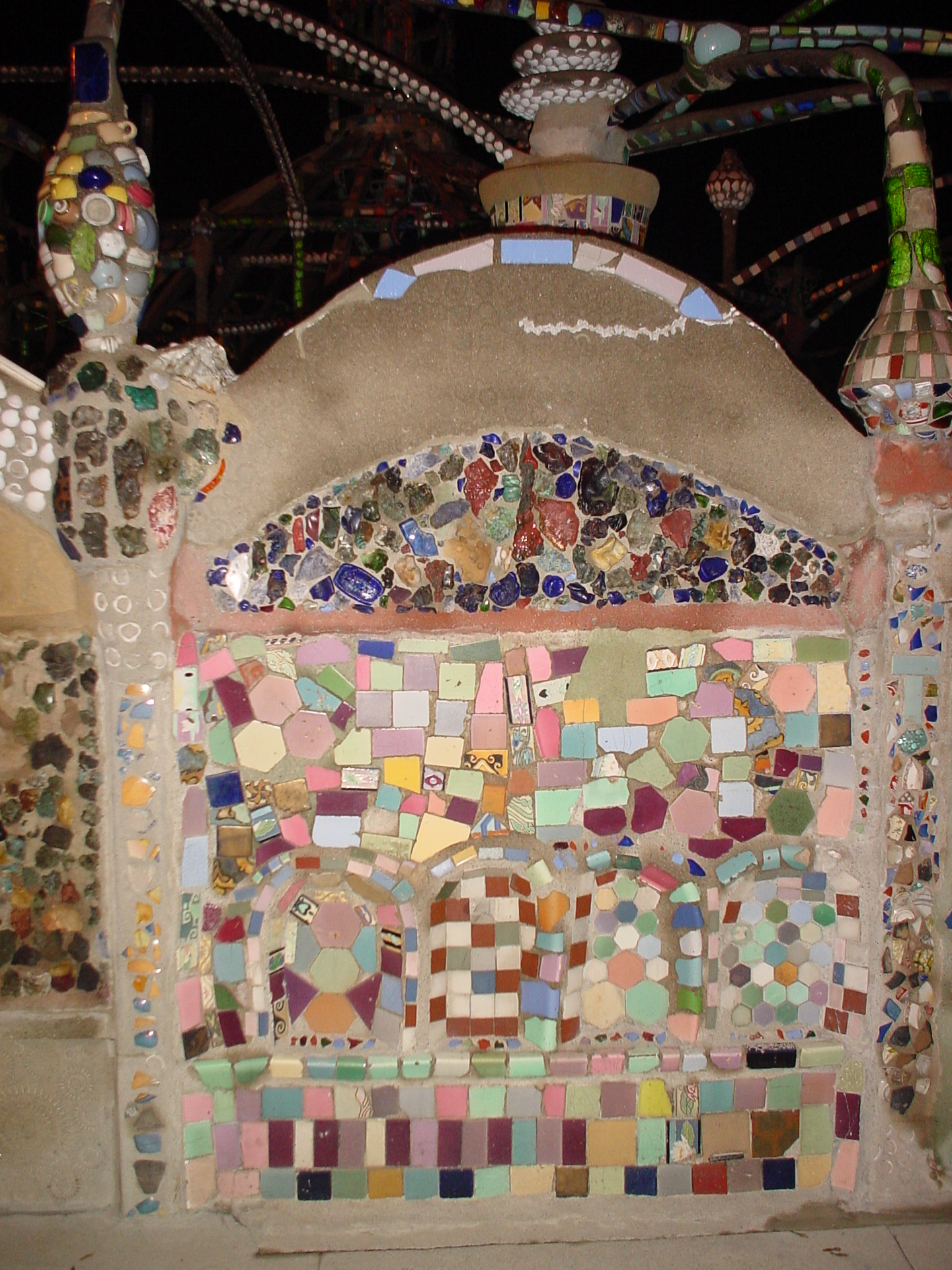
Wall detail, with mosaic

The sculptures' armatures are constructed from steel rebar and Rodia's own concoction of a type of concrete, wrapped with wire mesh. The main supports are embedded with pieces of porcelain, tile, and glass. They are decorated with found objects, including bottles, ceramic tiles, seashells, figurines, mirrors, and other items. Rodia called the Towers "Nuestro Pueblo" ("our town" in Spanish). He built them with no special equipment or predetermined design, working alone with hand tools. Neighborhood children brought pieces of broken pottery to Rodia, and he also used damaged pieces from Malibu Potteries and CALCO (California Clay Products Company). Green glass includes recognizable soft drink bottles from the 1930s through the 1950s, some still bearing the former logos of 7 Up, Squirt, Bubble Up, and Canada Dry; blue glass appears to be from milk of magnesia bottles. Their structural design and placement near the builder's home are strongly reminiscent of the gigli ("lilies") towers which feature in an annual festival to St. Paulinus in Nola, Italy, with which he was probably familiar.

Rodia bent much of the Towers' framework from scrap rebar, using nearby railroad tracks as a makeshift vise. Other items came from alongside the Pacific Electric Railway right-of-way between Watts and Wilmington. Rodia often walked the right-of-way all the way to Wilmington in search of material, a distance of nearly 20 miles (32 km).

In the summer of 1954, Rodia suffered a mild stroke. Shortly after the stroke, he fell off a tower from a low height. In 1955, Rodia gave his property to a neighbor and left, reportedly tired of battling with the City of Los Angeles for permits, and because he understood the possible consequences of his aging and being alone. He also mentioned that the towers were frequently vandalized by neighbors. He moved to Martinez, California, to be with his sister. He remained there for the next eleven years until his death in 1965.

== Preservation after Rodia ==
Rodia's bungalow inside the enclosure burned down as a result of an accident on the Fourth of July 1956, and the City of Los Angeles condemned the structure and ordered it all to be destroyed. Actor Nicholas King and film editor William Cartwright visited the site in 1959, and purchased the property from Rodia's neighbor for $2,000 in order to preserve it. The city's decision to pursue expediting the demolition was still in force. The towers had already become famous and there was opposition from around the world. King, Cartwright, architects, artists, enthusiasts, academics, and community activists formed the Committee for Simon Rodia's Towers in Watts. The committee negotiated with the city to allow for an engineering test to establish the safety of the structures and avoid their demolition.

Tests conducted on October 10, 1959, found that the towers were capable of withstanding lateral forces of up to 10,000 pounds (4,500 kg).

=== Conservation and damage ===
The Committee for Simon Rodia's Towers preserved the site independently until 1975 when, for the purpose of guardianship, they partnered with the City of Los Angeles and then with the State of California in 1978. The Towers are operated by the City of Los Angeles Cultural Affairs Department and curated by the Watts Towers Arts Center/Charles Mingus Youth Arts Center, which grew out of the Youth Arts Classes originally established in the house structure.

In February 2011, the Los Angeles County Museum of Art received a grant from the James Irvine Foundation to scientifically assess and report on the condition of the Watts Towers, to continue to preserve the undisturbed structural integrity and composition of the aging works of art. Weather and moisture caused pieces of tile and glass to become loose on the towers, which were conserved for reattachment in the ongoing restoration work. The structures suffered little from the 1994 Northridge earthquake in the region, with only a few pieces shaken loose. An extensive restoration project by the Los Angeles County Museum of Art began in 2017. The site re-opened in November 2022 when the work was finished.

=== California Historic Landmark marker ===
California Historic Landmark Marker on the site reads:

NO. 993 WATTS TOWERS OF SIMON RODIA – The Watts Towers are perhaps the nation's best known work of folk art sculpture. Using simple hand tools, cast off materials (glass, shell, pottery pieces and broken tile) Italian immigrant Simon Rodia spent 30 years building a tribute to his adopted country and a monument to the spirit of individuals who make their dreams tangible. Rodia's Towers inspired many to rally and preserve his work and protect it for the future.

== Special exhibits ==
The Los Angeles County Museum of Art mounted a 1962 photographic exhibition, Simon Rodia’s Towers in Watts: A Photographic Exhibition, which was the first museum exhibition on the art or Simon Rodia and the towers.

Two artist interviews, "Watts Towers Q&A with Dominique Moody" and "Q&A With Artist Alison Saar About Her Connection to Watts Towers," were produced in 2012 by the Los Angeles County Museum of Art as part of its Exhibitions on View series.

== In popular culture ==
=== Literature ===
Jazz musician Charles Mingus mentioned Rodia's Towers in his 1971 autobiography Beneath the Underdog, writing about his childhood fascination with Rodia and his work. There is also a reference to the work in Don DeLillo's novel Underworld.

California-based poet Robert Duncan featured Rodia's Towers in his 1959 poem "Nel Mezzo del Cammin di Nostra Vita," as an example of democratic art that is free of church/state power structures.

In her 1974 book, Eve's Hollywood, Eve Babitz describes a visit to the towers.

In his book White Sands, Geoff Dyer writes about his visit to the Watts Towers in the chapter "The Ballad of Jimmy Garrison".

The short story "With Virgil Oddum at the East Pole", by science fiction writer Harlan Ellison, is directly inspired by the Watts Towers and dedicated to the memory of Sabotini Rodia. The story placed first in the 1986 Locus Award for Best Short Story.

=== Film ===
- The 1957 short documentary film The Towers, by William Hale, includes voice recordings of Rodia and footage of the artist at work. The film incorrectly refers to the artist as "Simon Rodilla". The film was preserved by the Academy Film Archive in 2009.
- In the 1967 movie Good Times, Sonny & Cher dance around in one of the towers.
- In the 1972 movie Melinda, the title character Melinda Lewis (Vonetta McGee) is taken to see the towers.
- In the 1973 concert documentary Wattstax the towers are repeatedly featured from multiple vantages.
- The climax of the 1976 blaxploitation movie Dr. Black, Mr. Hyde takes place at the towers.
- The climax of the 1977 blaxploitation movie Abar, the First Black Superman takes place at the towers.
- The 1988 movie Colors ends with Sean Penn's character Danny McGavin near the towers.
- The 1991 movie Ricochet, starring Denzel Washington, climaxes with Washington's character Nick Styles swinging on the towers.
- The 1993 movie CB4 shows Chris Elliott recording a piece for his character A. White's documentary in front of the towers.
- The 1993 movie Menace II Society shows the towers at the beginning of the film.
- The 2003 movie Bringing Down the House depicts the towers near the climax of the film where Queen Latifah's character Charlene Morton returns home to Watts while on the run.
- The 2006 documentary I Build the Tower focuses on Rodia, and his creative vision and skill in building the Towers. The 1987 docudrama Daniel and The Towers is about them also. The Towers of Simon Rodia is a 2008 documentary filmed in digital 3-D.
- The 2016 movie La La Land shows the film's main characters Seb Wilder (Ryan Gosling) and Mia Dolan (Emma Stone) visiting the towers in a montage sequence.

=== Television ===
- The Watts Towers were highlighted in the 1973 BBC television series The Ascent of Man, written and presented by Jacob Bronowski, in the episode "The Grain in the Stone—tools, and the development of architecture and sculpture".
- The towers are featured in a film within episode 1365 of Mister Rogers' Neighborhood, aired in 1974.
- The 1987 made-for-TV movie Daniel and the Towers, starring Miguel Alamo, tells the story of Simon Rodia (Allan Arbus) and his relationship with fictional neighborhood troublemaker Daniel Guerra.
- The towers were the topic of season 13, episode 1 of Reading Rainbow titled, "The Wonderful Towers of Watts."
- The towers were depicted on The Simpsons season 22 episode "Angry Dad: The Movie".
- The towers appear and are discussed by student artists Claire Fisher (Lauren Ambrose) and Russel Corwin (Ben Foster) in "Nobody Sleeps", a season 3 episode of Six Feet Under.
- The towers appear and are discussed in 2017 season 1, episode 1 of the Amazon Originals miniseries release of the documentary film Long Strange Trip.
- The towers feature heavily in episode 16 "Burn, Baby, Burn" of the sci-fi series Dark Skies. The episode is set during the Watts Riots of August 1965.
- The towers were featured in episode 9 of Visiting... with Huell Howser.
- The towers are featured in "Bitter Almonds", season 1, episode 4 of the Netflix series From Scratch.

=== Music ===
- A photograph of Simon Rodia is included on the cover of the Beatles' 1967 album Sgt. Pepper's Lonely Hearts Club Band.
- The cover of the US edition of his album Harold in the Land of Jazz (1958) shows Harold Land, playing a tenor saxophone while standing in front of the Watts Towers.
- The cover of the US edition of his album Brown Rice (1975, released 1977) shows Don Cherry, pocket trumpet in hand, standing in front of the Watts Towers.
- The song "Good Time Boys", on the Red Hot Chili Peppers' 1989 album, Mother’s Milk, references "…the mighty Watts Towers".
- The music video for the song, "Hate It or Love It" (featuring 50 Cent), from The Game's 2005 album The Documentary, briefly features the Watts Towers.
- The song, "Come A Long Way" on the 1992 Michelle Shocked album, Arkansas Traveler, mentions "… All along the Watts Tower".

=== Radio ===
- In an August 2017 episode of BBC Radio 4's The Museum of Curiosity, California-born textile artist Kaffe Fassett chose the Watts Towers as his hypothetical donation to this imaginary museum.

=== Video games ===
- The 2004 game Grand Theft Auto: San Andreas, the city of Los Santos features the Watts Towers, but in this version named as Sculpture Park.
- The 2005 street racing game LA Rush features the Watts Towers.
- The 2008 street racing game Midnight Club: Los Angeles features the Watts Towers.
- The 2013 game Grand Theft Auto V similarly features the Watts Towers, but in this version named as Rancho Towers.
- The 2014 game Wasteland 2 features the Watts Towers as part of the town of Rodia.

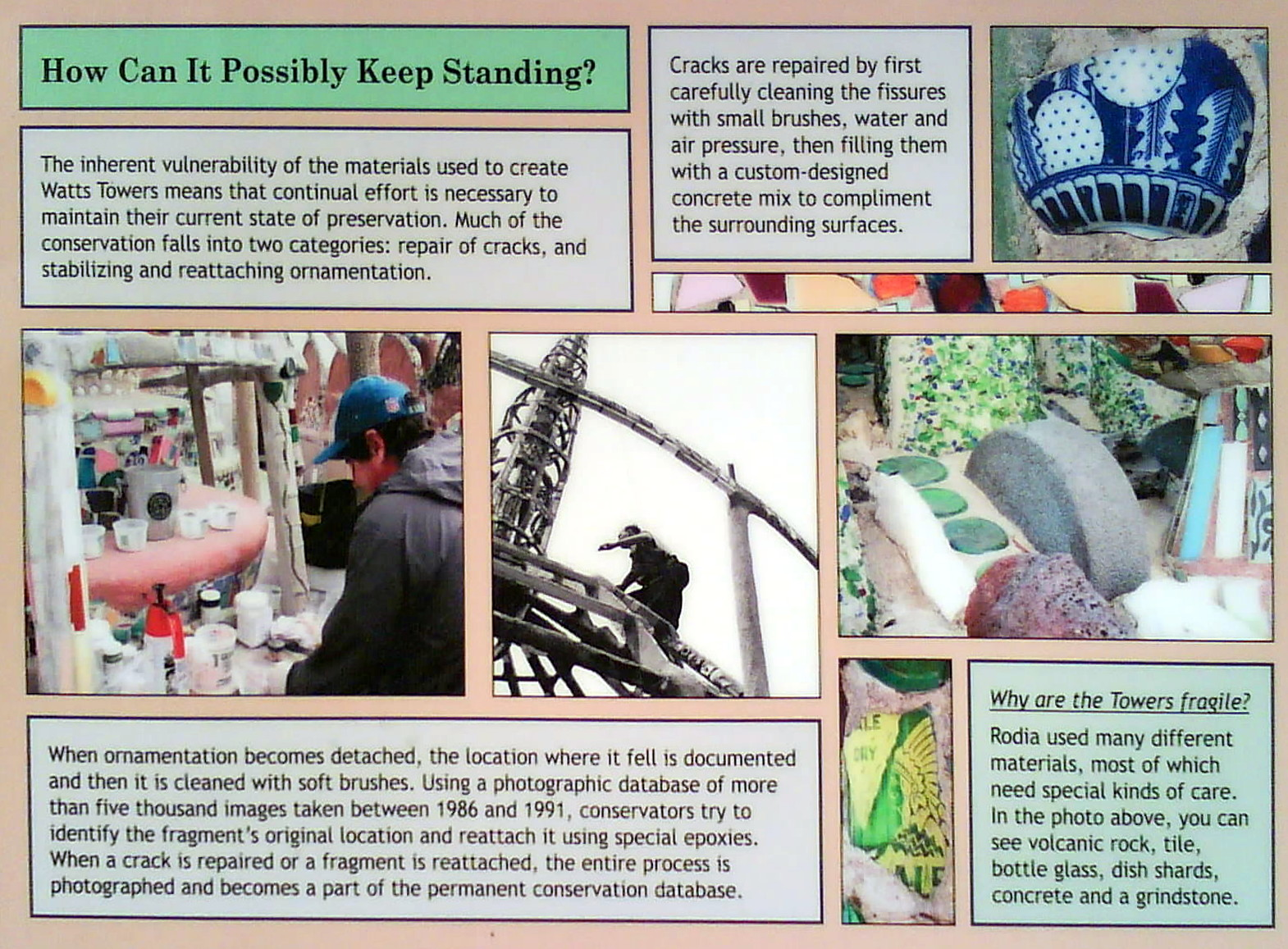
An explanation of how the Watts Towers are maintained

== Watts Towers Arts Center ==
The Watts Towers Arts Center is an adjacent community arts center. The current facility opened in 1970. Before that, the Center operated under a canopy next to the Towers. The center was built and staffed by the non-profit Committee for Simon Rodia's Towers in Watts. Changing displays of contemporary artworks are on exhibit, and tours of the Watts Towers are conducted by the center. The center's Charles Mingus Youth Arts Center holds art classes, primarily for youth and Special Needs adults from the local community and surrounding cities. Partnerships with CalArts and Sony Pictures provide media arts and piano classes. The Day of the Drum and Jazz Festival occurs annually on the last weekend of every September. It includes arts and craft booths and live music.

In 2026, Jeff Bezos's Earth Fund provided $10.1 million to expand the Watts Towers Arts Center campus and add a 30,000-square-foot (2,800 m^{2}) park. The grant funded about half of a $22 million project to restore the campus prior to the 2028 Summer Olympics. Work began in October 2026.

== Watts Towers Crescent Greenway ==
Watts Towers Crescent Greenway is a 0.2-mile (1,100 ft; 320 m) rail with trail bike–pedestrian path next to the Towers. It is the shortest open rail-trail in the U.S.

== See also ==
- List of National Historic Landmarks in California
- List of Registered Historic Places in Los Angeles
- List of Los Angeles Historic-Cultural Monuments in South Los Angeles
- Philadelphia's Magic Gardens
