= 1992 Los Angeles riots in popular culture =

This article lists examples of the ongoing influence on popular culture of the 1992 Los Angeles riots.

== Film ==
(Chronological, then alphabetical by title)

- Spike Lee's film Malcolm X (1992) opens with a scene of the Rodney King beating, juxtaposed with a burning American flag that burns down and forms the letter X.
- The documentary film Post No Bills (1992) follows a political poster that was made of LAPD Chief Daryl Gates on an NRA shooting target and glued up on the streets of Los Angeles after the Rodney King beating. Post No Bills also includes an interview with Chief Gates about the poster and documents some of the events surrounding the resignation of Chief Gates from his position as Chief of Police.
- In John Singleton's second film, Poetic Justice (1993), Justice (Janet Jackson) drives her car, passing through the Crenshaw Square shopping center. The visible destruction to the building were entirely real, not a movie set.
- Dai Sil Kim-Gibson's documentary film Sa-I-Gu (1993) tells the story of Korean women shopkeepers during the LA Civil Unrest.
- The film Floundering (1994) explores the alienation and disaffection the main character sees in his neighborhood of post-riot Venice Beach.
- The Brian Springer documentary Spin (1995) uses intercepted raw satellite feeds from commercial television to chronicle 1992 with significant attention to the riots and their treatment by the media, as well as urban conditions more generally.
- Kathryn Bigelow's film Strange Days (1995) was influenced by the riots and "replays" and condenses the events and images of the Rodney King beating, trial and riots.
- The film Riot (1997) looks at the riots and their effect on the lives of four families: one Chinese, one Hispanic, one White, and one Black.
- In the film American History X (1998), characters argue about the circumstances of Rodney King's arrest.
- The final act of Dark Blue (2002) is set during the riots, reenacts several portions of it, as well as shows news footage of the attack on Reginald Denny.
- Dai Sil Kim-Gibson's film Wet Sand: Voices from LA (2004) criticizes mainstream media for pitting Korean Americans against African Americans in the days preceding the LA Civil Unrest.
- The film Rize (2005) is a documentary of life and the development of two dancing subcultures, clowning and krumping, in Watts, Los Angeles after the 1992 riots. It features footage of the 1992 riots as well as the 1965 Watts riots.
- The film The L.A. Riot Spectacular (2006), narrated by Snoop Dogg and starring Emilio Estevez, Charles S. Dutton, and George Hamilton, takes a satirical look at the riots.
- The film Freedom Writers (2007) stars Hilary Swank as a school teacher in a Long Beach high school two years after the riots. The film opens with scenes of the riots and is set two years afterward, in 1994.
- The film Straight Outta Compton (2015) shows footage from the L.A. riots, which are also discussed.
- The documentary film Let It Fall: Los Angeles 1982–1992 (2017), directed by John Ridley, is about the 10-year period leading up to, and including, the L.A. Riots. Its release coincided with the 25th anniversary of the unrest.
- Gook is a 2017 American drama film written and directed by Justin Chon that tells the story of two Korean-American brothers and their unlikely friendship with a neighborhood 11 year-old black girl, during the first day of the 1992 Los Angeles riots.
- The documentary film LA 92 chronicles the event on its 25th anniversary.
- The drama-action film, 1992, depicts the riots being used as a distraction for a group of thieves to pull off a heist at a factory housing catalytic converters.

== Literature ==
(Alphabetical by author)

- Paul Beatty's novel The White Boy Shuffle features the main character's involvement in the riots, including an argument on the way to loot a computer store over the "merits of an IBM-compatible versus an Apple."
- Eve Bunting and David Díaz's Smoky Night is a children's picture book about two neighboring families who lived through the riots, and learn to accept each other despite their ethnicity.
- The novel All Involved (2016) by Ryan Gattis involves mainly fictional gang members who use the chaos to viciously settle old scores.
- In The Freedom Writers Diary (1999) by Erin Gruwell, the L.A. Riots had a staggering effect on the diarists.
- Héctor Tobar's novel The Tattooed Soldier (1998) concludes during the riots, which are seen as mirroring the violence and breakdown of civil order that the novel's main characters had experienced in Guatemala before emigrating.

== Music ==
The beating of Rodney King and the Los Angeles riots have influenced multiple musical artists and groups, with some writing music as a direct response to the events. Others have mentioned or referenced King or the riots in their work, as well as other events that are believed to have contributed to the 1992 riots, such as the killing of Latasha Harlins.

Notable songs or albums that reference these events include:

(Alphabetical by artist)

- 2Pac dedicated his 1993 single "Keep Ya Head Up" to Latasha Harlins and would later write the song "Hellrazor", which directly references her.
- German heavy metal band Accept wrote the song "Objection Overruled" in 1992, inspired by King's beating and the L.A. riots. The song criticizes the jury's decision to release the defendants.
- Aerosmith's song "Livin' on the Edge" from their 1993 album Get a Grip was inspired by the riots, as well as the peace messages of John Lennon.
- The first verse of Bad Religion's song "Don't Pray on Me" (off their 1993 album Recipe for Hate) references the riots.
- David Bowie and his wife Iman were in Los Angeles the day the riots started; Bowie wrote "Black Tie White Noise" based on the riots.
- Bratmobile's song "Polaroid Baby", from their debut album Pottymouth, talks about the artificiality of white youths, burning down L.A., and making "whitey" pay, a reference to the riots which occurred as the album was being recorded.
- Garth Brooks wrote "We Shall Be Free" while watching coverage of the riots on TV.
- Downset's song, "Anger", from their self-titled debut album was inspired by the riots. The cover of the album also features an image of South Central Los Angeles burning.
- Dr. Dre's song, "The Day tha Niggaz Took Over", references the riots. Snoop Dogg and RBX also feature on the song, portraying their emotions as the riots started.
- Far East Movement's 2014 album, K-Town Riot, was inspired by the riot. The music video for one of the tracks, "The Illest", features footages from the riot.
- Fear Factory's 1995 album, Demanufacture, was partially inspired by the riots.
- Fever 333 wrote the song “BURN IT” about Rodney King and the riots.
- Ben Harper's "Like a King" off, the 1993 album Welcome to the Cruel World, is based on the treatment of Rodney King.
- Ice Cube has written several songs that were inspired by and referenced the riots and Rodney King, such as "We Had to Tear This Motherfucka Up" and many songs on his 1992 album The Predator.
- Ice-T's song Race War from his 1993 solo album Home Invasion addressed the riots and the potential for further disturbances. He would later collaborate with Slayer for the song "Disorder", which appeared on the Judgment Night movie soundtrack. The song was a medley of three songs by the British punk rock band The Exploited. The song "UK '82" (which dealt with police brutality) was renamed "LA '92".
- Billy Idol's 1993 song, "Shock to the System", from the Cyberpunk album, was directly inspired by the riots.
- Kendrick Lamar's song "County Building Blues", from his 2012 album Good Kid, M.A.A.D City makes several references throughout verse two of the song.
- Lucky People Center's song Rodney King from their 1993 album Welcome to Lucky People Center features samples of Rodney King, L.A Police, and President George Bush, all set to an Ambient/Trance rhythm.
- The 1994 Machine Head song "Real Eyes, Realize, Real Lies", which features sampled commentary from news reports and interviews surrounding the riots.
- The title track of Porno For Pyros' debut album, along with "Black Girlfriend", both make reference to the riots, which occurred prior to the album's production.
- Rage Against the Machine's eponymous debut album contains songs such as "Killing in the Name" that were inspired by the riots.
- Redman's skit "News Break" had an excerpt from the news that a reporter informing the numbers of deaths and injures and talking about what is going on in the riot from the 1992 album Whut? Thee Album.
- Sublime's song, "April 29, 1992 (Miami)", is based on accounts of the riots. In the song Bradley Nowell (Lead singer of Sublime) tells of his part in the riot including robberies. He claims that it wasn't even about Rodney King for some people.
- The Offspring's song "L.A.P.D." off the album Ignition is about the Rodney King incident.
- Thurzday's debut album L.A. Riot was inspired by the events of the Rodney King beating and the Los Angeles Riots.
- Tom Petty and the Heartbreakers rush-released a single entitled "Peace in L.A."
- Warren Zevon responded to the riots with the song "The Indifference of Heaven" which would make its live debut shortly after the riots (as recorded on his 1993 live album Learning to Flinch) and would receive a studio recording on his 1995 album Mutineer.

== Television ==
After the riots multiple television shows, particularly those airing in the 1990s, featured episodes that mentioned or directly depicted the impact of the Rodney King beating and the Los Angeles riots. These shows included scripted ones such as Beverly Hills, 90210, Doogie Howser, M.D., and The Fresh Prince of Bel-Air, as well as talk and reality shows such as The Real World. The below shows are ones where the episodes have received particular note. They are listed in alphabetical order:

- In the 1992-1993 season premiere of the NBC sitcom A Different World, Dwayne and Whitley's Los Angeles honeymoon coincides with the riots.
- The third-season opener of the Fox comedy series In Living Color focused on the L.A. riots, and subsequent third-season episodes featured skits focusing on the L.A. riots (example: "The L.A. Riots Anniversary Special" promo).
- The NBC drama L.A. Law seventh-season opener was set on the day of the riots.
- The fifth episode of the second season of the 2022 reboot of Quantum Leap follows protagonist Ben Song as he leaps into the body of a Korean American teenager in order to prevent his father's death during the riots.
- Extensive coverage of the riots was featured on The Arsenio Hall Show. Mayor Tom Bradley appeared on the show and pleaded for calm to the residents of L.A.

== Theater ==
- Stage actress Anna Deavere Smith created a play, Twilight: Los Angeles, 1992, based on interviews with people about the riots.
- Actor Roger Guenveur Smith created a solo show Rodney King, which was later filmed by Spike Lee, about King and the riots.

== Video games ==
- The end missions in the game Grand Theft Auto: San Andreas revolve around the acquittal of the extremely corrupt police officer Frank Tenpenny, the main antagonist in the game in 1992. The acquittal causes riots throughout the city of Los Santos, which is modeled on Los Angeles.
