= Let It Fall =

Let It Fall may refer to:

- Let It Fall, a 2001 single by Sean Watkins
- Let It Fall, from the 2013 Eurovision winner Emmelie de Forest
- Let It Fall: Los Angeles 1982–1992, a 2017 documentary about the 1992 Los Angeles Riots directed by John Ridley.
