= Brenda Elaine Stevenson =

American historian

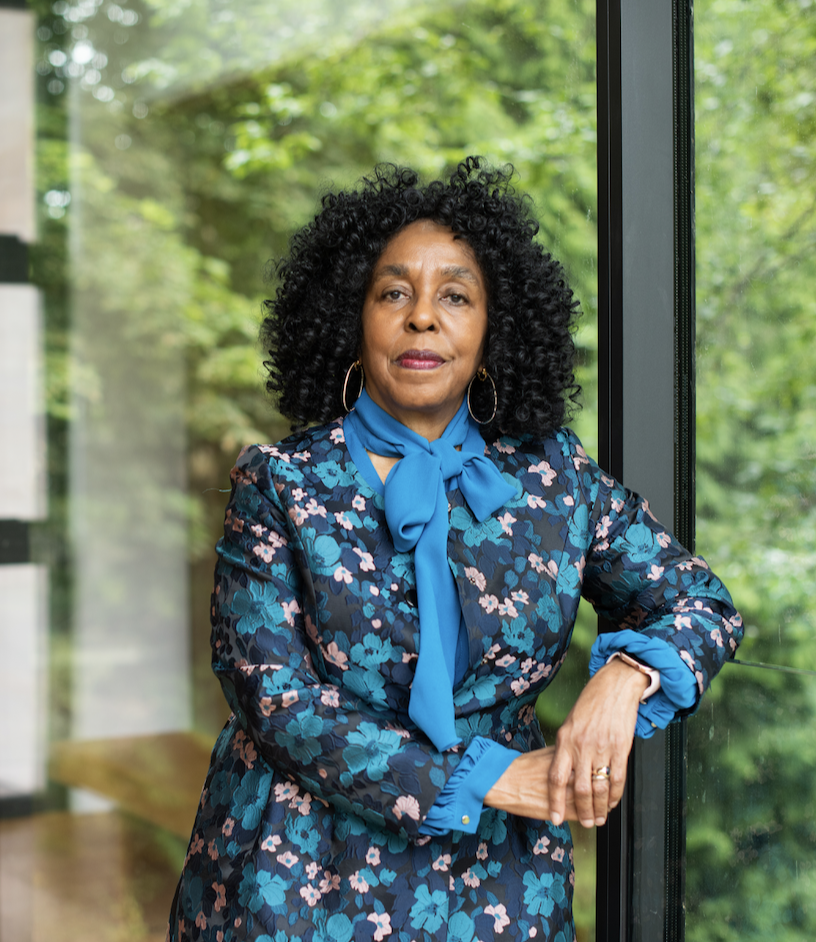
- Born: Portsmouth, Virginia, U.S.
- Education: University of Virginia; Yale University
- Occupation: Historian
- Known for: Hillary Rodham Clinton Chair of Women's History at St John's College, Oxford
- Notable work: Life in Black and White: Family and Community in the Slave South
- Spouse: James H. Cones III
- Children: 1
- Parent(s): James William and Emma Gerald Stevenson

Brenda Elaine Stevenson is an American historian specializing in the history of the Southern United States and African-American history, particularly slavery, gender, race and race riots. She is Professor and Nickoll Family Endowed Chair in History and Professor in African-American Studies at the University of California, Los Angeles (UCLA). As of Autumn 2021, she was appointed inaugural Hillary Rodham Clinton Chair of Women's History at St John's College, University of Oxford.

== Early life and education ==
Stevenson was born and raised in Portsmouth, Virginia, the second child of James William and Emma Gerald Stevenson. She received her undergraduate degree from the University of Virginia, where she was a DuPont Regional Scholar and an Echols Scholar. At Virginia, she studied with Paul Gaston, Joseph Miller, Arnold Rampersad, Vivian Gordon, Ray Nelson and Barry Gaspar.

She then enrolled in Yale University's M.A. program in African American Studies. Stevenson began her edition of The Journals of Charlotte Forten Grimke while in this program, and this work became part of the Schomburg Library of Nineteenth Century Black Women Writers. She continued in the Yale Ph.D. program in American history; she studied with John Blassingame, David Brion Davis, Nancy Cott, and Edmund S. Morgan.

Her Ph.D. dissertation became an award-winning book, Life in Black and White: Family and Community in the Slave South. This work challenged the revisionist claim of Herbert Gutman, John Blassingame and Eugene Genovese, among others, that enslaved families had a nuclear structure and male head, documenting instead that extended families were the most significant form of slave family structure, but that matrifocal and matrilocal kinship groups, slave women, as mothers particularly, were at the center of slave family life. The book received the Gustavus Myers Book Prize.

== Career ==
Her next major study, The Contested Murder of Latasha Harlins: Justice, Gender and the Origins of the L.A. Riots, challenged male-centered analyses of U.S. race riots, proposing that the 1992 Los Angeles riot erupted not only as a response to the Rodney King trial, but as a response to an earlier trial that ended with a controversial sentencing of a shopkeeper found guilty of murdering an unarmed black girl. Hector Tobar described Contested Murder in his Los Angeles Times review as "an excellent and methodically researched new history." The Library Journal review states that: "Stevenson skillfully combines the depth of a scholarly work with the rich details of a tragic novel." Contested Murder was awarded the Organization of American Historian's 2014 James A. Rawley Prize for the best book on the history of race relations in the U.S. and Women's eNews honored it with the 2015 Ida B. Wells Award for Bravery in Journalism. In 2015, she published What is Slavery?, which surveys the history of human bondage in pre-modern societies and black enslavement in the United States with emphasis on the social history elements. She also served as a senior editor for the three-volume Encyclopedia of Black Women's History, and is co-author of Underground Railroad.

Stevenson has served as both chair of the departments of history and African American Studies at UCLA. She also has taught at Wesleyan University, Rice University, the University of Texas at Austin, and Occidental College. She is a distinguished lecturer for the Organization of American Historians.

In October 2020, it was announced that Stevenson had been appointed the first Hillary Rodham Clinton Professor of Women's History at the University of Oxford. This appointment marks forty years since the first admission of female students to St John's College in 1979. She retired from the chair in 2024, being succeeded by Sarah Knott. In October 2021, Stevenson was nominated to serve as a member of the newly formed Civil Rights Cold Case Records Review Board.

In April 2023, Stevenson published her first work exclusively on the history of the enslaved Black family in the United States. What Sorrows Labour in My Parents' Breast? tracks the long history of the enslaved Black family, illuminating the critical role of family in the struggle, survival, and triumph of Black Americans. "Black families," Stevenson argues, "matter profoundly."

== Personal life ==
Brenda Stevenson is married to clinical psychologist and author James H. Cones III. They have one daughter, Emma Cones.

== Books ==
- Editor, The Journals of Charlotte Forten Grimke (New York: Oxford University Press, 1988).
- Life in Black and White: Family and Community in the Slave South (New York: Oxford University Press, 1996).
- Co-authored with Larry Gara and C. Peter Ripley, Underground Railroad: An Epic in United States History (Washington D.C.: U.S. Department of the Interior, 1998).
- Co-editor and contributor with Darlene Clark Hine, et al., Black Women in America, 3 vols (New York: Oxford University Press, 2005).
- The Contested Murder of Latasha Harlins: Justice, Gender and the Origins of the L.A. Riots (New York: Oxford University Press, 2013).
- What is Slavery? (Cambridge, UK: Polity Press, 2015).
- What Sorrows Labour in My Parents' Breast? A History of the Black Enslaved Family (Lanham: Rowman & Littlefield, 2023).

== Awards and honors ==
- John Simon Guggenheim Memorial Fellowship
- Berlin Prize, American Academy in Berlin
- John Hope Franklin Fellowship, National Humanities Center
- Center for Advanced Study and Behavioral Sciences Fellowship
- Ida B. Wells Award for Bravery in Journalism (Women's ENews)
- UCLA Gold Shield Faculty Award
- Organization of American Historians, James A. Rawley Prize, Best Book on the History of Race Relations in the U.S.
- Gustavus Myers Outstanding Book Prize
- Mellon Fellowship in the Humanities
- Carter G. Woodson Fellowship
- Smithsonian Fellowship in American History
- American Association of University Women Fellowship
- Virginia Foundation for the Humanities and Public Policy Fellowship
- UC Chancellor's Postdoctoral Fellowship
- UC President's Postdoctoral Fellowship
