= Dean Carter =

American spree killer (born 1955)

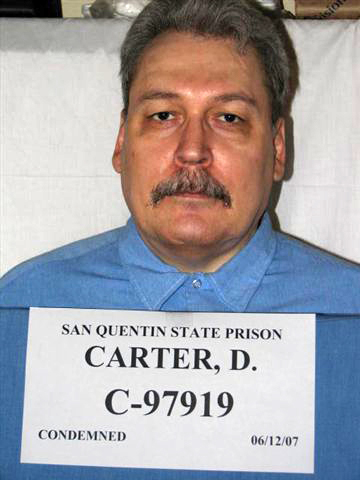
- Born: Dean Phillip Carter; August 30, 1955 (age 71); Nome, Territory of Alaska, U.S.
- Occupation: Television cameraman
- Status: Incarcerated
- Convictions: First-degree murder with special circumstances (4 counts); Rape (3 counts); Burglary (4 counts); Robbery
- Penalty: Death

Details
- Victims: 4–5+
- Date: March 25, 1984 – April 12, 1984
- Country: United States
- State: California
- Locations: San Diego, Ventura, Culver City
- Date apprehended: April 17, 1984
- Imprisoned at: California Health Care Facility

Dean Phillip Carter (born August 30, 1955) is an American convicted spree killer and serial rapist who was sentenced to death for the murders of four women in California in April 1984. He has also been implicated in the death of a fifth woman. Carter had met and befriended several of his victims at bars and restaurants prior to attacking them.

== Early life and career ==
Carter was born in Nome in the Territory of Alaska on August 30, 1955, as the illegitimate son of a half-Eskimo woman. He was adopted by his stepfather, who served as police chief, fire chief, and justice of the peace in the community. At the age of 12, Carter was committed to a youth camp, which he attempted to flee from at least three times. He was later placed in a foster home.

Carter served prison terms in Oregon for auto theft and in Alaska for burglary. During his incarceration in Alaska, Carter was trained as a television cameraman and video technician. Following his release in 1979, Carter worked with various television stations in Alaska. An individual who worked with Carter on an award-winning documentary on the Eskimo heritage recalled him as "just a normal guy, very attractive, very handsome".

Around the same time, Carter met and married a woman who lived in the area; she gave birth to twin sons shortly thereafter. Around three years later, Carter's wife divorced him and received custody of their children. Carter continued working as a cameraman, briefly in Seattle, before flying to Hawaii in December 1983 to work as a deckhand on a yacht headed for San Diego, where he obtained a job as a deckhand on another boat and began dating bartender Susan Loyland.

== Background ==
On February 25, 1984, 28-year-old Carter met Cathleen Tiner and Janette Ann Cullins at a café in Pacific Beach, San Diego; the latter would later become one of Carter's victims. Carter ordered a Harvey Wallbanger for each of the women, and they each gave him their phone number. Tiner and Cullins had dinner on a yacht with Carter and one of his friends on March 2. On March 4, Carter called Tiner and invited her to another outing, which she declined.

On March 24, Carter called Tiner, who declined his invitation to "run off to Mexico and get married". That evening, he called another acquaintance, 18-year-old Polly Haisha, whom he had met at a party in February of that year. Haisha would later testify that she and Carter had spoken several times in the weeks after meeting, and that although Carter "was very nice" during their first phone conversation, he became more aggressive and irritated as she kept giving excuses to reschedule their date. During their last phone call, Carter informed Haisha that he would be arriving in San Diego the following day, and she rejected his offer to "quit school and come sail to France". After Carter began insulting his ex-wife, Haisha told Carter that she was no longer comfortable speaking with or seeing him and asked him not to call her again.

== Home invasions ==
On the evening of March 25, Carter broke into the San Diego residence of Susan Loyland, who had planned to travel to Mexico for a date with Carter earlier that day, though she missed picking him up at a bus station and left without him. Carter, armed with a knife, raped Loyland's roommate and forced her to perform fellatio on him. Carter also robbed Loyland and her roommate of tip money and the latter's car keys, as well as hogtying her with her pantyhose before leaving. The woman managed to free herself with a knife, and a neighbor who heard her cries for help called police. This victim would later testify that she had met Carter prior to being attacked by him.

In the early hours of March 29, Carter, wearing a red bandana over his face and armed with a butcher knife, broke into the Ventura apartment of 22-year-old Jennifer Rose Steward, whom he proceeded to sexually assault and rape for around five hours, as well as strangling her into unconsciousness when she attempted to escape twice. Steward pretended to sympathize with her attacker to prevent him from becoming more violent, and convinced him to untie her by asking for a kiss. When Carter finally left at dawn, Steward waited for several minutes before running to a neighbor for help. Steward had met Carter before the attack when he was staying at a neighbor's residence; she avoided him despite Carter attempting to befriend her.

== Murders ==
On April 12, the bodies of Susan Lynn Knoll and Jillette Leonora Mills were found stacked inside a closed bedroom closet in the roommates' Culver City apartment by Mills' brother and a friend. Mills had been sexually assaulted, and each victim had died from asphyxia caused by strangulation. Knoll's vehicle was discovered one block from the apartment, though Mills' white Datsun 280 ZX automobile was missing, as were personal items belonging to both victims. Ronald C. Tulio—an employee of the United States Postal Service, the former boyfriend of Knoll, and an acquaintance of both Mills and victim Bonnie Guthrie—was arrested and detained by the Culver City Police Department later that day, and was in police custody at the time Janette Cullins is believed to have been murdered.

Also on April 12, the body of Bonnie Ann Guthrie was discovered on the floor of her apartment in Culver City by her landlord, who had entered her unit the previous day to make repairs, though erroneously believed Guthrie to be asleep and left. Like the previous victims, Guthrie had been sexually assaulted, she had died from asphyxia caused by strangulation, and personal items were missing from her apartment. Guthrie's purse was recovered by San Diego police officers on April 14. According to police, Carter had an appointment to see Guthrie, who operated a sweater-knitting business.

According to police, Carter had met Knoll, Mills, and Guthrie at a bar in Santa Monica and likely dated Knoll for some time.

On April 14, the body of Janette Anne Cullins was found in the bedroom closet of her San Diego apartment. Her cause of death was the same as that of the other victims, and the presence of woodchips on the floor near the front door indicated that someone had pried it open. Friends and family of Cullins stated that she had met Carter two months earlier at a bar in the Pacific Beach area and rejected his subsequent repeated attempts to contact her. Cheri Phinney, who had moved into Cullins' apartment in the second week of April, would later testify that on April 12, they had been unexpectedly visited by Carter, who stayed for around an hour. That night, Cullins and her friend Cathleen Tiner attended a San Diego Symphony concert and then went to a restaurant. They subsequently returned to Tiner's apartment and watched television until 11:00 p.m., after which Cullins left to return to her own apartment; she was not seen alive again.

Video surveillance captured Carter withdrawing $60 from Cullins' bank account at an ATM in Point Loma, San Diego, wearing a sweater knitted by Bonnie Guthrie. On the day her body was discovered, Cullins' father noticed her vehicle parked more than a block away from her apartment. On the morning of that same day, Cullins' wallet was discovered in bushes in Point Loma; it contained driver's licenses and identification cards belonging to both Cullins and Guthrie.

Carter is believed to also be responsible for the death of a fifth woman, Tok Chum Kim, a hairdresser he met at a bar in Lafayette on April 1, 1984. Kim's decomposed body was found by police on the bedroom floor of her apartment on April 13, she had been strangled with a curtain tie, and her vehicle and some of her personal items were missing. Kim's vehicle was discovered parked in front of the apartment where the bodies of Knoll and Mills were found.

The names of Susan Loyland, Janette Cullins, Cathleen Tiner, Susan Knoll, and Polly Haisha were all later discovered in Carter's address book.

Moreover, Carter was suspected in at least thirty murders and four rapes committed on the West Coast of the United States, and was initially suspected in the Green River murders in Washington. Although Carter was ultimately never charged in relation to any of these cases, he was identified as a strong suspect in rapes in the Seattle area, and police intended to question Carter in connection with sexual assaults in Honolulu.

== Arrest ==
On April 17, Carter was pulled over by an Arizona highway patrol officer who observed him driving Mills' vehicle erratically near Ash Fork, Arizona, and performed a traffic stop, which ended with Carter being arrested without incident. Inside the vehicle, police found various personal items belonging to Carter's victims. Carter was booked for driving under the influence, making unsafe lane changes, and driving without a license.

== Trials ==
On July 16, 1989, during a trial in Los Angeles, Carter was convicted of the murders of Knoll, Mills, and Guthrie, as well as two rapes. He was sentenced to death via gas chamber three weeks later.

At a subsequent trial in Ventura, Carter was convicted of Cullins' murder and received an additional death sentence, in addition to being found guilty of burglary and robbery of Cullins. Carter was also found guilty of rape, burglary, and robbery in connection with his attack on Susan Loyland's roommate, for which he received a 56-year sentence. Additionally, Carter received a consecutive sentence of 21 years and 8 months for his attack on Jennifer Rose Steward.

== Imprisonment ==
During his time on death row, Carter wrote and published an Internet blog, "Deadman Talking", with the help of a friend outside of prison. Although Carter avoided discussing his case in the blog and largely focused on his life on death row and thoughts on current events, he maintained his innocence. According to Carter, he began writing the columns to provide "a reasonably coherent account of what it is like from where I sit".

Carter claimed ineffective assistance of counsel, citing multiple disagreements with his attorneys, though his sentence was upheld in a ruling on December 26, 2019.

== See also ==
- List of death row inmates in the United States
- Capital punishment in California
