= Sarah Knott (historian) =

English historian and academic

Professor Sarah Knott FRHistS
- Born: 1972 (age 53–54)
- Occupations: Historian and academic
- Title: Hillary Rodham Clinton Professor of Women's History

Academic background
- Education: Colchester Royal Grammar School
- Alma mater: Magdalen College, Oxford; University of Pennsylvania; St Hugh's College, Oxford
- Thesis: A cultural history of sensibility in the era of the American Revolution (1999)

Academic work
- Discipline: History
- Sub-discipline: Women's history; Gender history; Early American history; Age of Revolution; Feminist history; Age of Enlightenment
- Institutions: Indiana University Bloomington; St John's College, Oxford
- Notable works: Mother: An Unconventional History (2019)

Sarah C. Knott FRHistS (born 1972) is an English historian of women, gender and maternity, and of America and the Atlantic world since the seventeenth century. She is the Hillary Rodham Clinton Professor of Women's History at the University of Oxford and a Professorial Fellow of St John's College.

== Education ==
Knott was educated at Colchester Royal Grammar School before completing her undergraduate studies at Magdalen College, Oxford, graduating in 1993. She moved to the University of Pennsylvania to earn her MA on a Thouron Scholarship, but returned to Oxford for her DPhil. Her doctoral work explored the concept of sensibility during the American Revolution and was completed in 1999 at St Hugh's College.

== Career ==
After earning her doctorate Knott worked as a research fellow on the Leverhulme Trust-funded project "Feminism and Enlightenment 1650-1850: A Comparative History" which was directed by Barbara Taylor and sponsored by both the University of East London and Royal Holloway, University of London. In 2005, Taylor and Knott published an edited collection based on their research, Women, Gender and Enlightenment, with Palgrave Macmillan.

Funding for the project ended in 2001, at which point Knott joined the faculty of Indiana University Bloomington as Assistant Professor of History. She was promoted to Associate Professor in 2008, and became the Sally M. Reahard Professor of History in 2020. During her time at the university she was a fellow of the Kinsey Institute for Research in Sex, Gender and Reproduction and a visiting senior research fellow of the Rothermere American Institute at the University of Oxford. She also held a Mellon postdoctoral research fellowship at the Omohundro Institute of Early American History and Culture.

Knott's first monograph, based on her doctoral research, was published in 2009 by the University of North Carolina Press. In 2019 she published Mother: An Unconventional History with Sarah Crichton Books, which has since been translated into five languages. 2020 saw the publication of a supplement of the journal Past & Present titled Mothering's Many Labours, edited by Knott and Emma Griffin.

Knott has previously served as both associate and acting editor of the American Historical Review and has sat on the editorial board of Past & Present since 2013.

In August 2024, Knott returned to the University of Oxford as the second Hillary Rodham Clinton Professor of Women's History at St John's College, succeeding the inaugural holder of the chair, Brenda Elaine Stevenson.

=== Media work ===
Knott has reviewed books on the history of motherhood for The Guardian, The Times Literary Supplement and BBC History Magazine. She has also discussed conceptions of motherhood in the past on BBC Radio 4's Woman's Hour.

== Bibliography ==
=== Books ===
- Women, Gender and the Enlightenment (co-editor with Barbara Taylor; Basingstoke: Palgrave Macmillan, 2005)
- Sensibility and the American Revolution (Chapel Hill: University of North Carolina Press, 2009)
- Mother: An Unconventional History (New York: Sarah Crichton Books, 2019)
- Mothering's Many Labours (co-editor with Emma Griffin; Past & Present supplement: Oxford University Press, 2020)

=== Book chapters ===
- 'Benjamin Rush's Ferment: Enlightenment Medicine and Female Citizenship in Revolutionary America', in Barbara Taylor and Sarah Knott, eds., Women, Gender and Enlightenment (Basingstoke: Palgrave Macmillan, 2005), pp. 649-666

=== Journal articles ===
- 'Sensibility and the American War for Independence', The American Historical Review 109:1 (2004), pp. 19-40
- 'The Patient's Case: Sentimental Empiricism and Knowledge in the Early American Republic', William and Mary Quarterly 67:4 (2010), pp. 645-676
- 'Female Liberty? Sentimental Gallantry, Republican Womanhood, and Rights Feminism in the Age of Revolutions', William and Mary Quarterly 71:3 (2014), pp. 425-456
- 'Narrating the Age of Revolution', William and Mary Quarterly 73:1 (2016), pp. 3-36
- 'Theorizing and Historicizing Mothering's Many Labours', Past & Present 246 supplement 15 (2020), pp. 1-24
