= Killing of James Mincey Jr. =

1982 killing in Los Angeles, California

- Location: Los Angeles, California
- Date: April, 1982
- Victim: James Mincey Jr.
- Litigation: Civil lawsuit resulting in a $450,000 settlement

James Mincey Jr. died on April 5, 1982, in Los Angeles, California after being placed in a carotid hold while under arrest by the Los Angeles Police Department. While driving home on an early April night in 1982, Mincey Jr. was stopped by police officers for a cracked windshield and was issued a ticket. A few minutes later, a pursuit was initiated after Mincey Jr. failed to stop for the police again. He was acting under the suspicion that the police were harassing him, so he continued driving home. Once home, Mincey Jr. exited his vehicle and was sprayed with "tear gas" in his face. He broke free from the two arresting officer's grips and moved towards his home, while trying to clean his face.

Shortly after Mincey Jr. (whom officers incorrectly believed to be under the influence of PCP) broke away from the arresting officers' grip, backup officers arrived. The backup officers failed to arrest Mincey Jr. after he broke free from an arresting officer's grip yet again. Finally, one of the officers was able to use a carotid chokehold on Mincey Jr., who was promptly handcuffed. After cuffing him, he was put into the back of one of the original arresting officer's police car and was driven to the hospital in "under sixty seconds". By the time his pregnant girlfriend was able to reach him in the hospital, she thought that "[h]e was pretty much gone already". James Mincey Jr. was pronounced dead on April 5, 1982, due to "blunt force injury to the neck". A lawsuit was filed over Mincey Jr.'s death and his father was ultimately paid $450,000 after the Los Angeles City Council agreed to settle for that amount.

In response to James Mincey Jr.'s death and other deaths surrounding the use of chokeholds, the then-LAPD Police Chief, Daryl Gates, said "We may be finding that in some blacks when [a chokehold] is applied, the veins and arteries do not open as fast as they do in normal people". His comment sparked outrage among many residents of Los Angeles at the time.

== In the media ==
- Let It Fall: Los Angeles 1982–1992 (2017), documentary about civil unrest in Los Angeles between 1982 and 1992 by John Ridley, Jeanmarie Condon, and Melia Patria. The death of James Mincey Jr. is one of the many highlighted instances of the LAPD using excessive force in the documentary.
