= Gardena Police Department =

Law enforcement agency in California, US

Coordinates: 33°53′0″N 118°18′27″W

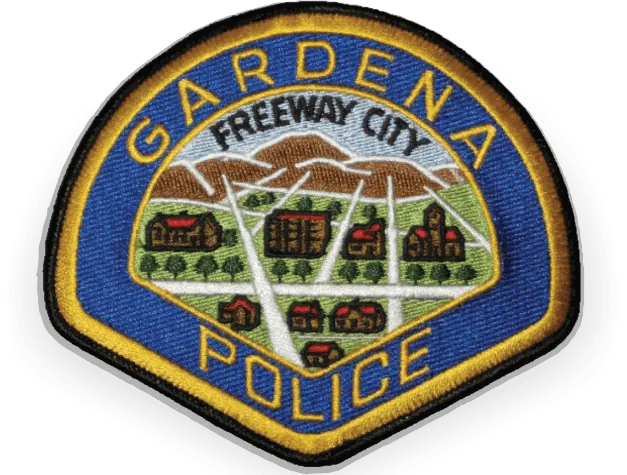
Gardena Police Patch

The Gardena Police Department is the principal law enforcement agency responsible for the city of Gardena, California, in the United States. The current Chief of Police is Michael Saffell, appointed in 2019. He was born and raised in the South Bay. He was one of the first District Commanders for GPD's award winning District Policing Program which began in 2007. Chief Saffell announced his retirement on April 29, 2025. After 32 years with the City of Gardena and 30 years as a police officer, Chief Saffell retired on June 6, 2025. Chief Todd Fox began his tenure on June 12, 2025.

The Gardena Police Department is located in the South Bay area of Los Angeles County, about 13 miles (21 km) south of Downtown Los Angeles, between the Harbor (I-110), San Diego (I-405) and Glenn Anderson (I-105) freeways. The city of Gardena encompasses an area of approximately 6 square miles (16 km^{2}) with a diverse population of nearly 60,000. The Police Department is funded for 115 full-time and 31 part-time employees. Of those, 91 are sworn positions with assignments in Patrol, Traffic, Motors, Detectives, Narco/Vice/Intelligence, Canine, Tactical Team, and various task forces.

Approximately, 60 sworn officers are assigned to either patrol, traffic, or the K-9 unit. Gardena Police leadership consists of a Police Chief, 2 Captains, 6 Lieutenants, and 14 Sergeants. Gardena has a SWAT team with 13 personnel and 5 Crisis Negotiators.

== Gardena Crime Accountability and Reduction Strategy ==
In 2006, the Gardena Police Department developed an innovative program for the prevention and investigation of criminal activity. The Gardena Crime Accountability and Reduction Strategy (GCARS) was developed to create a simple but effective method of distributing crime information in the form of maps and reports to affected personnel. GCARS uses real-time crime statistics to detect patterns and identify geographic areas which require increased police services. This information is disseminated to police personnel by various methods, including publishing the information through email, posting to an in-house Intranet, and printed for watch commanders prior to patrol shift deployments. The reports contain crime maps displaying current and 30-day trends with accompanying information about the crimes. The reports contain detailed information about crime descriptors, heavy police call-for-service locations, and a log through which all police employees share important information.

The system places a heavy emphasis on the use of technology and real-time information systems (computer statistics) to put police resources where they are needed to reduce and prevent crime. The foundation of this process creates an environment that puts officers back in the business of proactively fighting crime rather than just reacting to it. It also provides an opportunity for the department to be flexible in responding to emerging crime patterns.

The main focus of the strategy is to impact crime and disorder by using advanced technology to identify, track and categorize crime patterns in real-time so that the department can place appropriate resources where necessary to prevent and reduce crime. The department focuses its efforts to affect three identified sources of crime: high-risk people, high-risk places, and high-risk activities. It is believed that by targeting these contributing factors to crime overall safety in the community will be improved and the resources necessary to effective change will be minimized.

G-CARS is very similar to CompStat, which is a system of management accountability utilizing crime statistics to identify recent patterns in criminal activity. It is used by hundreds of law enforcement agencies in the United States.

== District policing ==
In 2007, the Gardena Police Department developed a district policing model. The city was divided into three districts, each managed by a police lieutenant. Each lieutenant has a team of specialized personnel that was brought together from various bureaus. A major goal of district policing is to localize efforts for better control of incidents of crime and the prevention of criminal activity.

Each district is led by a lieutenant, designated as the Area Commander. Along with the lieutenant, there is a sergeant, an officer from the COPPS (Community Oriented Policing and Problem Solving) Team, a Code Enforcement Officer, a detective from the Special Investigations Detail (narcotics), and a patrol officer from each of the four patrol teams assigned to each district.

These patrol officers provide 24/7 coverage in each of the three districts, and a designated contact point for citizens to voice their concerns and complaints. The strategy is to have those designated officers focus on their respective districts so the needs and problems relevant to those districts are addressed. These officers are held accountable for the service they provide to their districts, and likewise give residents confidence in the quality of that service.

== Communications ==
Radio communications and the 9-1-1 call center are handled by the South Bay Regional Public Communications Authority located in Hawthorne, California. South Bay RCC is a joint powers authority owned by the cities of Gardena, Hawthorne, and Manhattan Beach while also providing communication services under contract to the cities of Culver City, El Segundo, and Hermosa Beach. South Bay RCC processes around 300,000 police and fire calls annually.

== Controversy ==
On June 2, 2013, Ricardo Diaz Zeferino was fatally shot by three Gardena police officers eight times, and another man was injured by one bullet. The men were involved in the report of a stolen bicycle, and were ordered to have their hands on their head. Seferino made a sudden movement and officers fired at him, although no weapon was found on him. Los Angeles County prosecutors declined to file charges against the three officers. The families of Seferino and the man wounded in the shooting received $4.7 million in a lawsuit settlement against the city of Gardena. Footage of the incident was released to the public on July 15, 2015.
