= Attack on Reginald Denny =

Racially motivated attack during the 1992 L.A. riots

- Part of 1992 Los Angeles riots
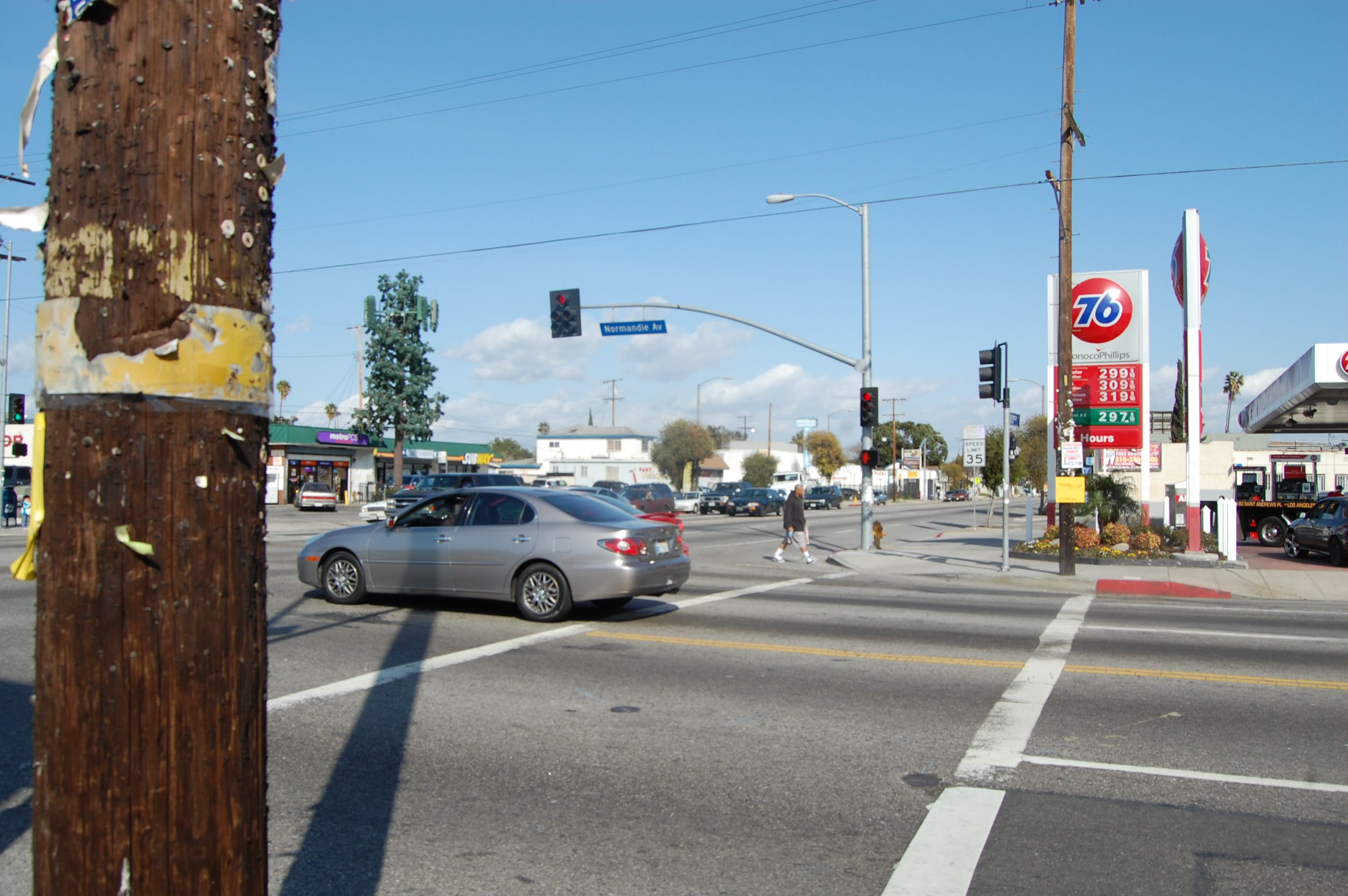
- Looking east from the southwestern corner of Florence and Normandie Avenues, in March 2010
- Date: April 29, 1992
- Time: 6:46 pm
- Location: Los Angeles, California, U.S.; 33°58′28″N 118°18′01″W
- Target: Reginald Denny

Reginald Oliver Denny (born 1953) is a former construction truck driver who was pulled from his truck and severely beaten during the 1992 Los Angeles riots. His attackers, a group of black men who came to be known as the "L.A. Four", targeted Denny because he was white. The attack was captured on video by a news helicopter and broadcast live on U.S. national television.

Four other black L.A. residents who had witnessed the attack on live television came to Denny's aid, placing him back in his truck and driving him to the hospital. Denny suffered a fractured skull and impairment of his speech and ability to walk, for which he underwent years of rehabilitative therapy. After unsuccessfully suing the City of Los Angeles, Denny moved to Arizona, where he worked as an independent boat mechanic and has mostly avoided media contact.

== Background ==
Denny was born in 1953 in Lansing, Michigan. His parents moved to Sylmar, Los Angeles, when he was a child. At the time of the attack, Denny worked as a truck driver in Los Angeles.

On March 3, 1991, an amateur video recording showed Rodney King, a black motorist, being badly beaten by Los Angeles Police Department officers during an arrest. The outrage resulting from the acquittal of these police officers was the principal cause of the 1992 Los Angeles riots.

== Attack ==
Damian Williams throwing a cinder block at Denny's head, then executing a football-style victory dance.

On April 29, 1992, at 5:39 p.m., Denny loaded his red dump truck with 27 short tons (24 t) of sand to be delivered to a plant in Inglewood. On the way, he left the Harbor Freeway and took a familiar shortcut along Florence Avenue. He was listening to the radio, "probably KKLA, a Christian channel," Denny said, "or country station KZLA." At 6:46 p.m., after he entered the intersection of Florence and Normandie Avenue, rioters threw rocks at his windows, and he heard people shouting for him to stop, forcing him to do so in the middle of the street.

Video footage taken from a helicopter by freelance journalists Zoey Tur (then known as Bob Tur) and Marika Gerrard showed Denny being pulled from his truck and beaten with fists, kicked, and struck with a cinder block before being rescued by four nearby residents. Timothy Goldman, a local resident who was filming on the ground at the corner of Florence and Normandie Avenues, captured a part of the scene. The attack has been described as a hate crime in which Denny, a white man, was targeted in response to police brutality against King and the failure of the criminal justice system to protect King's civil rights.

Antoine Miller climbed up and opened the truck door, giving an unidentified man the chance to pull Denny out and throw him on the ground. Henry Watson stood on Denny's neck to hold him down as a group of men surrounded him, and Anthony Brown kicked him in the abdomen. As Watson walked away, two other unidentified men joined in the attack: one hurled a five-pound oxygenator stolen from Larry Tarvin's truck at Denny's head, and the other kicked him and hit him with a claw hammer. News footage showed Damian Williams throwing a cinder block at Denny's head, then doing a football-style victory dance in the road and gesticulating gang signs. After the beating ended, some men threw beer bottles at Denny and a man searched his back pockets, taking his wallet. Tur and Gerrard, observing the beating from their helicopter, reported that there were no police in the area.

Four black residents of South Central Los Angeles, Bobby Green Jr., Lei Yuille, Titus Murphy, and Terri Barnett, who had been watching the events on television, came to Denny's aid. Green, also a truck driver, boarded Denny's truck and drove him to the Daniel Freeman Hospital in Inglewood. Murphy would later say, "Something inside me said, 'Get up; you have to do something.'" Paramedics who attended to Denny said he suffered major trauma and came very close to dying. Soon after Green took him to the hospital, Denny suffered a seizure. His skull was fractured in 91 places and pushed into his brain. His left eye was so badly dislocated that it would have fallen into his sinus cavity had the surgeons not replaced the crushed bone with a piece of plastic. A crater remained in his forehead despite efforts to correct it.

== The "L.A. Four" ==
The "L.A. Four" was a nickname given to the first four men charged with the attack on Denny: Damian Williams, Henry Watson, Antoine Miller, and Gary Williams.

Damian Monroe Williams (born March 17, 1973) was considered the most high-profile member of the four. Nicknamed "Football", he was a high-school football star before dropping out in the 10th grade. Williams was identified on the video recording thanks to a large tattoo on his left arm related to the Crips street gang. He was mentioned in news reports and court records as a member of the 71 Hustlers, an affiliation of the Eight Trey Gangster Crips. Williams had several juvenile arrests but no convictions. His friends recalled him as being generous to children and devoted to caring for an older brother who had been beaten in a robbery. Williams faced the most serious charges of the four, including attempted murder, assault, and aggravated mayhem. His jury acquitted him on the charges and instead convicted him of only four misdemeanors and simple mayhem. He was given the maximum sentence of 10 years, but was paroled after serving four years. After his release, he was convicted in 2003 of second degree murder for his role in the 2000 killing of Grover Tinner, which took place at a house suspected of being used for selling narcotics. The victim's sister disputed that Williams had shot at Tinner, and a coalition of community and religious leaders demanded his release, saying he was being targeted because of his involvement in the Denny case. He was ultimately convicted for participating in a crime resulting in a homicide and sentenced to 41 years in prison. As of 2007 he was incarcerated in Pelican Bay State Prison.

Henry Keith Watson was a 27-year-old former US Marine and ex-convict who had served time for armed robbery. After his release from prison, he married, had a daughter, and was working two jobs at the time of the attack.

Antoine Eugene Miller (May 5, 1972 – February 8, 2004) was a 19-year-old who lived with Damian Williams' family. Miller's mother was not able to care for him, so as a child, Miller was sent to live with his grandmother. When he was 12, his grandmother killed his grandfather during an argument and was convicted of his murder, leaving Miller homeless. Miller had previously been arrested for misdemeanor drug charges, joyriding, and failing to appear in court. He pleaded guilty to felonious assault of Reginald Denny and two misdemeanor charges in exchange for 27 months probation and no prison time. Miller was shot and killed at age 31 in a Hollywood nightclub in February 2004.

Gary Anthony Williams was a 33-year-old man described as a "drifter" and a "hustler" who begged at a local gas station. Although he claimed to work there, his arrest record listed him as unemployed. Williams pleaded guilty to grand theft and was sentenced to three years in prison.

== Trials ==
On May 12, outgoing Los Angeles police chief Daryl Gates started a search for three of Denny's attackers, who were identified from the video of the beating. Gates himself arrested Damian Williams, while other officers arrested Henry Watson and Antoine Miller. Soon afterward, Gary Williams gave himself up to the police. The four arrested men were suspected to be part of the 83 Gangster Crips.

Defense attorney Johnnie Cochran was first asked to represent the men accused, but he refused. When approached to represent Denny, he agreed.

Judge John W. Ouderkirk granted Miller a separate trial on the grounds that the strong evidence against Watson and Damian Williams could harm his case; Miller was sentenced to 17 months in jail and 27 months on probation. Gary Williams was sentenced to three years in jail for attempting to rob Denny and assaulting another man.

Edi M.O. Faal was Damian Williams' defense attorney, and Earl C. Broadly was Henry Watson's. On July 28, 1993, Watson's and Williams' trial began. The two were charged with the assault of Denny as well as five other motorists and two firefighters who were driving past the intersection of Florence and Normandie shortly after the start of the Los Angeles riots on April 29. At the trial, Denny faced his attackers for the first time since they had assaulted him. On August 12, 1993, a jury of five whites, three blacks, three Latinos, and one Asian was chosen.

On August 19, Deputy District Attorney Lawrence Morrison delivered the opening statement and a week later, the videotape of the beating was shown. The doctors who treated Denny testified, describing his wounds and their efforts to treat them. Next to testify were witnesses of the beating and Denny's rescuers. The prosecution rested on September 17, 1993. The defense began pleading on September 20, making a case for unpremeditated assault, with Faal challenging the video evidence and portraying Williams as a victim of poverty and racism. In the closing arguments, the defense attorneys claimed that Williams and Watson were being used as scapegoats for the L.A. riots. The prosecution counter-argued that the two had knowingly tried to kill Denny and were not victims.

Williams' lawyers successfully argued that he had not intended to kill Denny; he was found not guilty of attempted murder, assault, and aggravated mayhem, and convicted of four misdemeanors and simple mayhem, while Watson was convicted of a single misdemeanor assault charge. During a break in the trial, Denny approached Williams' mother, Georgiana, and hugged her. Watson was given credit for time served and was sentenced to three years' probation for the assaults of Denny and truck driver Larry Tarvin. Williams was denied bail and sentenced to a maximum of ten years for the assaults of Denny and four other people on December 7, 1993.

== Aftermath ==
Denny sought to soothe racial tensions associated with his assault, reminding reporters that most of his rescuers were black, as were the doctors who treated him. He became friends with the four people who saved him, and Green was hired by Denny's employer Transit Mixed. Denny also sought to make peace with his attackers' families, saying that Watson had "been through quite enough" having been jailed for 17 months awaiting trial. Watson later apologized to Denny during an appearance on the Phil Donahue Show, where the pair shook hands.

As a result of the injuries he suffered during the attacks, Denny had to undergo years of rehabilitative therapy, and his speech and ability to walk were also damaged. During his recovery, he received over 27,000 get-well cards from supportive members of the community. After unsuccessfully suing the city of Los Angeles, Denny moved to Arizona to work as an independent boat motor mechanic. Denny has largely avoided the media and has rarely spoken publicly about his ordeal.

In 1997, Damian Williams was released from prison early for good behavior, but in 2003, he was sentenced to 46 years to life in prison for the 2000 murder of drug dealer Grover Tinner. As of 2017, he is incarcerated at Centinela State Prison. Watson was re-arrested and sentenced to three years for a narcotics conviction and, after his release, owned and operated a limousine service in Los Angeles. On February 1, 2004, Antoine Miller was shot outside of a Hollywood nightclub during an altercation and died in Cedars-Sinai Medical Center on February 8 at the age of 31. Gary Williams, Henry Watson, and Damian Williams gave interviews about their participation in the riots for the 2017 documentary Let It Fall: Los Angeles 1982–1992. During the interview, Williams expressed remorse and explained that he hopes to one day meet Denny to apologize.

== Related litigation ==
Video footage of Denny's beating was taken from a helicopter by Zoey Tur and Marika Gerrard, freelance reporters who ran the independent Los Angeles News Service (LANS). LANS sued several television stations that rebroadcast their footage for copyright infringement; at least one of these lawsuits was successful.

LANS sued YouTube in the United States District Court for the Central District of California for copyright infringement in July 2006. LANS alleged in the lawsuit that, in the space of one week, a version of the video uploaded by a YouTube user was viewed over 1,000 times via the site. They argued this hurt their ability to license the video. YouTube requested summary judgment based on DMCA safe harbor, which was denied. LANS voluntarily dismissed the case without prejudice, planning to join a class action against YouTube in New York. YouTube appealed both the dismissal and the summary judgment ruling. However, the United States Court of Appeals for the Ninth Circuit dismissed the appeal.
