= Dai Sil Kim-Gibson =

Korean-American filmmaker (1938–2023)

- Born: Dai Sil Kim; 1938; Sincheon, Hwanghae Province, North Korea
- Died: October 22, 2023 (age 85)
- Education: Boston University
- Occupation: Documentary filmmaker
- Years active: 1988–2014
- Notable work: Sai-I-Gu, A Forgotten People: The Sakhalin Koreans, Silence Broken: Korean Comfort Women, People are the Sky
- Spouse: Don Gibson (m. 1979; died 2009)

Dr. Dai Sil Kim-Gibson (/'daɪ/ /'sɪl/ /'kɪm/-/'gɪbsən/; (1938 – October 22, 2023) was a Korean–American documentary filmmaker and author. Her films and writing focus on humanizing "the voiceless" within issues of human rights, overlooked periods in history, and Asian-American diaspora.

Kim-Gibson is well known for her book and film of the same name, Silence Broken: Korean Comfort Women. Both the book and the film are award-winning historical accounts of Korean women forced into sexual servitude by the Japanese army during World War II.

Kim-Gibson has been recognized and funded by The Rockefeller Fellowship, the Corporation for Public Broadcasting, and the MacArthur Foundation. Her awards and honors include the Asian American Media Arts Award, the Kodak Filmmaker Award, and CINE Golden Eagle.

== Early life ==
Kim-Gibson was born in 1938 in Sincheon, Hwanghae Province, in an area which would later become part of North Korea after the division of the peninsula but at the time was part of a colonial administration of imperial Japan. Kim-Gibson's early life coincided with the end of Japanese rule in Korea and World War II. During World War II, Korea was forced to support Japan's military, and 200,000 Korean and Chinese women and girls were forced into sexual slavery and labeled as "comfort women." The history of Korea during this era has been a frequent subject of Kim's work.

In 1945, at the age of seven, Kim-Gibson moved with her family, on foot, across the 38th parallel seeking democracy in South Korea. Her family was deeply committed to the Korean independence movement and to Christianity.

=== Education ===
Kim-Gibson attended the Ewha Girls' High School in Seoul, and obtained her master's degree in Theological Studies from the Methodist Theological Seminary in Seoul in 1960. In 1962, Kim-Gibson moved to Boston, Massachusetts to attend Boston University, where she obtained her PhD in Religious studies. She published her PhD dissertation in 1969, titled "The Doctrine of Man in Irenaeus of Lyon."

== Career ==
After graduating from Boston University, Kim-Gibson taught religion at Mount Holyoke College from 1969 to 1978.

In 1978, Kim-Gibson began work at the National Endowment for the Humanities working on media programming grants. While working at NEH, she met and worked with Don Gibson, whom she later married.

From 1986 to 1988, Kim-Gibson worked as the Director of Media Programs for the New York State Council on the Arts. She left NYSCA in 1988 to begin freelance work as a filmmaker and author.

The first film Kim-Gibson was involved in was released in 1991. America Becoming was sponsored by the Ford Foundation and directed by Charles Burnett. Kim-Gibson co-wrote the film with Burnett. The film considered growing diversity in America through the stories of newcomers and established residents in six American cities.

In 1993, Kim-Gibson and two other Korean-American women, Christine Choy and Elaine Kim, released the documentary film Sa-I-Gu. Sa-i-gu is Korean for April 29, the date the Rodney King riot began in Los Angeles in 1992. Sa-I-Gu uses newsreel footage and interviews with Korean-American shopkeepers to tell the story of the King riots from their unique perspective. The film was aired by PBS as part of its independent film series POV (TV series) on September 10, 1993. Her 2004 film Wet Sand: Voices from LA (2004) also deals with the aftermath of the Rodney King riots.

Kim-Gibson's third film was released in 1995, titled A Forgotten People: The Sakhalin Koreans. A Forgotten People tells the story of 43,000 Koreans who were brought by the Japanese to Sakhalin Island during World War II to be used in forced labor.

In 1999, Kim-Gibson released a book about the history of Korean comfort women during WWII, and the impact upon the women's lives. Kim-Gibson's film Silence Broken: Korean Comfort Women was released in 2000.

In 2014, Kim-Gibson's most personal film – People Are The Sky—was released. Kim-Gibson returned to North Korea for the first time in almost 70 years for the film, exploring the social history of North and South Korea through her own story. The film uses "interviews, epic images, and graceful musings" to provide history and explore if North Korea is "still home."

=== Film festivals ===
In 2011, the fifth-annual Korean American Film festival honored Kim-Gibson in Manhattan with a six-film retrospective and discussions led by her long-time collaborator, Charles Burnett.

In 2016, the United States' longest-running Asian film festival—the Asian American International Film Festival—featured Kim-Gibson's film People are the Sky.

The Los Angeles Asian Pacific Film Festival honored Kim-Gibson with the Artist Spotlight award in 2016 for People are the Sky.

=== Book ===
- Silence Broken: Korean Comfort Women (Mid-Prairie Books, 1999)

=== Filmography ===
- America Becoming (Writer, 1991)
- Sa-I-Gu (Co-director, producer, 1993)
- A Forgotten People: The Sakhalin Koreans (Director, producer, 1995)
- Silence Broken: Korean Comfort Women (Director, producer, writer, 2000)
- Wet Sand: Voices from LA (Director, producer, 2003)
- Motherland: Cuba Korea USA (Director, producer, 2006)
- People are the Sky (Director, producer, star, 2014)

== Personal life ==
Kim-Gibson met her future husband, Donald Gibson, while working at NEH and the two were wed on October 1, 1979. They remained married until Gibson's death in 2009.

In 2013, Don Gibson's posthumous memoir Iowa Sky was published by Shoulder Friends Press. The book was compiled and annotated by Kim-Gibson who described their partnership as that of soulmates.

"Shoulder friends" was a term Kim-Gibson and her husband used to describe their close relationship. The term is a direct translation from the Korean word ‘eogaedongmu,' meaning friends who can put their arms around each other's shoulder.

Dr. Dai Sil Kim-Gibson died on October 22, 2023 at the age of 85.
