= Culver City Police Department =

City agency serving Culver City, California

- Abbreviation: CCPD

Agency overview
- Formed: November 21, 1917; 108 years ago
- Annual budget: Approximately $51 million

Jurisdictional structure
- Operations jurisdiction: Culver City, California, USA

Operational structure
- Headquarters: 4040 Duquesne Avenue, Culver City, California 90232
- Sworn members: 113
- Unsworn members: 55
- Agency executives: Jason Sims, Chief of Police; Sam Agaiby, Captain; Troy Dunlap, Captain

Facilities
- Stations: 1

Website
- culvercitypd.org

The Culver City Police Department (CCPD) is the police department in Culver City, California.

The CCPD is a full-service police department and includes more than 160 persons on staff, and serves an area of 5.33 square miles (13.8 km^{2}). The Police Chief is Jason Sims.

== History ==
The Culver City Police Department was founded on November 21, 1917, when the City Trustees provided for the employment of a City Marshal in their 5th resolution. As a result, Frank W. Bradley started work on November 21, 1917. The department did not function as a full-service police department, using the County Jail for prisoners, and having only temporary police officers. Walter Shaw was appointed the first municipal Chief of Police in 1926.

Since the department was formed in 1917, it has had two officers killed in the line of duty, both by traffic accidents. One of the officers from the Rodney King incident, former LAPD officer Timothy Wind was subsequently employed between 1994 and 2000 as one of its community service officers, before leaving California in 2000 for Indiana.

== Police Chief ==
In 2020, Manuel Cid was appointed as the Department’s 26th Police Chief, becoming the youngest and first Latino / Hispanic Police Chief in the Department’s history. Chief Cid announced his resignation as Chief of Police in January 2023. Assistant Chief Jason Sims will assume the role as acting Chief until a new Chief can be selected.

== Fallen Officers ==
In the over 100 year history of the Culver City Police Department, there has been two police officers that have lost their lives in the line of duty. Sergeant Curtis Massey was killed in a traffic collision in 2009 and Officer Alonzo H. Garwood in a motorcycle accident while conducting traffic enforcement in 1921.

== Specialized Units ==
- Bike Patrol
- Drone Pilot
- Narcotics / Vice
- ERT
- K-9
- Special Events
- Motorcycle Enforcement
- Drill Instructor
- Task Force
- Commercial Enforcement
- Detectives / Investigations
- Jailer
- Reserve Police
- Animal Services
- Parking Enforcement
- Automated Enforcement
- IT

== Employee Organization ==
The Culver City Police Officers' Association represents officers and sergeants of the Culver City Police Department while the Culver City Police Management Group represents the lieutenants and command officers.
