= Let It Fall: Los Angeles 1982–1992 =

- Directed by: John Ridley
- Produced by: Jeanmarie Condon; Melia Patria; John Ridley
- Cinematography: Sam Painter
- Edited by: Colin Rich
- Music by: Mark Isham
- Production company: Lincoln Square Productions
- Distributed by: ABC Studios
- Release date: April 21, 2017
- Running time: 144 minutes
- Country: United States
- Languages: English; Korean

Let It Fall: Los Angeles 1982–1992 is a 2017 American documentary film directed by John Ridley about the decade preceding and including the 1992 Los Angeles riots (also known as the Rodney King riots). It was produced by Lincoln Square Productions, a subsidiary of ABC News, and was released in theaters in Los Angeles and New York on April 21, 2017. A shorter version aired on ABC on April 28, 2017. A rebroadcast of the film took place on June 16, 2020. The film has received critical acclaim.

== Overview ==
Let It Fall: Los Angeles 1982–1992 is a deep examination of a tumultuous decade in the city of Los Angeles, starting with the death of James Mincey Jr. and continuing through the 1984 Summer Olympics; the rise of street gangs; the crack epidemic; the death of Karen Toshima; Operation Hammer; the raid at 39th and Dalton; the beating of Rodney King; the death of Latasha Harlins; and the trial of Laurence Powell, Timothy Wind, Theodore Briseno, and Stacey Koon in the Rodney King beating; and culminating with the unrest that ensued after their acquittal. Regarding the unrest, the film chronicles the events at the Simi Valley Courthouse; the withdrawal of all police officers at 71st and Normandie; rioting at Florence and Normandie; the attack and rescue of Soi Chai Soi, Larry Tarvin, and Reginald Denny; the spread of violence and arson throughout the city; looting in Koreatown; the arming of Korean merchants; the death of Jae Song "Eddie" Lee; the deployment of the 7th Infantry Division; and the charging of Damien "Football" Williams, Henry "Kiki" Watson, Antoine "Twon" Miller, and Gary Williams for the beating of Reginald Denny.

Along with extensive archival footage, the story is told through first-hand accounts of the events. Among those interviewed are police officers, city officials, victims of police violence, citizen 'rescuers,' those who perpetrated violence, as well as witnesses and family members to the deceased.

Neighborhoods and cities in Greater Los Angeles that receive specific focus in the film include South Central Los Angeles, Pacoima, Alhambra, Westwood, Koreatown, and Simi Valley.

== Interviews ==
- Donnell Alexander, witness to violence at Florence and Normandie
- Marjean Banks, girlfriend to James Mincey, Jr.
- Marvin Covault, general in the US Army's 7th Infantry Division
- Lakeisha Combs, witness to the killing of Latasha Harlins
- Thomas Elfmont, LAPD commanding officer at 39th and Dalton
- Timothy Goldman, videographer at Florence and Normandie Ave
- Bobby Green, rescuer of Reginald Denny
- Linda Griego, deputy mayor
- Kee Wan Ha, Korean shop owner
- Mark Jackson, brother of Damian "Football" Williams, arrestee at 71st and Normandie
- Paul Jefferson, LAPD area captain at Florence and Normandie
- Donald Jones, rescuer of Soi Chai Soi
- Henry King, juror in The People v. Laurence Powell
- Jenny Lee, brother of Edward Jae Song "Eddie" Lee
- Jung Hui Lee, mother of Edward Jae Song "Eddie" Lee
- Michael Moulin, LAPD incident commander 71st and Normandie
- Lisa Phillips, LAPD winner of medal of valor
- Robert Simpach, LAPD arresting officer of James Mincey, Jr. and witness to beating of Rodney King
- Juanita Tarvin, wife of Larry Tarvin
- Kevin Toshima, brother of Karen Toshima
- Henry "Kiki" Watson, member of the L.A. Four
- Terry White, prosecutor in the People v. Laurence Powell, et al.
- Damian "Football" Williams, member of the L.A. Four
- Georgiana Williams, mother of Damian "Football" Williams and Mark Jackson
- Gary Williams, member of the L.A. Four

The film also uses archival interviews of persons deceased or unreachable at the time of production, including Los Angeles Mayor Tom Bradley; LAPD Chief Daryl Gates; Los Angeles City Council member Zev Yaroslavsky, victim of police beating Rodney King and his passengers Bryant Allen and Freddie Helms; Rodney King beating videographer George Holliday; beating victims Reginald Denny and Larry Tarvin; LAPD officers Laurence Powell, Timothy Wind, and Stacey Koon; shop owner David Joo; L.A. Four member Antoine "Twan" Miller; as well as numerous other witnesses and community members.

== Production ==
In 2007, Ridley was approached by Spike Lee to make a scripted, narrative film about the riots; with Brian Grazer producing, principal photography was set to begin in the spring of 2016. The film was never made, with Ridley saying, "the fact that it covered many communities, the fact that there was no one person who was a complete protagonist or a complete antagonist... and that it was not a necessarily happy ending, but the scope and scale of it begat a particular price point. All of those things, when you sit down with the individuals who have the decision-making power, it's not easy to look at that and go 'Yeah, okay, that's a movie that we want to make.'"

Elsewhere, Lincoln Square Productions was using a team of ABC News journalists, including former Nightline producer Jeanmarie Condon, to make an unrelated piece for the 25th anniversary of the L.A. riots. They approached Ridley to direct, and on December 16, 2016, Deadline Hollywood reported that the documentary was underway.

Because the full-length film played in theaters and a shorter version played on television, on May 10, 2017, Variety reported that the film's producers chose not to submit the TV version for the Primetime Emmy Awards, and would instead focus resources on an Academy Award campaign.

== Reception ==
Let It Fall: Los Angeles 1982–1992 has an approval rating of 100% on the review aggregator Rotten Tomatoes based on 22 reviews, with a weighted average of 8.3/10. On Metacritic, the film has a score of 92/100 based on 6 reviews.

The New York Times praised the film's construction, saying, "the multiethnic oral history allows politicians and the police, victims and survivors who witnessed the events of April 29 and 30, 1992, to expose a relentless accretion of official decisions and public resentments." Vogue magazine commented, "Let It Fall, in the broadest sense, is about memory: what we remember, how we remember it, and how the collective accretion of individual memories can illuminate the complexity of history in a way that official institutional memory cannot."

== Awards ==
The film was awarded by National Board of Review alongside Angelina Jolie's First They Killed My Father with the 2017 NBR Freedom of Expression Award. The Indiana Film Journalists Association gave it a 2017 IFJA Award for Best Documentary. The film also received an Alfred I. duPont-Columbia University Award, a Sigma Delta Chi Award from the Society of Professional Journalists, and a Robert F. Kennedy Journalism Award from the Robert F. Kennedy Center for Justice and Human Rights. It received nominations at the 39th News & Documentary Emmy Awards, for Outstanding Historical Documentary and Outstanding Research.

== See also ==
- LA 92 - the Emmy-winning collage film also released the same year
- OJ: Made in America - 2016 Oscar-winning documentary similar in content
