= Outline of the history of Los Angeles =

The following outline is provided as an overview of and topical guide to the city of Los Angeles:

Los Angeles – city also known as LA or simply "The City of Angels," that has a rich history dating back to the 1780s. The area was first settled by Spanish colonizers, who named it "El Pueblo de Nuestra Señora la Reina de los Ángeles del Río Porciúncula," which translates to "The Town of Our Lady the Queen of the Angels of the Porciúncula River." The city grew slowly during the Spanish and Mexican periods, but began to develop more rapidly after California became a US state in 1850. During the late 19th and early 20th centuries, LA became a major center for oil production and manufacturing, and its population exploded as people moved to the area for jobs. The city continued to grow in the second half of the 20th century, becoming a cultural and economic powerhouse with a diverse population. Today, Los Angeles is one of the largest cities in the United States and is known for its entertainment industry, beaches, and diverse neighborhoods.

== Overviews ==
- History of African Americans in Los Angeles
- History of Armenian Americans in Los Angeles
- History of Central Americans in Los Angeles
- History of Iranian Americans in Los Angeles
- History of Israelis in Los Angeles
- History of the Japanese in Los Angeles
- History of Korean Americans in Greater Los Angeles
- History of Los Angeles
- History of Mexican Americans in Los Angeles
- History of the San Fernando Valley
- History of the Jews in Los Angeles
- Los Angeles in the 1920s
- History of the Los Angeles Police Department
- History of the University of California, Los Angeles

== Timelines ==
- Timeline of Los Angeles

== Lists ==
- National Register of Historic Places listings in Los Angeles
- List of Los Angeles Historic-Cultural Monuments in Downtown Los Angeles
- List of Los Angeles Historic-Cultural Monuments in Hollywood
- List of Los Angeles Historic-Cultural Monuments in Silver Lake, Angelino Heights, and Echo Park
- List of Los Angeles Historic-Cultural Monuments in South Los Angeles
- List of Los Angeles Historic-Cultural Monuments in the Harbor area
- List of Los Angeles Historic-Cultural Monuments in the San Fernando Valley
- List of Los Angeles Historic-Cultural Monuments in the Wilshire and Westlake areas
- List of Los Angeles Historic-Cultural Monuments on the East and Northeast Sides
- List of Los Angeles Historic-Cultural Monuments on the Westside
- List of museums in Los Angeles

== Topics ==
- Pueblo de Los Angeles
- Los Angeles Pobladores
- Tongva
- Los Angeles Railway
- Bloods
- Crips

== Events ==
- Baldwin Hills Dam disaster
- 1923 San Pedro maritime strike
- 1933 Griffith Park fire
- Los Angeles Garment Workers strike of 1933
- Battle of La Mesa
- 2022 Los Angeles City Council scandal
- June 2025 Los Angeles protests

=== Natural disasters ===
- 1933 Long Beach earthquake
- Los Angeles flood of 1938
- 1994 Northridge earthquake
- 1971 San Fernando earthquake
- 1987 Whittier Narrows earthquake
- 1971 San Fernando earthquake
- Crescenta Valley flood (1933 and 1934)
- January 2025 Southern California wildfires

=== Crime and violence ===
- Assassination of Robert F. Kennedy
- Bounty Hunter Watts Bloods
- Crips–Bloods gang war
- Death of Keenan Anderson
- Killing of Anthony Weber
- Killing of Ezell Ford
- Los Angeles Chinese massacre of 1871
- Pirus
- Shooting of Leonard Deadwyler
- Watts riots
- Watts truce

==== 1992 Los Angeles riots ====
- 1992 (film)
- Attack on Reginald Denny
- Killing of Latasha Harlins
- Stacey Koon
- The L.A. Riot Spectacular
- LA 92 (film)
- 1992 Los Angeles riots in popular culture
- The Riot Within
- Rooftop Koreans
- Beating of Rodney King

=== Elections ===
- 1973 Los Angeles mayoral election

== Transportation ==
=== Rail ===
- Historic Downtown Los Angeles Streetcar
- Plaza Substation
- Los Angeles Pacific Railroad
- Streetcars in Los Angeles

== Categories ==
- Category:Centuries in Los Angeles
- Category:Decades in Los Angeles
- Category:Years in Los Angeles
