= Sessilee Lopez =

American model

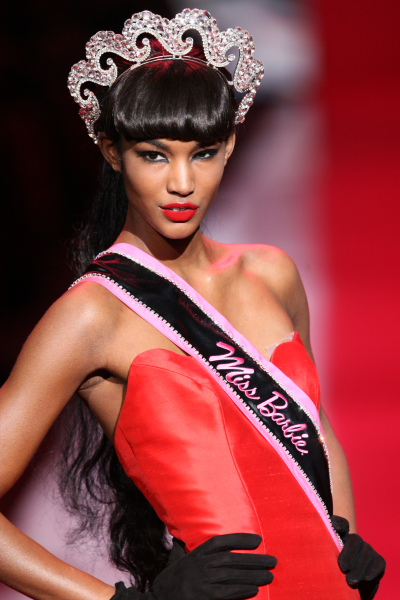
- Lopez in the Barbie 50th Anniversary show
- Born: January 4, 1989 (age 37); Philadelphia, Pennsylvania, U.S.
- Modeling information
- Height: 1.78 m (5 ft 10 in)
- Hair color: Black
- Eye color: Brown
- Agency: Major Model Management (New York City); Scoop Models (Copenhagen); Modelwerk (Hamburg); MP Stockholm (Stockholm)

Sessilee Lopez (born January 4, 1989) is an American model. She has appeared in Vogue and graced one of the four covers of its "All Black" issue.

== Career ==
Lopez is of Dominican descent. Her career started in 2004, when she signed with IMG Models. Sessilee is currently represented by Major Model Management. Her runway debut was at the Vivienne Tam and Daryl K Fall 2004 shows. In 2007, she switched representation to Major Model Management Worldwide. She has appeared in editorials for American, Italian, French, Japanese, and German Vogue, V Magazine, W Magazine, Allure, i-D, Dazed & Confused, Marie Claire, Numéro, Swedish, American, French Elle, and Spanish and American Harper's Bazaar. She has appeared on the covers of Vogue Italia, Harper's Bazaar, and French Numéro. She has been a muse for photographer Steven Meisel for years.

In September 2009, Lopez appeared alongside fellow models Arlenis Sosa, Chanel Iman, and Jourdan Dunn on the cover of I-D magazine. Lopez appeared in the 2008 and 2009 Victoria's Secret Fashion Show.

Lopez has walked the runways for Givenchy, Hermés, Dolce & Gabbana, Oscar De La Renta, Marc Jacobs, Karl Lagerfeld, Jean Paul Gaultier, Lanvin, Emporio Armani, Diane Von Furstenberg, Dries Van Noten, Rag & Bone, Tory Burch, Fendi, Carolina Herrera, Mulberry, Tommy Hilfiger, La Perla, Missoni, Vivienne Westwood, Alexander Wang, and Zac Posen.

She has appeared in advertising campaigns for Hermés, Calvin Klein, Lanvin, DKNY, Halston, Tommy Hilfiger, Gap, Uniqlo, Barneys New York, H&M, Benetton, Nordstrom, Macy's, Saks Fifth Avenue, Levi's, and MAC Cosmetics.

She appeared in the 2015 film, Supermodel with Tyson Beckford.

== Personal life ==
Sessilee has two sisters, Kristian Lorén (a fashion designer) and Latoya Mendez (a medical student). Sessilee appeared on Say Yes to the Dress: Big Bliss when her sister Latoya was trying on dresses, along with her mother, Janice Celeste (business woman and author).
