= 1923 San Pedro maritime strike =

California labor action

1923 San Pedro Maritime Strike
- Date: April 25, 1923 - May 24, 1923

Parties
IWW; Federation of Marine Transport Workers	Merchants’ and Manufacturers Association; San Pedro Chamber of Commerce; Los Angeles Police Department; KKK

Lead figures
Upton Sinclair	

The 1923 San Pedro maritime strike (also known as the Liberty Hill strike) was, at the time, the biggest challenge to the dominance of the open shop culture of Los Angeles, California until the rise of the Congress of Industrial Organizations in the 1930s.

The strike was led by members of the Industrial Workers of the World (IWW, or the "Wobblies") which bottled up shipping in the harbor. One of the largest staged protests during the strike was led by author Upton Sinclair on a small plot of land called Liberty Hill where he was arrested for reciting the First Amendment. It was eventually crushed by a combination of injunctions, mass arrests and vigilantism by both the police force and the Ku Klux Klan. There would not be another waterfront strike of this magnitude until the 1934 West Coast Waterfront Strike.

== Background ==
Labor relations in the Pacific coast maritime industry had been in almost constant turmoil since the turn of the century. The traditional craft unions of seaman and longshoremen, plagued by bureaucratic squabbles, the hostility of the Los Angeles Times, powerful employers’ groups such as the Merchants’ and Manufacturers Association were not able to change the culture of open shops in Los Angeles.

One of the most effective weapons used by open shops to combat radical forces was “decausualization,” which relied heavily on the use of company-controlled hiring halls to weed out as many union sympathizers as possible from working in the docks. Even with all the preventative measures put in place, members of the IWW were able to still infiltrate a vast amount of the docks on the West Coast under the guise of other organizations used as a front.

Although the IWW was able to gain access to the docks, they were not having too much success on the waterfronts of California until the start of World War I. The build-up leading to American involvement meant higher than normal output in all the ports, and a shortage of labor. In May 1916, the International Longshoremen’s Association began a dockworker’s strike for an increase in wages in Seattle, Washington. The dockworkers in San Pedro, totally about 1,600, came out on strike at the same time. The strike was quickly put down when the shop owners hired a special Los Angeles Police Department unit to work in the protections of strikebreakers to maintain an opened shop.

In October 1919, the San Pedro Chamber of Commerce let it known of their intention to fully restore completely open shop conditions through the entire harbor, a decision that was supported by all the shops and companies in the area, sparking yet another small strike that was broken up quickly. The local unions were not strong enough to resist San Pedro in becoming a complete open shop city and most of the local union leaders gave up the fight, but the IWW members who were there in town did not. Concerned with dwindling numbers in California the IWW’s general executive board in Chicago requested all remaining Wobblies on the West Coast to head down to San Pedro to help contest the open shop on the docks and the constitutional limits of California’s criminal syndicalism law.

The Industrial Workers of the World quickly sprung into action, and disrupted the Local No. 31-18. The actions did not do much in the attempt to displease the employers, but once the American Federation of Labor (AFL) was eliminated, the left-wingers became persona non grata. Efforts to keep Wobblies from dock employment were not successful. Although there were large amounts of IWW members under the new California criminal syndicalism law, there was still high levels of unrest on the San Pedro docks. There was a series of mini strikes in the early months of 1923 that kept several ships from sailing on time.

== The Strike ==
Liberty Hill, circa April or May 1923. Right background shows Terminal Island and then Southwestern Shipyard (forerunner to Bethlehem). The speaker on platform at left has been identified by Bob Bigelow as fellow worker F.W.Yelovich.

The strike began on April 25, 1923, shortly after the Los Angeles County Grand Jury held hearings on violations of the criminal syndicalism act. The San Pedro Local No. 510 called a strike and effectively tied up the port for several days. The walkout was national in scope, with its pivotal points in New York and Los Angeles; it brought out 5,000 men on the east coast and probably 1,500 locally, with estimates at San Pedro ranging as high as 3,000. It had little effect at other Western ports, however, though a number of Pacific Coast lumberjacks and oil workers participated and the independent Federation of Marine Transport Workers joined with the Wobblies. Members of the Sailors Union of the Pacific refused to support the strike, not only because it was IWW-inspired, but also because they were already "working the oracle" or, in other words, conducting a slowdown with some success. The strike itself was a peculiar combination of an ordinary economic walkout and a political maneuver. In its nationwide aspects, it sought to secure the release of political prisoners, particularly those accused of sedition against the federal government or held under the California Criminal Syndicalism Act.

The walkout tied up about ninety ships in the Port of Los Angeles. Police quickly started to round up known IWW agitators, thus depleting the ranks of strike leaders and permitting some ships to get under way. Twelve vessels in the offshore trade, manned by seamen sympathetic to the IWW, suffered the longest delays. The thirty-seven lumber schooners in port were largely manned by non-unionists or members of the Sailors Union. Nevertheless, the cargoes of a number of them had to be discharged in rotation at the piers by the ships' officers because of the shortage of dockhands.

Then the Wobblies through their newspaper the Industrial Worker made the call for a citywide strike on May 1, 1923 (the historic May Day of international socialism). They called the announcement to “free the class prisoners” which is the IWW term for those who had been convicted and jailed under the criminal syndicalism act. On the same day, IWW leaders persuaded approximately 450 of 2,200 men to strike at refinery construction jobs two miles north of the harbor, and it seemed likely that the dispute would spread beyond the water front. Employers therefore decided to take immediate action both to prevent this and to move ships more rapidly. Negotiations with the longshoremen, however, foundered on their demand for their own hiring hall and the abandonment of the Sea Service Bureau, or "Fink Hall," controlled by the stevedoring and shipping firms. Some 1,200 longshoremen voted to remain out until the employers met this basic request.

About 140 extra patrolmen and 20 detectives were dispatched to the docks by the Los Angeles Police Department to maintain order in the event of a showdown. On May 5 more than 100 strikebreakers arrived and were immediately put to work. Two hundred more were scheduled to begin employment on May 8 and an additional 750 were due a few days later. By May 10, 1,500 longshoremen were at work, of whom 350 were imported strikebreakers. The extra police force was increased to 250, largely because of a fire on May 5 which had obviously been the work of an arsonist.

As the strike entered its fourth week, the police cracked down even harder on the Wobblies. The Los Angeles headquarters of the KKK handed out a pamphlet to local citizens to get more supports and help the police force break up the strike. Members of the Ku Klux Klan, with or without their hoods regularly came to the San Pedro docks to be a force of intimidation. The latter began to look on the dispute as a free-speech fight and continued to hold meetings near the water front at a point known as Liberty Hill, a privately owned parcel of land used with the permission of the owner. Local sympathizers and members of the American Civil Liberties Union joined the IWW leaders in seeking to maintain rights of free speech. They included such prominent Los Angeles and Pasadena figures as Upton Sinclair.

San Pedro Court House where IWW strikers were jailed during the 1923 maritime strike. Jailings inspired Upton Sinclair to write his play, "The Singing Jailbirds." The building was demolished in the late 1920s.

In the early evening of May 15, 1923, Upton Sinclair stood before a crowd on Liberty Hill in San Pedro. He chose to honor the hill’s namesake by using words to test the boundary between liberty and sedition. He spoke, “Congress shall make no law respecting an establishment of religion, or prohibiting the free exercise thereof; or abridging the freedom of speech . . .” Before Sinclair could finish reciting the First Amendment, he and three others were arrested. The arresting officer was recorded to have said, “We’ll have none of that Constitution stuff.” Three days later, seventy-one alleged IWW members were arrested and jailed. So effective was police action against strike leaders that the Shipowners' Association declared the walkout over on May 18, when eighty-five vessels were loaded or unloaded by 2,800 longshoremen for the busiest day in port history. Fifty policemen were immediately returned to Los Angeles for regular duty, and 500 strikebreakers were given permanent employment.

Although the strike was losing ground, IWW leaders did not give up. Many of their members were in jail and others had left town to look for jobs elsewhere. The efficiency of longshore operations was improving each day. Strikers who were not proven Wobblies were returning to work through the open-shop Sea Service Bureau. But still the walkout continued. On May 21, 3,000 posters announcing a meeting at Liberty Hall in San Pedro on the evening of May 23 were distributed in the harbor area. The meeting was to be addressed by Upton Sinclair and a number of other speakers under the auspices of the American Civil Liberties Union. The meeting drew 5,000 people, but there were no fireworks, as police were present to ensure that it was peaceful. The next day a general meeting of 600 longshoremen, most of whom were not Wobblies, voted to "transfer" the dispute back to the job, and the walkout was officially ended.

== Aftermath ==
The 1923 San Pedro Maritime strike was the biggest challenge to the dominance of the open shop philosophy that controlled Los Angeles until the 1930s. It was defeated without too much of a struggle because of the strength the shop owners, use of the Los Angeles Police Department, KKK, and others as enforcers to try and break the strike. Another factor which helped defeat the strike was the high amount of strikebreakers who were brought into the city from all other parts of the state, which helped keep the docks open enough to allow commercial business to take place. The open shop would remain the ideology that ran Los Angeles for another 15 years.

- The Liberty Hill site was designated a California Historic Landmark (No. 1021) on March 3, 1997.

== See also ==
- Bibliography of Los Angeles
- Outline of the history of Los Angeles
- Bibliography of California history
