= Lawrence Lamont =

American film director

Lawrence Lamont (born 1989/1990) is an American filmmaker. He directed the feature film One of Them Days (2025) and has also directed music videos for Big Sean, one of which garnered him a nomination for the MTV Video Music Award for Best Hip-Hop Video. He also co-wrote the 2011 feature film CornerStore.

He was born in Detroit. He attended Southfield High School and as of 2025, he resides in Los Angeles.
