= Roger Guenveur Smith =

American actor (born 1955)

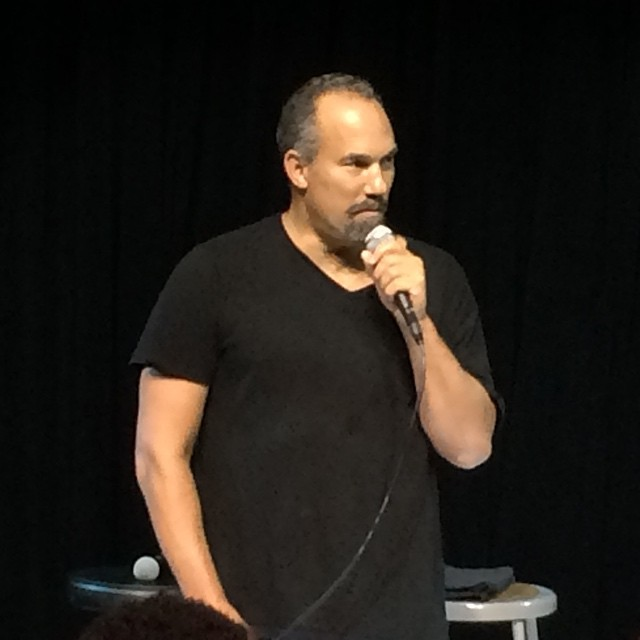
- Smith performing in 2014
- Born: July 27, 1955 (age 71); Berkeley, California, U.S.
- Education: Occidental College (BA); Yale University (MFA)
- Occupations: Actor, director, writer
- Years active: 1988–present
- Spouses: Carolina Smith (divorced); LeTania Kirkland
- Children: 4

Roger Guenveur Smith (/ˈɡɛnvɛər/; born July 27, 1955) is an American actor, director, and writer best known for his collaborations with Spike Lee.

== Early life ==
Roger Guenveur Smith was born on July 27, 1955, in Berkeley, California, the son of Helen Guenveur, a dentist, and Sherman Smith, a judge. He attended Loyola High School in Los Angeles, Beverly Hills High School in Beverly Hills, and graduated from Occidental College with a degree in American Studies. He then studied at Yale University in New Haven, Connecticut, where he successfully auditioned for the Drama School and switched his pursuit of a graduate degree in history. Additionally, Smith studied at the Keskidee Arts Centre in London.

== Career ==
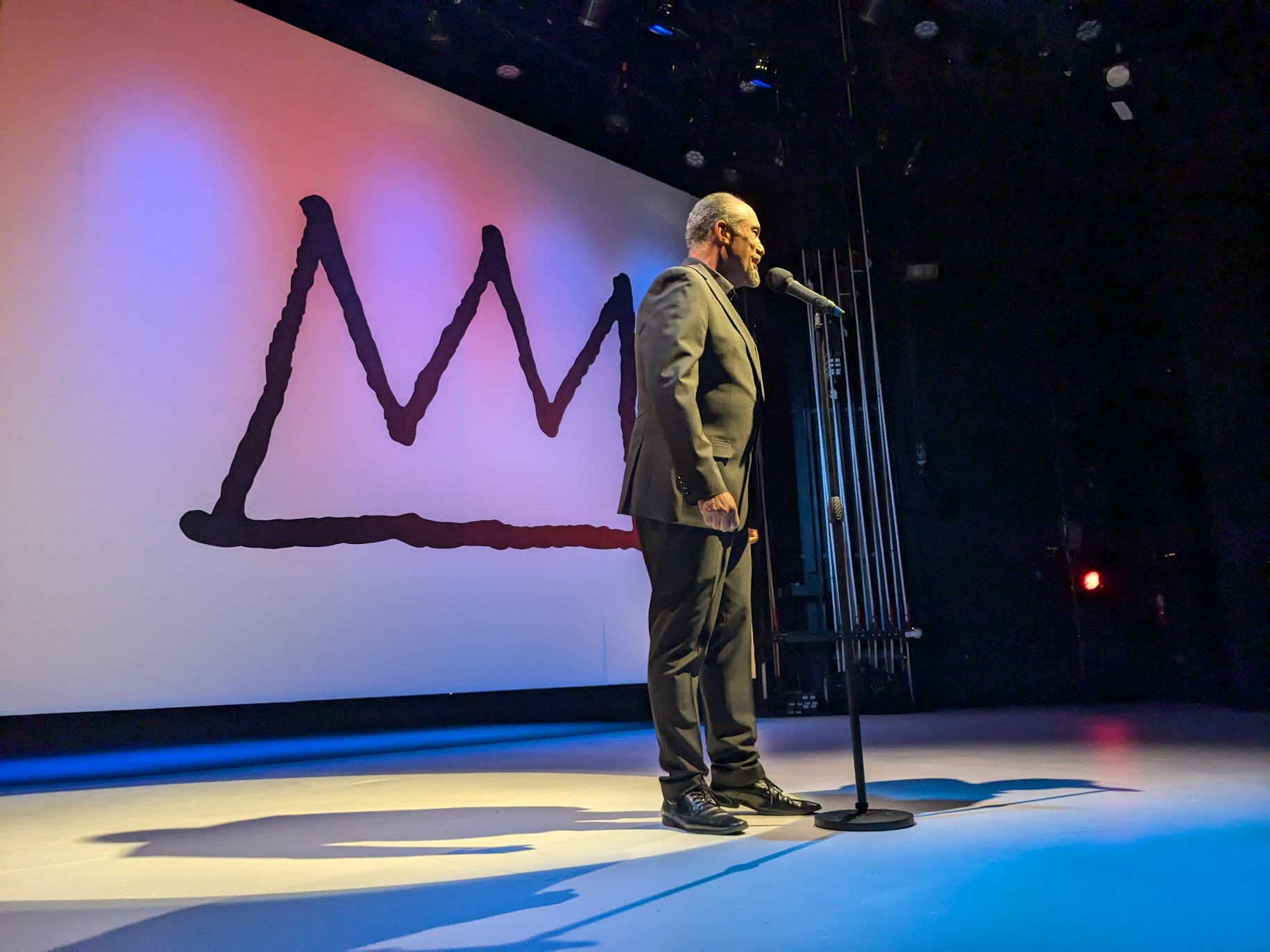
Smith after a 2024 performance of In Honor of Jean-Michel Basquiat.

Smith has appeared in films such as School Daze, Do the Right Thing, King of New York, Panther, Malcolm X, Poetic Justice, Get on the Bus, Eve's Bayou, He Got Game, and Summer of Sam. Several of these films were with director Spike Lee. During the 1990s, he had a recurring role on A Different World.

In 1996, Smith starred in the self-written and produced A Huey P. Newton Story, a one-man theatre performance based on the life of Black Panther Party founder Huey P. Newton. Smith received an Obie Award, and a performance was later filmed by Spike Lee and released in 2001.

In 1998, he starred with Linda Hamilton, Lynn Whitfield, and Bruce Greenwood as "perfectly cast" in the television film The Color of Courage, which Variety called "excellent".

In addition to his performances in major studio productions, Smith continues to work in and support independent film projects. In 2003, he had a starring role in the Steven Soderbergh/George Clooney TV series K-Street on HBO. Also in 2003, Smith read in the HBO documentary, Unchained Memories: Readings from the Slave Narratives; the film, based on interviews conducted by the WPA in the 1930s with formerly enslaved African Americans, is a compilation of slave narratives with actors emulating the original conversation with the interviewer.

Smith was also the voice of Bao-Dur in the video game Star Wars: Knights of the Old Republic II: The Sith Lords. He portrayed Craig Barnes, a corrupt detective in the martial arts/crime film Fist of the Warrior, alongside Ho-Sung Pak and Sherilyn Fenn. Smith starred with Laurence Fishburne and Jeff Goldblum in the 1992 cult crime film Deep Cover. He also played a villain in All About the Benjamins (2002) with Ice Cube.

In 2000, he portrayed Agent Schreck in the first installment of the Final Destination horror films. In 2006, he played the main villain in the straight-to-video actioner Mercenary for Justice, opposite Steven Seagal. Smith was in the 2007 film American Gangster with Denzel Washington and Russell Crowe, in which he played the role of Nate, Frank Lucas (Washington)'s army connection in Vietnam. He also played the role of Isaiah in the 2016 film The Birth of a Nation, a film about the life of Nat Turner. Smith also had a recurring role in the hit HBO series Oz.

Juan and John, written and performed by Smith, is based on baseball's most famous fight—San Francisco Giants pitcher Juan Marichal clubbing John Roseboro of the Los Angeles Dodgers with his bat during a 1965 battle for the pennant at Candlestick Park—which traumatized the playwright as a child. Smith portrayed American black leader Booker T. Washington in the 2020 Netflix miniseries Self Made, based on the life of Madame C. J. Walker (Octavia Spencer). Smith wrote, directed, and performed the solo show In Honor of Jean-Michel Basquiat, a tribute to Jean-Michel Basquiat, whom he was friends with.

== Personal life ==
Smith is divorced from Carolina Smith, the mother of his adult daughter. He and his wife, LeTania Kirkland Smith, have three children.

== Filmography ==
Year	Title	Role
1988	School Daze	Yoda
1989	Do the Right Thing	Smiley
1990	King of New York	Tanner
1992	Deep Cover	Eddie
1992	Malcolm X	Rudy
1993	Poetic Justice	Heywood
1995	Panther	Pruitt
1995	Tales from the Hood	Rhodie
1996	Get on the Bus	Gary
1997	Eve's Bayou	Lenny Mereaux
1998	He Got Game	Big Time Willie
1999	Summer of Sam	Detective Curt Atwater
1999	Facade	Henson
2000	Final Destination	Agent Schreck
2001	A Huey P. Newton Story	Huey P. Newton
2002	All About the Benjamins	Julian Ramose
2003	Shade	Marlo
2004	Justice	Carter
2004	Joy Road	Charles Blocker
2006	Fatwa	Samir Al-Faied
2006	Mercenary for Justice	Anthony Chapel
2006	Confessions	Father Jeffrey
2006	God's Waiting List	Solomon Corbin
2007	Fist of the Warrior	Det. Craig Barnes
2007	I Believe in America	Cesar
2007	The Take	Dr. Phineas
2007	American Gangster	Nate
2007	Cover	Kevin Wilson
2009	Fighting	Jack Dancing
2009	The Rothstein Diamond	Walter
2010	Caller ID	Blake
2010	Mooz-Lum	Hassan Mahdi
2010	Better Mus' Come	Prime Minister
2011	The Son of No One	Hanky
2011	CornerStore	Earl
2011	Abduction	Mr. Miles
2011	Lost Revolution	Cesar
2012	In the Hive	Paris
2013	Water & Power	Turnvill
2013	They Die by Dawn	Jourdon Anderson
2015	Dope	Austin Jacoby
2015	Dutch Book	Cornelius Parks
2015	But Not for Me	Raymond Little
2015	Supermodel	Max
2015	Chi-Raq	Red, White, and Blue Insurance Salesman
2016	The Birth of a Nation	Isaiah
2016	Dirty	Detective Berg
2016	Why Lie? Beer, Woman, Chicken Wings	Dubs Miguel
2017	Bitch	Steven Sheriff
2017	The Queen of Hollywood Blvd.	Duke
2017	The Clapper	Dr. Rogers B. Hay
2017	Rodney King	Rodney King
2017	Dr. Brinks & Dr. Brinks	Paul Sydney
2017	Marshall	Walter White
2018	The Choir Director	Trustee Jonathan Smith
2018	No More Mr Nice Guy	El Gato
2018	The Other Side	Martin
2018	Burning Shadow	Mr. Jones
2018	I'll See You Around	Michael Gomez
2018	Behind the Movement	Rosa Parks husband
2020	Carl Weber's Influence	Bradley Hudson
2022	Till	Dr. T.R.M. Howard
In production	Remote	

== Television ==
Year	Title	Role	Notes
1990	A Different World	Professor Howard Randolph	5 episodes
1991	Murphy Brown	Man in Gallery	Episode: "Eldin Imitates Life"
1995	Fallen Angels	Johnny Truelove	Episode: "Fearless"
1997	New York Undercover	Forbes	Episode: "The Last Hurrah"
1997	Oz	Huseni Mershah	2 episodes
1997-1998	All My Children	Miles Christopher	6 episodes
2000	City Of Angels	Terry Pennington	Episode: "A Farewell to Arm"
2002	The Guardian	Reginald Harris	Episode: "The Next Life"
2003	K Street	Francisco Dupre	10 episodes
2005	Third Watch	Officer Ty Davies Sr.	Episode: "Forever Blue"
2008	Terminator: The Sarah Connor Chronicles	Sac Federici	Episode: "Samson & Delilah"
2009	Kings	Belial	Episode: "Brotherhood"
2011	Eagleheart	Vargas	Episode: "Get Worse Soon"
2011	The Whole Truth		Episode: "Lost in Translation"
2017	Queen Sugar	Quincy	Episode: "Heritage"
2019	Black Jesus	Cardinal	Episode: "Vatican Guys"
2020	Self Made	Booker T. Washington	Episode: "Bootstraps"
2022–2023	All Rise	Judge Marshall Thomas	8 episodes

== Video games ==
Year	Title	Role
2004	Star Wars Knights of the Old Republic II: The Sith Lords	Bao-Dur
