= CornerStore =

- Directed by: Joseph Doughrity
- Written by: Joseph Doughrity
- Produced by: Autumn Bailey; Brandon Crockett; Joseph Doughrity; Robert Evangelista; Len Gibson; Lawrence Lamont; Bill H. McKinney III; Dwight Patillo; Dwight E. Patillo; Daniel Sefa; Twan Williams
- Release date: 2011

CornerStore is a Detroit made film directed by Joe Doughrity. It is about a young man working at his father's corner store. This comedy basically depicts a "day in the life" of an inner city liquor store. The film's tagline states: A LOT can happen on the corner.

== Plot ==
Gerard Jenkins (Lawrence Lamont) wakes up after dreaming himself a famous chef. His older sister calls in saying she is on her way to Cedar Point and so he has to look after their father's (Roger Guenveur Smith) shop. To Gerard's dismay he has to run his father's shop for the day. Over the course of the day a lot of things happen. One of the major events that happen throughout the day is when a local gangster, Nazario (Ari Rufino), comes into the shop and tells Gerard to hold $5,000 for him. Gerard is reluctant but gives in eventually. Later a kid named Mykell (Trevione Williams) walks in to sell Gerard stolen electronics but Gerard doesn't buy any. Gerard gets distracted and Mykell sneaks behind the cashier counter and finds the $5,000 and steals it. Later Nazario comes to Gerard asking for the money. Gerard can't locate it and so is threatened by Nazario at gun point. Mykell admits he stole the money and spent it on himself and so his mom, Keisha (Kia Jelks), could get her car repaired. Nazario is out numbered and leaves. Later one of Gerard's associates tell Gerard that his girlfriends car is getting broken into. Gerard walks out infuriated only to find his family and nearly everyone who frequents the store outside screaming " Happy Birthday"!

== Cast ==
- Lawrence Lamont as Gerard, the store owners son.
- Roger Guenveur Smith as Earl, the store owner.
- Judge Greg Mathis as himself.
- Ari Rufino as Nazario. Formerly billed as Sherzad Sinjari.
- Trick Trick as himself.
- Mike Bonner as Kato.
- David Ffroot Wells as Derrick.
- Martini Harris as Eddie.
- Bill Hill as Big Jim.
- Schuyler Maximillian Lee as K.J.
- Trevione Williams as Mykell.
- Cameron Jones as Corey.
- Kia Jelks as Keisha
- Mercy Mitchell as Fantasia.

== Awards ==
- Best Comedy from Windsor Film Festival.
- Awards from Pan African Film Festival in Los Angeles, California.
- Awards from Langston Hughes Film Festival in Seattle, Washington.

Released theatrically via AMC Independent / AMC Theatres.
