= Supermodel (film) =

2015 film by Shawn Baker

- Film poster
- Directed by: Shawn Baker
- Produced by: Datari Turner
- Starring: Tyson Beckford; Sessilee Lopez; Tatyana Ali; Fat Joe; Roger Guenveur Smith
- Release date: June 14, 2015
- Running time: 98 minutes
- Country: United States
- Language: English

Supermodel is a 2015 film directed by Shawn Baker and Datari Turner and starring Tyson Beckford, Sessilee Lopez, Tatyana Ali, Fat Joe and Roger Guenveur Smith. It was produced by Datari Turner.

== Plot ==
Supermodel tells the story of a young woman from Brooklyn who rises from humble beginnings to become a top fashion model. As she enters the glamorous world of modeling, she faces the pressures and challenges that come with fame, beauty standards, and personal identity. The film explores how success in the fashion industry can come at a cost, revealing the emotional and psychological struggles behind the scenes.
