= Israeli Americans =

Community of Americans of Israeli descent or with Israeli citizenship

אמריקאים ישראלים (Hebrew)

Total population
- 200,000 to 500,000 (2020 United States census)

Regions with significant populations
- New York metropolitan area, Los Angeles metropolitan area, Miami metropolitan area, and other large metropolitan areas

Languages
- English, Hebrew, Yiddish, French, Russian, Arabic, German

Religion
- Majority: Judaism; Minority: Christianity, Druze faith, Islam, other religions, and irreligion

Related ethnic groups
- Jewish Americans, Arab Americans

Israeli Americans (Hebrew: אָמֶרִיקָאִים יִשׂרָאֵליִם, romanized: Ameriqaim Yiśraʾelim) are Americans who are of full or partial Israeli descent.

The Israeli-American community, while predominantly Jewish, also includes various ethnic and religious minorities reflective of Israel's diverse demographics. This community also comprises ethnic Arab minorities, including Muslims, Christians and Druze as well as smaller, non-Arab minority groups.

== History ==
The number of Israeli Americans in the United States is estimated to be 191,000 according the 2020 US census. Israelis began migrating to the United States shortly after the establishment of the State of Israel in May 1948. Thus, during the 1950s, 21,376 Israeli immigrants moved to the US and the 1960s saw 30,911 Israeli immigrants, often seen as the first wave of Israeli immigration to the US when 52,278 Israelis emigrated to the US according to US Immigration data. A second wave of modest immigration continued with a total of 36,306 Israelis during 1970 to 1979, 43,669 in 1980 to 1989, 41,340 in 1990 to 1999, and 54,801 in 2000 to 2009. Since 2010, Israeli migration to the US has continued at around four thousand per year.

== Demographics ==
Since the establishment of the State of Israel in May 1948, and until today, many Israelis emigrated to the US. The 2000 US census estimated that nearly 110,000 Israelis lived in the US back then, while other unsourced estimates say the number is much higher, around 500,000. A considerable numbers of Israelis, estimated broadly from 200,000 to three times that figure, have moved abroad in the recent decades (Yerida).

According to statistics from the US Department of Homeland Security, between 1949 and 2015, about 250,000 Israelis acquired permanent residency in the US. The statistics did not track those who eventually moved back to Israel. In 2012, a Global Religion and Migration Database constructed by the Pew Research Center showed that there were a total of 330,000 native-born Israelis, including 230,000 Jews, living outside of Israel, in the United States and elsewhere around the world, approximately 4% of Israel's native-born Jewish population. Based on current estimates of Israel-born Jewish migrants to the US of 140,000, two thirds of Jewish Israeli native emigrants have settled in the US and the remaining third in Canada, Europe, South America, South Africa, and the remainder of the world.

In addition to native-born Israelis and Israelis who originally immigrated to Israel from other countries and then moved on to the United States, there have been American Jews who immigrated to Israel and became Israeli citizens, lived there for a certain period of time, and later returned to the US. Israeli demographer Yinon Cohen estimated the number of American-born Israelis who had returned to the United States to be between 30,000 and 60,000 by 1990, and between 53,000 and 75,000 in 2000.

The Organisation for Economic Co-operation and Development calculated an 'expatriate rate' of 2.9 persons per thousand, putting Israel in the mid-range of expatriate rates among the 175 countries examined in an OECD report from 2005.

The New York City metropolitan area has now become by far the leading metropolitan gateway for Israeli immigrants legally admitted into the US, with the Los Angeles metropolitan area now in a distant second place. Within the US, as of April 2013, Israeli airline El Al operated from John F. Kennedy International Airport and Newark Liberty International Airport, both in the New York City metropolitan area, as well as from Los Angeles International Airport. The New York City metropolitan area is home to the largest Jewish community outside Israel, and the city proper contains the largest Jewish community in the world.

In 1982, Pini Herman and David LaFontaine, in a study of Israeli emigrants in Los Angeles, found high levels of Jewish affiliation, Jewish organizational participation and concentration in Jewish neighborhoods by Israeli emigrants. Israeli emigrants who behaved in a comparatively secular manner in Israel tended to behave in a more devoutly Jewish manner in Los Angeles and Israeli emigrants who reported greater Jewish behaviors in Israel tended to engage in Jewish behaviors to a lesser degree in Los Angeles, thus both becoming more 'Americanized' in their Jewish behaviors.

In 2009, Steven M. Cohen and Judith Veinstein found that in New York, Jewish Israeli emigrants are highly affiliated with the Jewish community even though community affiliation is low in Israel. Israelis were found to be more connected to Judaism than their American counterparts in terms of synagogue membership and attendance, kashrut observance, participation in Jewish charity events and membership in Jewish community centers, among other indicators used by the study.

Israelis tend to be disproportionately Jewishly active in their diaspora communities, creating and participating formal and informal organizations, participating in diaspora Jewish religious institutions and sending their children to Jewish education providers at a greater rate than local diaspora Jews.

=== By generations ===
Based on the 2013 Pew American Jewry Survey estimate base on Jews by religion/no religion/Jewish background who were born in Israel is 140,000 nationally. American Jews born in Israel had 40 thousand children under age 18 in their US households. Another estimated 170 thousand Jewish adults not born in Israel have at least one parent born in Israel, and these adults have an estimated 200 thousand children under the age of 18 who have at least one Israel-born grandparent. An additional 60 thousand American Jews reported that they had once "lived in Israel."

=== By state ===
The US states by Israeli Americans as per the 2000 census:

State	Population rank	Israeli American (2000)	Percent Israeli American (2000)
New York	1	30,164	0.2%
California	2	24,956	0.1%
Florida	3	9,511	0.1%
New Jersey	4	7,939	0.1%
Massachusetts	5	3,713	0.1%
Illinois	6	3,557	0.0%
Pennsylvania	7	3,051	0.0%
Maryland	8	3,044	0.1%
Texas	9	2,974	0.0%
Michigan	10	1,737	0.0%
Ohio	11	1,640	0.0%
Connecticut	12	1,387	0.0%
Georgia (U.S. state)	13	1,149	0.0%
Washington	14	1,021	0.0%
Arizona	15	984	0.0%
Nevada	16	930	0.0%
Virginia	17	898	0.0%
Colorado	18	873	0.0%
North Carolina	19	745	0.0%
Missouri	20	612	0.0%
Wisconsin	21	540	0.0%
Oregon	22	454	0.0%
South Carolina	23	454	0.0%
Minnesota	24	432	0.0%
Indiana	25	363	0.0%
Tennessee	26	324	0.0%
New Mexico	27	309	0.0%
Oklahoma	28	240	0.0%
Louisiana	29	230	0.0%
District of Columbia	-	229	0.0%
Utah	30	226	0.0%
Rhode Island	31	214	0.0%
Hawaii	32	208	0.0%
Kansas	33	197	0.0%
Iowa	34	187	0.0%
Alabama	35	181	0.0%
New Hampshire	36	142	0.0%
Kentucky	37	139	0.0%
Delaware	38	138	0.0%
Vermont	39	131	0.0%
Arkansas	40	103	0.0%
Mississippi	41	100	0.0%
Idaho	42	87	0.0%
Nebraska	43	85	0.0%
Alaska	44	62	0.0%
Puerto Rico	-	55	0.0%
Maine	45	45	0.0%
North Dakota	46	36	0.0%
West Virginia	47	36	0.0%
Montana	48	33	0.0%
South Dakota	49	22	0.0%
Wyoming	50	7	0.0%

== Culture and organizations ==
Various Israeli American communities have their own newspapers which are printed in Hebrew. Communities arrange cultural, entertainment and art events (including celebrations of the Israeli independence day which usually takes place in Israeli American demographic centers), and some have the Israeli Network channel, which consists of a selection of live broadcasts as well as reruns of Israeli television news broadcasts, entertainment programs and Israeli sport events. Hundreds of thousands of spectators view the annual Celebrate Israel Parade on Fifth Avenue in Manhattan, which touts itself as the world's largest celebration of Israel. At the 2017 Celebrate Israel parade in Manhattan, New York Governor Andrew Cuomo declared the Sunday Shimon Peres Day in New York and announced a new venture to promote cultural heritage tourism between Israel and New York, as Cuomo marched alongside the son of the late Israeli leader.

A variety of Hebrew language websites, newspapers and magazines are published in New York, Los Angeles, South Florida, and other US regions. The Israeli Channel along with two other Hebrew-language channels are available via satellite broadcast nationally in the US. Hebrew language Israeli programming on local television was broadcast in New York and Los Angeles during the 1990s, prior to Hebrew language satellite broadcast. Live performances by Israeli artists are a regular occurrence in centers of Israeli emigrants in the US and Canada with audience attendance often in the hundreds. An Israeli Independence Day Festival has taken place yearly in Los Angeles since 1990 with thousands of Israeli emigrants and American Jews.

In Los Angeles, a Council of Israeli Community was founded in 2001. In 2007, an Israel Leadership Council (ILC) was also organized in Los Angeles, later it was renamed Israeli-American Council, and it has been active in supporting activities for Israel, most recently in 2008, it sponsored with the local Jewish Federation and Israeli consulate a concert in support for the embattled population suffering rocket attacks of Sderot, Israel where the three frontrunners for the US presidency, Hillary Clinton, Barack Obama, and John McCain, greeted the attendees by video and expressed their support for the residents of Sderot. An Israeli Business Network of Beverly Hills has existed since 1996. The Israeli-American Study Initiative (IASI), a start-up project based at the UCLA International Institute, is set out to document the lives and times of Israeli Americans—initially focusing on those in Los Angeles and eventually throughout the US.

== Economic contributions ==
According to CNN, Israeli companies are establishing entrepreneurial ventures in New York City at the rate of ten new startups per month. In 2022, there were 293 Israeli startups in the New York area, the most of any metropolitan area outside Tel Aviv and Jerusalem.

== Relationship with American Jews ==
Israeli Americans are generally seen as having less interaction with the non-Israeli Jewish American community and its institutions, often preferring to maintain ties of association with other Israeli Americans. Jewish Americans, especially religious Jewish Americans, tend to maintain correspondingly sparse contact with the Israeli American community besides participation in religious ceremonies. An estimated 75% of Israeli Americans marry within the Jewish community, as opposed to about 50% of non-Israeli Jewish Americans. At the same time, younger Israelis in the US are assimilating in increasing numbers.

== In popular culture ==
• Comedian-writer Robert Smigel came up with a Saturday Night Live sketch in 1990 called the "Sabra Shopping Network". Two years later, Smigel followed it up with "Sabra Price Is Right", starring Tom Hanks as a pushy Israeli game show host, Sandler and Rob Schneider as its presenters and Smigel as a cigarette-smoking announcer, all pushing shoddy electronics on hapless clientele.

• The concept for the 2008 You Don't Mess with the Zohan movie, which was based on the skits "Sabra Shopping Network" and "Sabra Price Is Right", focused on Zohan Dvir, an IDF commando soldier, who stages his own death to fulfill his deepest dream—moving to New York to become a hairdresser.

• At the end of the 2005 film Munich, the main character Avner (played by Eric Bana), who is an Israeli Mossad agent, decides to move from Israel to Brooklyn to reunite with his wife and their child.

• In Tom Clancy's Rainbow Six Siege one of the operators the player can play as is Eliza "Ash" Cohen, An Israeli of mixed Jewish and Arab descent, who was born in Israel, served in the IDF, and later immigrated into America after which she joined Team Rainbow, an elite international anti-terrorism task force.

== See also ==
- Yerida
- Israeli Canadians
- History of Israelis in Los Angeles
- Middle Eastern Americans
- Israel–United States relations
- History of Jews in Latin America and the Caribbean
