= Fist of the Warrior =

- DVD cover
- Directed by: Wayne A. Kennedy
- Screenplay by: Wayne A. Kennedy
- Story by: Ho-Sung Pak
- Produced by: Jeanette Brill; Ho-Sung Pak; Wayne A. Kennedy; Matthew Chausse; Arnon Manor
- Starring: Ho-Sung Pak; Peter Greene; Roger Guenveur Smith; Robin Paul; Sherilyn Fenn
- Cinematography: Max Da-Yung Wang
- Edited by: Karl T. Hirsch; Wayne A. Kennedy
- Music by: Nathan Lanier
- Production company: Catchlight Films
- Distributed by: Lionsgate
- Release date: June 4, 2009
- Running time: 88 minutes
- Country: United States
- Language: English

Fist of the Warrior, formerly known as Lesser of Three Evils, is a martial arts/crime film directed by Wayne A. Kennedy in his feature film directorial debut. It stars Ho-Sung Pak, Peter Greene, Roger Guenveur Smith and Sherilyn Fenn, and features fight choreography by Ho-Sung Pak and Wayne A. Kennedy. The film was shot in 2004 in Los Angeles, California, USA, and was released by Lionsgate Home Entertainment on February 10, 2009.

== Plot ==
The film follows three characters, a hit-man, a mobster and a corrupt detective who confront each other when events come to a head for them. Hit-man Lee Choe decides to retire to live a normal life. After refusing an order from mobster John Lowe, Lowe has Lee's girlfriend killed. In order to seek vengeance, Lee goes on a mission to kill Lowe, who turns to corrupt detective Craig Barnes to frame him. At the same time, Barnes, who's being investigated by internal affairs, has to deal with his unhappy, alcoholic wife Katie.

== Cast ==
- Ho-Sung Pak as Lee Choe
- Peter Greene as John Lowe
- Roger Guenveur Smith as Detective Craig Barnes
- Robin Paul as Sarah Reeves
- Sherilyn Fenn as Katie Barnes
- Rosa Blasi as Woman In Black
- Antonio Fargas as Father Riley
- Ed Marinaro as Raymond Miles
- Michael Dorn as Arnold Denton
- John Dye as Internal Affairs Officer
- A Martinez as Anthony Black
- Brian Thompson as Max
- Isaac C. Singleton Jr. as Frank
- Richard Gant as Chief Matthews
- Lara Phillips as Jenny Reeves
- Marina Sirtis as Mary
- Gina St. John as Detective Georgette Wilson

== Production ==
Principal photography took place in August 2004. Fist of the Warrior was produced by Ho-Sung Pak, Wayne A. Kennedy and Matthew Chausse who created together the film company GenOne. It was initially produced by CatchLight Films under the title Lesser of Three Evils and was originally to be distributed by Fabrication Films. The film was featured at the 2005 Cannes Film Market However it was not released and was the subject of a legal dispute that ended in January 2008. In 2008 the film was renamed as Blood Money with Boll World Sales owning the international distribution rights. After being re-edited by Aglet Post, the film was ultimately released in the US by Lionsgate on DVD in 2009 under the title Fist of the Warrior.
