= Los Angeles in the 1920s =

The 1920s were prosperous years for Los Angeles, California, United States, when the name "Hollywood" became synonymous with the U.S. film industry and the visual setting of Los Angeles became famous worldwide. Plentiful job openings attracted heavy immigration, especially from the rural Midwest and Mexico. The city's population more than doubled in size from 577,000 to over 1.2 million between 1920 and 1929. An influx of families immigrating from Mexico tripled the city's Mexican population, which reached 97,000 by 1930, and the city became known as the "Mexican capital of the United States".

Extensive modernization took place in the 1920s, characterized by a dramatic increase in automobile usage, vast suburban sprawl, and the formation of western business and financial centers.

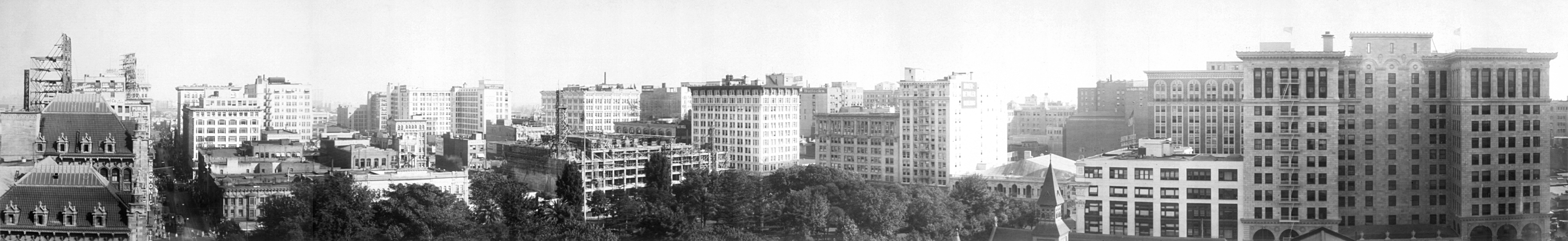
Panoramic view of Los Angeles in 1921

== Overview ==
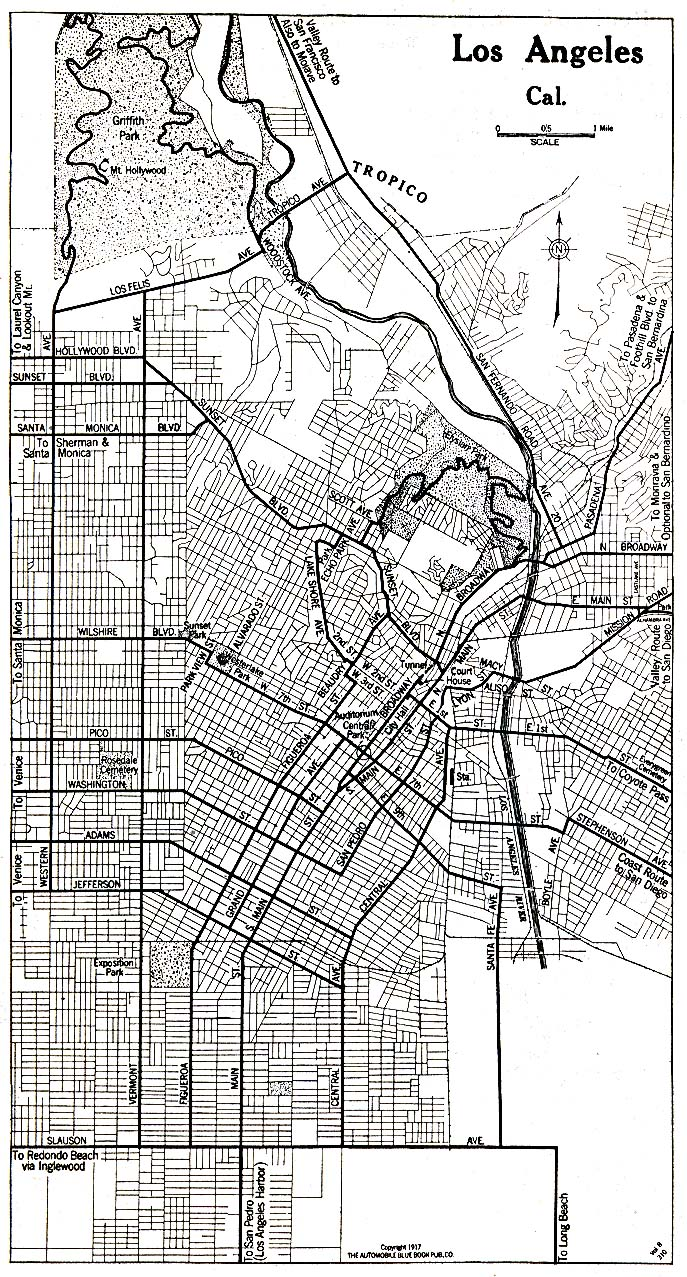
Map of Los Angeles in 1917

In 1919, the community living in the downtown area formed 50% of the population of Los Angeles, and mostly Anglo-Saxon Protestants from the Midwest. Very few people lived in the hills and the suburbs were sparsely populated. As a city, it was ranked 17th in the list of cities in the US with hardly any industrial development, with the petroleum industry in its infancy. However, the only redeeming feature was the Hollywood film industry which dominated the world with its silent movie productions.

A dramatic change took place over the decade, and in 1929, with the Great Depression, the city became a hub of Mexican immigrants and Blacks, resulting in some 85 square miles (220 km^{2}) of expansion and encroachment of the San Fernando Valley to its north and San Pedro Harbor in the south. The population was a cosmopolitan mixture of Caucasians, Protestants, Blacks (then the second largest group community after Baltimore), Jews (often emigrants from crowded New York), Armenians, Italians, and Russians, and small numbers of Chinese and Japanese. Internal mass migration also took place when 2 million Americans migrated to California, of which 1.2 million settled in Los Angeles. There were no slums in spite of influx of a large migrant population. The city's population skyrocketed from 102,000 at the turn of the century, to 577,000 in 1920, and over 1.2 million in 1929.

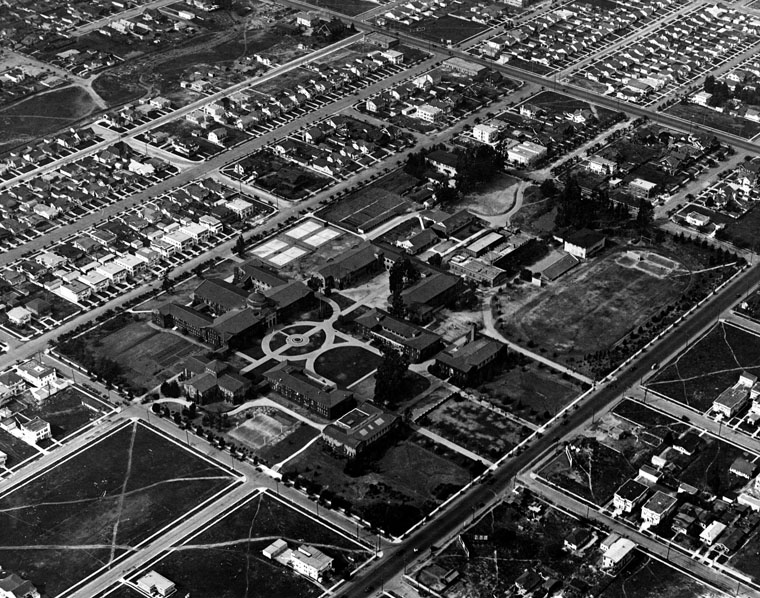
Aerial view of UCLA (formerly the University of California, Southern Branch) taken in 1922

Propelled by the boom in 1920s, it became the fifth largest city in the US. Petroleum became a major industry with extractions planned from the large reserves of Huntington Beach, Long Beach and Santa Fe Springs. Manufacturing industries boomed and it became the aviation capital of the US and occupied the ninth position among the industrial cities of the country. Eight major Hollywood studios produced 90% of all major movies, controlled all movie halls and held full film distribution rights. The city also got the nickname of "Emerald City of Los Angeles". Los Angeles Port became the second busiest deep water port and the banking sector became very large. As the emergent economy, fueled by oil and Hollywood real estate boomed, though with a growth fluctuation during 1924–25, one third of the homes in Los Angeles were privately owned by home owners, unlike other major cities in the US where the housing was largely rented.

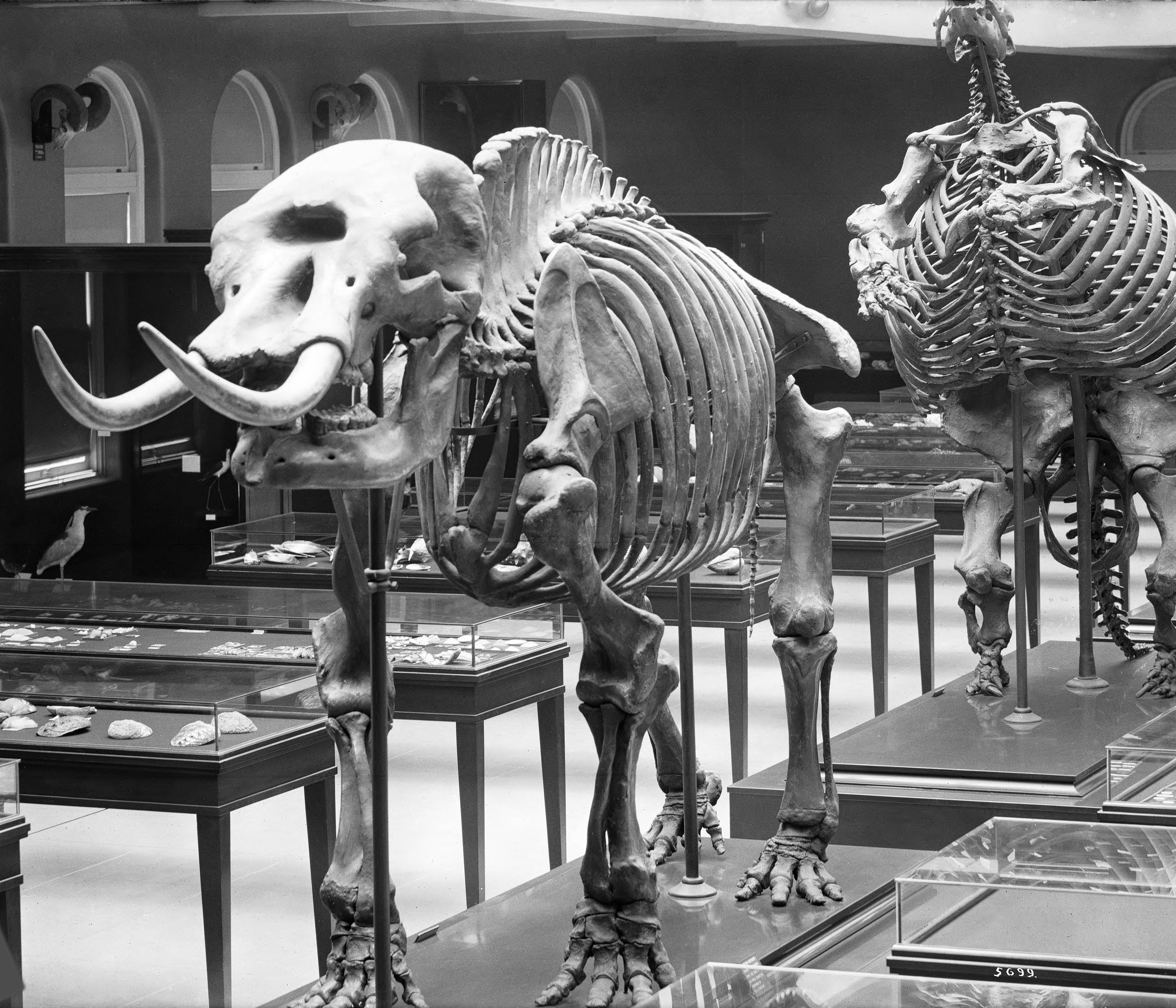
Los Angeles Museum of Natural History showing displays of prehistoric skeletons, ca.1920

During the process of development of the city, the largest fossil area was found in North America, with prehistoric animals skeletons buried in tar pits (brea in Spanish) (an area with leakage of tar and methane from the ground), was found during the expansion phase of the city in 1920. This area located on the Rancho La Brea, which was in the process of development was cordoned off and twelve city block were converted into the La Brea Tar Pits and designated as a county animal fossil area. Over the years, more archeological finds were discovered by the Los Angeles County Museum of Natural History. These are prominent exhibits in the museum. The finds on display include saber-toothed cats, the giant ground sloth, California lion, golden eagles, and more species from the Pleistocene age. The skeleton of only one human (that of a woman) was found and is on display in the museum under the title La Brea Woman.

Jewish people prospered in Los Angeles. Emigrants from the New York theatre world came to dominate the film industry.

Chinatown declined in population but remained a gambling den and a red-light area. In contrast, the Japanese presence increased, with a recorded population of 35,000 Japanese in Los Angeles County by 1930. The Mexican-American population also tripled in the period 1920-–30, from 33,644 to 97,116. The rise of the black population during this period was moderate and went up from 15,579 to 38,894.

Hollywood Boulevard was the main road of the Hollywood district of Los Angeles. Sunset Boulevard added to the glamorous age of Hollywood from the 1920s, and the Hollywood Hills became the residential complex of the rich and famous of the Hollywood film industry.

== 1920–1923 ==
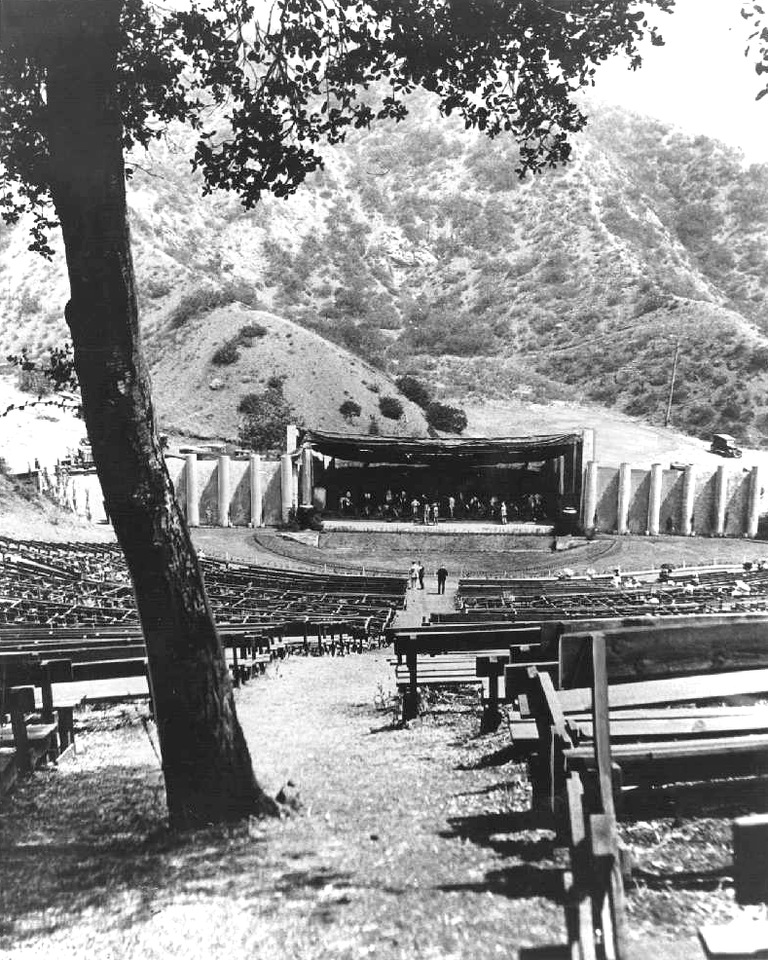
Hollywood Bowl (1922)

In 1920, the Architectural Digest started its publications which published pictures of the picturesque gardens that were developed by wealthy settlers. It was also the period when women of Los Angeles took up the study and practice of landscape architecture.

The iconic amphitheater, the Hollywood Bowl was formally opened in 1921 next to the location of the future Hollywood Freeway. It was the venue of music concerts, university graduation ceremonies, and other events of the community. It came to be formally known as the Bowl after 27 March 1921 when its first formal event was the Los Angeles Philharmonic performance, an Easter sunrise service attended by some 800. The first official summer season of the Philharmonic was held here in 1922. In May 1921, the Southern California Methodist Conference bought 1,100 acres of land north of Santa Monica, where they began holding camp meetings in Temescal Canyon and later subdivided the land into a new development called Pacific Palisades.

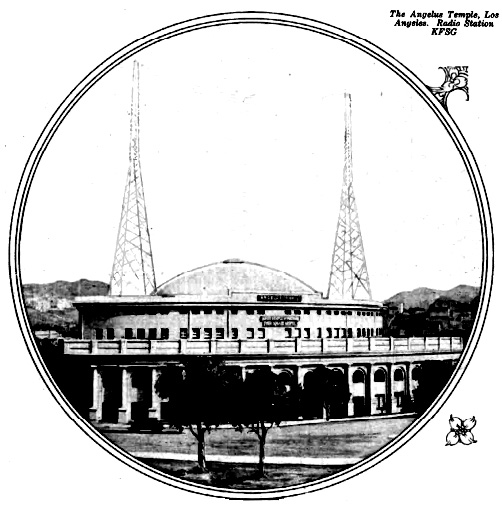
Angelus Temple (1925), with radio station KFSG's towers atop the temple

In 1922, as per a referendum, a site was identified for locating the Civic Center in the precincts of an area surrounded by the streets of the Main, Broadway, First and Temple in Downtown Los Angeles and for building the Civic Hall, bonds worth $7.5 million were also approved to be issued.

In the 1920s, the Hollywood residential complex, which has the iconic big sign “Hollywood”, was created by Harry Chandler, the news baron of the Los Angeles Times. The sign was erected in 1923, originally with the name as a billboard of "Hollywood Land Development". In a storm in 1943 most of the board was knocked out and subsequently only the word "Hollywood" was restored.

On January 1, 1923, widely popular evangelist Aimee Semple McPherson, founder of the International Church of the Foursquare Gospel, opened Angelus Temple in the Echo Park neighborhood of Los Angeles. Still in use, the temple was declared a National Historic Landmark 70 years later.

== 1924–1927 ==
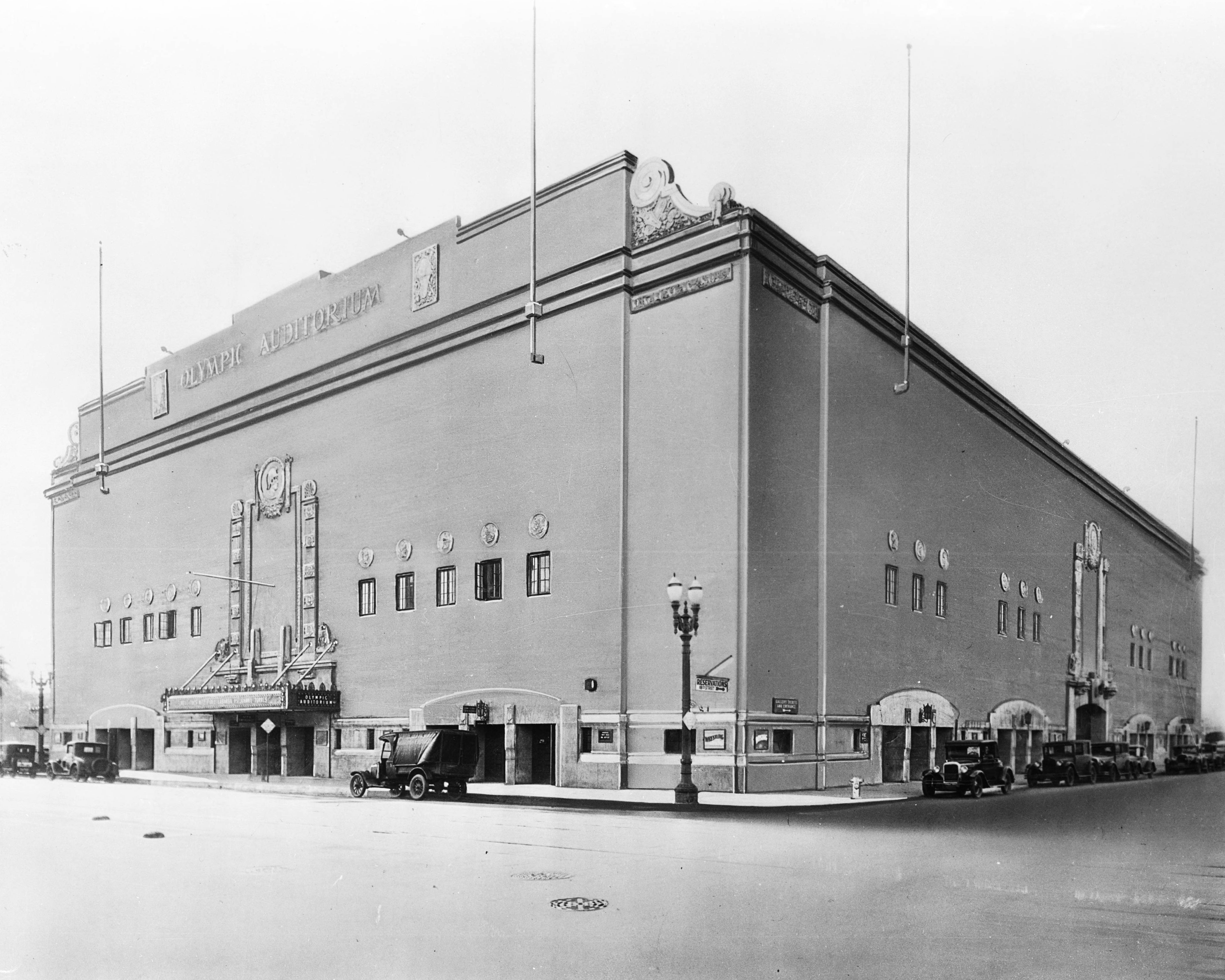
Exterior view of the Olympic Auditorium

1924-25 witnessed the beautification of street lights with ornamental lights, funds for which were approved by the municipal Art Commission and later further approved in 1927–1928. Torrance, considered a model "industrial suburb", was incorporated into Los Angeles.

In 1924 Jack Doyle was instrumental in building the Olympic Auditorium. He had full support of the Olympic committee for the 1932 Summer Olympic Games taking place in Los Angeles. The Auditorium was inaugurated on 13 January 1925. Jack Dempsey, World Heavy Weight Champion, and Estelle Taylor, film actress, were present. The stadium was built with a capacity for 10,400 spectators and was very well equipped.

At the time professional boxing was very popular with events held every day except Sundays. From the beginning of 1925, boxing events were held every alternate week at this venue. The first heavyweight card was held on 13 January 1925, the 10 round was between Jimmy McLarnin and Fidel LaBarba.

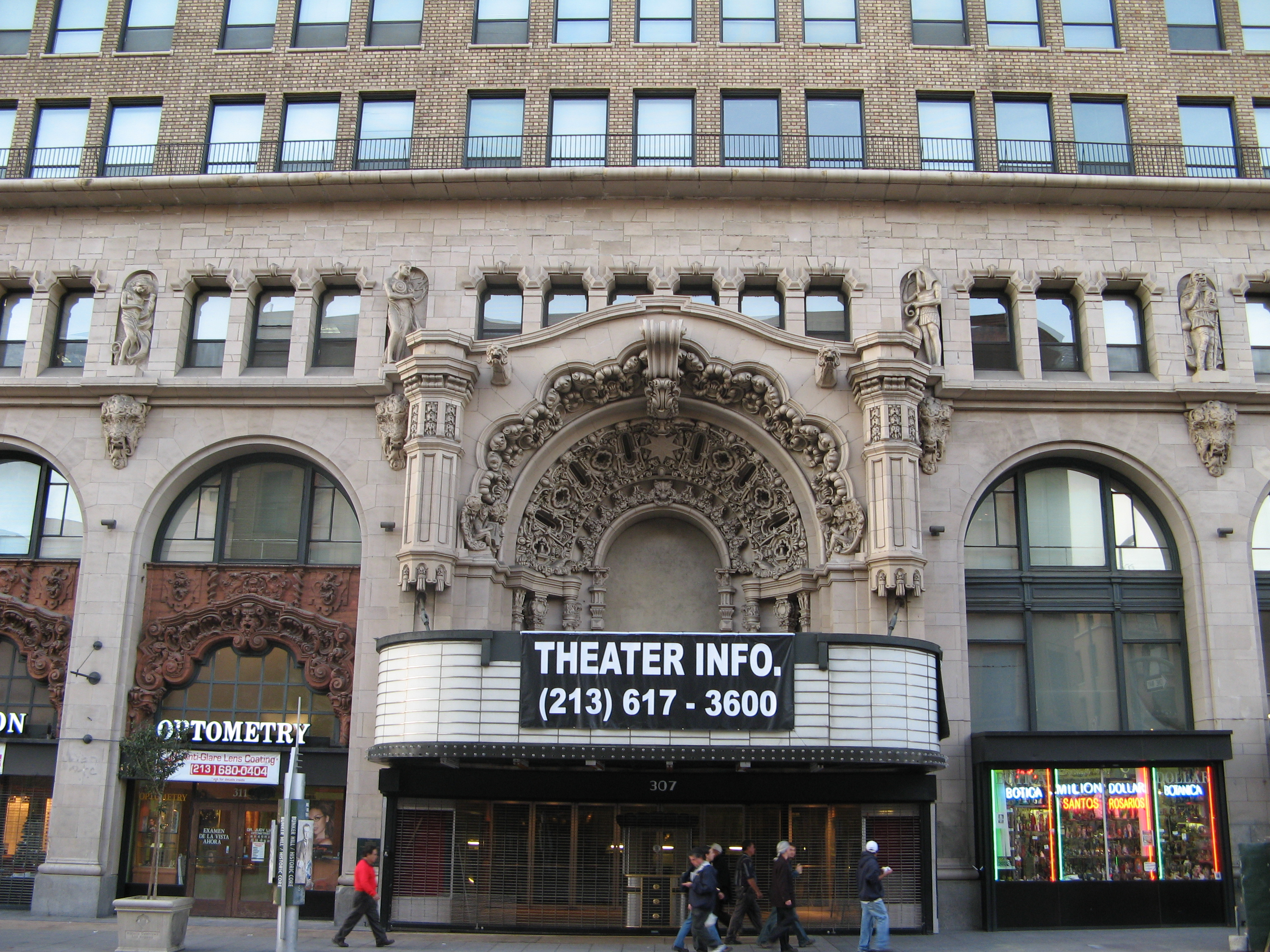
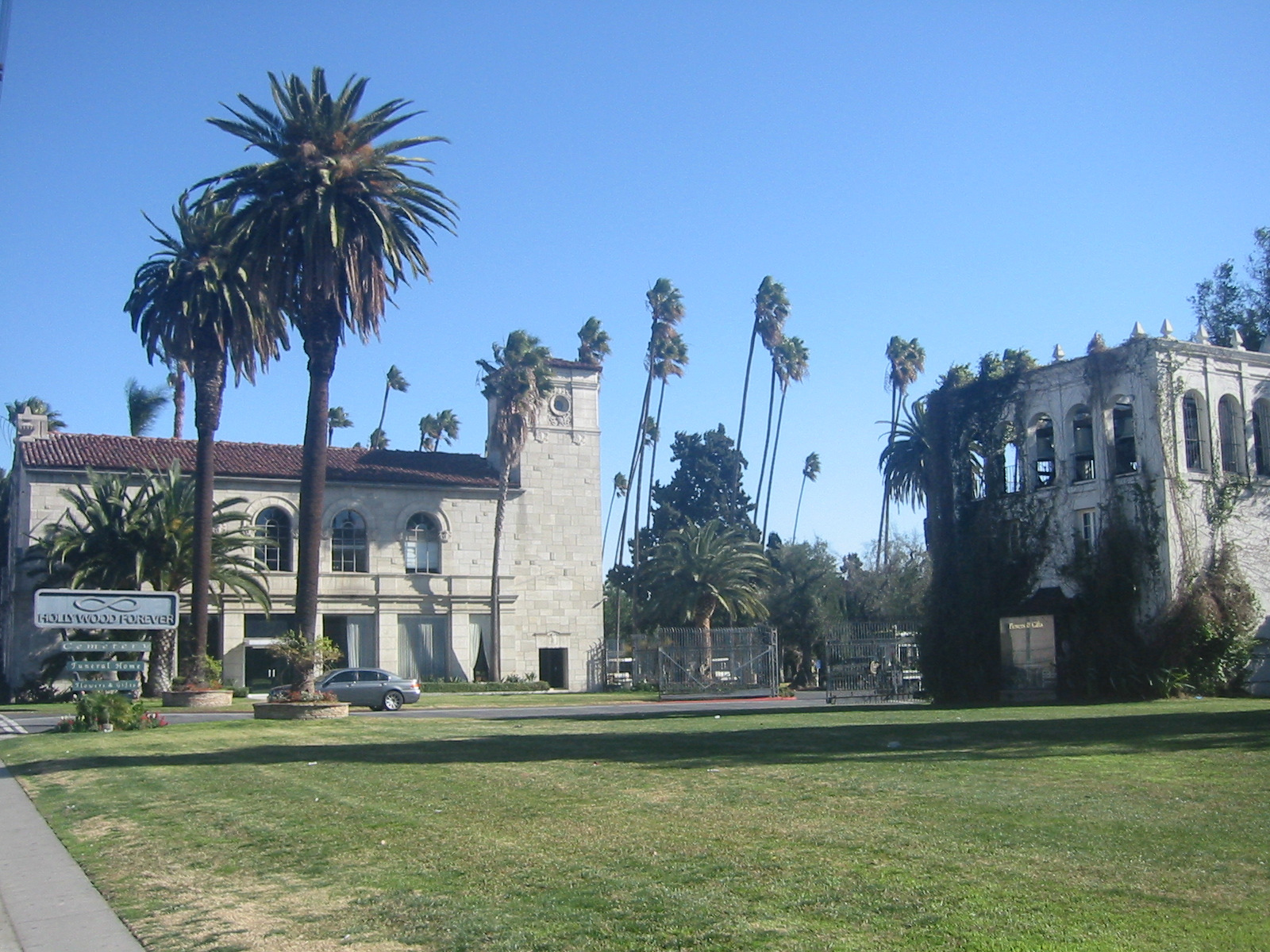
Left: Million Dollar Theater where many film premiers were held
Right: Hollywood Forever Cemetery

The Hollywood film Ben Hur premiered in December 1925 at the Million Dollar Theater and it ran for six months. The premiere was attended by actors Ramon Navarro, Francis X Bushman, Douglas Fairbanks, Mary Pickford and the director of the film, Fred Niblo. The occasion was a grand affair with a grand orchestra and stage show.

In 1926, famous exotic lover and silent film star Rudolph Valentino died at the age of 31. He is buried in the Hollywood Forever Cemetery, previously called Hollywood Memorial Park. Since then, on the anniversary of his death, a mysterious "Lady in Black" comes to mourn at his grave.

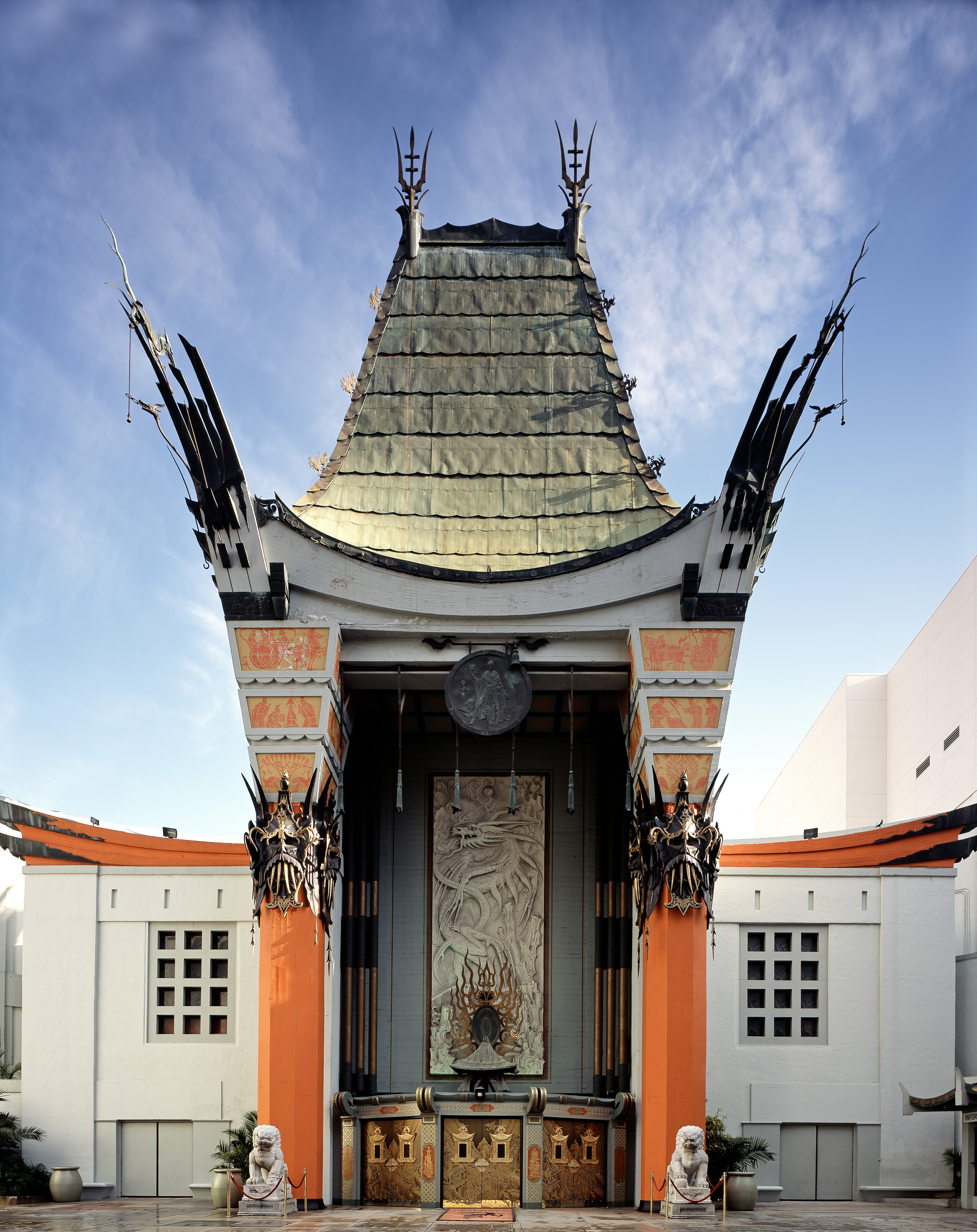
Grauman's Chinese Theatre

Grauman's Chinese Theatre opened in 1927 and became a notable location for holding movie premieres. It is best known for the numerous hand- and footprint impressions left by celebrities in the cement walkway in front of the theater. This practice was started accidentally when Norma Talmadge stepped on the wet cement here. However, the first formal hand imprints were of Douglas Fairbanks Sr. and Mary Pickford stars of the silent movies. Apart from the cement foot and hand prints of the stars, the theater building has a red pagoda which is 30 ft in height. It was built with financing provided by Sid Grauman and partners and also Mary Pickford and Douglas Fairbanks. However, the bells and other Chinese decorations and artifacts were imported. It was built at a cost of $2 million by Chinese artisans under the guidance of Moon Quon, the Chinese poet and filmmaker. In 1968, it was listed as an historic and cultural landmark. Cecil B. DeMille's film The King of Kings was premiered here. Befittingly, 85 years later a Chinese TV maker TCL bought this for $5 million in 2012.

== 1928–1929 ==
In 1928, the construction of City Hall was completed, which had been authorized in 1922 to replace the old 1888 Romanesque City Hall. This building is a skyscraper built over a colonnaded base, to project a sense of power and prestige on the hall.

In 1928, the Los Angeles City Council selected 640 acres (1.00 sq mi; 260 ha) in the southern part of Westchester for the city's new airport. The fields of wheat, barley, and lima beans were converted into dirt landing strips without any terminal buildings. It was named Mines Field after William W. Mines, the real estate agent who arranged the deal. The first structure, Hangar One, was erected in 1929 and is listed on the National Register of Historic Places.

== Gallery ==
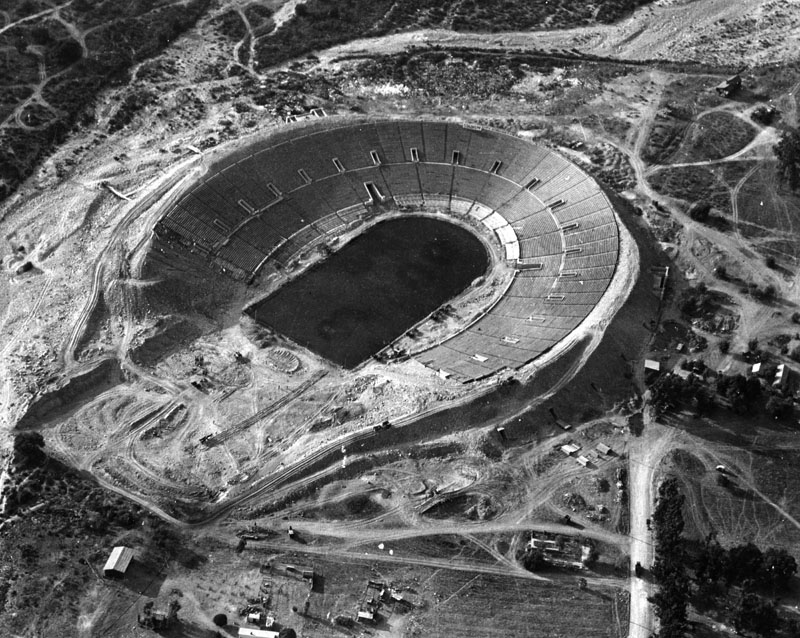
Rose Bowl stadium (built 1921–1922)

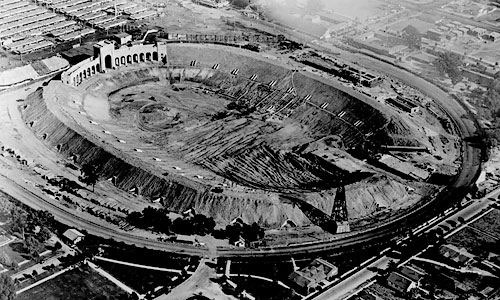
Los Angeles Memorial Coliseum (built 1921–1923)

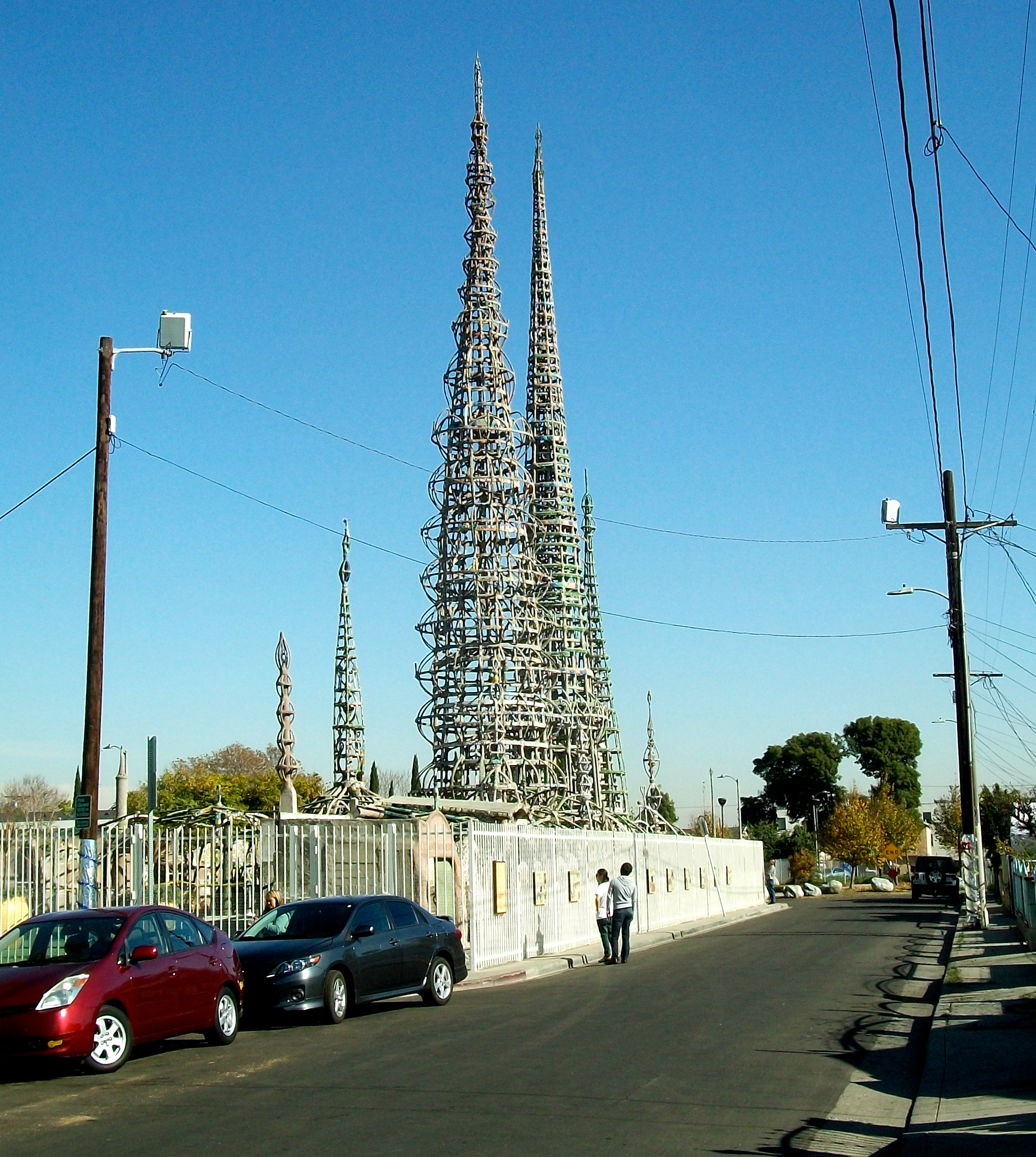
Watts Towers (construction started 1921)

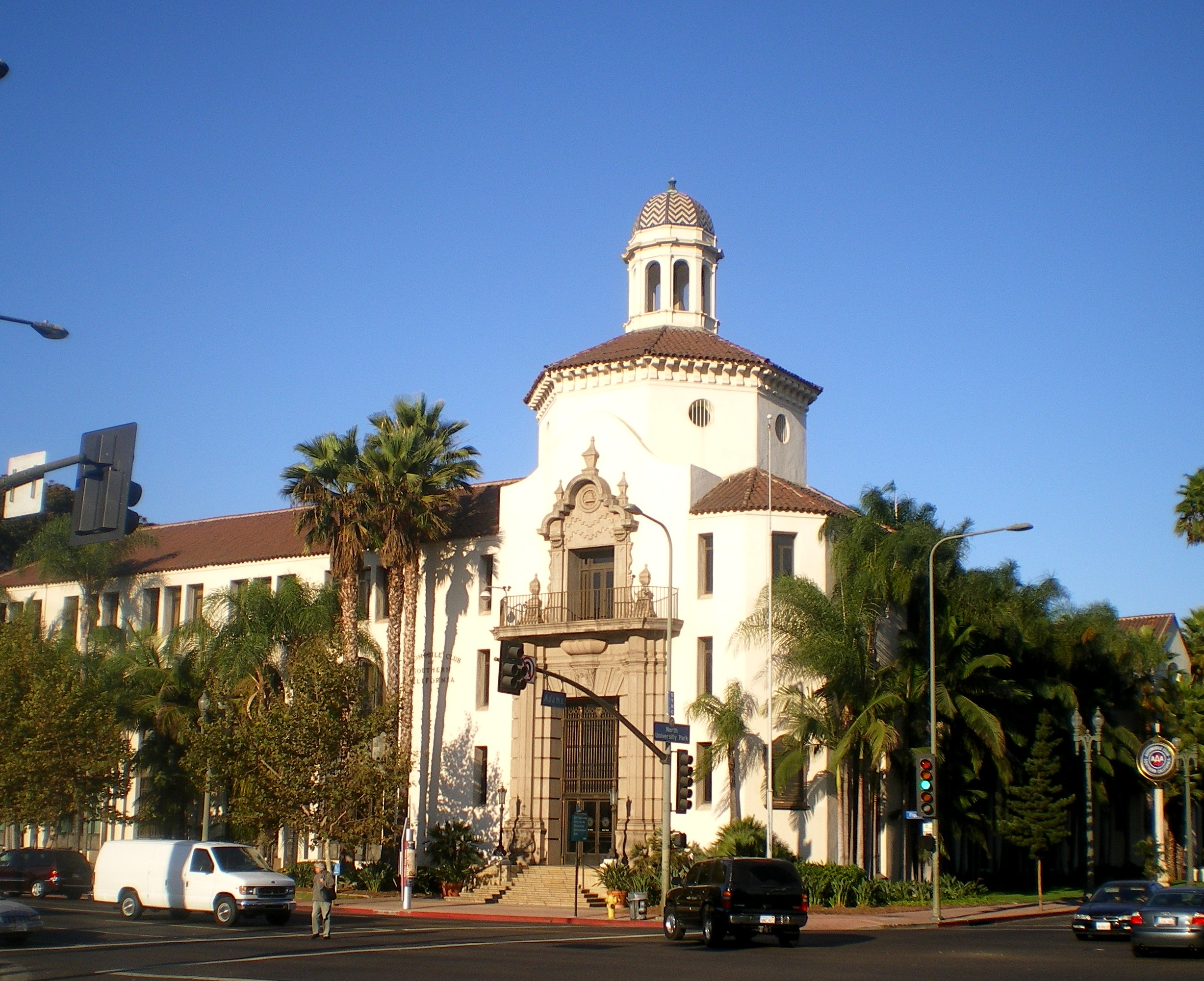
Automobile Club of Southern California (built 1922)

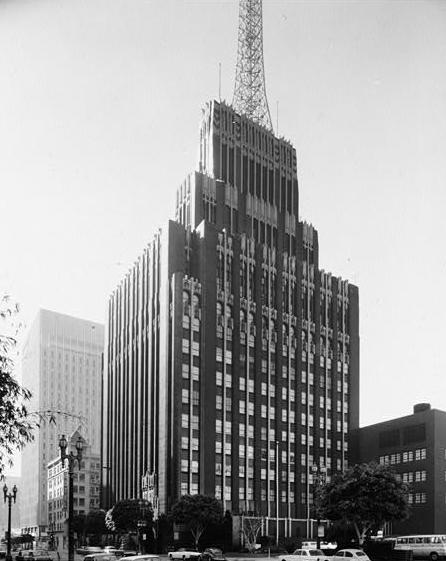
Richfield Tower (built 1928–29, demolished 1969)

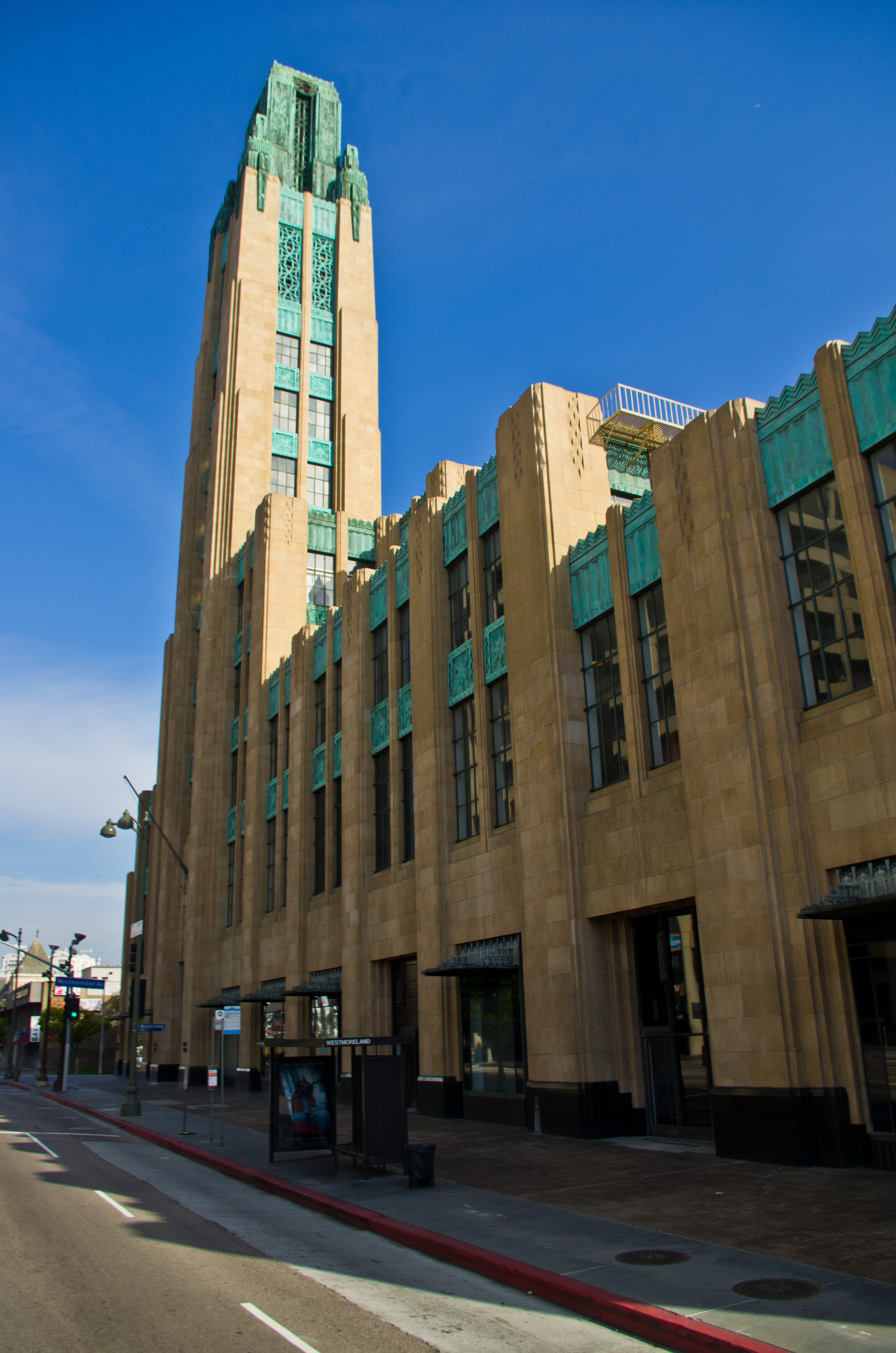
Bullocks Wilshire (built 1929)

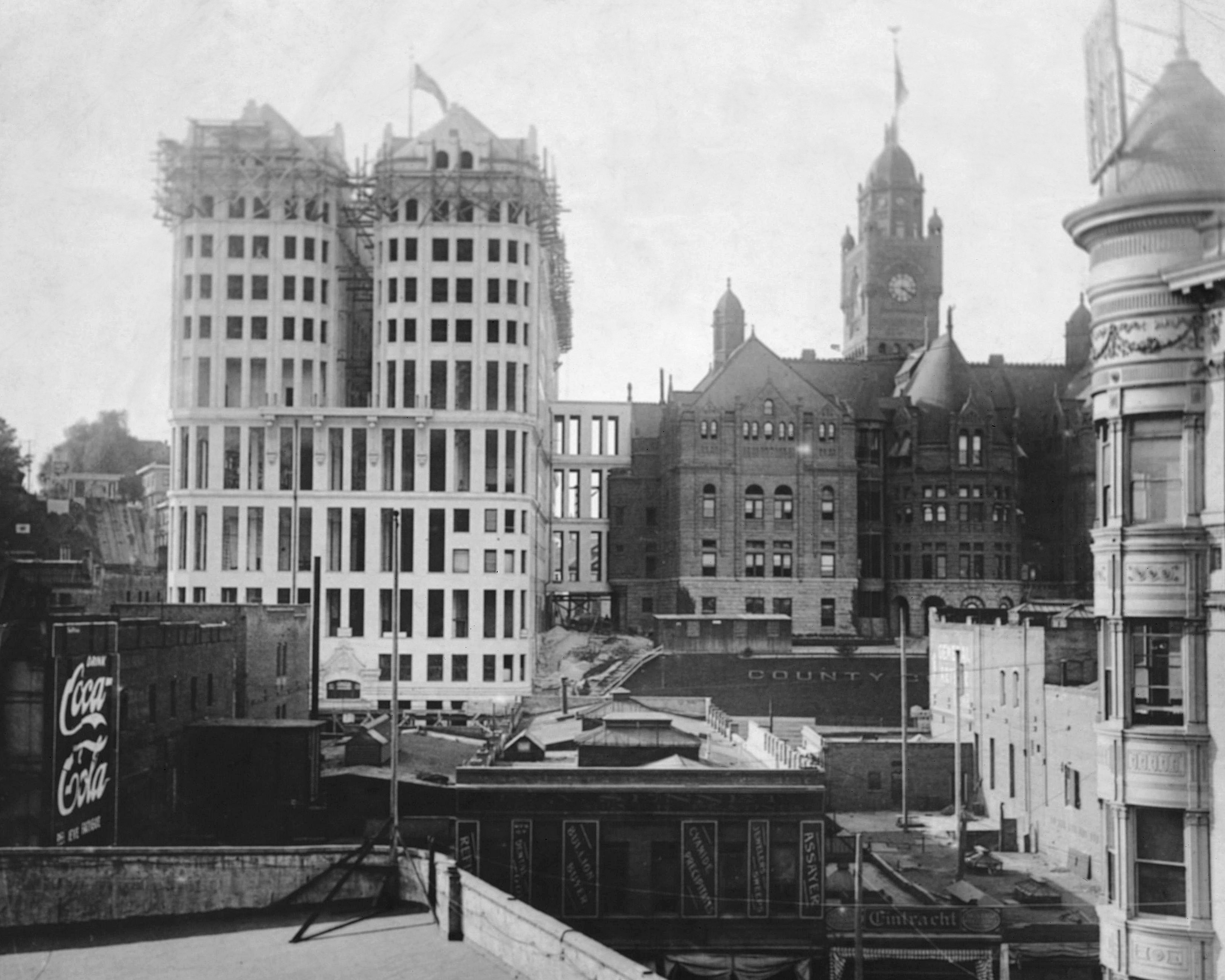
Construction of the Hall of Records, c. 1920

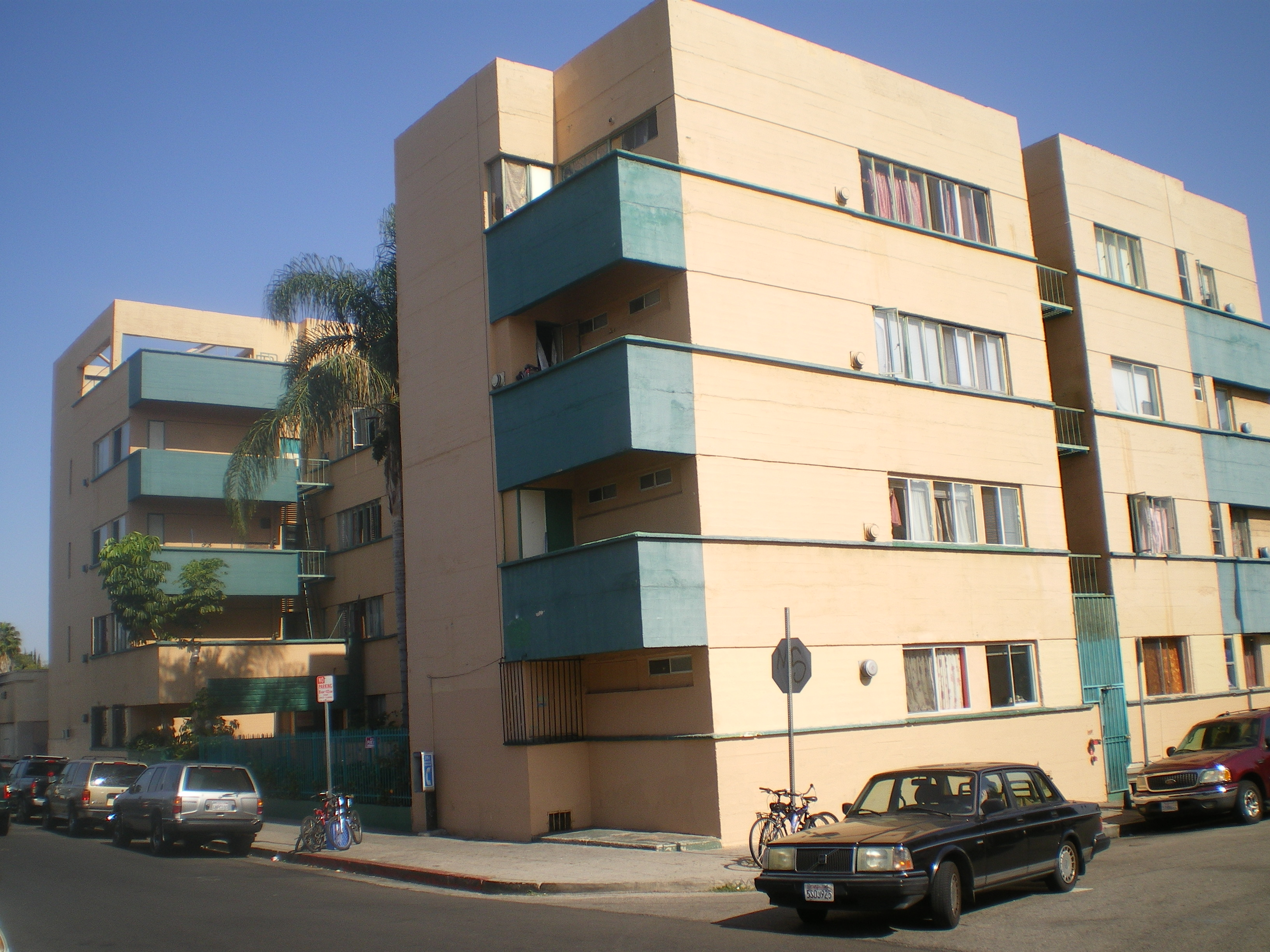
Jardinette Apartments, (built 1927–28)

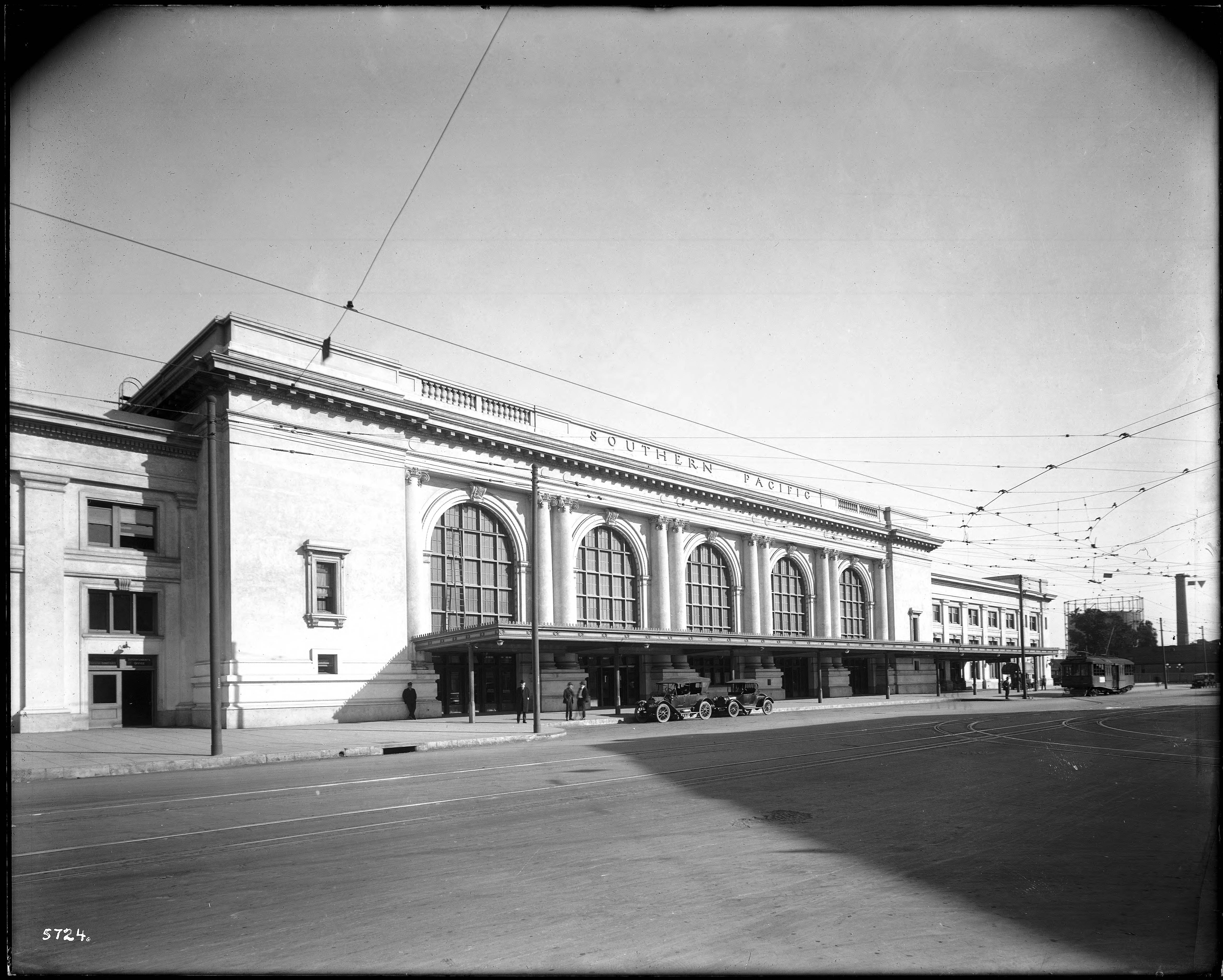
Exterior view of the Southern Pacific Depot, ca.1918

== See also ==
- Bibliography of California history
- Bibliography of Los Angeles
- Outline of the history of Los Angeles

== Bibliography ==
- Dickey, Jeff (April 1, 2011). The Rough Guide to Los Angeles & Southern California. Rough Guides. ISBN 978-1-4053-8281-6.
- Gebhard, David; Winter, Robert (2003) [1985 (as Architecture in Los Angeles: A Complete Guide]. An Architectural Guidebook to Los Angeles (Revised and updated ed.). Salt Lake City: Gibbs Smith. ISBN 1-58685-308-2.
- MacCann, Richard Dyer (January 1, 1996). Films of the 1920s. Scarecrow Press Inc. pp. 60–. ISBN 978-0-8108-3256-5.
- Sitton, Tom; Deverell, William Francis (2001). Metropolis in the Making: Los Angeles in the 1920s. University of California Press. p. 2. ISBN 978-0-520-22627-2.
- Starr, Kevin (October 1991). Material Dreams: Southern California Through the 1920s. Oxford University Press. ISBN 978-0-19-507260-0.
