= History of Israelis in Los Angeles =

Los Angeles, California contains one of the largest concentrations of Israeli Americans in the United States. Israeli Americans are those who are Israelis through nationality and/or citizenship. While the vast majority of the Israeli American populace is Jewish, it is also made up of various other ethnic and religious minorities.

== History ==
=== Israeli Jews in Los Angeles ===
Jerusalem-born Rabbi Solomon Michael Neches (1891-1954) was the first rabbi of the synagogue originally named Congregation Talmud Torah. Rabbi Neches was heavily involved in establishing Kashrut laws in California and Orthodox Jewish education in Los Angeles. In 1930, the "Agudath Eretz Israel of Los Angeles" was established as a unique Zionist-Jewish organization in the American Southwest, with Rabbi Neches serving as president.

A September 1930 article from the B'nai B'rith Messenger announced a celebration of the founding of Agudath Eretz Israel of Los Angeles, noting that the event hosted features of Jewish life and talent from Mandatory Palestine, including Haluzim (pioneer) song and dance as well as the guest speaker Rev. Cantor Naftali Herz Halevi.

=== Post-1948 history ===
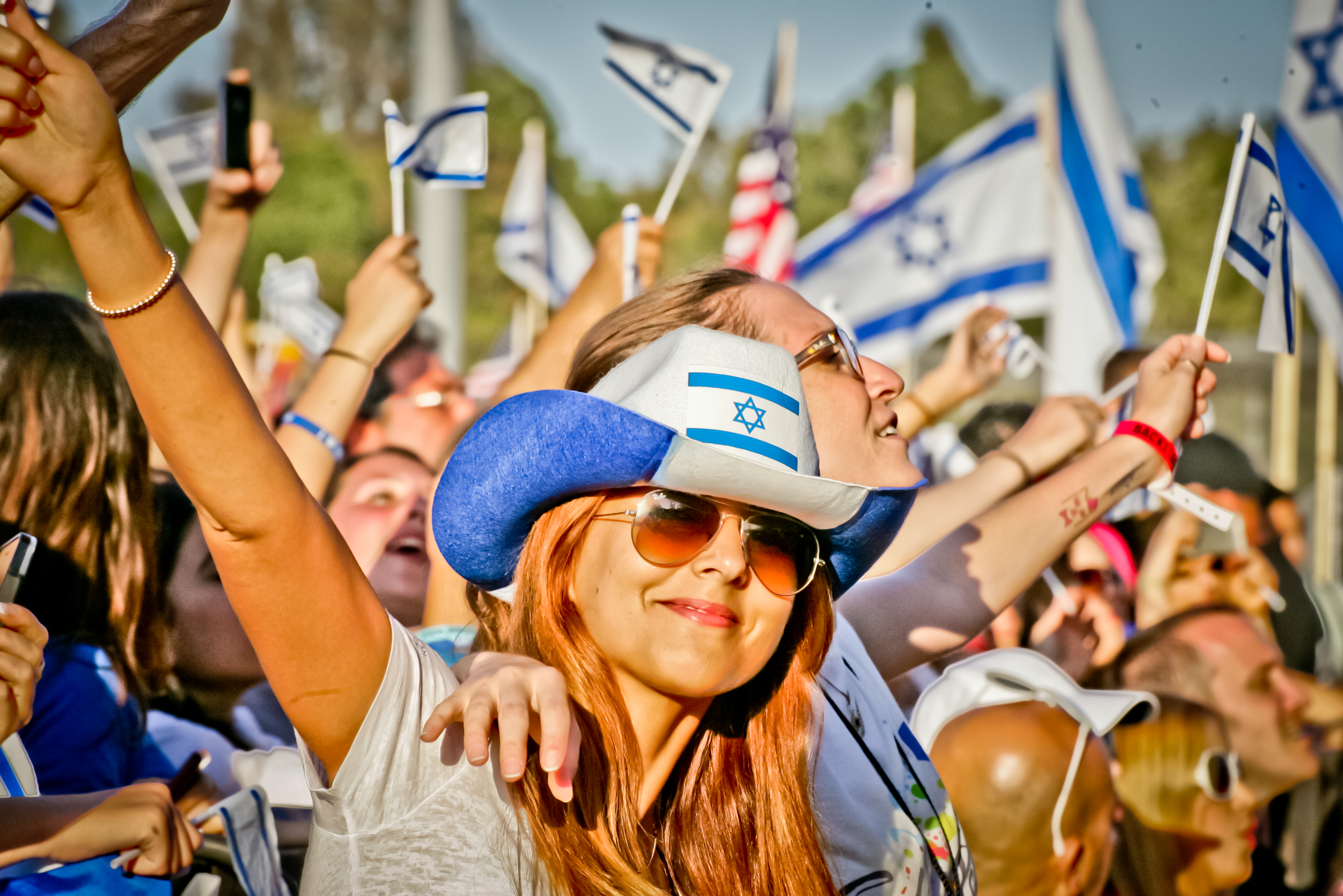
Israeli and other Jewish Americans celebrating Yom Ha'atzmaut at the Celebrate Israel Festival in Cheviot Hills, Los Angeles

Many Israeli Americans in Los Angeles are first, second, or third-generation Americans and are the descendants of early Israeli immigrants arriving in the 1950s; while others are more recent immigrants who began moving to Los Angeles in a wave of migration that began in the 1970's continued to this day. The Israeli American community of Los Angeles has risen to prominence in local business, government, and culture. Los Angeles is home to the world's first Israeli Community Center (ICC), similar to a JCC, located in the San Fernando Valley.

== Population ==
Los Angeles is home to the largest population in the Israeli diaspora, with more than 250,000 Israeli Americans living in the Los Angeles, according to the Israeli American Council. The Israeli community of Los Angeles are mainly residents of the San Fernando Valley and the Westside of Los Angeles. The communities of Encino and Tarzana in particular are noted for their large Israeli populations.

== Notable people ==
- Ari Emanuel
- Anat Fabrikant
- Gal Gadot
- Omri Katz
- Hila Klein
- Ynon Kreiz
- Haim Saban
- Gene Simmons (born Chaim Witz)
- Yael Shelbia

== See also ==
- Bibliography of California history
- Bibliography of Los Angeles
- Outline of the history of Los Angeles
