= Rodney King (film) =

- Directed by: Spike Lee
- Written by: Roger Guenveur Smith
- Produced by: Steven Adams; Bob L. Johnson; Spike Lee; Roger Guenveur Smith
- Starring: Roger Guenveur Smith
- Edited by: Randy Wilkins
- Music by: Marc Anthony Thompson
- Distributed by: Netflix
- Release date: April 28, 2017
- Running time: 52 minutes
- Country: USA
- Language: English

Rodney King is one-man show by Roger Guenveur Smith. Smith performs as a multiplicity of voices alternately supporting and opposing Rodney King's plight. It premiered in 2014 at The Public Theater as part of the Under the Radar Festival. A film version of the monologue was directed by Spike Lee and released in 2017. Smith was inspired by King's death in 2012 and researched, wrote and improvised the play over the course of a few weeks. It began streaming on April 28, 2017.
