= The Riot Within =

Autobiography by police brutality victim Rodney King

The Riot Within: My Journey from Rebellion to Redemption
- First edition
- Author: Rodney King, Lawrence J Spagnola
- Genre: Historical, Memoir
- Published: April 2012
- Publisher: HarperCollins

The Riot Within: My Journey from Rebellion to Redemption is a 2012 autobiography of Rodney King (1965–2012). Best known from a widely circulated videotape showing him as a victim of brutality by the Los Angeles Police Department, he became a civil rights icon. The book is co-authored by Lawrence J. Spagnola.

== Context ==
King discusses his childhood growing up among loving parents but at times an abusive father, and their shared love for fishing. His father was alcoholic, and he also has had to deal with alcoholism in his adult life. King speaks highly of his teacher Robert E. Jones at John Muir High School, who was openly gay. He discusses his descent into addiction and alcoholism and his run-ins with the law, including when he was stopped and beaten by Los Angeles Police officers. This event was videotaped by a bystander, and carried on national news. There was outrage when the officers were acquitted of charges of excessive force. King reflects on his multicultural heritage. He said that he did not want the 1992 Los Angeles riots that followed the acquittal of the officers at trial.

King reflects his reluctance as a civil rights icon, after a federal trial in which two of the officers were convicted. The city of LA made a settlement with him, paying damages. He felt as if he attracted opportunists and was used by some. He continued to battle addiction and other issues. The book finally wraps up with his obtaining sobriety and discussing lessons he has learned.

== Reception ==
Publishers Weekly described The Riot Within as a "tell-all memoir" in which King recounted his childhood, the 1991 beating by Los Angeles police officers, the Los Angeles riots, later legal proceedings, and his struggles with alcoholism. The review concluded that, although the book was "by no means groundbreaking", King's account of his own story was "an interesting read".

Kirkus Reviews was more critical, writing that the book "rarely plumbs new depths of insight on America's struggles with racial violence". The review said King was strongest when sharing personal details, but found that the book's courtroom and historical material often overwhelmed its personal reflection.

== Amazon categorization controversy ==
The Riot Within was classified by Amazon as a "Criminal Biography" and was listed next to books about serial killers, mob bosses and hackers. Amazon did not respond to a request for a comment from the Los Angeles Times about the error. The book was eventually reclassified under "Memoir and Historical".
