= Rodney King =

Black American victim of police brutality (1965–2012)

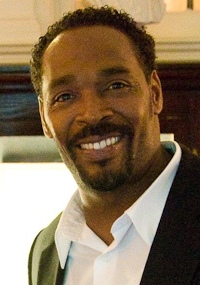
- King in April 2012
- Born: Rodney Glen King; April 2, 1965; Sacramento, California, U.S.
- Died: June 17, 2012 (aged 47); Rialto, California, U.S.
- Resting place: Forest Lawn Memorial Park, Hollywood Hills
- Known for: Victim of a police brutality case that led to public protests, riots, and police reform
- Notable work: The Riot Within (2012)
- Spouses: Danetta Lyles (m. 1985; div. 1988) Crystal Waters (m. 1989; div. 1996)
- Partner: Cynthia Kelley (2010–2012)
- Children: 3

Rodney Glen King (April 2, 1965 – June 17, 2012) was an African-American man who on March 3, 1991 became a victim of police brutality when he was severely beaten by officers of the Los Angeles Police Department (LAPD) during his arrest after a high-speed pursuit on the California freeway and expressway system, having initially evaded arrest. George Holliday, an uninvolved resident, saw and filmed the incident from his nearby balcony and then sent the footage, which showed an unarmed King on the ground being beaten, to KTLA, a local news station who broadcast the film, which was then rebroadcast by other stations casting a worldwide spotlight on the LAPD and King.

King was taken to Pacifica Hospital after his arrest where he was found to have suffered a fractured facial bone, a broken right ankle, and multiple bruises and lacerations. Nurses later reported that the officers who accompanied King openly joked and bragged about the number of times they had hit him. Blood and urine samples taken five hours after his arrest measured King's blood alcohol content at 0.075%, below the legal limit of 0.08%. The LAPD initially charged King with "felony evading", but later dropped the charge.

Upon his release, King spoke to reporters from his wheelchair, with his injuries evident: a broken right leg in a cast, his face badly cut and swollen, bruises on his body, and a burn area on his chest where he had been jolted with a stun gun. King described the beating and also stated that he was scared for his life when the officers drew their guns on him.

Three of the four officers were charged with excessive force. Within hours of their acquittals the 1992 Los Angeles riots started, sparked by outrage among minorities over the trial's verdict as well as long-standing societal issues. King appeared on television to advocate for peace, which has often been paraphrased as "Can we all just get along?".

The federal government prosecuted a separate civil rights case, obtaining grand jury indictments of the four officers for violations of King's civil rights. In April 1993, two of the officers were found guilty in federal court and sentenced to prison while the other two were acquitted. In a separate civil lawsuit in 1994, a jury found the City of Los Angeles liable and awarded King $3.8 million.

== Early life ==
Rodney Glen King was born in Sacramento, California, on April 2, 1965, the son of Ronald and Odessa King. He and his four siblings grew up in Altadena, California, a suburb of Los Angeles. By the fourth grade, King and his brother were frequently forced to help his father in cleaning commercial office buildings, working as late as 2 a.m. on school nights; his father sometimes beat him. King began drinking in junior high school with friends. King attended John Muir High School and often talked about being inspired by his social science teacher, Robert E. Jones. However, during his senior year, King dropped out of high school to take a job in the construction industry. His father, Ronald King, died in 1984 at age 42.

On November 3, 1989, King robbed a store in Monterey Park, California. He threatened the Korean store owner with an iron bar. King then hit the store owner with a pole before fleeing the scene. King stole $200 in cash during the robbery. He was convicted and sentenced to two years' imprisonment. He was released on December 27, 1990, after serving one year in prison.

== Marriage and family ==
King had a daughter with his girlfriend, Carmen Simpson. He later married Danetta Lyles (cousin of Texas hate crime victim James Byrd Jr.) and had a daughter. King and Lyles eventually divorced. He later remarried and had a daughter with Crystal Waters. This marriage also ended in divorce.

== 1991 police assault in Los Angeles ==
Beating of Rodney King
- Screenshot of King being beaten by LAPD officers
- Location: 34°16′23″N 118°23′37″W; Los Angeles, California, U.S.
- Date: March 3, 1991; 35 years ago c. 12:45 a.m. (PST)
- Attack type: Beating, police brutality
- Victim: Rodney Glen King
- Charges: Federal charges: Briseño, Powell, Wind: Willfully and intentionally using unreasonable force; Koon: Willfully permitting and failing to take action to stop an unlawful assault; State charges: Assault with a deadly weapon; Excessive use of force; Filing a false incident report (Koon and Powell)
- Sentence: Koon and Powell: 2 1/2 years in federal prison
- Convicted: Stacey Cornell Koon; Laurence M. Powell

Early in the morning of Sunday, March 3, 1991, King, with his friends Bryant Allen and Freddie Helms, were driving a 1988 Hyundai Excel west on the Foothill Freeway (Interstate 210) in the San Fernando Valley of Los Angeles. The three had spent the night watching basketball and drinking at a friend's house in Los Angeles. At 12:30 a.m., officers Tim and Melanie Singer, husband and wife members of the California Highway Patrol, noticed King's car speeding on the freeway. They pursued King with lights and sirens, and the pursuit reached 117 mph (188 km/h), while King refused to pull over. King would later say he fled the police hoping to avoid a driving under the influence charge and the parole violation that could follow.

King left the freeway near the Hansen Dam Recreation Area and the pursuit continued through residential streets at speeds ranging from 55 to 80 miles per hour (90 to 130 km/h), and through at least one red light. By this point, several police cars and a police helicopter had joined in the pursuit. After approximately 8 miles (13 km), officers cornered King in his car. The first five Los Angeles Police Department (LAPD) officers to arrive were Stacey Koon, Laurence Powell, Timothy Wind, Theodore Briseno and Rolando Solano.

=== Beating ===
Officer Tim Singer ordered King and his two passengers to exit the vehicle and to lie face down on the ground. Allen claims that he was manhandled, kicked, stomped, taunted and threatened. Helms was hit on the head while lying on the ground; he was treated for a laceration on the top of his head. His bloody baseball cap was turned over to police. King remained in the car. When he emerged, King was reported to have giggled, to have patted the ground and waved to the police helicopter overhead. King grabbed his buttocks, which Officer Melanie Singer took to mean King was reaching for a weapon, though he was later found to be unarmed. She drew her pistol and pointed it at King, ordering him to lie on the ground. Singer approached, gun drawn, preparing to arrest him. At this point, Koon, the ranking officer at the scene, told Singer that the LAPD was taking command and ordered all officers to holster their weapons.

According to the official report, LAPD Sergeant Koon ordered the four other LAPD officers at the scene—Briseno, Powell, Solano and Wind—to subdue and handcuff King using a technique called a "swarm", where multiple officers grab a suspect with empty hands, to overcome potential resistance quickly. The four officers claim King resisted attempts to restrain him when he stood up to remove Officers Powell and Briseno from his back. Both King and witnesses dispute that claim. The officers would also testify later that they believed King was under the influence of phencyclidine (PCP), although King's toxicology tested negative for the drug.

At this point, Holliday's video recording shows King on the ground after being tasered by Koon. He rises and rushes toward Powell—as argued in court, either to attack Powell or to flee—and King and Powell collided in a rush. Taser wire can be seen on King's body. Officer Powell strikes King with his baton, and King is knocked to the ground. Powell strikes King several more times with his baton. Briseno moves in, attempting to stop Powell from striking again, and Powell stands back. Koon reportedly said, "Stop! Stop! That's enough! That's enough!" King rises again, to his knees; Powell and Wind are seen hitting King with their batons.

Koon acknowledged ordering the continued use of batons, directing Powell and Wind to strike King with "power strokes". According to Koon, Powell and Wind used "bursts of power strokes, then backed off". In the videotape, King continues to try to stand again. Koon orders the officers to "hit his joints, hit the wrists, hit his elbows, hit his knees, hit his ankles". Officers Wind, Briseno, and Powell attempted numerous baton strikes on King, resulting in some misses but with 33 blows hitting King, plus seven kicks. The officers again "swarm" King, but this time a total of eight officers are involved in the swarm. King is placed in handcuffs and cord cuffs, restraining his arms and legs. King is dragged on his abdomen to the side of the road to await the arrival of emergency medical rescue.

=== Holliday's video ===
Plumbing salesman and amateur videographer George Holliday's videotape of the beating was shot on his camcorder from his apartment near the intersection of Foothill Boulevard and Osborne Street in Lake View Terrace. Two days later (March 5), Holliday called LAPD headquarters at Parker Center to let the police department know that he had a videotape of the incident. Still, he could not find anyone interested in seeing the video. He went to KTLA, a local television station, with his recording. KTLA's Warren Wilson was the first reporter to take on the story, interviewing King inside his jail ward. Holliday, whose video camera was in another part of his residence, was unable to retrieve it until the officers were already in the act of beating King. The footage as a whole became an instant media sensation. Portions were aired numerous times, and it "turned what would otherwise have been a violent, but soon forgotten, encounter between the Los Angeles police and an uncooperative suspect into one of the most widely watched and discussed incidents of its kind".

Several "copwatch" organizations subsequently were started throughout the United States to safeguard against police abuse, including an umbrella group, October 22 Coalition to Stop Police Brutality. In 1992, these clips were added in the opening credits of Malcolm X. On September 19, 2021, Holliday died from complications of COVID-19.

== Post-arrest events ==
=== Aftermath ===
King was taken to Pacifica Hospital after his arrest, where he was found to have suffered a fractured facial bone, a broken right ankle, and multiple bruises and lacerations. In a negligence claim filed with the city, King alleged he had suffered "11 skull fractures, permanent brain damage, broken [bones and teeth], kidney failure [and] emotional and physical trauma." Blood and urine samples were taken from King five hours after his arrest. At this time, King's blood alcohol content was measured to be 0.075%. This indicated that King was intoxicated during the initial arrest as defined by California law, but with the samples taken after a five-hour delay, were then below the legal limit of 0.08%. The tests also showed traces of marijuana (26 ng/ml). Pacifica Hospital nurses reported that the officers who accompanied King (including Wind) openly joked and bragged about the number of times they had hit King. Officers obtained King's identification from his clothes pockets at that time. King later sued the city for damages, and a jury awarded him $3.8 million, as well as $1.7 million in attorney's fees. The city did not pursue charges against King for driving while intoxicated and evading arrest. District Attorney Ira Reiner believed there was insufficient evidence for prosecution. His successor Gil Garcetti thought that by December 1992, too much time had passed to charge King with evading arrest; he also noted that the statute of limitations on drunk driving had passed.

=== Charges against police officers and trial ===
At a press conference, announcing the four officers involved would be disciplined, and three would face criminal charges, Los Angeles police chief Daryl Gates said: "We believe the officers used excessive force taking him into custody. In our review, we find that officers struck him with batons between fifty-three and fifty-six times." The LAPD initially charged King with "felony evading", but later dropped the charge.

The Los Angeles County District Attorney subsequently charged four police officers, including one sergeant, with assault and use of excessive force. Due to the extensive media coverage of the arrest, the trial received a change of venue from Los Angeles County to Simi Valley in neighboring Ventura County. The jury was composed of ten white jurors, one biracial male, one Latino, and one Asian American. The prosecutor, Terry L. White, was black. Mr. White was a Deputy District Attorney for Los Angeles County with eight years of experience. The District Attorney's office denied that race was taken into account when selecting the prosecutor, and multiple trial attorneys from Los Angeles agreed that race likely played no role.

On April 29, 1992, the seventh day of jury deliberations, the jury acquitted all four officers of assault and acquitted three of the four of using excessive force. The jury could not agree on a verdict for the fourth officer charged with using excessive force. The verdicts were based in part on the first three seconds of a blurry, 13-second segment of the videotape that, according to journalist Lou Cannon, had not been aired by television news stations in their broadcasts.

The first two seconds of videotape, contrary to the claims made by the accused officers, show King attempting to flee past Laurence Powell. During the next one minute and 19 seconds, King is beaten continuously by the officers. The officers testified that they tried to physically restrain King before the starting point of the videotape, but King was able to throw them off.

Afterward, the prosecution suggested that the jurors may have acquitted the officers because of becoming desensitized to the violence of the beating, as the defense played the videotape repeatedly in slow motion, breaking it down until its emotional impact was lost.

Outside the Simi Valley courthouse where the acquittals were delivered, county sheriff's deputies protected Stacey Koon from angry protesters on the way to his car. Movie director John Singleton, who was in the crowd at the courthouse, predicted, "By having this verdict, what these people did, they lit the fuse to a bomb."

Following a hung jury in Officer Laurence Powell's initial state court trial for assault, a retrial was postponed by Superior Court Judge Stanley Weisberg, pending the federal grand jury trial of Powell for violating King's civil rights. Judge Weisberg stated "I don't think that's in anyone's best interest, to have three trials on the same subject matter involving the same defendant." Subsequent to his trial by the federal grand jury, the assault charge against Officer Laurence Powell was dismissed in state court.

=== Christopher Commission ===
Los Angeles Mayor Tom Bradley created the Independent Commission on the Los Angeles Police Department, also known as the Christopher Commission, in April 1991. Led by attorney Warren Christopher, it was created to conduct "a full and fair examination of the structure and operation of the LAPD", including its recruitment and training practices, internal disciplinary system, and citizen complaint system.

== Los Angeles riots and aftermath ==
Though few people at first considered race an essential factor in the case, including Rodney King's attorney, Steven Lerman, the Holliday videotape stirred deep resentment among black people in Los Angeles and other major cities in the United States, where they had often complained of police abuse against their communities. The officers' jury consisted of Ventura County residents: ten white, one mestizo or aboriginal, one Asian. Lead prosecutor Terry White was black. On April 29, 1992, the jury acquitted three of the officers but could not agree on one of the charges against Powell.

Los Angeles Mayor Tom Bradley said, "The jury's verdict will not blind us to what we saw on that videotape. The men who beat Rodney King do not deserve to wear the uniform of the LAPD." President George H. W. Bush said, "Viewed from outside the trial, it was hard to understand how the verdict could possibly square with the video. Those civil rights leaders with whom I met were stunned. And so was I, and so was Barbara, and so were my kids."

Within hours of the acquittals, the 1992 Los Angeles riots began, lasting six days. Black Americans were outraged by the verdicts and began rioting in the streets. By the time law enforcement, the California Army National Guard, the United States Army, and the United States Marine Corps restored order, the riots had resulted in 63 deaths, 2,383 injuries, more than 7,000 fires, damage to 3,100 businesses, and nearly $1 billion in financial losses. Smaller riots occurred in other U.S. cities such as San Francisco, Las Vegas, Seattle, and as far east as Atlanta and New York City. A civil disturbance occurred on Yonge Street in Toronto, Canada when Canadians gathered to protest the acquittal in Los Angeles as well as a local police killing of a black man in Toronto two days prior.

During the riots, on May 1, 1992, King made a television appearance pleading for an end to the riots:

I just want to say – you know – can we, can we all get along? Can we, can we get along? Can we stop making it horrible for the older people and the kids? And ... I mean we've got enough smog in Los Angeles let alone to deal with setting these fires and things ... It's just not right. It's not right, and it's not going to change anything. We'll get our justice. They've won the battle, but they haven't won the war. We'll get our day in court, and that's all we want. And, just, uh, I love – I'm neutral. I love every – I love people of color. I'm not like they're making me out to be. We've got to quit. We've got to quit; I mean, after all, I could understand the first – upset for the first two hours after the verdict, but to go on, to keep going on like this and to see the security guard shot on the ground – it's just not right. It's just not right, because those people will never go home to their families again. And uh, I mean, please, we can, we can get along here. We all can get along. We just gotta. We gotta. I mean, we're all stuck here for a while. Let's, you know, let's try to work it out. Let's try to beat it, you know. Let's try to work it out.

King's plea has often been paraphrased with variations of the first line (e.g., "Can we all just get along?").

== Federal civil rights trial of officers ==
After the acquittals and the riots, the United States Department of Justice (DOJ) sought indictments of the police officers for violations of King's civil rights. On May 7, federal prosecutors began presenting evidence to the federal grand jury in Los Angeles. On August 4, the grand jury returned indictments against the three officers for "willfully and intentionally using unreasonable force" and against Sergeant Koon for "willfully permitting and failing to take action to stop the unlawful assault" on King. Based on these indictments, a trial of the four officers in the United States District Court for the Central District of California began on February 25, 1993.

On March 9 of the 1993 trial, King took the witness stand and described to the jury the events as he remembered them. The jury found Officer Laurence Powell and Sergeant Stacey Koon guilty, and they were subsequently sentenced to 30 months in prison. Timothy Wind and Theodore Briseno were acquitted of all charges, but both were soon dismissed by the LAPD for their roles in the beating.

During the three-hour sentencing hearing, US District Judge John G. Davies accepted much of the defense version of the beating. He strongly criticized King, who, he said, provoked the officers' initial actions. Davies said that only the final six or so baton blows by Powell were unlawful. The first 55 seconds of the videotaped portion of the incident, during which the vast majority of the blows were delivered, was within the law because the officers were attempting to subdue a suspect who was resisting efforts to take him into custody.

Davies found that King's provocative behavior began with his "remarkable consumption of alcoholic beverage" and continued through a high-speed chase, refusal to submit to police orders and an aggressive charge toward Powell. Davies made several findings in support of the officers' version of events. He concluded that Officer Powell never intentionally struck King in the head, and "Powell's baton blow that broke King's leg was not illegal because King was still resisting and rolling around on the ground, and breaking bones in resistant suspects is permissible under police policy."

Mitigation cited by the judge in determining the length of the prison sentence included the suffering the officers had undergone because of the extensive publicity their case had received, high legal bills that were still unpaid, the impending loss of their careers as police officers, their higher risks of abuse while in prison, and their undergoing two trials. The judge acknowledged that the two trials did not legally constitute double jeopardy, but raised "the specter of unfairness".

These mitigations were critical to the validity of the sentences imposed because federal sentencing guidelines called for much longer prison terms in the range of 70 to 87 months. The low sentences were controversial and were appealed by the prosecution. In a 1994 ruling, the United States Court of Appeals for the Ninth Circuit rejected all the grounds cited by Judge Davies and extended the terms. The defense appealed the case to the US Supreme Court. Both Koon and Powell were released from prison while they appealed to the Ninth Circuit's ruling, having served their original 30-month sentences with time off for good behavior. On June 14, 1996, the high court partially reversed the lower court in a ruling, unanimous in its most important aspects, which gave a strong endorsement to judicial discretion, even under sentencing guidelines intended to produce uniformity.

== Later life ==
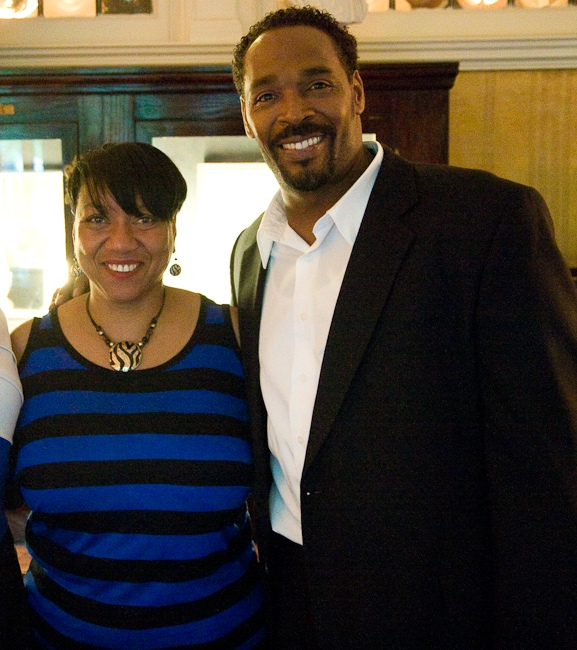
King with fiancée Cynthia Kelley a few months before his death. Kelley was one of the jurors in King's civil suit against the city of Los Angeles when he was awarded $3.8 million.

Los Angeles Mayor Tom Bradley offered King $200,000 and a four-year college education funded by the city of Los Angeles. King refused and sued the city, and was subsequently awarded $3.8 million. Bryant Allen, one of the passengers in King's car on the night of the incident, received $35,000 in his lawsuit against the city of Los Angeles. The estate of Freddie Helms, the other passenger, settled for $20,000; Helms died in a car crash on June 29, 1991, age 20, in Pasadena. King invested a portion of his settlement in a record label, Straight Alta-Pazz Records, hoping to employ minority employees, but it went out of business. With help from a ghostwriter, he later wrote and published a memoir.

King was subject to further arrests and convictions for driving violations after the 1991 incident, as he struggled with alcoholism and drug addiction. In May 1991, King was arrested on suspicion of having tried to run down an undercover vice officer in Hollywood, but no charges were filed. In 1992, he was arrested for injuring his wife, Crystal King. Crystal ultimately declined to file a complaint. On August 21, 1993, King crashed his car into a block wall in downtown Los Angeles. He was convicted of driving under the influence of alcohol, fined, and entered a rehabilitation program, after which he was placed on probation. In July 1995, King was arrested by Alhambra police after hitting Crystal with his car and knocking her to the ground during a fight. King had previously been arrested twice on suspicion of abusing her. He was sentenced to 90 days in jail after being convicted of hit and run.

On August 27, 2003, King was arrested again for speeding and running a red light while under the influence of alcohol. He failed to yield to police officers and slammed his vehicle into a house, breaking his pelvis. On November 29, 2007, while riding home on his bicycle, King was shot in the face, arms, and back with pellets from a shotgun. He reported that the attackers were a man and a woman who demanded his bicycle and shot King when he rode away. Police described the wounds as looking as if they came from birdshot.

In May 2008, King checked into the Pasadena Recovery Center in Pasadena, California, where he filmed as a cast member of Season 2 of Celebrity Rehab with Dr. Drew, which premiered in October 2008. Drew Pinsky, who runs the facility, showed concern for King's life and said he would die unless his addictions were treated. King also appeared on Sober House, a Celebrity Rehab spin-off focusing on a sober living environment. During his time on Celebrity Rehab and Sober House, King worked on his addiction and what he said was lingering trauma of the beating. King and Pinsky physically retraced King's path from the night of his beating, eventually reaching the spot where it happened, the site of the Children's Museum of Los Angeles, which is now Discovery Cube Los Angeles.

In 2009, King and other Celebrity Rehab alumni appeared as panel speakers to a new group of addicts at the Pasadena Recovery Center, marking 11 months of sobriety for him. His appearance was aired in the third-season episode "Triggers". King won a celebrity boxing match against Chester, Pennsylvania, police officer Simon Aouad on September 11, 2009, at the Ramada Philadelphia Airport in Essington.

On September 9, 2010, it was confirmed that King was going to marry Cynthia Kelley, who had been a juror in the civil suit he brought against the City of Los Angeles. On March 3, 2011, the 20th anniversary of the beating, the LAPD stopped King for driving erratically and issued him a citation for driving with an expired license. This arrest led to a February 2012 misdemeanor conviction for reckless driving.

The BBC quoted King commenting on his legacy. "Some people feel like I'm some kind of hero. Others hate me. They say I deserved it. Other people, I can hear them mocking me for when I called for an end to the destruction like I'm a fool for believing in peace."

== Memoir ==
In April 2012, King published his memoir, The Riot Within. Co-authored by Lawrence J. Spagnola, the book describes King's turbulent youth as well as his personal account of the arrest, the trials, and the aftermath.

== Death ==
On Father's Day, June 17, 2012, King's fiancée, Kelley, found him dead underwater at the bottom of his swimming pool. King died 28 years to the day after his father, Ronald King, who was found dead in his bathtub.

Police in Rialto received a 911 call from Kelley at about 5:25 a.m. PDT. Responding officers removed King from the pool and performed CPR on him. Still pulseless, King was then transferred to an advanced life support ambulance where paramedics attempted to revive him. King was transported to Arrowhead Regional Medical Center in Colton, California, and was pronounced dead on arrival at 6:11 a.m.; he was 47 years old. The Rialto Police Department began a standard drowning investigation and said there did not appear to be any foul play.

On August 23, 2012, King's autopsy results were released, stating that he died of accidental drowning. The combination of alcohol, cocaine, and PCP found in his system were contributing factors, as were cardiomegaly and focal myocardial fibrosis. The conclusion of the report stated: "The effects of the drugs and alcohol, combined with the subject's heart condition, probably precipitated a cardiac arrhythmia, and the subject, incapacitated in the water, was unable to save himself."

Al Sharpton delivered the eulogy at King's funeral. King is interred at Forest Lawn Memorial Park in the Hollywood Hills neighborhood of Los Angeles, California. "Can we get along" was embroidered on his coffin and also appears on his gravestone.

== Legacy ==
King has become a symbol of police brutality, but his family remembers him as a "human, not a symbol." King never advocated for hatred or violence against the police, pleading, "Can we all get along?" Since his death, his daughter, Lora King, has worked with the LAPD to build bridges between the police and the black community. She also started a nonprofit organisation, the Rodney King Foundation, on behalf of King.

== In popular culture ==
- In 1992, Body Count, a group that is fronted by Ice-T, released "Cop Killer" on their self-titled debut album. The recorded version mentions then-Los Angeles police chief Daryl Gates, and Rodney King. Shortly after the release of Body Count, a jury acquitted the officers and riots broke out in South Central Los Angeles. Following its release, the song was met with opposition, with critics ranging from President George H. W. Bush to various law enforcement agencies, with demands for the song's withdrawal from commercial availability, citing concerns of promoting anti-police sentiment. Ice-T defended the lyrical content of the song as did various other proponents who did not believe that the song posed any risk and remained in support of the song continuing to be released and sold.
- In 1992, Dr. Dre released "The Day The Niggaz Took Over" on his debut studio album The Chronic, a song that refers to the looting, rioting, and anger that occurred after the police who had beaten King were found not guilty of most charges.
- Twilight: Los Angeles, 1992 is a one-woman play written and originally performed by Anna Deavere Smith about the riots following the Rodney King verdict.
- The 2014 one-man play Rodney King by Roger Guenveur Smith is about King.

== See also ==
- History of African Americans in Los Angeles
- Police brutality in the United States
- Race and crime in the United States
- Killing of Tyre Nichols
- Killing of Kelly Thomas
- Murder of George Floyd
- Isaac Woodard
