= Helene Cooper =

Liberian-American journalist (born 1966)

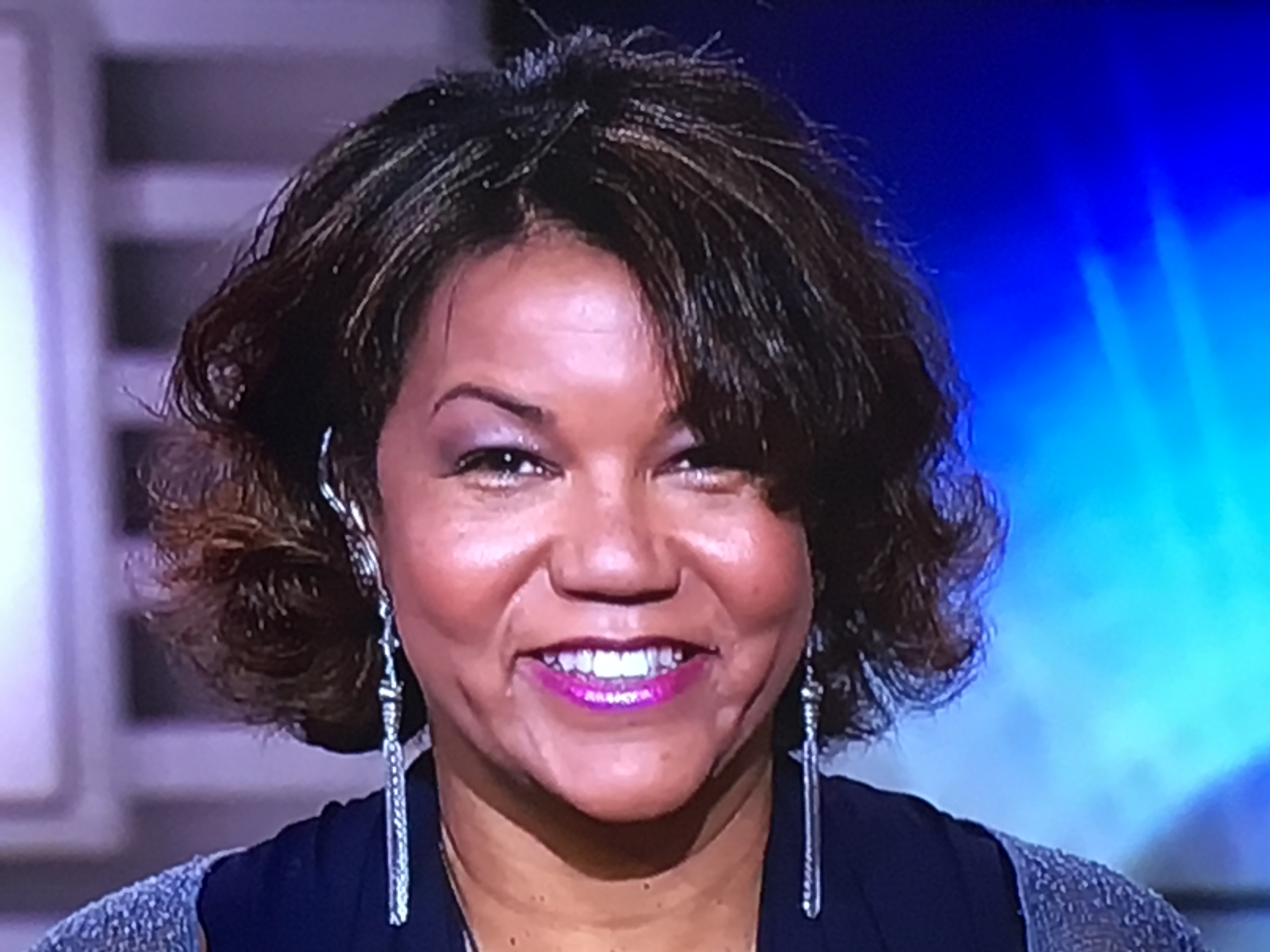
- Helene Cooper
- Born: April 22, 1966 (age 60); Monrovia, Liberia
- Occupation: Journalist
- Notable credit(s): Providence Journal-Bulletin, The New York Times, The Wall Street Journal
- Title: Pentagon correspondent, The New York Times

Helene Cooper (born April 22, 1966) is a Liberian-born American journalist who is a Pentagon correspondent for The New York Times. Before that, she was the paper's White House correspondent in Washington, D.C. She joined the Times in 2004 as assistant editorial page editor.

== Career ==
She was a member of The New York Times reporting team that received the 2015 Pulitzer Prize for International Reporting for coverage of the 2014 Ebola virus epidemic in West Africa. Cooper wrote about Liberian families in a culture of hugging and physical contact, when physical contact could suddenly spread a deadly disease. Liberians who cared for dying family members, as many did, knew they would probably get infected themselves. Other team members were Pam Belluck, Sheri Fink, Adam Nossiter, Norimitsu Onishi, Kevin Sack, and Ben C. Solomon.

At The Wall Street Journal, Cooper wrote about trade, politics, race, and foreign policy at the Washington and Atlanta bureaus from 1992 to 1997. From 1997 to 1999, she reported on the European Monetary Union from the London bureau. From 1999 to 2002, she was a reporter focusing on international economics; then assistant Washington bureau chief from 2002 to 2004.

In 2000, she and colleague Bob Davis won the Raymond Clapper Memorial Award for their Washington reporting.

In 2008, she published a memoir, The House at Sugar Beach (Simon & Schuster), about the Liberian coup of 1980 and its effect on the Coopers, who were socially and politically elite descendants of the free people of color from the United States who colonized Liberia in the 19th century. The book received critical acclaim and was a National Books Critics Circle Award finalist in 2008 for autobiography. The Washington Post called the book "a brilliant spotlight on a land too long forgotten".

She is the author of the book Madame President, about Liberia's first female president.

== Personal life ==
Cooper was born in Monrovia, Liberia, and studied journalism at the University of North Carolina at Chapel Hill, graduating with a B.A. in 1987. Her ancestors include two early settlers of Liberia, Elijah Johnson and Randolph Cooper. Her paternal grandfather was John Lewis Cooper, a Liberian telecommunications businessman and government minister.

In a piece about her reaction to the Trump Administration's freeze on Muslim refugees, Cooper recounted her own experience as a 13-year-old refugee leaving Liberia. Her father was shot (but survived), her cousin was executed, and her mother agreed to be gang-raped by soldiers to protect her and her sisters. They came to the U.S. on a tourist visa, which they overstayed until Ronald Reagan's amnesty gave them green cards. When she read an account of an Iranian family being taken off a plane, she remembered how her family was waiting for the takeoff in Liberia, praying that no one would take them off.

Helene Cooper is first cousins with Wilmot Collins, the current mayor of Helena, Montana. He is known for being the first black person to be elected as mayor of a Montanan town or city (after its statehood in November 1889).

== Bibliography ==
- Madame President, New York: Simon & Schuster, 2018, ISBN 9781451697360.
- The House at Sugar Beach, New York: Simon & Schuster, 2008, ISBN 0-7432-6624-2.
- Editor of Pearl, Daniel At Home in the World. New York:The Free Press, 2002, ISBN 0-7432-4317-X.
