= Norimitsu Onishi =

Japanese Canadian journalist

- Born: Ichikawa, Chiba Prefecture, Japan
- Occupation: Journalist
- Notable credit(s): The New York Times, The Detroit Free Press

Norimitsu Onishi (大西 哲光, Ōnishi Norimitsu) is a Japanese Canadian journalist. He is a Paris correspondent for the New York Times, after holding the position as Bureau Chief in Johannesburg, Jakarta, Tokyo and Abidjan.

He was a member of The New York Times reporting team that received the 2015 Pulitzer Prize for International Reporting for coverage of the 2014 Ebola virus epidemic in West Africa. Team members named by The Times were Pam Belluck, Helene Cooper, Sheri Fink, Adam Nossiter, Onishi, Kevin Sack, and Ben C. Solomon.

In November 2018, Onishi wrote an article about the lonely deaths of the elderly in Japan, titled "A Generation in Japan Faces a Lonely Death" for which he was nominated as a 2018 Pulitzer Prize for Feature Writing finalist. Readers thanked Norimitsu for his "profoundly moving piece" about two people who live alone in a danchi, a sprawling government apartment complex, outside Tokyo.

== Career ==
Onishi was born in Ichikawa, Chiba Prefecture, Japan. When he was four years old, Onishi and his family immigrated to Montreal, Quebec, Canada, where he attended Collège Jean-de-Brébeuf. He attended Princeton University and served as the chief editor of the student newspaper.

Onishi was a reporter for The Detroit Free Press from 1992 until 1993. In December 1993, he joined The New York Times where he began as police reporter from January to July 1994 and city weekly reporter from July 1994 to March 1995. He went on to become the Queens bureau chief from March 1995 to September 1997 and later the West Africa bureau chief from 1998 to 2002.

Onishi became the Tokyo bureau chief for the Times in August 2003, succeeding James Brooke. In 2008, he was transferred to head the Southeast Asia bureau in Jakarta; Martin Fackler succeeded him as chief of the Tokyo bureau. In 2012, he was part of a team of reporters, which also included Fackler and Hiroko Tabuchi, that was named as finalist for the Pulitzer Prize in International Reporting for its investigative coverage of the March 2011 Fukushima Daiichi nuclear disaster.

While reporting in West Africa, Onishi is credited with coining the word Nollywood as the now accepted nomenclature for what was at the time known locally as Nigeria’s “home-video film industry". In September and October 2014, Onishi reported on the ebola virus epidemic in West Africa from Liberia.

Since July 2019, he is a Paris correspondent.

Onishi received the 2020 Gerald Loeb Award for Breaking News for "Crash in Ethiopia".

== Criticism ==
Onishi has accused various Japanese politicians of historical revisionism, particularly on the topics of the Nanjing Massacre and comfort women. Conservatives in Japan such as Kohyu Nishimura and Yoshihisa Komori accuse Onishi of holding a leftist perspective and having a strong "anti-Japan" bias, which, they suggest, helps foster vilification of Japan abroad. This is partially due to Onishi's criticisms of Japan's most influential far-right organisation and lobby, Nippon Kaigi, which has members including prominent Japanese politicians and former prime ministers.

Another article, "Letter from Asia: Why Japan Seems Content to Be Run by One Party" provoked an official objection statement from the Ministry of Foreign Affairs of Japan for being "an incorrect article." In it, Onishi referred to Japan's democracy as an "illusion" and immature, comparing its government to that of North Korea and China.

His article on December 17, 2006, "Japan Rightists Fan Fury Over North Korea Abductions," was also criticized by Kyoko Nakayama, Special Adviser to the Japanese Prime Minister on Abduction. Thomas H. Snitch, a former professor of American University also suggested that Onishi's coverage on Japan's effort to deal with the issue of the North Korean abductions of Japanese is influenced by political bias. Some Japanese conservatives even made unproven claims that Onishi is a naturalized Japanese citizen of Korean descent.
