= Ben Solomon =

Ben Solomon may refer to:

- Ben C. Solomon (born 1987), American filmmaker and journalist
- Ben Zion Solomon, American-born Israeli musician
- Isaac Israeli ben Solomon (c.832–932), Arab Jewish physician and philosopher
- Joseph ben Solomon of Carcassonne (11th century), Jewish poet
