= Five Days at Memorial (miniseries) =

2022 television series

- Promotional poster
- Genre: Disaster medical drama
- Based on: Five Days at Memorial: Life and Death in a Storm-Ravaged Hospital by Sheri Fink
- Developed by: John Ridley; Carlton Cuse
- Starring: Vera Farmiga; Cherry Jones; Cornelius Smith Jr.; Robert Pine; Adepero Oduye; Julie Ann Emery; Michael Gaston; Molly Hager
- Music by: Torin Borrowdale
- Country of origin: United States
- Original language: English
- No. of episodes: 8

Production
- Executive producers: John Ridley; Carlton Cuse
- Producer: Sheri Fink
- Running time: 39–52 minutes
- Production companies: Genre Arts; International Famous Players Radio Pictures Corporation; ABC Signature

Original release
- Network: Apple TV+
- Release: August 12 – September 16, 2022

Five Days at Memorial is an American disaster medical drama television miniseries based on the 2013 book of the same name by Sheri Fink. It was developed, written and directed by John Ridley and Carlton Cuse. The miniseries premiered on August 12, 2022 on Apple TV+.

== Premise ==
The series depicts the difficulties at a New Orleans hospital after Hurricane Katrina makes landfall on the city.

== Cast and characters ==
=== Main ===
- Vera Farmiga as Dr. Anna Pou
- Cherry Jones as Susan Mulderick
- Cornelius Smith Jr. as Dr. Bryant King
- Robert Pine as Dr. Horace Baltz
- Adepero Oduye as Karen Wynn
- Julie Ann Emery as Diane Robichaux
- Michael Gaston as Arthur "Butch" Schafer
- Molly Hager as Virginia Rider

=== Recurring ===
- W. Earl Brown as Ewing Cook
- Stephen Bogaert as René Goux
- Darrin Baker as Dr. Martin Bisley
- Ted Atherton as Richard Deichmann
- Tammy Isbell as Gina Isbell
- Katie Boland as Kristy Johnson
- Deborah Hay as Therese Mendez
- Sarah Allen as Lori Budo
- Sharron Matthews as Cheri Landry
- Jessica Greco as Sandra Cordray
- Joel Keller as Eric Yancovich
- Jonathan Cake as Vince Pou
- Jeffrey Nordling as Richard T. Simmons, Jr.
- Damon Standifer as Emmett Everett
- Lanette Ware as Carrie Everett
- J. D. Evermore as Mark LeBlanc
- Monica Wyche as Sandra LeBlanc
- Dawn Greenhalgh as Elvira 'Vera' LeBlanc
- Joy Tanner as Jill
- Raven Dauda as Angela McManus
- Diane Johnstone as Wilda McManus
- Beth Malone as Linda Schafer
- Joe Carroll as Michael Arvin
- Paulino Nunes as Steven Jones
- Alexandra Castillo as Marcia Tellez
- Jeremiah Oh as Ken Nakamaru
- Ryan Allen as Drew Charles
- Tre Smith as Troye
- Jessica B. Hill as Kathleen Fournier
- Ma-Anne Dionisio as Jane DiMaapi
- Malube Uhindu-Gingala as Tarika Hill
- Nola Augustson as Minnie Cook
- Lorna Wilson as Mrs. Mulderick

=== Guest ===
- John Diehl as Frank Minyard
- Tom Irwin as Walker Shaw
- Ervin Ross as Rodney Scott
- Natasha Mumba as Tiana Colburn
- Philip Craig as Attorney General Charles Foti, Jr.
- Ean Castellanos as Michael Morales

== Episodes ==
No.	Title	Directed by	Written by	Original release date
1	"Day One"	John Ridley	John Ridley	August 12, 2022
Hurricane Katrina makes landfall in New Orleans. At Memorial Hospital, the doctors, nurses, and staff tend to patients and brace for the storm. A bridge going from one side of the hospital to the other looks like it might collapse, so Susan Mulderick orders Dr. Anna Pou to evacuate her team to the other side of the hospital.
2	"Day Two"	Carlton Cuse	John Ridley	August 12, 2022
While there is damage to Memorial Hospital, it is relatively minor, and the staff and patients think they've made it through the worst. Dr. Pou's husband wants her to go back home with him, but she refuses to leave the hospital because the situation is still an emergency. Soon after he departs, she learns the levees surrounding New Orleans are starting to break, and the waters are rising. She is distressed when she cannot reach him.
3	"Day Three"	Carlton Cuse	John Ridley	August 12, 2022
As the city floods, the hospital loses power. Susan Mulderick and the staff attempt to cope with the terrible conditions and prepare for an evacuation. Michael Arvin from corporate in Dallas is trying to help Memorial, but his superiors are seemingly uninterested. Mark and Sandra LeBlanc are trying to get back into New Orleans to help Mark's Mom, who is at Memorial.
4	"Day Four"	John Ridley	John Ridley	August 19, 2022
Conditions continue to deteriorate. After Dr. Pou gets upset while caring for a patient, Dr. Horace Baltz advises her to take a rest. An official from the Department of Health arrives and tells Susan Mulderick that there will be rescue boats for them next morning. He also tells them to use colored armbands on patients to prioritize who should be rescued. As it gets dark, the Coast Guard wants to continue the helicopter evacuation, but Mulderick says it is too dangerous and shuts down the rescues for the night. A false rumor spreads in the middle of the night that boats are arriving.
5	"Day Five"	John Ridley	John Ridley	August 26, 2022
Mark and Sandra LeBlanc reach Memorial by boat and rescue Mark's mom. The decision is made to euthanize all pets, as they will not be considered for evacuation. Law enforcement officers arrive with boats and tell staff they need to get everyone out by five p.m. Susan Mulderick says no living patient will be left behind and advises Dr. Pou to speak with Dr. Cook about making patients comfortable.
6	"45 Dead"	Wendey Stanzler	Carlton Cuse	September 2, 2022
Butch Schafer and Virginia Rider work for the state of Louisiana to determine what happened to the 45 people found dead at Memorial in the aftermath of Katrina. During their investigation, they speak to a number of staff members who believe that Dr. Pou gave some patients lethal doses of drugs to end their lives. Pou is offered a job at LSU, which she accepts. A CNN producer calls Pou to ask for the medical professionals' side of the story. Pou speaks with a Tenet attorney, who says she works for the company, not individual doctors. The lawyer advises Pou to hire her own counsel, which she does.
7	"Nobody Knows the Trouble I've Seen"	Wendey Stanzler	Carlton Cuse	September 9, 2022
Due to the publicity about the investigation into Dr. Pou's alleged actions at Memorial after Katrina, she agrees to stop performing surgery. Toxicology results from eighteen of the dead patients show that nine tested positive for one or both of the drugs the pharmacist said he provided to Pou. One witness returns to tell Schafer and Rider that she saw Pou injecting several LifeCare patients and went with her to the door of Emmett Everett's room. Everett's wife asks Rider not to let powerful people make the investigation go away. Rider, confident in the case, comes to Pou's house and arrests her for the murder of four of the patients.
8	"The Reckoning"	Wendey Stanzler	Carlton Cuse	September 16, 2022
Renowned forensic experts conclude that multiple patient deaths were homicides, but prosecutors with the Orleans Parish District Attorney's office - which now has jurisdiction in the case against Dr. Pou - are less enthusiastic than Schafer and Rider. Pou's lawyer convinces her to appear on 60 Minutes, where she comes across as sympathetic and credible, leading the coroner, Dr. Frank Minyard, to ask to meet with her. Minyard reveals he was close with her father, who helped him start his practice. The Orleans Parish grand jury declines to indict Pou, but key witnesses and experts were never called. Pou gives a lecture, and Dr. Baltz confronts her about her version of events at Memorial.

== Production ==
=== Development ===
In 2013, shortly after its release, Scott Rudin acquired the rights to adapt Five Days at Memorial: Life and Death in a Storm-Ravaged Hospital as a film to be produced with Eli Bush under Scott Rudin Productions. By 2017, the film rights had reportedly lapsed, prompting Ryan Murphy to approach Rudin about adapting Five Days at Memorial for television as the third season of the FX true crime anthology series American Crime Story, with Sarah Paulson set to star as Dr. Anna Pou. The adaptation, however, never came to fruition, and in 2019, Rudin started shopping the project elsewhere. As part of his overall deal with ABC Signature, Carlton Cuse acquired the television rights, and then contacted John Ridley to collaborate. In September 2020, Apple ordered Five Days at Memorial as a limited series to be produced for Apple TV+. Both Cuse and Ridley serve as writers, directors, executive producers, and co-showrunners of the series.

=== Casting ===
Vera Farmiga was cast in March 2021, with Adepero Oduye, Cornelius Smith Jr. and Julie Ann Emery joining in April 2021, Cherry Jones and Molly Hager in May 2021, Michael Gaston in June 2021, and Joe Carroll in August 2021.

=== Filming ===
Production took place from May 25 to November 10, 2021, in Toronto and New Orleans.

== Release ==
The series premiered on Apple TV+ on August 12, 2022, with its first three episodes. Each following episode was released weekly on Fridays.

== Reception ==
=== Critical response ===
The review aggregator website Rotten Tomatoes reports an 86% approval rating with an average rating of 7.9/10, based on 35 critic reviews. The website's critics consensus reads, "Five Days at Memorial is unflinching to the point of punishing, thoroughly recounting an absolute calamity while giving due to those who tried their best to stanch the tragic fallout." Metacritic, which uses a weighted average, assigned a score of 74 out of 100 based on 19 critics, indicating "generally favorable reviews".

=== Accolades ===
The episode "Day Two" won the award for Outstanding Special Visual Effects in a Single Episode at the 75th Primetime Creative Arts Emmy Awards. The show also won Outstanding Supporting Visual Effects in a Photoreal Episode at the 21st Visual Effects Society Awards.
