= List of awards and nominations received by Regina King =

Regina King awards and nominations
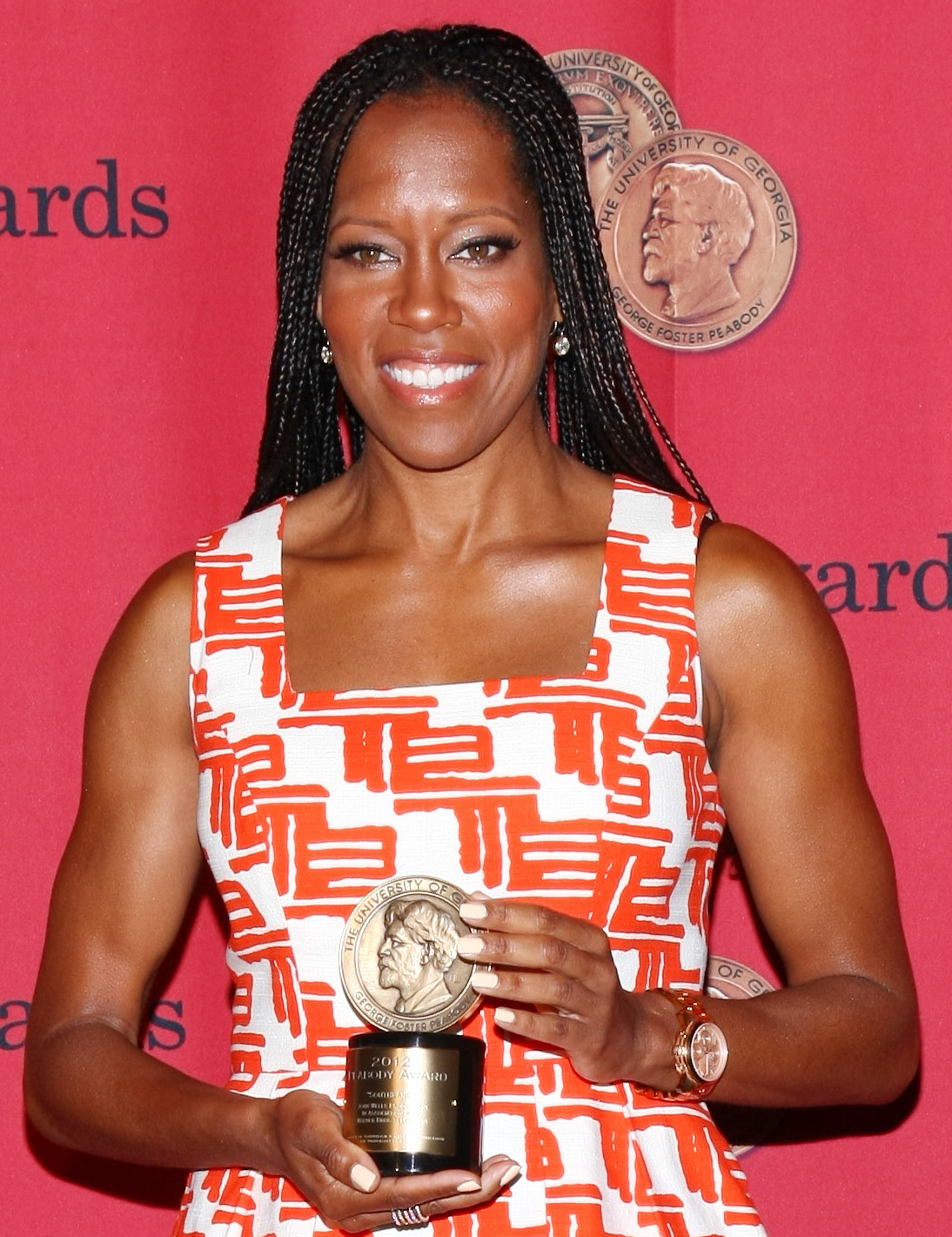
- King at the 72nd Peabody Awards in 2013
Awards and nominations
Award	Wins	Nominations
Academy Awards	1	1
BET Awards	3	8
Black Reel Awards	7	12
Critics' Choice Movie Awards	1	4
Critics' Choice Television Awards	2	5
Critics' Choice Super Awards	0	1
Golden Globe Awards	1	4
NAACP Image Awards	7	17
Primetime Emmy Awards	4	5
Satellite Awards	3	4
Saturn Awards	0	1
Screen Actors Guild Awards	0	1

Totals (Note: Certain award groups do not simply award one winner. They acknowledge several different recipients, have runners-up, and have third place. Since this is a specific recognition and is different from losing an award, runner-up mentions are considered wins in this award tally. For simplification and to avoid errors, each award in this list has been presumed to have had a prior nomination.)
- Wins: 65
- Nominations: 122

This is a list of awards and nominations received by American actress and director Regina King.

In the early 2000s, Regina King began acting as a supporting actress in the films Ray, Miss Congeniality 2: Armed and Fabulous and Down to Earth. Since the 2010s she has received critical acclaim for her roles in the television series Southland, receiving multiple Critics' Choice Television Award nominations and winning two NAACP Image Awards, and American Crime, which garnered her two Primetime Emmy Awards and her first Golden Globe nomination.

In 2018, she took part in the film If Beale Street Could Talk, thanks to which she won critical acclaim from film critics, being recognized with her first Academy Award, Golden Globe and Critics' Choice Movie Award for Best Supporting Actress. Between 2018 and 2019 she starred in the television series Seven Seconds and Watchmen, which each earned her a Primetime Emmy Award for Outstanding Lead Actress in a Limited Series or Movie and the TCA Award for Individual Achievement in Drama.

In 2020, Regina King debuted as film director with One Night in Miami..., which receiving critical support, with nominations at the Golden Globe and Critics' Choice Movie Awards in the categories of Best Director.

== Major associations ==
=== Academy Awards ===
Year	Category	Work	Result	Ref.
2019	Best Supporting Actress	If Beale Street Could Talk	Won	

=== Directors Guild Awards ===
Year	Category	Work	Result	Ref.
2020	Outstanding Directing – First-Time Feature Film	One Night in Miami...	Nominated	

=== Golden Globe Awards ===
Year	Category	Work	Result	Ref.
2016	Best Supporting Actress – Television	American Crime	Nominated	
2019	Best Actress in a Miniseries or Motion Picture – Television	Seven Seconds	Nominated	
2019	Best Supporting Actress – Motion Picture	If Beale Street Could Talk	Won	
2021	Best Director	One Night in Miami...	Nominated	

=== Primetime Emmy Awards ===
Year	Category	Work	Result	Ref.
2015	Outstanding Supporting Actress in a Limited Series or Movie	American Crime	Won	
2016	Outstanding Supporting Actress in a Limited Series or Movie	American Crime	Won	
2017	Outstanding Supporting Actress in a Limited Series or Movie	American Crime	Nominated	
2018	Outstanding Lead Actress in a Limited Series or Movie	Seven Seconds	Won	
2020	Outstanding Lead Actress in a Limited Series or Movie	Watchmen	Won	

=== Screen Actors Guild Awards ===
Year	Category	Work	Result	Ref.
2005	Outstanding Ensemble in a Motion Picture	Ray	Nominated	

== Other awards and nominations ==
=== BET Awards ===
Year	Category	Work	Result	Ref.
2001	Best Actress in a Film	Down to Earth	Nominated	
2005	Best Actress in a Film	A Cinderella Story	Won	
2005	Best Actress in a Film	Miss Congeniality 2: Armed and Fabulous	Won	
2005	Best Actress in a Film	Ray	Won	
2010	Best Actress on Television	Southland	Nominated	
2011	Best Actress on Television	Southland	Nominated	
2012	Best Actress on Television	Southland	Nominated	
2019	Best Actress	If Beale Street Could Talk	Won	
2020	Best Actress	Watchmen	Nominated	
2024	Best Actress	Shirley	Won	

=== Black Reel Awards ===
Year	Category	Work	Result	Ref.
2005	Best Actress, Drama	Ray	Nominated	
2016	Best Supporting Actress in a TV Movie or Limited Series	American Crime	Won	
2016	Outstanding Director in a Television Miniseries or Movie	Let the Church Say Amen	Nominated	
2017	Best Supporting Actress in a TV Movie or Limited Series	American Crime	Won	
2019	Best Supporting Actress	If Beale Street Could Talk	Won	
2020	Outstanding Actress, TV Movie/Limited Series	Watchmen	Won	
2021	Outstanding Director	One Night in Miami...	Won	
2021	Outstanding Emerging Director	One Night in Miami...	Won	
2022	Outstanding Supporting Actress	The Harder They Fall	Nominated	
2024	Outstanding Directing in a TV Movie or Limited Series	A Man in Full	Nominated	
2025	Outstanding Lead Performance	Shirley	Nominated	
2025	Outstanding Directing in a Drama Series	Forever	Won	

=== Critics' Choice Movie Awards ===
Year	Category	Work	Result	Ref.
2019	Best Supporting Actress	If Beale Street Could Talk	Won	
2021	Best Picture	One Night in Miami...	Nominated	
2021	Best Director	One Night in Miami...	Nominated	
2022	Best Acting Ensemble	The Harder They Fall	Nominated	

=== Critics' Choice Super Awards ===
Year	Category	Work	Result	Ref.
2022	Best Actress in an Action Movie	The Harder They Fall	Nominated	

=== Critics' Choice Television Awards ===
Year	Category	Work	Result	Ref.
2012	Best Supporting Actress in a Drama Series	Southland	Nominated	
2013	Best Supporting Actress in a Drama Series	Southland	Nominated	
2016	Best Supporting Actress in a Drama Series	The Leftovers	Nominated	
2016	Best Supporting Actress in a Movie/Limited Series	American Crime	Won	
2019	Best Actress in a Drama Series	Watchmen	Won	

=== Gotham Awards ===
Year	Category	Work	Result	Ref.
2021	Ensemble Tribute Award	The Harder They Fall	Won	

=== Independent Spirit Awards ===
Year	Category	Work	Result	Ref.
2019	Best Supporting Female	If Beale Street Could Talk	Won	
2021	Robert Altman Award	One Night in Miami...	Won	

=== NAACP Image Awards ===
Year	Category	Work	Result	Ref.
1999	Outstanding Actress in a Motion Picture	Enemy of the State	Nominated	
2002	Outstanding Actress in a Motion Picture	Down to Earth	Nominated	
2005	Outstanding Supporting Actress in a Motion Picture	Ray	Won	
2010	Outstanding Actress in a Drama Series	Southland	Nominated	
2011	Outstanding Actress in a Drama Series	Southland	Won	
2012	Outstanding Actress in a Drama Series	Southland	Won	
2013	Outstanding Actress in a Drama Series	Southland	Nominated	
2014	Outstanding Actress in a Drama Series	Southland	Nominated	
2016	Outstanding Supporting Actress in a Drama Series	American Crime	Won	
2018	Outstanding Supporting Actress in a Motion Picture	If Beale Street Could Talk	Nominated	
2018	Outstanding Actress in a Television Movie, Mini-Series or Dramatic Special	Seven Seconds	Won	
2018	Entertainer of the Year	Herself	Nominated	
2021	Outstanding Directing in a Motion Picture	One Night in Miami...	Nominated	
2022	Outstanding Supporting Actress in a Motion Picture	The Harder They Fall	Won	
2022	Outstanding Ensemble Cast in a Motion Picture	The Harder They Fall	Won	
2022	Entertainer of the Year	Herself	Nominated	
2025	Outstanding Actress in a Motion Picture	Shirley	Nominated	

=== National Board of Review ===
Year	Category	Work	Result	Ref.
2018	Best Supporting Actress	If Beale Street Could Talk	Won	
2021	Best Cast	The Harder They Fall	Won	

=== National Society of Film Critics ===
Year	Category	Work	Result	Ref.
2019	Best Supporting Actress	If Beale Street Could Talk	Won	

=== Peabody Awards ===
Year	Category	Work	Result	Ref.
2011		Southland	Won	
2020	Entertainment Award	Watchmen	Won	

=== Satellite Awards ===
Year	Category	Work	Result	Ref.
2005	Best Supporting Actress – Motion Picture	Ray	Won	
2016	Best Cast – Television Series	American Crime	Won	
2016	Best Supporting Actress – Series, Miniseries or Television Film	American Crime	Nominated	
2019	Best Supporting Actress – Motion Picture	If Beale Street Could Talk	Won	

=== Saturn Awards ===
Year	Category	Work	Result	Ref.
2021	Best Actress on Television	Watchmen	Nominated	

=== Teen Choice Awards ===
Year	Category	Work	Result	Ref.
2005	Choice Movie Dance Scene (shared with Sandra Bullock)	Miss Congeniality 2: Armed and Fabulous	Nominated	

== Critics awards ==
Critics' Awards
Year	Work	Category	Result	Ref.
African-American Film Critics Association Awards
2018	If Beale Street Could Talk	Best Supporting Actress	Won	
2021	The Harder They Fall	Best Ensemble	Won	
Alliance of Women Film Journalists
2021	One Night In Miami...	Best Director	Won	
2021	One Night In Miami...	Best Woman Director	Won	
Austin Film Critics Association Awards
2019	If Beale Street Could Talk	Best Supporting Actress	Won	
2022	The Harder They Fall	Best Ensemble	Nominated	
Black Film Critics Circle Awards
2018	If Beale Street Could Talk	Best Supporting Actress	Won	
2021	One Night in Miami...	Best Director	Won	
Boston Society of Film Critics Awards
2018	If Beale Street Could Talk	Best Supporting Actress	Won	
Celebration of Black Cinema and Television
2024	Herself	Trailblazer Award	Won	
Chicago Film Critics Awards
2018	If Beale Street Could Talk	Best Supporting Actress	Nominated	
Detroit Film Critics Society
2018	If Beale Street Could Talk	Best Supporting Actress	Won	
2021	One Night in Miami...	Best Director	Nominated	
2022	The Harder They Fall	Best Ensemble	Nominated	
Dorian Awards
2018	If Beale Street Could Talk	Supporting Actress of the Year	Won	
2021	One Night in Miami...	Best Director	Nominated	
2021	Herself	Wilde Artist Award	Nominated	
Florida Film Critics Circle Awards
2018	If Beale Street Could Talk	Best Supporting Actress	Nominated	
Georgia Film Critics Association
2019	If Beale Street Could Talk	Best Supporting Actress	Nominated	
Hawaii Film Critics Society
2021	One Night in Miami...	Best New Filmmaker	Won	
2021	One Night in Miami...	Best First Film	Nominated	
Hollywood Critics Association
2021	One Night in Miami...	Best Female Director	Nominated	
2022	The Harder They Fall	Best Cast Ensemble	Nominated	
Houston Film Critics Society
2019	If Beale Street Could Talk	Best Supporting Actress	Nominated	
2021	One Night in Miami...	Best Director	Nominated	
Indiana Film Journalists Association
2021	One Night in Miami...	Best Director	Nominated	
Las Vegas Film Critics Society Awards
2018	If Beale Street Could Talk	Best Supporting Actress	Won	
London Film Critics' Circle
2019	If Beale Street Could Talk	Supporting Actress of the Year	Nominated	
Los Angeles Film Critics Association
2018	If Beale Street Could Talk	Best Supporting Actress	Won	
New York Film Critics Online Awards
2019	If Beale Street Could Talk	Best Supporting Actress	Won	
North Carolina Film Critics Association
2019	If Beale Street Could Talk	Best Supporting Actress	Won	
2021	One Night in Miami...	Best Director	Nominated	
Oklahoma Film Critics Circle Awards
2018	If Beale Street Could Talk	Best Supporting Actress	Won	
Online Film & Television Association Awards
2013	The Big Bang Theory	Best Guest Actress in a Comedy Series	Nominated	
2016	American Crime	Best Supporting Actress in a Motion Picture or Limited Series	Nominated	
2017	American Crime	Best Supporting Actress in a Motion Picture or Limited Series	Nominated	
2018	Seven Seconds	Best Actress in a Motion Picture or Limited Series	Nominated	
2019	If Beale Street Could Talk	Best Supporting Actress	Won	
2020	Watchmen	Best Actress in a Motion Picture or Limited Series	Won	
2021	One Night in Miami...	Best Directorial Debut	Nominated	
Palm Springs International Film Festival
2019	If Beale Street Could Talk	Chairman's Award	Won	
Philadelphia Film Critics Circle Awards
2018	If Beale Street Could Talk	Best Supporting Actress	Won	
2021	One Night in Miami...	Best Directorial Debut	Won	
San Diego Film Critics Society
2021	The Harder They Fall	Best Ensemble	Nominated	
San Francisco Bay Area Film Critics Circle
2018	If Beale Street Could Talk	Best Supporting Actress	Won	
Seattle Film Critics Society
2019	If Beale Street Could Talk	Best Supporting Actress	Won	
St. Louis Film Critics Association
2018	If Beale Street Could Talk	Best Supporting Actress	Won	
TCA Awards
2020	Watchmen	Individual Achievement in Drama	Won	
Toronto Film Critics Association
2018	If Beale Street Could Talk	Best Supporting Actress	Won	
Toronto International Film Festival
2020	One Night in Miami...	Best Director - People Choice Award	Nominated	
Utah Film Critics Award
2020	One Night in Miami...	Best Director	Won	
Washington D.C. Area Film Critics Association Awards
2016	If Beale Street Could Talk	Best Supporting Actress	Won	
2016	If Beale Street Could Talk	Best Acting Ensemble	Nominated	
2021	The Harder They Fall	Best Acting Ensemble	Nominated	
