= Regina King =

American actress and director (born 1971)

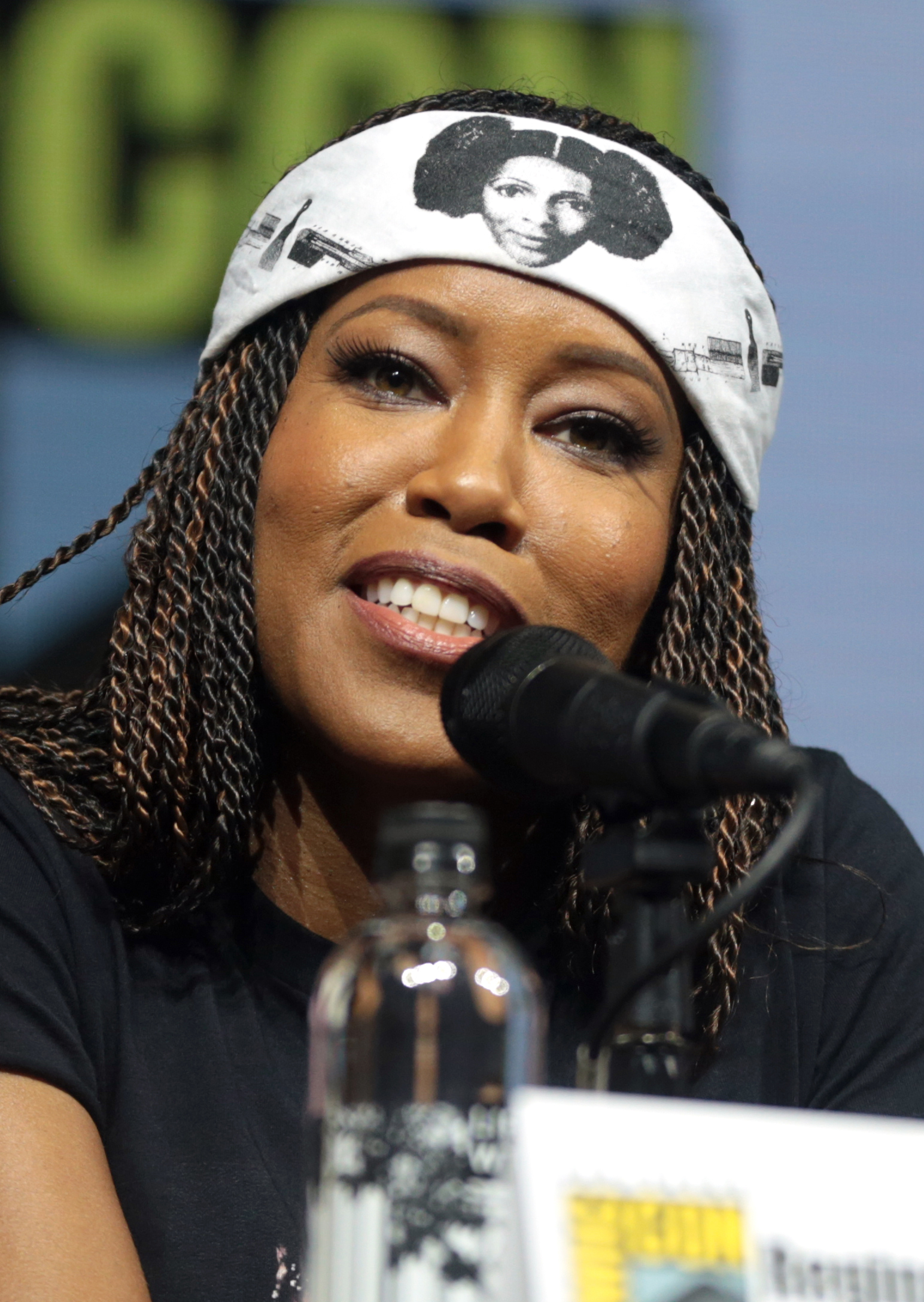
- King in 2018
- Born: Regina Rene King; January 15, 1971 (age 55); Los Angeles, California, U.S.
- Occupations: Actress; director; producer
- Years active: 1985–present
- Spouse: Ian Alexander Sr. (m. 1997; div. 2007)
- Children: 1
- Awards: Full list

Regina Rene King (born January 15, 1971) is an American actress, director and producer. She has received various accolades, including an Academy Award, a Golden Globe Award, and four Primetime Emmy Awards. In 2019, Time magazine named her one of the 100 most influential people in the world.

King first gained attention for starring in the television sitcom 227 (1985–1990). Her subsequent roles included the film Friday (1995), the animated series The Boondocks (2005–2014), and the crime television series Southland (2009–2013). She received four Primetime Emmy Awards for her performances in the ABC anthology series American Crime (2015–2017), the Netflix miniseries Seven Seconds (2018), and the HBO limited series Watchmen (2019). Her other television roles include the drama series The Leftovers (2015–2017) and the sitcom The Big Bang Theory (2013–2019).

King has also played supporting roles in the drama films Boyz n the Hood (1991), Poetic Justice (1993), How Stella Got Her Groove Back (1998), and Ray (2004), and the comedies Down to Earth (2001), Legally Blonde 2: Red, White & Blonde (2003), A Cinderella Story (2004), and Miss Congeniality 2: Armed & Fabulous (2005). She earned critical acclaim, as well as the Academy Award for Best Supporting Actress, for her role in If Beale Street Could Talk (2018). She then starred in the western The Harder They Fall (2021), played the title role in the biopic Shirley (2024) and played Detective Roman in crime thriller Caught Stealing (2025).

King has directed episodes for several television shows, including Scandal and This Is Us. She has also directed the music video for the 2010 song "Finding My Way Back" by Jaheim. King's feature film directorial debut came with the drama One Night in Miami... (2020), which earned her a nomination for the Golden Globe Award for Best Director.

== Early life and education ==
Regina Rene King was born on January 15, 1971, in Los Angeles, California, and grew up in View Park–Windsor Hills. King's ancestors were part of the transatlantic slave trade; they originated from Liberia, Senegal, and Sierra Leone. Both of her parents are from the Southern United States, and they later moved to Los Angeles during the Great Migration. Her mother, Gloria Jean (née Cain), was a special education teacher, and her father, Thomas Henry King Jr., was an electrician. She has a younger sister, Reina, who co-starred with her in the Shirley Chisholm Netflix biographical film Shirley. King first started in dance classes training in ballet and jazz before starting to tag along with her sister to acting classes. She soon began studying acting under her acting coach Betty Bridges. Her parents divorced when she was eight years old. King attended Westchester High School, graduating in 1989. She later studied communications at the University of Southern California for two years before pursuing her passion for acting.

== Career ==
=== 1985–2004: Early roles and breakthrough ===
King began her acting career in 1985, as Brenda Jenkins on the television series 227, a role she played until the show ended in 1990. Her performance during the five-season run of the show was well-received and earned King two Young Artist Award nominations: one for Best Actress Starring in a New Television Series in 1986 and one for Exceptional Performance by a Young Actress in a Long Running Series Comedy or Drama in 1987. She went on to appear in the John Singleton films Boyz n the Hood, Poetic Justice, and Higher Learning. In 1995, she was featured in the hit comedy film Friday. The next year, she starred in the Martin Lawrence dark comedy-romance A Thin Line Between Love and Hate as Mia, and she gained fame starring in blockbuster romantic comedy film Jerry Maguire as Marcee Tidwell.

In 1998, she was cast in Tony Scott's film Enemy of the State, receiving her first nomination at the NAACP Image Awards for Outstanding Actress in a Motion Picture. In the same year, King took part in the films How Stella Got Her Groove Back, Mighty Joe Young, and Love and Action in Chicago. In 2001, King played Sontee Jenkins in Chris and Paul Weitz's Down to Earth, receiving praise from critics for her performance. The following year, she played the main role in television series Leap of Faith.

After taking part in teen romantic comedy film A Cinderella Story, King was cast as Margie Hendrix in the Academy Awards nominated biographical film Ray, about Ray Charles. For her performance in Ray, King won the Satellite Award for Best Supporting Actress, the NAACP Image Award for Outstanding Supporting Actress and was part of a cast nomination from the Screen Actors Guild Awards.

=== 2005–2017: Established actress ===
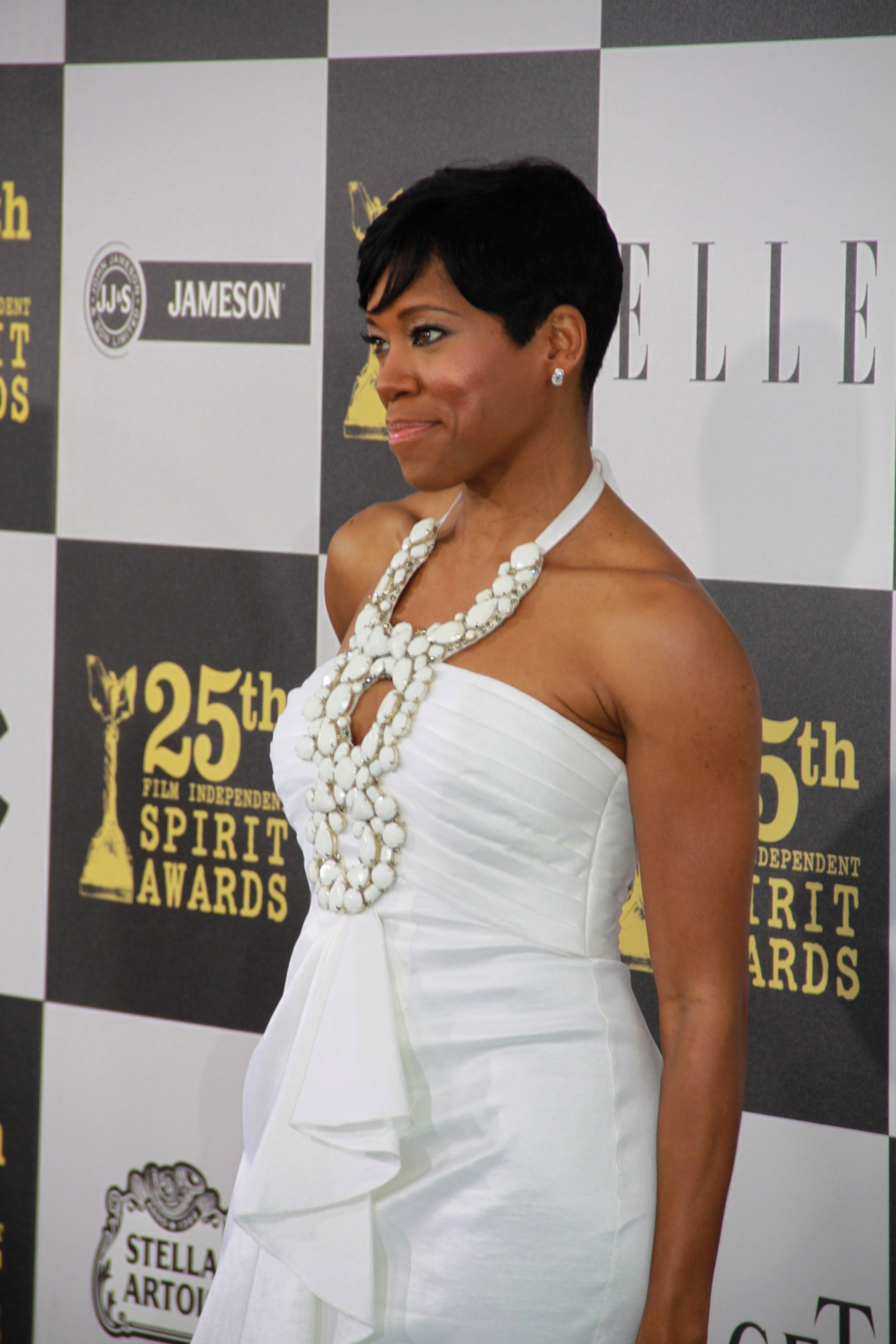
Regina King at the Independent Spirit Awards in 2010

In 2005, King was cast in Miss Congeniality 2: Armed and Fabulous and began voicing the characters Huey and Riley Freeman for the animated series The Boondocks. In 2007, King played the main role of Sandra Palmer in season six of television series 24 and acted in films Year of the Dog and This Christmas. From 2009 to 2013, King played Detective Lydia Adams in TNT police drama Southland, receiving multiple Critics' Choice Television Award nominations, and winning two NAACP Image Awards.

After taking part in Rick Famuyiwa's romantic comedy film Our Family Wedding, King appeared as guest judge in RuPaul's Drag Race. In 2013, King played Caltech HR manager Janine Davis in the television series The Big Bang Theory. In 2014, she was cast in two television series, The Strain and Shameless.

In 2015, King was a cast member on ABC's John Ridley-penned ensemble drama American Crime, playing three roles including a devout member of the Nation of Islam and the sister of a drug addict accused of murder. In 2015 and 2016, King won the Primetime Emmy Award for Outstanding Supporting Actress in a Limited Series or a Movie for her roles. Also in 2015, King starred in The Leftovers, which earned her a Peabody Award.

From 2015 to 2017, King began to pursue work as a director and writer, initially directing six episodes of the drama series Being Mary Jane. In 2016, she directed two episodes of Scandal, and single episodes of The Catch, Animal Kingdom, This Is Us and Shameless.

=== 2018–present: Awards success and directorial debut ===
In 2018, King played the mother of a murdered black teenager in the Netflix original series Seven Seconds, winning her third Primetime Emmy Award. Her performance in the 2018 film If Beale Street Could Talk, directed by Barry Jenkins, garnered critical acclaim and earned her the Golden Globe Award and Academy Award for Best Supporting Actress. King additionally won the Critics' Choice, Los Angeles Film Critics, New York Film Critics, National Society of Film Critics, and numerous other critic awards for Supporting Actress, making her the most awarded actor of 2018 in film. In regards to King's performance, Richard Roeper for the Chicago Sun-Times wrote: "Regina King is blazingly good in a nomination-worthy performance as Tish's mother. Even when there's fire in her eyes as she defends her daughter, you can see her primary motivating force is love. The love she has for her child, and for the child of her child." In his review for The Observer, Mark Kermode wrote: "As for Regina King, her brilliantly modulated performance is a masterclass in physical understatement. One moment stands out [...] 'Mamma... ,' says Tish, tentatively, and even before she turns to face us, an almost imperceptible movement of King's neck and shoulders tells us that Sharon knows exactly what her daughter is about to say."

Re-teaming with The Leftovers creator Damon Lindelof, King starred in the 2019 limited series Watchmen, for which she received acclaim and won the TCA Award for Individual Achievement in Drama, Critics' Choice Award for Best Actress in a Drama Series, and her fourth Primetime Emmy Award. In an IndieWire review for the series, Ben Travers wrote: "King is nothing short of amazing — yes, she's got an Oscar and three Emmys, but she puts even more range on display in a turn that effortlessly pivots between invulnerable and vulnerable." In a decade-end list by Caroline Framke and Daniel D'Addario for Variety, King's performance was amongst the best of the 2010s in television. In July 2019, it was announced King would direct One Night in Miami... based upon the play of the same name. In a CBS interview regarding the movie, King said taking on the project was daunting and "scary in a good way" and described the connection she felt to these characters saying, "I felt like I knew all of these men. I saw my son in these conversations. I saw my father in these conversations. They love, they're vulnerable, they're strong." When asked about her experience of directing in an interview with Rolling Stone, King says "I love being the person that the idea starts from. And then you give these thoughts to your department heads, and they get excited and take it even further, and then bring things to the table that you may not have thought about. It's really fun. I love doing puzzles. Hardcore. I'm a puzzler. And so maybe a bit of that spirit is what's exciting." The film had its world premiere at the Venice Film Festival on September 7, 2020, the first film directed by an African-American woman to be selected in the festival's history. King received numerous awards and nominations at major critics' prizes, earning a Best Director nomination at the Golden Globe Awards and being recognized with the Robert Altman Award at the Independent Spirit Awards.

In October 2021, King starred in Netflix's American Western film The Harder They Fall, directed by Jeymes Samuel, winning several awards including the NAACP Image Award for Outstanding Supporting Actress in a Motion Picture.

King next produced Netflix's Shirley, a biopic about the first black congresswoman Shirley Chisholm during her historic presidential campaign, and starred as the title character. It was written and directed by John Ridley, with whom she previously worked on American Crime. In May 2021, it was announced that King would direct race-themed monster movie Bitter Root for Legendary Entertainment. She served as an executive producer and directed the David E. Kelley–written television series A Man in Full for Netflix, based on the Tom Wolfe novel of the same name.

== Styles and themes ==
In her directorial projects, King has aimed to create movies about representation, advocacy for diversity and uplifting unseen storytellers. King has further cemented her passion in these themes onstage at the 2019 Golden Globes stating, "In the next two years, everything that I produce — I am making a vow and it's going to be tough — to make sure that everything I produce is 50% women."

== Personal life ==
King was married to Ian Alexander Sr. from 1997 to 2007. They had one son in 1996, Ian Alexander Jr., who worked as a disc jockey and recording artist before his suicide on January 21, 2022, at age 26. Since the death of her son, King has discussed the complexities of grief and loss as well as the importance of mental health awareness. When talking about mental health on Good Morning America, she said, "When it comes to depression, people expect it to look a certain way and they expect it to look heavy. And people expect that…to have to experience this and not be able to have the time to just sit with Ian's choice, which I respect and understand, you know, that he didn't wanna be here anymore, that's a hard thing for other people to receive because they did not live our experience, did not live Ian's journey."

== Filmography ==
=== Film ===
Year	Title	Role	Notes
1991	Boyz n the Hood	Shalika	
1993	Poetic Justice	Iesha	
1995	Higher Learning	Monet	
1995	Friday	Dana Jones	
1996	A Thin Line Between Love and Hate	Mia Williams	
1996	Jerry Maguire	Marcee Tidwell	
1998	Rituals	Iris	Short film
1998	How Stella Got Her Groove Back	Vanessa	
1998	Enemy of the State	Carla Dean	
1998	Mighty Joe Young	Cecily Banks	
1999	Love and Action in Chicago	Lois Newton	
2001	Down to Earth	Sontee Jenkins	
2002	Truth Be Told	Rayne	
2003	Daddy Day Care	Kim Hinton	
2003	Legally Blonde 2: Red, White & Blonde	Grace Rossiter	
2004	A Cinderella Story	Rhonda	
2004	Ray	Margie Hendrix	
2005	Miss Congeniality 2: Armed and Fabulous	Sam Fuller	
2006	The Ant Bully	Kreela	Voice
2007	Year of the Dog	Layla	
2007	This Christmas	Lisa Whitfield-Moore	
2010	Our Family Wedding	Angela	
2013	Inside the Box	Stephanie Miles	Short film
2014	Planes: Fire & Rescue	Dynamite	Voice
2018	If Beale Street Could Talk	Sharon Rivers	
2021	Flag Day	U.S. Marshall Blake	
2021	The Harder They Fall	Trudy Smith	
2024	Shirley	Shirley Chisholm	Also producer
2025	Caught Stealing	Detective Roman	
2027	Children of Blood and Bone †	Queen Nehanda	Post-production

=== Television ===
Year	Title	Role	Notes
1985–1990	227	Brenda Jenkins	Main role
1994	Northern Exposure	Mother Nature	Episode: "Baby Blues"
1994	New York Undercover	Marah	Episode: "Tasha"
1995	Living Single	Zina	Episode: "The Shake-Up"
1999	Where the Truth Lies	Lillian Rose-Martin	Television film
2000	If These Walls Could Talk 2	Allie	Television film
2002	Leap of Faith	Cynthia	Main role (season 1)
2002	Damaged Care	Cheryl Griffith	Television film
2005–2014	The Boondocks	Huey Freeman / Riley Freeman	Voice, main role
2006	Women in Law	—N/a	Pilot
2007	24	Sandra Palmer	Main role (season 6)
2008	Living Proof	Ellie Jackson	Television film
2009–2013	Southland	Detective Lydia Adams	Main role
2012	RuPaul's Drag Race	Herself (guest judge)	Episode: "Dragazines"
2013	Divorce: A Love Story	Cassandra	Television film
2013–2019	The Big Bang Theory	Janine Davis	6 episodes
2014	The Strain	Ruby Wain	3 episodes
2014	Shameless	Gail Johnson	4 episodes
2014	The Gabby Douglas Story	Natalie Hawkins	Television film
2015–2017	American Crime	Aliyah Shadeed	Recurring role (season 1)
2015–2017	American Crime	Terri LaCroix	Main role (season 2)
2015–2017	American Crime	Kimara Walters	Main role (season 3)
2015, 2017	The Leftovers	Erika Murphy	Main role (season 2), guest role (season 3)
2015	Pariah	Karen	Television film
2016	The Snowy Day	Mom	Voice;, Television special
2017	The Adventures of Hooligan Squad in World War III	Colonel Rah	Television film
2018	Seven Seconds	Latrice Butler	Main role
2019	Watchmen	Angela Abar / Sister Night	Main role
2021	Saturday Night Live	Herself (host)	Episode: "Regina King / Nathaniel Rateliff"
2022	Phat Tuesdays: The Era Of Hip Hop Comedy	Herself	Documentary series

=== As director ===
Year	Title	Notes
2013	Southland	Episode: "Off Duty"
2013	Let the Church Say Amen	Television film
2014	Story of a Village	Feature film
2015	Being Mary Jane	6 episodes
2015–2016	Scandal	2 episodes
2016	The Catch	Episode: "The Princess and the I.P."
2016	Animal Kingdom	Episode: "Child Care"
2016	Greenleaf	Episode: "Veni, Vidi, Vici"
2016	Pitch	Episode: "The Break"
2017	This Is Us	Episode: "The 20s"
2017	Shameless	Episode: "Fuck Paying It Forward"
2018	The Good Doctor	Episode: "Heartfelt"
2018	Insecure	Episode: "Ghost-Like"
2018	The Finest	Feature film
2020	One Night in Miami...	Feature film, also executive producer
2024	A Man in Full	3 episodes, also executive producer
2025	Forever	1 episode
Release date unknown	Bitter Root	Feature film

=== As music video director ===
Year	Song	Artist
2010	"Finding My Way Back"	Jaheim
2011	"Not My Daddy"	Kelly Price featuring Stokley

== Awards and nominations ==
- List of awards and nominations received by Regina King

== Works cited ==
- Explore the history of Regina King and their history by Independent Media Inc
- Regina King Reveals How Her Perspective Has Changed After Son's Death "I'm Thinking of Him 24/7" by Katherine Schaffstall
