= Kevin Sack =

American journalist

Kevin Sack, an American journalist, is a senior reporter for The New York Times.

Sack shared a Pulitzer Prize for National Reporting in 2001 for a New York Times series on race.

While at The Los Angeles Times, he received the 2003 Pulitzer Prize for National Reporting, with Alan Miller, for their revelatory and moving examination of a military aircraft, nicknamed "The Widow Maker," that was linked to the deaths of 45 pilots.

He was a member of The New York Times reporting team that received the 2015 Pulitzer Prize for International Reporting for coverage of the 2014 Ebola virus epidemic in West Africa. Team members named by The Times were Pam Belluck, Helene Cooper, Sheri Fink, Adam Nossiter, Norimitsu Onishi, Sack, and Ben C. Solomon.

Sack's book Mother Emanuel: Two Centuries of Race, Resistance, and Forgiveness in One Charleston Church was a finalist for the 2026 Pulitzer Prize for General Nonfiction.

== Career ==
Before joining the Times, Sack was a national correspondent in the Atlanta bureau of The Los Angeles Times, Atlanta bureau chief and correspondent for The New York Times, and a reporter for The Atlanta Journal-Constitution.

== Education ==
Sack is a graduate of Duke University, 1981, with a B.A. in history. He attended the University of Witwatersrand in South Africa on a Rotary Foundation fellowship.
