= Those Who Walk in Darkness =

2003 novel by John Ridley

- First edition
- Author: John Ridley
- Cover artist: Shasti O'Leary Soudant
- Language: English
- Genre: Science fiction
- Publisher: Warner Books
- Publication date: 2003
- Publication place: United States
- Media type: Print (hardback & paperback)
- Pages: 484 (first edition, hardback)
- ISBN: 0-385-33487-7 (first edition, hardback)
- OCLC: 41315462
- Followed by: What Fire Cannot Burn

Those Who Walk in Darkness is a novel by John Ridley, published in May 2003. It details the life of a member of an elite police task force in Los Angeles that hunts down superhumans known as metanormals. It was followed in 2006 by a sequel, What Fire Cannot Burn.

== Plot summary ==
In a world where, until a few years ago, the streets were rocked by battles between colorfully clad men and women with astounding metanormal powers, the people have declared all-out war against these modern-day titans. Following the destruction of the city of San Francisco in a super-battle gone bad, the federal government has issued an executive order outlawing not only the use of super powers, but also the very people who possess them. For the beings known as Metanormals, it doesn't matter whether they were once superheroes, supervillains, or neither; if they commit crimes, save lives or just try to live normal lives without ever using their powers; they're all regarded as public enemies, and as such the legal prey of the murderous LAPD division G Platoon (presumably after SWAT's designation of D Platoon) known more familiarly as the Metanormal Tactical Unit, or "MTac."

The main character is Soledad O'Roark, a rookie MTac whose single-minded hatred of the Metas is extreme even by the obsessive standards of her profession. Soledad earns the hated nickname "Bullet" on her first call, when she uses an O'Dwyer Variable-Lethality Law Enforcement gun to blow away a rampaging pyrokinetic in the act of frying her squad. Soledad herself modified the high-tech gun, which comes complete with color-coded bullets designed to exploit the individual weaknesses of various common Metas. The gun saves her life and the lives of several of her partners, but the department brass still demotes her, and considers filing charges, for her failure to follow official procedure by using the unregistered weapon. Soledad's lawyer, Gayle, suspects a conspiracy.

Michelle, an angelic winged woman who possesses a mysterious ability to either avert disasters or bring back the dead, lives in hiding with her telepathic husband, Vaughn, and a mentally disabled metal manipulator named Aubrey. When Michelle reveals herself in order to save the lives of an entire construction crew during a deadly street collapse, Soledad shoots the winged woman dead, dismissing the horrified reaction of one witness with a shrugged "She's not an Angel. Angels don't bleed. She's just another freak."

The grieving Vaughn succumbs to his anger, which his gentle wife held in check for so long, and declares war against the MTacs.

What Fire Cannot Burn continues to follow Soledad and fellow MTAC officer Eddi Aoki as they go undercover to investigate a serial killer targeting metanormals hunts in Los Angeles, a serial killer who might work for the police.

== In film ==

An animated 2003 version of the film was released starring rapper Lil' Kim as Soledad. It was animated using Flash and was originally released on the internet before being released on DVD by Lightyear Entertainment.
