= Sheri Fink =

American journalist

Sheri Lee Fink
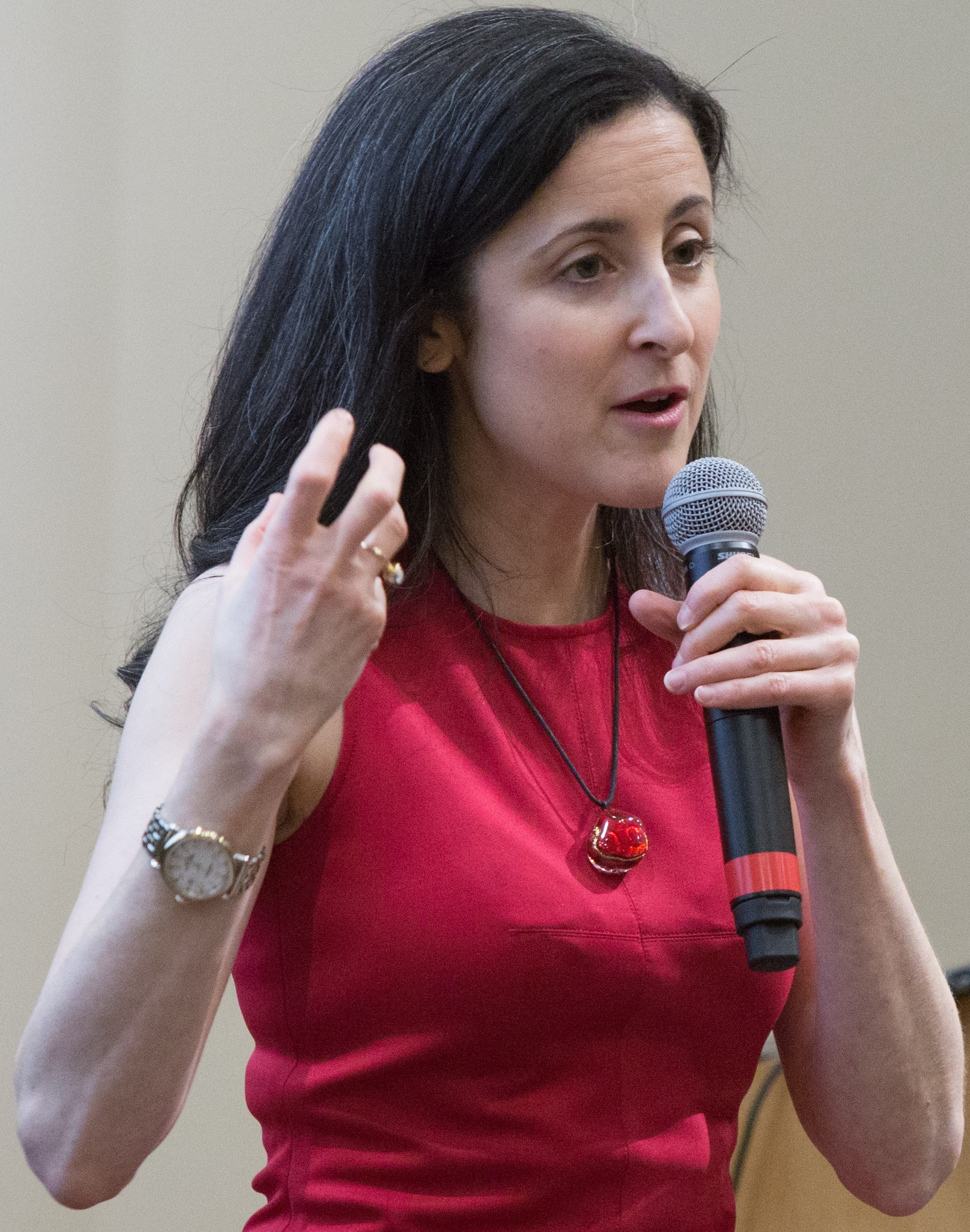
- Fink, 2016
- Born: Sheri Lee Fink; Detroit, Michigan, U.S.
- Education: University of Michigan (BS); Stanford University (PhD, MD)
- Occupations: Journalist, Author
- Employer: The New York Times
- Known for: Investigative journalism
- Notable work: Five Days at Memorial, War Hospital: A True Story of Surgery and Survival
- Awards: Pulitzer Prize for Investigative Reporting, 2010
- Website: www.sherifink.net

Sheri Fink is an American journalist who writes about health, medicine and science.

She received the 2010 Pulitzer Prize for Investigative Reporting "for a story that chronicles the urgent life-and-death decisions made by one hospital’s exhausted doctors when they were cut off by the floodwaters of Hurricane Katrina". She was also a member of The New York Times reporting team that received the 2015 Pulitzer Prize for International Reporting for coverage of the 2014 Ebola virus epidemic in West Africa. Team members named by The Times were Pam Belluck, Helene Cooper, Fink, Adam Nossiter, Norimitsu Onishi, Kevin Sack, and Ben C. Solomon.

As of April 2014, Fink is a staff reporter for The New York Times.

== Early life and education ==
Fink was born in Detroit. In 1990, Fink graduated from the University of Michigan with a B.S. degree in psychology. Fink received a Ph.D. in neuroscience in 1998 and an M.D. in 1999 from Stanford University.

Fink went to assist refugees on the Kosovo-Macedonia border during the war in Kosovo instead of attending her medical school graduation.

== Career ==
After graduating from college, Fink became involved in humanitarian aid work in disaster and war zones with the International Medical Corps, including Kosovo, Iraq, Bosnia, Macedonia and Mozambique. She also developed a career in journalism. Fink is a senior fellow with Harvard Humanitarian Initiative, a senior Future Tense fellow at New America Foundation, and formerly, a staff reporter at ProPublica in New York. Her articles have appeared in publications such as the New York Times, Discover and Scientific American.

Fink has contributed to the public radio news magazine Public Radio International (PRI)'s The World covering a number of topics including the global HIV/AIDS pandemic and international aid in development, conflict and disaster settings. In 2007, she taught a course at Tulane University on "public health issues in crisis situations". She was a 2007–2008 Kaiser Media Fellow with the Kaiser Family Foundation.

In August 2009 Fink published The Deadly Choices at Memorial, an investigative piece, in the New York Times Magazine. The article, which distilled over two years of reporting, described the aftermath of Hurricane Katrina at Memorial Medical Center in New Orleans in 2005.

== Awards an honors ==
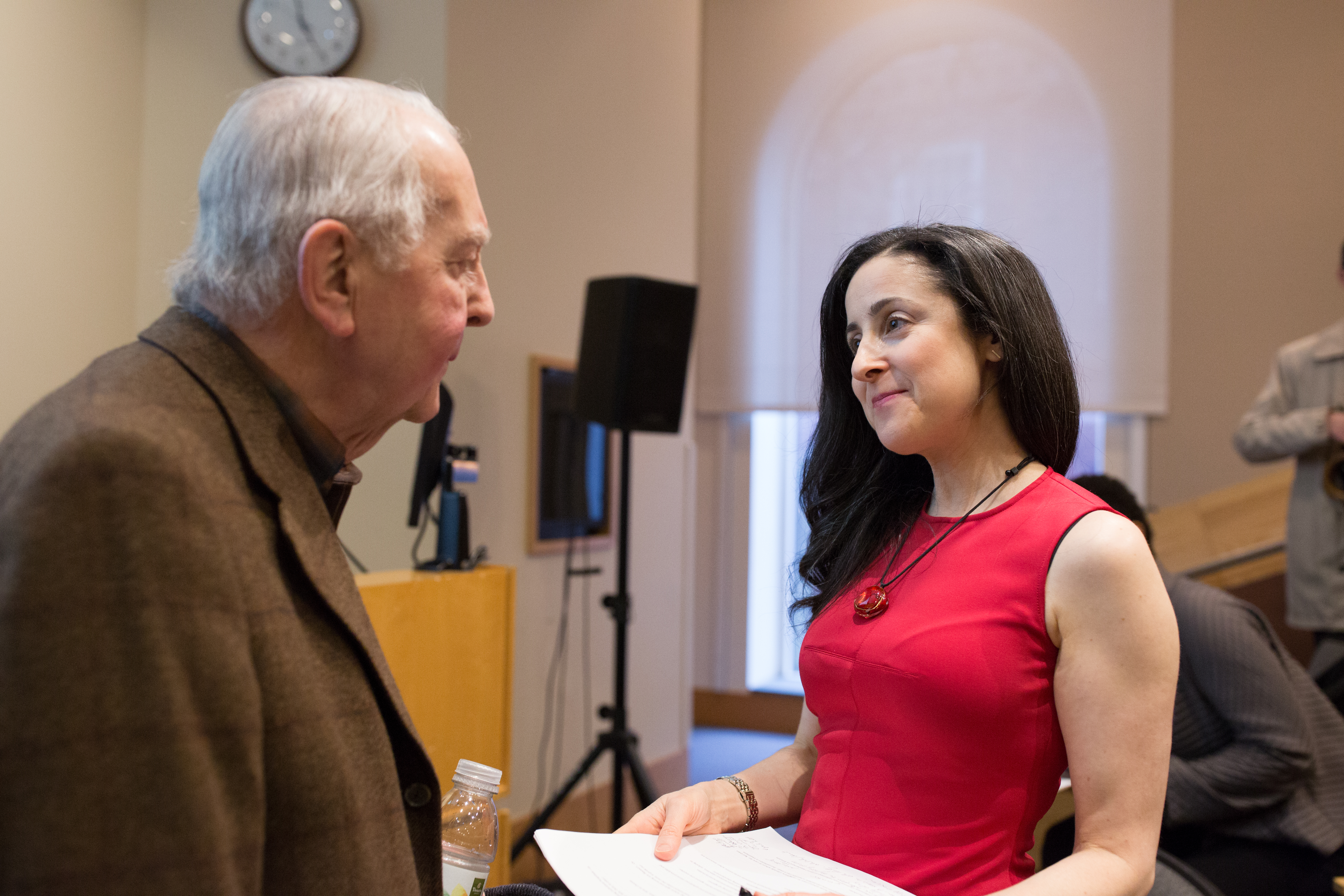
Sheri Fink in 2016 at the Edmond J. Safra Center for Ethics at Harvard University

In March 2010 The Deadly Choices at Memorial was awarded second place in the "Large Magazine" category of the Association of Health Care Journalists's (AHCJ) Awards for Excellence in Health Care Journalism. The following month Fink was awarded a Pulitzer Prize for Investigative Reporting for the article.

The article also won a 2010 National Magazine Award for Reporting, and the 2010 Dart Award for Excellence in Coverage of Trauma given by the Dart Center for Journalism and Trauma at the Columbia University Graduate School of Journalism. She was a finalist for the 2010 Michael Kelly Award.

Fink's 2013 book Five Days at Memorial, which expanded on her 2009 article, won the National Book Critics Circle Award for Nonfiction (2013), the Los Angeles Times Book Prize for Current Interest (2013), the Ridenhour Book Prize (2014), and PEN/John Kenneth Galbraith Award (2015).

In 2025, Fink was awarded an honorary Doctor of Science (D.Sc.) degree from Boston University.

== Books ==
- Fink, Sheri. Five Days at Memorial: Life and Death in a Storm-Ravaged Hospital, First edition, New York : Crown Publishers, 2013. ISBN 9780307718969
- Fink, Sheri. War Hospital: A True Story of Surgery and Survival, First edition, New York: Public Affairs, 2003. ISBN 9781586482671
