= Memorial Medical Center and Hurricane Katrina =

Memorial Medical Center (Note: The Memorial Medical Center has since changed ownership, and is now called the Ochsner Baptist Medical Center.) in New Orleans, Louisiana was heavily damaged when Hurricane Katrina struck the Gulf Coast on August 29, 2005.

Following the storm, as the hospital lost power and went through severe flooding due to the levee failures, Dr. Anna Pou and other medical staff worked to care for patients under dire conditions, with allegations that Pou played a big role in the death of the patients.

On September 11, 45 bodies were recovered from Memorial Medical Center, about five of whom had died before the disaster (originally thought to be eleven). Out of an estimated 215 bodies found in nursing homes and hospitals in New Orleans, Memorial had the largest number.

In July 2006, a Louisiana judge found probable cause to order the arrest of Pou and two nurses for second degree murder in the deaths of several of the patients, following a nearly year-long investigation by the office of Louisiana Attorney General Charles Foti. However, a year later a grand jury in Orleans Parish refused to indict Pou on any of the counts. Eventually, the charges were expunged and the State of Louisiana paid Pou's legal fees.

Louisiana Attorney General Buddy Caldwell, Foti's successor, said, "This is a prosecution that should never have been brought" forward. In 2008, Caldwell testified before the Louisiana Supreme Court in support of the position taken by lawyers for Pou and other doctors and nurses from Memorial, who were fighting to keep the state's investigative records in the case sealed from public view. He said, "the case against Dr. Pou is probably over," but that new information could lead to a renewed investigation, so the files should remain secret. The following year, Orleans Parish District Attorney Leon Cannizzaro testified in the same case that "human beings were killed as a result of actions by doctors" at Memorial after Hurricane Katrina. However, he explained that he did not plan to prosecute anyone. "Whether or not there was a homicide and whether or not there is a case that can be brought are different matters."

== During Katrina ==
Pou, an associate professor in the Department of Otorhinolaryngology at the LSU Health Sciences Center, was at Memorial Medical Center from before Katrina's landfall on Monday, August 29 until Thursday, September 1. By Wednesday, the hospital was surrounded by floodwaters, without sanitation, running out of food, experiencing indoor temperatures up to 110 °F (43 °C), and had no electricity. The staff were ordered to evacuate the hospital by authorities. Patients on upper floors had to be carried down the stairs, and those evacuated by helicopter had to be carried up more stairs to the helipad on a separate building; several patients died while being moved. On Friday, September 2, about 2,000 patients, families and staff were evacuated.

The seventh floor at Memorial was leased to LifeCare Hospitals, a separate long-term patient care facility that aims to improve the health of ill patients to the point that they no longer need hospital care. Many of LifeCare's patients at Memorial were especially affected by the loss of electric power; seven were on ventilators.

One patient in particular, Emmett Everett, was alert and in the hospital awaiting surgery to relieve a chronic bowel obstruction, a condition not acutely life-threatening. He had fed himself breakfast that morning and asked the staff, "Are we ready to rock and roll?". One of his nurses later told investigators he had said, "Cindy, don't let them leave me behind." According to witnesses speaking to The New York Times, Pou was alleged to have administered a lethal cocktail of drugs to Everett with the intent of ending his life. Everett was a paraplegic and weighed approximately 380 pounds (170 kg); for these reasons, according to staff who participated in the discussion, Pou allegedly didn't think the staff could reasonably assist him in the evacuation.

== Investigation ==
On September 11, mortuary workers recovered 45 bodies from the hospital. Toxicology tests were performed on 41 bodies; 23 tested positive for one or both of morphine and the fast-acting sedative midazolam (Versed), although few of these patients had been prescribed morphine for pain. In the following weeks, it was reported that staff had discussed euthanizing patients. Some reports went further; According to LifeCare's pharmacy director, he was informed by Dr. Pou that it had been decided to administer lethal doses to LifeCare patients. He then said that Pou showed him a big pack of morphine vials, and that before he left, he saw Pou and two other nurses enter the rooms of remaining LifeCare patients. In response to these allegations, Dr. Pou's lawyer said she and the other medical personnel, "worked tirelessly for five days to save and evacuate patients, none of whom were abandoned." LifeCare told the state Attorney General's office that nine of their patients might "have been given lethal doses of medicines by a Memorial doctor and nurses."

Dr. Bryant King, a nephrologist working at Memorial during the hurricane, publicly charged that one or more health care workers had killed patients, based on conversations with other health care workers. King told CNN that when he believed a doctor was about to kill patients, he boarded a boat and left the hospital. King explained his actions in terms of his opposition to Pou's alleged actions, arguing "I'd rather be considered a person who abandoned patients than someone who aided in eliminating patients."

At the request of the Louisiana AG's office, Orleans Parish Coroner Frank Minyard investigated the cause of the deaths. Experts reported abnormal levels of morphine, midazolam (Versed), and/or Lorazepam in several bodies. A number of forensic experts, including Cyril Wecht, Michael Baden, and James Young, agree that the administration of morphine and midazolam constituted homicide in many of the deaths on the seventh floor. Wecht thought eight of the nine deaths on the LifeCare floor could conclusively be ruled homicides, and Baden thought all nine constituted homicide. Young stated, "All these patients survived the adverse events of the previous days, and for every patient on a floor to have died in one three-and-a-half-hour period with drug toxicity is beyond coincidence." One of the experts, an internist, wrote that Everett was "in stable medical status with no clear evidence that death was imminent or impending". University of Pennsylvania bioethicist Arthur Caplan also wrote in his expert report that all nine of the deaths constituted active euthanasia; the administration of the drugs was "not consistent with the ethical standards of palliative care that prevail in the United States," precisely in that the death of a patient must not be the goal of a doctor's treatment; and death, in his opinion, was the goal in these cases.

Having received these six reports indicating that at least eight of the nine deaths under investigation were homicides, Minyard sought the opinion of another expert, Steven Karch, who specializes in disputing drug toxicology tests performed after death. According to the New York Times, Karch "had staked his career on advancing the argument that the level of drugs found in a cadaver may have no relationship to the levels just before death." The Times continued: "Karch flew to New Orleans, examined the evidence and concluded that it was absurd to try to determine causes of death in bodies that had sat at 100 °F (38 °C) for 10 days. In all of the cases, he advised, the medical cause of death should remain undetermined." Having received this opinion, Minyard sought no further opinions.

Investigators believed up to two dozen patient deaths might have been homicides, but stated that they had difficulty acquiring the medical records needed to document the patients' conditions. Tenet Healthcare said it turned over all the patient records it had on the case. Investigators believed that of the two dozen possible cases, they initially had the strongest case in the deaths of four of the patients who had died on the hospital's seventh floor.

On July 17, 2006, Pou was arrested and charged with four counts of second-degree murder in connection with the deaths of four LifeCare patients; nurses Lori Budo and Cheri Landry were arrested and charged, but charges were dropped in exchange for their testimony. In a statement, Tenet Healthcare, who owns the medical center, said "Euthanasia is repugnant to everything we believe as ethical health-care providers, and it violates every precept of ethical behavior and the law. It is never permissible under any circumstances." State Attorney General Charles Foti announced the arrests the next day, at a widely televised news conference. He stated: "This is not euthanasia; this is plain and simple homicide". Foti said he had probable cause to make the arrests based on eyewitness testimony, which was outlined in an affidavit that stated Pou and the nurses "intentionally (killed)" Emmett Everett Sr., 61; Hollis Alford, 66; Ireatha Watson, 89; and Rose Savoie, 90, by administering or causing to be administered lethal doses of morphine sulphate (morphine) and/or midazolam (Versed). One witness in the affidavit said they saw Dr. Pou request additional syringes filled with saline. According to Kristy Johnson, LifeCare's director of physical medicine, Pou told these patients that she was administering drugs to make them "feel better." The drugs injected are usually given for pain purposes, but not at the levels found in subsequent toxicology reports. Attorneys for the three accused deny any wrongdoing, and say their clients performed heroic acts under unimaginable conditions.

The arrests were controversial. In the words of Times-Picayune reporter James Varney, they "ignited a furious debate in New Orleans and elsewhere about whether sharp ethical boundaries can be drawn around decisions on patient comfort made in a crisis."

60 Minutes aired a report on the case in September 2006. In an interview, Pou told Morley Safer:

No, I did not murder those patients. Mr. Safer, I've spent my entire life taking care of patients.

In February 2007, seven months after Pou's arrest, Minyard spoke with the media about the deaths of the LifeCare patients. He had not yet issued a determination of cause of death in any of the cases, leaving them classified as "undetermined". Minyard told the media that he had retained some of the nation's leading experts as consultants in the case. The New York Times reported in August 2009 that Minyard privately came to the conclusion that Pou was responsible for the deaths of four of the nine patients: "I strongly do not believe she planned to kill anybody, but it looks like she did."

== Outcome ==
Assistant District Attorney Michael Morales said in 2009 that he and District Attorney Jordan "weren't gung-ho" about prosecuting the case, in part due to negative public reaction. In March 2007, a state grand jury was sworn in to consider the Memorial case. Unlike a typical grand jury, this one dealt with just one case, and functioned as an investigation instead of a review of evidence. The grand jury did not hear from Minyard's experts, some witnesses who had been present, or the Department of Justice investigator who had spent a year on the case and amassed 50,000 pages of evidence. The two nurses who had been arrested with Pou testified in her defense, after being compelled to testify in return for not being charged themselves.

The grand jury was sworn in on March 6, 2007, and prosecutors took the unusual step of having its meetings at an undisclosed location (i.e. away from the courthouse), in order to prevent the media from observing the identity of witnesses coming and going. The grand jury was selected to deal solely with the Memorial case, rather than the dozens to hundreds grand juries normally hear; prosecutors stated it could hear testimony for months. The unusual moves prompted legal observers to speculate that the district attorney considered the evidence ambiguous and wanted to be able to assure the public of a thorough investigation if he decided to drop the case without bringing formal charges. Loyola University Law Professor Dane Ciolono told the media, "Doing it this way certainly speaks to the ambiguity of the evidence and the prosecutor's deliberation as to whether to seek an indictment. . . . Or it could be that he's made up his mind that he does not want to bring charges and wants the grand jury to provide his cover."

After several months, the grand jury concluded its work by declining to indict any of the suspects on any of the charges.

The former Louisiana Attorney General, Charles Foti, hired forensic pathologists as consultants to assess autopsies and other medical information. One of them, Steven Karch, later testified before the Louisiana State Legislature that every case "should have been declared undetermined, because it is impossible to do a scientific analysis of a cadaver that has been in the sun for 10 days." Karch said after he reached this conclusion, the attorney general's office told him not to submit further reports. Foti lost the 2007 election for state Attorney General after criticism for prosecuting Pou and the nurses.

Since then, the charges have been expunged, the State of Louisiana has agreed to pay Pou's legal fees of over $450,000, and several Louisiana lawmakers have apologized for the accusations against her.

A class action lawsuit was filed on behalf of non-Tenet employees, patients and relatives who were stranded at Memorial during the hurricane. The class action alleged a number of failures by Tenet Corporation, ranging from a failed evacuation policy to the improper location of generators in the basement of the facility, which led to the loss of power.

Tenet Healthcare, while claiming no admission of liability, ultimately settled the case after jury selection began at a trial in 2011. The company set up a $25 million substantial settlement fund for all non-Tenet employees, patients and visitors who were trapped at Memorial during Katrina. To receive a share of the money, the eligible had to submit notarized claim forms indicating whether they had suffered injuries. Pou opted in for a share of the settlement.

LifeCare opted early on to pay undisclosed sums to family members of several deceased patients who sued.

Three lawsuits (Alford, Everett, and Savoie) initially filed against Pou and other parties were settled; the families had to agree to keep silent about the terms.

== Aftermath ==
In the four years following Katrina, Pou helped write and pass three laws in Louisiana offering immunity to health care workers from most civil lawsuits (except in cases of intentional misconduct) for their efforts in future mass casualty situations.

== See also ==
- Five Days at Memorial: Life and Death in a Storm-Ravaged Hospital - Book about the hospital in the aftermath of Hurricane Katrina
- Five Days at Memorial - Miniseries adaptation of the book
