= Cold Around the Heart =

- Directed by: John Ridley
- Screenplay by: John Ridley
- Produced by: Craig Baumgarten; Dan Halsted; Adam Merims
- Starring: David Caruso; Kelly Lynch; Stacey Dash; Chris Noth; John Spencer
- Cinematography: Malik Hassan Sayeed
- Edited by: Eric L. Beason
- Music by: Mason Daring
- Production companies: Baumgarten-Prophet Entertainment; Illusion Entertainment; The Kushner-Locke Company
- Distributed by: 20th Century Fox
- Release date: November 7, 1997
- Running time: 96 minutes
- Country: United States
- Language: English
- Box office: $5,171

Cold Around the Heart is a 1997 American crime film written and directed by John Ridley. The film stars David Caruso, Kelly Lynch, Stacey Dash, Chris Noth, John Spencer and Pruitt Taylor Vince. The film was released on November 7, 1997, by 20th Century Fox.

== Plot ==
Two criminals who are also lovers, Ned and Jude, kill three people in a jewelry store robbery. Ned is caught but escapes and vows revenge on Jude, who pushed him out of the getaway car. Ned is joined in his hunt for Jude by a woman hitchhiker named Bec.

== Cast ==
- David Caruso as Ned Tash
- Kelly Lynch as Jude Law
- Stacey Dash as Bec Rosenberg
- Chris Noth as "T"
- John Spencer as Uncle Mike
- Pruitt Taylor Vince as Johnny "Cokebottles" Costello
- Richard Kind as Attorney Nabbish
- Kirk Baltz as Detective Logan
- Jennifer Jostyn as Inez, The Waitress
- Tom McGowan as Gun Store Clerk
- Mark Boone Junior as Angry Man
- Jack Orend as Motel Clerk
- Tracey Ross as Nurse Woman
- Gareth Williams as Car Dealer
- Richmond Arquette as Gas Station Man
- Jack Wallace as Police Captain
- Viggis Knittridge as himself
