= Five Days at Memorial =

Book by Sheri Fink

Five Days at Memorial: Life and Death in a Storm-Ravaged Hospital
- Cover of Five Days at Memorial
- Author: Sheri Fink
- Cover artist: Chris Brand
- Language: English
- Subject: Memorial Medical Center and Hurricane Katrina
- Genre: Non-fiction
- Publisher: Crown Publishing Group
- Publication date: September 10, 2013
- Publication place: United States
- Media type: Print, e-book
- Pages: 576
- ISBN: 978-0-307-71898-3

Five Days at Memorial: Life and Death in a Storm-Ravaged Hospital is a 2013 non-fiction book by the American journalist Sheri Fink. The book details the aftermath of Hurricane Katrina at Memorial Medical Center in New Orleans in August 2005, and is an expansion of a Pulitzer Prize-winning article written by Fink and published in The New York Times Magazine in 2009. It describes the events that took place at Memorial Medical Center over five days as thousands of people were trapped in the hospital without power. The triage system put into effect deprioritized critically ill patients for evacuation, and it was later alleged that a number of these patients were euthanized by medical and nursing staff shortly before the entire hospital was evacuated on the fifth day of the crisis. Fink examines the legal and political consequences of the decision to euthanize patients and the ethical issues surrounding euthanasia and health care in disaster scenarios. The book was well received by most critics and won three awards, including a National Book Critics Circle Award for non-fiction.

The book was set to be the basis of the third season of the FX anthology true crime series American Crime Story before being scrapped. It has been adapted as a miniseries by John Ridley and Carlton Cuse for Apple TV+.

== Background ==
Five Days at Memorial originated as a 13,000-word magazine article titled "The Deadly Choices at Memorial", published by The New York Times Magazine in August 2009, the fourth anniversary of Hurricane Katrina. The story focused on the events that unfolded in New Orleans' Memorial Medical Center (now Ochsner Baptist Medical Center) when the hospital was flooded and its generators failed in the aftermath of Katrina, drawing particular attention to the euthanasia of numerous patients by the medical and nursing staff. Fink was drawn to the subject matter because of her experience as a doctor working in areas of conflict and as a journalist reporting on hospitals in war zones. The article, which was a joint assignment for ProPublica and The New York Times Magazine, drew on two years' worth of research and interviews with 140 people and won the 2009 Pulitzer Prize for Investigative Reporting.

While she was writing "The Deadly Choices at Memorial", Fink decided to expand the article into a book. Since she "kept finding out new facts and trying to fit them into the story because they seemed essential", she was encouraged by her editor to save the extra material to publish in a book. Expanding on her original research, Fink conducted over 500 interviews with people who were at the hospital during the disaster, families of the dead patients, hospital executives, law enforcement officials and ethicists. She interviewed Dr. Anna Pou, one of the principal characters of the story, about her experiences at Memorial, but Pou declined to discuss details related to patient deaths based on her lawyer's advice. Fink said that while "some of the medical and nursing professionals were observing a code of silence", she was impressed by the openness of several staff members, including two doctors who talked freely of their decision to euthanize their patients. Fink also reviewed photographs, videos, emails and diary entries produced at the time, and consulted weather reports and the hospital's floor plans.

== Content ==
The book is divided into two parts. The first part, titled "Deadly Choices", focuses on the events that occurred at Memorial Medical Center over the "five days" referred to in the book's title: August 29 – September 2, 2005. During these five days, Memorial's emergency plans proved inadequate as the hospital lost power and its back-up generators had failed, leaving it without lights, air conditioning, sewer systems and essential medical equipment. Thousands of staff, patients and evacuees were trapped by floodwaters inside the building awaiting evacuation by boat or helicopter. Fink describes the unconventional method of triage adopted by the medical staff, whereby ambulatory patients were prioritized for evacuation and those with "do not resuscitate" orders were placed last in the list. Patient evacuation began on the third day and progressed slowly until the fifth day, when some medical staff decided to hasten the deaths of critically ill patients, believing they would not survive, with lethal injections of morphine. The story is described from the perspective of several participants, pieced together from interviews, emails and phone logs.

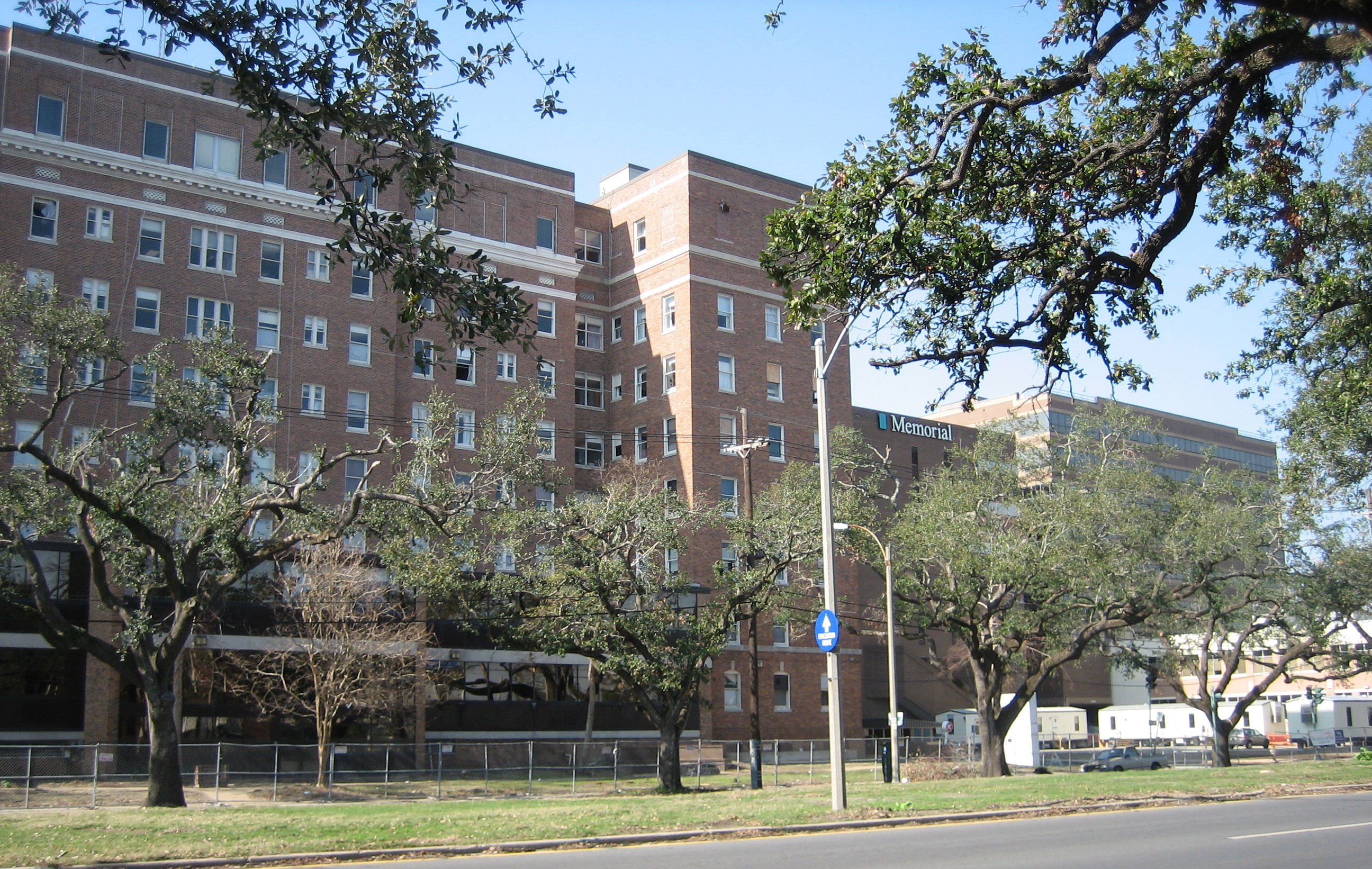
Memorial Medical Center in January 2006, still closed after Hurricane Katrina

The second part, titled "Reckoning", discusses the legal and political ramifications of Memorial's response to the crisis and especially the decisions to euthanize patients. In total, 45 patients died before the hospital was evacuated and 23 were identified as having concentrations of morphine and other drugs in their tissues. Fink focuses largely on the investigation into the actions of Dr. Anna Pou and two intensive care nurses, Cheri Landry and Lori Budo, all three of whom were charged with second-degree murder following allegations that they had administered lethal doses of morphine to some patients. The public's sympathy lay largely with the three accused Memorial staff; the charges against Landry and Budo were eventually dropped, and a grand jury chose not to indict Pou in 2007. Fink discusses the ethical issues surrounding the events at Memorial, as well as those involved in disaster settings and euthanasia in general. A brief epilogue critiques health care protocols in disasters and uses the example of Hurricane Sandy in 2012 to illustrate the lack of change undertaken by hospitals in response to the disaster caused by Katrina and a failure of the US government to enforce standards for "emergency preparedness".

== Reception ==
Critical reviews of Five Days at Memorial were mostly positive. Jason Berry of The New York Times commended the "shimmering intelligence" of Fink's discussion of the events and their ethical issues, and summarized the book as "social reporting of the first rank". Another New York Times critic, bioethicist Sherwin B. Nuland, felt the book displayed "masterly reporting and the glow of fine writing" and offered particular praise for the tone and language of Fink's writing. The Independent's Hirsh Sawhney admired the detail and variety of perspectives offered in the book and described the book as "soar[ing] to artistic and intellectual heights undreamed of in other realms of media". Peter Beaumont, writing for The Guardian, found parts of the book awkward in structure, but felt that overall it was "tight, provocative and gripping" with a "fair and deeply sympathetic" approach to the involved parties. A review by John B. Saul in The Seattle Times commended Fink's ability to produce a "compelling and revealing account" of events despite limited access to evidence such as investigative reports and Pou's testimony, while the Star Tribune's Curt Schleier described Five Days at Memorial as "an important book that will make your blood boil no matter which side of the issue you support".

A more negative review came from Julia M. Klein of The Boston Globe, who found the book to be "overly long and detailed, sometimes hard to follow, and without a real narrative payoff" and felt that Fink's conclusions were presented more clearly in her original magazine article than in the book. Salon magazine's Laura Miller found the first half of the book lacking in "shape or coherence, the meaning of this or that detail unclear and the timeline occasionally muddled", but was more impressed with the discussion of the disaster aftermath in the second half. NPR critic Susan Jane Gilman faulted the book for "provok[ing] more debate than it answers" but praised Fink's "fair and balanced", "nuanced" writing.

=== Awards and honors ===
Five Days at Memorial won the 2014 National Book Critics Circle Award for non-fiction, the 2013 Los Angeles Times Book Prize in the Current Interest category, the 2014 Ridenhour Book Prize, and the PEN/John Kenneth Galbraith Award (2015). It was shortlisted for the 2014 Andrew Carnegie Medal for Excellence in Nonfiction. It was an ALA Notable Books for Adults (2014), YALSA Outstanding Books for the College Bound (2014; Science and Technology) and Christian Science Monitor "15 Best" (2013; Nonfiction).

== Miniseries ==
On September 1, 2020, it was announced that Apple TV+ had given a series order to a television limited series adaptation of the book. John Ridley and Carlton Cuse served as showrunners, writers, and executive producers. Ridley directed the limited series, which was produced by ABC Signature,

The stars of the series included Vera Farmiga, Adepero Oduye, Cornelius Smith Jr., Julie Ann Emery, Cherry Jones, Molly Hager, and Michael Gaston.
