= John Ridley =

American writer and director

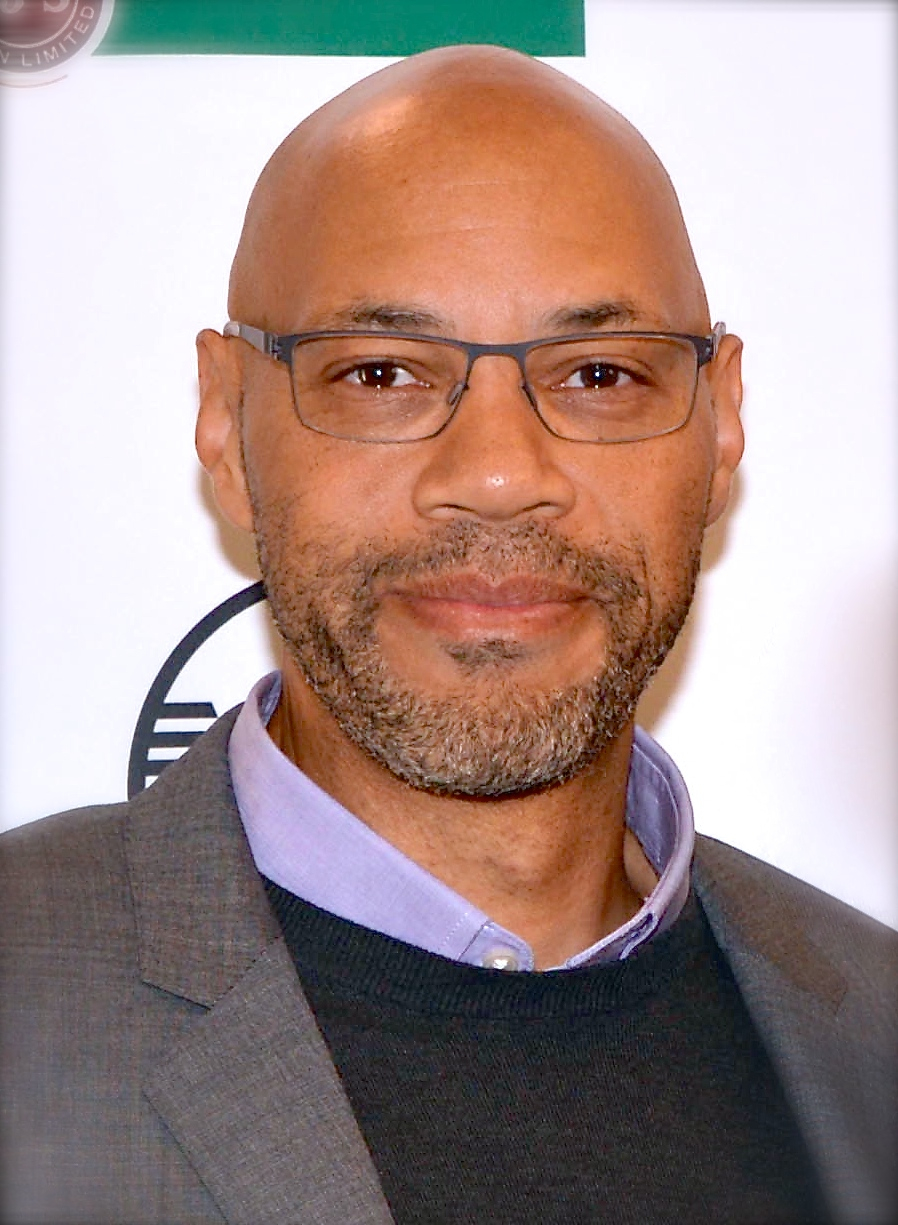
- Ridley in 2013
- Born: John Ridley IV; October 1, 1964 (age 62); Milwaukee, Wisconsin, U.S.
- Education: New York University
- Occupations: Screenwriter; Novelist; Television writer Television director
- Years active: 1988–present
- Notable work: 12 Years a Slave; American Crime
- Spouse: Gayle Ridley
- Children: 2

John Ridley IV (born October 1, 1964) is an American screenwriter, television director, novelist, and showrunner, known for 12 Years a Slave, for which he won an Academy Award for Best Adapted Screenplay. He is also the creator and showrunner of the anthology series American Crime. In 2017 he directed the documentary film Let It Fall: Los Angeles 1982–1992.

== Early life ==
Ridley was born in Milwaukee, Wisconsin, and was raised from the age of seven in Mequon, Wisconsin, with an ophthalmologist father, John Ridley III, and a mother, Terry Ridley, who was a special education teacher for Milwaukee Public Schools. He has two sisters and is the middle sibling.

Ridley graduated from Homestead High School in Mequon, Wisconsin in 1982. He enrolled in Indiana University but transferred to New York University. There, he graduated with a bachelor's degree in East Asian languages. The subject wasn't applicable to his career, but it sparked his intellectual interests. Ridley is Christian.

== Career ==
Following college, Ridley spent a year living and traveling in Japan. Then, he returned to New York and began performing standup comedy in New York City, and he made appearances on Late Night with David Letterman and The Tonight Show Starring Johnny Carson. Moving to Los Angeles in 1990, he began writing for such television sitcoms as Martin, The Fresh Prince of Bel-Air, and The John Larroquette Show. After both writing and directing his film debut, the 1997 crime thriller Cold Around the Heart, he and Oliver Stone co-adapted Ridley's first novel, Stray Dogs (still unpublished when Stone bought the rights) into the 1997 Stone-directed film U Turn, which was released slightly earlier than Cold Around the Heart. Ridley went on to write the novels Love Is a Racket and Everybody Smokes in Hell.

He challenged himself to see how quickly he could write and sell a script, and produced and sold the original screenplay Spoils of War in 18 days, which was later adapted into the 1999 David O. Russell-directed Three Kings. Russell claimed he did not read Ridley's script, and just took the idea. Ridley received a "story by" credit negotiated among himself, Russell, and the releasing studio, Warner Bros. Ridley then became a writer and a supervising producer on the NBC crime drama Third Watch. His other novels are The Drift, Those Who Walk in Darkness, and A Conversation with the Mann. He also wrote the graphic novel The American Way.

From 2000 to 2010, he was a commentator and blogger for NPR. His blog was Visible Man, a play on Ralph Ellison's Invisible Man. In 2003, Ridley inked a one-year overall deal with Universal Network Television.

His work as screenwriter also includes 12 Years a Slave, Red Tails, and Undercover Brother. His script for 12 Years a Slave won the Academy Award for Best Adapted Screenplay, making Ridley the second African American to win the award, after Geoffrey S. Fletcher (for Precious, based on the novel Push by Sapphire).

In April 2015, Ridley was developing an ABC television series involving an existing Marvel Comics character. However, by December 2019, the project was cancelled due to Marvel Television folding into Marvel Studios. Ridley later revealed that his cancelled project would have been a version of Eternals, which was instead developed as an unrelated movie directed by Chloé Zhao.

On April 16, 2018, it was announced that Ridley would direct and write an adaptation of his graphic novel The American Way produced by Blumhouse Productions.

On June 4, 2018, it was announced that Ridley would direct a feature film adaptation of the Robert Silverberg short story, Needle in a Timestack produced by Bron Studios. The film featured performances from Leslie Odom Jr., Freida Pinto, Cynthia Erivo, and Orlando Bloom.

In 2021, Ridley began writing a number of series for DC Comics. The series include a new Batman series 'The Next Batman' as part of the company's line-wide event 'Future State', and a 5-issue series 'The Other History of the DC Universe' a text-based story about the history of the non-white, non-American DC heroes such as Black Lightning and Katana.

In May 2021, Marvel Comics announced that Ridley will write Black Panther comics.

== Controversy ==
Ridley wrote an essay for the December 2006 issue of Esquire, "The Manifesto of Ascendancy for the Modern American Nigger". As the Associated Press reported, Ridley's essay had an "in-your-face style to rip the black underclass", with readers criticizing "the fact that a black person had blasted other blacks in a national magazine, with a mostly white audience." In his essay, Ridley said: "It's time for ascended blacks to wish niggers good luck. Just as whites may be concerned with the good of all citizens but don't travel their days worrying specifically about the well-being of hillbillies from Appalachia, we need to send niggers on their way." Leonard Pitts called that passage "addled" and contrary to "historical fact". South Florida Sun-Sentinel columnist Sherri Winston compared the essay to Chris Rock's monologue "Niggas vs. Black People" and commented: "...where Rock was hailed, Ridley was assailed." The essay gained renewed attention in 2014 after Ridley won an Academy Award for 12 Years a Slave.

In December 2007, during the Writers Guild of America strike against the major production studios, Ridley opted for legal status as a "union objector" or "fi-core," making him eligible to submit scripts to the studios while the strike was ongoing. In an op-ed published in the Los Angeles Times, Ridley explained: "After 15 years of being told shut up, sit down and be part of the groupthink, I decided I did not belong in the guild. The guild has a way to option out. I took the option." Ridley's screenplay for 12 Years a Slave was thus ineligible for a Writers Guild of America Award.

== Personal life ==
Ridley is married to wife Gayle, a former script supervisor. They have two children.

=== Legal issues ===
In April 2024, Asta Jonasson, an Asian American development executive, filed a lawsuit in Los Angeles Superior Court (Case No. 24STCV08350) alleging gender and racial discrimination, wrongful termination, and retaliation after she requested equal pay. The suit named John Ridley IV, The Walt Disney Company, and ABC Studios as defendants, claiming they failed to address systemic pay disparities and a hostile work environment during productions including American Crime.

Jonasson's complaint cited instances where Ridley allegedly dismissed concerns about hiring disparities, including a 2020 incident where Apple TV+ challenged him over exclusively selecting white male department heads for Five Days at Memorial. Ridley reportedly responded, "They have me," referring to his own identity as a Black man in a leadership role. Ridley's attorney denied the allegations as “false,” to Rolling Stone while Disney and ABC declined to comment. As of November 2026, a jury trial is scheduled for June 1, 2027, in the Los Angeles Superior Court.

== Filmography ==
=== Film ===
Year	Title	Director	Writer	Producer	Notes
1997	U Turn	No	Yes	No	Co-written with Oliver Stone
1997	Cold Around the Heart	Yes	Yes	No	
1999	Three Kings	No	Story	No	Story by, screenplay by David O. Russell
2002	Undercover Brother	No	Yes	No	Co-written by Michael McCullers
2012	Red Tails	No	Yes	No	Story by, co-written by Aaron McGruder
2013	Jimi: All Is by My Side	Yes	Yes	No	
2013	12 Years a Slave	No	Yes	Executive	Academy Award for Best Adapted Screenplay; Nominated - BAFTA Award for Best Adapted Screenplay; Nominated - Golden Globe Award for Best Screenplay
2016	Ben-Hur	No	Yes	No	Co-written by Keith Clarke
2017	Let It Fall: Los Angeles 1982–1992	Yes	No	Yes	Documentary
2021	Needle in a Timestack	Yes	Yes	Executive	
2024	Shirley	Yes	Yes	Yes	

=== Television ===
Year	Title	Director	Writer	Producer	Creator	Notes
1993	Martin	No	Yes	No	No	3 episodes
1994	The Fresh Prince of Bel-Air	No	Yes	No	No	2 episodes
1995	The John Larroquette Show	No	Yes	Co-producer	No	2 episodes
1996	The Show	No	Yes	Consulting	No	Episode: "Tom and Them"
1998	Team Knight Rider	No	Yes	No	No	Episode: "E.M.P."
1999	Trinity	No	Yes	No	No	Episode: "Having Trouble with the Language"
1999–2004	Third Watch	No	Yes	Consulting	No	8 episodes
2003	Platinum	Yes	Yes	Executive	Yes	Directed episode: "Peace"
2003	Static Shock	No	Yes	No	No	Episode: "Toys in the Hood"
2004	Justice League	No	Yes	No	No	Episode: "Starcrossed: Part II"
2005	Barbershop: The Series	Yes	Yes	Executive	No	Also developer; Directed 3 episodes, wrote 7 episodes
2009	The Wanda Sykes Show	No	No	Executive	No	
2015–2017	American Crime	Yes	Yes	Executive	Yes	Directed 5 episodes, wrote 8 episodes
2017	Guerrilla	Yes	Yes	Executive	Yes	Directed 3 episodes, wrote 5 episodes
2019	Godfather of Harlem	Yes	No	No	No	Episode: "By Whatever Means Necessary"
2022	Five Days at Memorial	Yes	Yes	Executive	Yes	Directed 3 episodes, wrote 5 episodes

Acting credits

Year	Title	Role	Episode
1993	Martin	Man with car (uncredited)	"Hollywood Swinging: Part 2"
1994	The Fresh Prince of Bel-Air	Himself	"Will's Up a Dirt Road"
2016	Lady Dynamite	Himself	"White Trash"

=== Awards and nominations ===
Year	Title	Awards
1997	Cold Around the Heart	Urbanworld Film Festival Jury Prize for Best Director
1999	Three Kings	Nominated—Golden Satellite Award for Best Original Screenplay (shared with David O. Russell); Nominated—Writers Guild of America Award for Best Original Screenplay (shared with David O. Russell)
2002	Undercover Brother	Nominated—Black Reel Award for Best Screenplay
2013	12 Years a Slave	Academy Award for Best Adapted Screenplay African-American Film Critics Association Award for Best Screenplay; Alliance of Women Film Journalists Award for Best Adapted Screenplay; Austin Film Critics Association Award for Best Adapted Screenplay; Austin Film Critics Association Award for Best Adapted Screenplay; Black Reel Award for Best Screenplay; Broadcast Film Critics Association Award for Best Screenplay; Chicago Film Critics Association Award for Best Adapted Screenplay; Dallas-Fort Worth Film Critics Association Award for Best Screenplay; Florida Film Critics Circle Award for Best Adapted Screenplay; Houston Film Critics Society Award for Best Screenplay; Independent Spirit Award for Best Screenplay; NAACP Image Award for Outstanding Writing in a Motion Picture; Online Film Critics Society Award for Best Adapted Screenplay; San Francisco Film Critics Circle Award for Best Adapted Screenplay; St. Louis Film Critics Association Award for Best Adapted Screenplay; Washington D.C. Area Film Critics Association Award for Best Adapted Screenplay; Nominated—AACTA International Award for Best Screenplay; Nominated—London Film Critics' Circle Award for Best Screenplay; Nominated—San Diego Film Critics Society Award for Best Adapted Screenplay; Nominated—Satellite Award for Best Adapted Screenplay; Nominated—Vancouver Film Critics Circle Award for Best Screenplay
2015–2017	American Crime	NAACP Image Award for Outstanding Director in a Drama Series; Nominated—Primetime Emmy Award for Outstanding Writing for a Limited Series, Movie, or Dramatic Special

== Works and publications ==
=== Novels ===
- Ridley, John. Stray Dogs. New York: Ballantine Books, 1997. ISBN 978-0-345-41345-1
- Ridley, John. Love Is a Racket: A Novel. New York: Knopf, 1998. ISBN 978-0-375-40142-8
- Ridley, John. Everybody Smokes in Hell. New York: Alfred A. Knopf, 1999. ISBN 978-0-375-40143-5
- Ridley, John. A Conversation with the Mann: A Novel. New York: Warner Books, 2002. ISBN 978-0-446-52836-8
- Ridley, John. The Drift. New York: Knopf, 2002. ISBN 978-0-375-41182-3
- Ridley, John. Those Who Walk in Darkness New York: Warner Books, 2003. ISBN 978-0-446-53093-4
- Ridley, John, and Patricia R. Floyd. What Fire Cannot Burn. Prince Frederick, MD: Recorded Books, 2011, 2007. ISBN 978-1-456-10151-0

=== Graphic novels ===
- Ridley, John, and Ben Oliver. The Authority: Human on the Inside. La Jolla, CA: WildStorm Productions, 2004. ISBN 978-1-401-20070-1
- Ridley, John. The Razor's Edge: Warblade #1-5. DC Comics. 2005.
- Ridley, John, Georges Jeanty, and Karl C. Story. The American Way. La Jolla, Calif: WildStorm/DC Comics, 2007. ISBN 978-1-401-21256-8
- Ridley, John, Giuseppe Camuncoli, Andrea Cucchi, and José Villarrubia. The Other History of the DC Universe. DC Comics, 2021. ISBN 978-1-779-51197-3
- Ridley, John. I Am Batman #0-17.
  - Ridley, John, Olivier Coipel, Travel Foreman, Stephen Segovia, and Christian Duce. I Am Batman Vol. 1. DC Comics, 2022. ISBN 978-1779516619
  - Ridley, John, Christian Duce, Ken Lashley, and Stephen Segovia. I Am Batman Vol. 2: Welcome to New York. DC Comics, 2023. ISBN 978-1779519979
  - Ridley, John and Christian Duce. I Am Batman Vol. 3: The Right Question. DC Comics, 2023. ISBN 978-1779520548

=== Stage plays ===
- Ridley, John. Ten Thousand Years. 2005 (world premiere).

=== Essays ===
- Ridley, John (December 2006). "The Manifesto of Ascendancy for the Modern American Nigger". Esquire. Vol. 146, no. 6. Archived from the original on February 8, 2015.
