= Shirley (2024 film) =

2024 biographical drama film by John Ridley

- Release poster
- Directed by: John Ridley
- Written by: John Ridley
- Produced by: Regina King; Reina King; Anikah McLaren; Elizabeth Haggard; John Ridley
- Starring: Regina King; Lance Reddick; Lucas Hedges; Brian Stokes Mitchell; Christina Jackson; Michael Cherrie; André Holland; Terrence Howard
- Cinematography: Ramsey Nickell
- Edited by: JoAnne Yarrow
- Music by: Tamar-kali
- Production companies: Participant; Royal Ties Productions
- Distributed by: Netflix
- Release dates: March 15, 2024 (United States); March 22, 2024 (Netflix)
- Running time: 117 minutes
- Country: United States
- Language: English

Shirley is a 2024 American biographical drama film written and directed by John Ridley. The film stars Regina King in the title role, alongside Lance Reddick, Lucas Hedges, Brian Stokes Mitchell, Christina Jackson, Michael Cherrie, André Holland, and Terrence Howard.

It depicts the 1972 presidential run of Shirley Chisholm, who was the first Black woman to be elected to the United States Congress.

Shirley had a limited theatrical release in the United States on March 15, 2024, before its streaming debut on Netflix on March 22, 2024.

== Plot ==
Shirley Chisholm, shortly after being elected as the first Black woman to the United States Congress for Brooklyn, immediately butts heads. Firstly, one of her colleagues essentially bullies her daily by marvelling to her that they all receive the same high salary. Then she protests that, as a new congressperson, she is automatically assigned to an agricultural committee although she represents an urban borrough. Shirley is informed that a new congressperson she is expected to toe the line.

At Christmas 1971, after being told voters raised double what she had asked to put herself on the ballot, Shirley decides to run for president of the United States in 1972, becoming the first Black candidate to run for a major-party nomination for president and the first woman to run for the Democratic Party's nomination. Present are her husband Conrad, Mac Holder and Arthur Harwick Jr. who are designated as security, campaign advisor and head of finances, respectively.

Shirley tracks down the now Cornell student Robert Gottlieb to be her national student coordinator as 18-year-olds finally have the right to vote. Stanley Townsend is taken on as campaign manager.

As Shirley is campaigning around the country, due to time and financial contraints, she rejects going to several states. After getting a fraction of the Democratic votes in Florida, she caves in to Walter Fauntroy. Shirley backs out of the D.C. vote to supposedly not split it, as he promises to later pass her his delegates and endorse her.

When the major TV networks NBC, ABC and CBS leave Shirley off the list to debate nationally, the campaign turns to Robert. A law student, he goes ahead to try to sue them for her right to be heard.

As The New York Times is about to do a profile piece on her, Shirley asks her sister Muriel if she and their other sisters will support her. Soon, she learns her family and many in the neighborhood feel she received favoritism from their father and she is alienating them. Muriel states they will not talk to the press, and leaves.

At a campaign fundraiser and party, someone pocketed most of the donations. Frustrated and calling the campaign a joke, Stanley quits. Shirley convinces him to accompany her to her office, where she chastises him for undermining her in front of everyone, then fires him. Dejected, Arthur voices his support both if Shirley keeps in the race or not.

After Shirley tells Conrad of the additional expenses needed to continue her campaign through California to have influence at the DNC, they argue. However, he ultimately hands her the reigns.

Robert's case against the networks is ultimately successful, so Shirley gets her airtime to get her platform exposure and heard in the debates. A meeting with the Black Panthers, she gains their endorsement, but does not win in the winner-takes-all California.

Seemingly gaining momentum, Shirley begins to get black delegates to be able to influence the DNC, when word comes out that Fauntroy has dropped out. Her elation of potentially having over 200 delegates is short-lived as he does not pass his delegates to her as promised. Ron Dellums also pulls his endorsement, implying that those not supporting McGovern are cynical and diabolical, dreamers and fools.

Deciding to officially pass on her remaining delegates to McGovern, she releases a statement declaring her goal was to be a catalyst for change. She continued in congress for several terms, influencing a great deal of legislation and inspiring many to also make a difference.

== Cast ==
- Regina King as Shirley Chisholm
- Lance Reddick as Wesley McDonald "Mac" Holder
- Terrence Howard as Arthur Hardwick Jr.
- Lucas Hedges as Robert C. Gottlieb
- Brian Stokes Mitchell as Stanley Townsend
- Christina Jackson as Barbara Lee
- Michael Cherrie as Conrad Chisholm
- André Holland as Walter Fauntroy
- Dorian Missick as Ron Dellums
- Amirah Vann as Diahann Carroll
- W. Earl Brown as George Wallace
- Brad James as Huey P. Newton
- Reina King as Muriel St. Hill

== Production ==
In February 2021, it was announced that a biographical film based on the life and career of Shirley Chisholm was in development, with Regina King cast in the eponymous role and John Ridley directing and writing the screenplay.

In December 2021, Lance Reddick, Lucas Hedges, André Holland, Terrence Howard, Christina Jackson, Michael Cherrie, Dorian Missick, Amirah Vann, W. Earl Brown, and Ethan Jones Romero joined the cast. Brian Stokes Mitchell, Brad James, and Reina King ultimately rounded out the cast.

As of December 7, 2021, filming had begun in Cincinnati.

== Release ==
Shirley had a limited theatrical release in the United States on March 15, 2024, before its streaming debut on Netflix on March 22, 2024.

== Reception ==
On the review aggregator website Rotten Tomatoes, 73% of 75 critics' reviews are positive, with an average rating of 6.3/10. The website's consensus reads: "Regina King does a stellar job in Shirley's title role, imbuing this fairly standard biopic with the heart and soul its subject so richly deserves." Metacritic, which uses a weighted average, assigned the film a score of 57 out of 100, based on 20 critics, indicating "mixed or average" reviews.
