= Joseph ben Solomon of Carcassonne =

Joseph ben Solomon of Carcassonne (Hebrew: יוסף בר שלמה מקרקשונה, romanized: Yosef ben Shlomo mi-Karkasona; fl. 11th century) was a French Jewish liturgical poet.

He wrote a yotzer beginning Odekha ki anafta (אודך כי אנפת) for the first Sabbath of Ḥanukkah. Joseph took material for this yotzer from the Scroll of Antiochus, the Book of Judith, the First Book of Maccabees and the Second Book of Maccabees, working it over in a payyetanic style. It is composed of verses of three lines each arranged in alphabetical order. The poem is mentioned by Rashi in his commentary on Ezekiel xxi. 18. It became an integral part of the Ashkenazi and Italian rites in the Middle Ages.
