= Ben C. Solomon =

American journalist (born 1987)

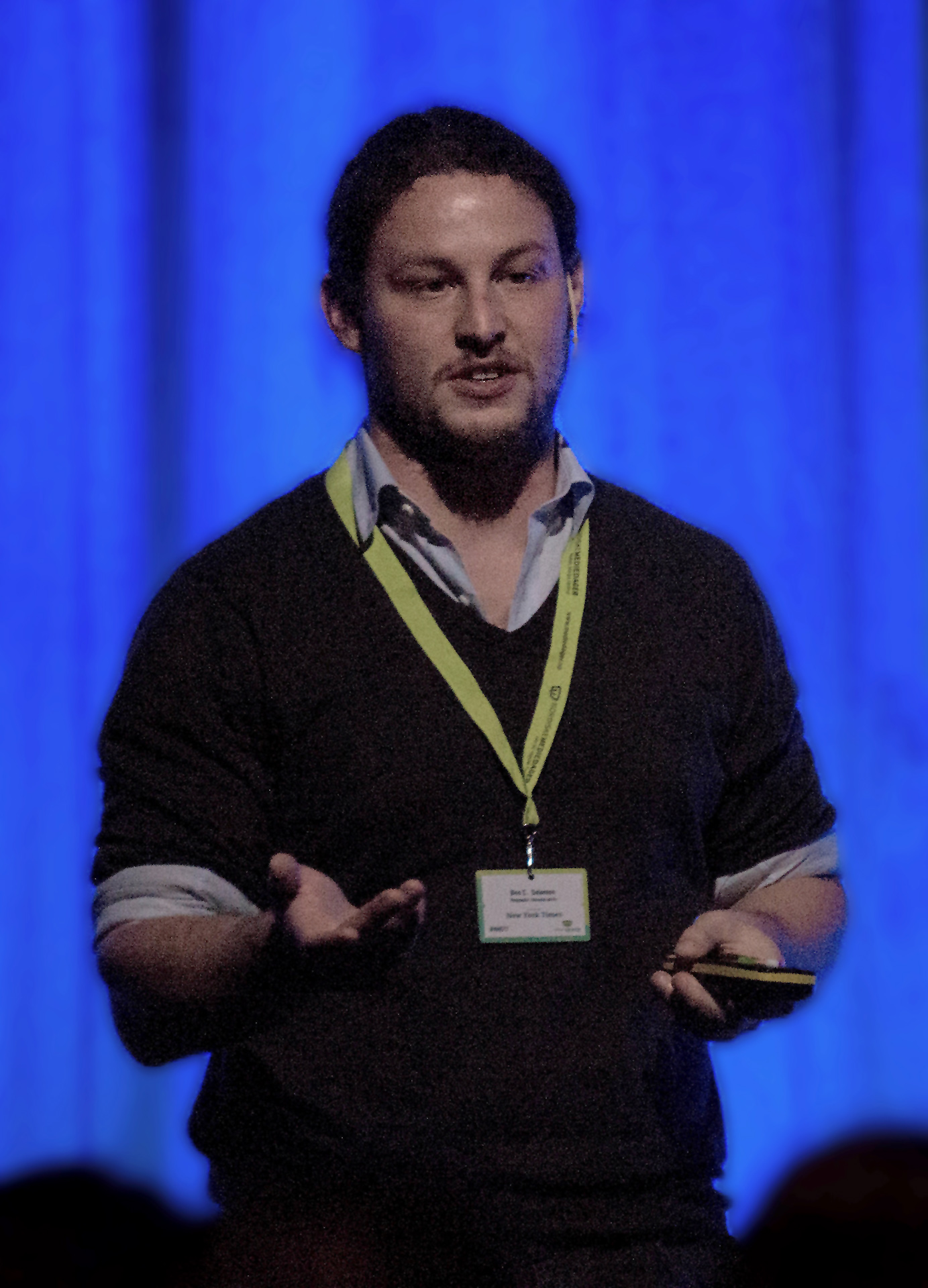
- Solomon in 2017
- Born: November 4, 1987 (age 38)
- Education: DePauw University
- Occupations: Journalist, filmmaker
- Notable credit(s): The New York Times, Frontline, Vice News, The Wall Street Journal
- Awards: Pulitzer Prize for International Reporting (2015)
- Website: https://bencsolomon.com

Ben C. Solomon (born November 4, 1987) is an American visual journalist, filmmaker, and correspondent. Since January 2024, he has served as a senior video correspondent for The Wall Street Journal. Solomon has reported from over sixty countries and covered seven wars and numerous global crises.

== Early life and education ==
Solomon graduated from Ladue Horton Watkins High School in 2006 and earned a degree in communications with a minor in studio art from DePauw University in 2010. While in college, he interned at CBS News. Shortly after graduation, he joined The New York Times as a video intern.

== Career ==
=== The New York Times and freelance reporting (2011–2019) ===
In 2011, during the Arab Spring uprisings, Solomon moved to Cairo as a freelancer, where he began covering the Syrian civil war and the Libyan civil war.

In 2014, Solomon spent three months covering the Ebola virus epidemic in West Africa. His team's coverage earned the Pulitzer Prize for International Reporting, the George Polk Award for Health Reporting, and the World Press Photo Multimedia Prize.

In 2016, Solomon embedded with the Iraqi Army to make The Fight for Fallujah, the first virtual reality film shot in an active combat zone. It garnered an Emmy Award nomination and was noted for its innovative approach.

=== PBS Frontline (2019–2020) ===
In 2019, Solomon became PBS's inaugural filmmaker-in-residence on its Frontline series. His first film, Ebola in Congo, chronicled the Ebola outbreak in eastern Democratic Republic of the Congo during armed conflict. It won a News & Documentary Emmy Award for Outstanding Video Journalism in 2019.

=== Vice News (2020–2023) ===
From 2020 to 2023, Solomon was an international correspondent for Vice News, covering conflicts in Myanmar, Afghanistan, and the Ukraine. He also reported on the January 6 United States Capitol attack, producing on-the-ground coverage of the events in Washington, D.C. In 2022, Solomon was among the first Western journalists to interview Volodymyr Zelenskyy, President of Ukraine, in a bunker during the early days of the invasion.

=== The Wall Street Journal (2024–present) ===
Since January 2024, Solomon has been a senior video correspondent at The Wall Street Journal. In his first year, he received two Emmy Award nominations for reporting from Sudan and Ukraine. His work for WSJ includes the short documentary Darwin, profiling a young Ukrainian drone pilot.

== Personal life ==
Solomon lives in Spain with his wife and son.

== Awards and recognition ==
- Pulitzer Prize for International Reporting (2015) – The New York Times Ebola outbreak coverage
- George Polk Award for Health Reporting (2014)
- World Press Photo Multimedia Award (2015) – “Ebola Ambulance”
- Cannes Lions Grand Prix (2016) – The Displaced
- World Press Photo Interactive Award (2016) – The Displaced
- News & Documentary Emmy Award – Ebola in Congo (2019)
- News & Documentary Emmy Awards – Return of the Taliban (2022)
- News & Documentary Emmy Award – Putin's War on Ukraine (2023)
- Prix Bayeux-Calvados Award, 2nd Place, Grand Format Television – The Fall of Kandahar (2022)
- Multiple additional Emmy Award nominations, including for Sudan and Ukraine coverage with The Wall Street Journal (2024)
