= Pam Belluck =

American journalist

- Education: Princeton University, Harvard and MIT
- Occupations: Journalist, author

Pam Belluck, an American journalist and author, is a health and science writer for The New York Times and author of the nonfiction book Island Practice, which is in development for a television series. Her honors include sharing a Pulitzer Prize and winning the Nellie Bly Award for Best Front Page Story.

Belluck’s coverage of the coronavirus pandemic has focused on the devastating effects of COVID-19 and the experience of COVID survivors, including long-term symptoms. She has written frequently about “long COVID” and brain-related conditions like delirium, psychosis and brain fog. She has also written about children’s experiences with COVID. Several of her coronavirus articles were honored with a 2020 Front Page Award from the Newswomen’s Club. Her coronavirus coverage has been featured on The Daily, the popular New York Times podcast, including episodes about a mysterious children’s inflammatory syndrome, the science of reopening schools and long COVID.

Belluck also writes about neuroscience, dementia, genetics, reproductive health, mental illness and other subjects. Her work on Ebola with several colleagues won the 2015 Pulitzer Prize for International Reporting and other awards. Her project about surgery for women traumatized by genital cutting won the 2019 Nellie Bly Award for Best Front Page Story, a 2020 New York Press Club Award and other honors.

== Education ==
Belluck is a graduate of Princeton University with a degree in international relations from the Princeton School of Public and International Affairs and a minor in East Asian studies. She was a Fulbright Scholar in the Philippines, a Case Media Fellow at Indiana University, and she won a Knight Journalism Fellowship to spend the 2007–08 academic year at Harvard and MIT.

== Career ==
Before joining the Times, Belluck was a staff writer for The Atlanta Journal-Constitution and The Philadelphia Inquirer, and a freelance writer for The San Francisco Chronicle. In California, she served as a Southeast Asia correspondent, based in Manila and reporting from China, Burma, Thailand, South Korea, and Hong Kong.

She was part of a team of reporters at The Atlanta Journal-Constitution whose work was a finalist for the Pulitzer Prize for general news, and part of a team of reporters at The Philadelphia Inquirer whose work was a finalist for the Pulitzer Prize for general news.

She was chosen to be a Ferris Professor of Journalism at Princeton University in 2014, and was a member of the TEDMED Editorial Advisory Board from 2015 to 2020.

She has given talks and appeared on panels at universities and medical schools, the National Academy of Sciences, the American Academy of Arts and Sciences, the American Association for the Advancement of Science, the Johns Hopkins Bloomberg School of Public Health, the Aspen Institute, the Simons Foundation, the Santa Fe Science Writing Workshop, the American Museum of Natural History, conferences in Mexico, Canada, and Ireland, and on a voyage to the Galapagos Islands.

Belluck is also a jazz flutist and performs regularly in New York City with the jazz group Equilibrium.

=== The New York Times ===
Belluck joined The Times’s science department in 2009 after more than a decade as a New York Times national bureau chief, leading the paper's Midwest and New England bureaus. She often investigates complex or controversial subjects, including gene editing, reproductive health, infectious disease, and mental illness.

Her work launched the Times's Vanishing Minds series, for which she traveled to mountain villages in Colombia to write about the world's largest family to experience Alzheimer's, to South Korea to write about innovative dementia care, and to a California men's prison where first-degree murderers care for inmates with dementia. Her two-part series Mother’s Mind showed, through months of sensitive, difficult reporting, that maternal mental illness is much more common and varied than previously thought, and that health providers should be better at detecting trouble and ensuring women receive help. It has helped spur efforts to screen women for maternal depression and assist them in getting treatment.

A three-month investigation by Belluck found that morning-after pills do not induce abortions, contrary to claims by some anti-abortion activists. Another investigative scoop revealed a prominent American scientist's interaction with the Chinese researcher whose highly controversial experiment produced the world's first gene-edited babies. Other groundbreaking stories have focused on people with severe mental illness obtaining psychiatric advance directives and a scientist whose baby has a rare, devastating mutation on the very gene the scientist studies.

She has also written about offbeat topics: the sexism of office air conditioning systems, custom-fit condoms, floating islands, the world’s oldest shoe, and the place with the longest name in America: Lake Chargoggagoggmanchauggagoggchaubunagungamaugg. Her story about a lost cat that somehow navigated 200 miles home inspired someone to write a children’s book. Belluck also contributes to multimedia, video and podcast projects for The New York Times.

Her reporting about scientists using their children as research subjects that was chosen for The Best American Science Writing, and one of the only sports stories she’s ever written (about fish shooting in Vermont) was somehow picked for The Best American Sports Writing.

=== Island Practice ===
Belluck is the author of the non-fiction book Island Practice, published in June 2012 by PublicAffairs. The book is a true tale about a colorful and contrarian doctor on Nantucket who has performed surgery with scalpels he carved from obsidian, made house calls to a hermit who lived in an underground house and a vine igloo, treated patients ranging from Kennedy relatives to a sheep with a prolapsed uterus, and diagnosed everything from tularemia to toe-tourniquet syndrome. In July 2012, Imagine Entertainment optioned the book to develop a TV series with 20th Century Fox Television, and in August 2012 the medical drama was bought by CBS. In 2014, the book was optioned for television by Original Film and CBS.

== Awards and honors ==
- 2015, Pulitzer Prize for International Reporting
- 2019, New York Press Club's Nellie Bly Award for Best Front Page Story
- 2020, New York Press Club Award
- Victor Cohn Prize for Excellence in Medical Science Reporting
