= Korean Americans in Greater Los Angeles =

Los Angeles is home to a significant Korean community. Recent statistics indicate that approximately 230,000 individuals of Korean heritage reside in the city.

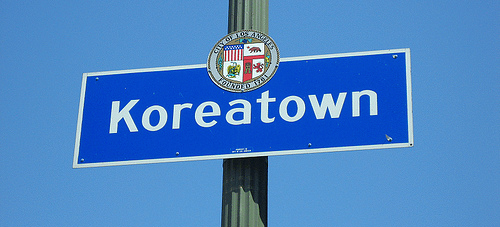
Koreatown

== History ==
A first wave of Korean immigrants settled at the foot of Bunker Hill and worked as truck farmers, domestic workers, waiters, and domestic help. The Korean United Presbyterian Church was established on West Jefferson Boulevard in 1905. A Korean community developed around this church.

The Ahn Chang Ho residence, which served as a community center and a guidance, lodging, and community support center for new Korean immigrants, housed grocery stores and the offices of the Korean National Association Los Angeles Branch and the Young Korean Academy. In the 1930s the Korean population shifted to an area between Normandie and Vermont Streets in the Jefferson Boulevard area. This Korean area, which became known as the "Old Koreatown," was in proximity to the University of Southern California. By then the first generation of Korean immigrants had children, who lived around the Old Koreatown.

In the 1950s, Los Angeles received a second wave of Korean immigrants resulting from the Korean War and the children of the first generation of immigrants gave birth to the next generation. After the passage of the Hart-Cellar Act in 1965, Korean immigration increased. After the Watts Riots in 1965, many Koreans began moving to suburban communities. In 1970, the Koreans in Los Angeles and Orange Counties made up 63% of the total number of Koreans in the United States. Around this period, the Korean community area moved to Olympic Boulevard, where the modern Koreatown is located.

The Korean community was severely affected by the 1992 Los Angeles riots. One Korean American civilian, Edward Song Lee, died in the rioting. Over $400 million worth of damages occurred, including the destruction of over 2,000 businesses owned by ethnic Koreans even as store owners and community members tried defending them using firearms from building rooftops. Most of the members of the Korean community refer to them in Korean as the 4-2-9 riot (Sa-i-gu p'oktong). This naming follows the integer naming schemes of political events in Korean history. After the event, many Koreans moved to suburbs in Orange County and the two Inland Empire counties: Riverside and San Bernardino. Since then, investment occurring in Koreatown caused the community to rebuild.

In 2014 a delegation of minor Japanese right-wing politicians requested the removal of a memorial statue of the Korean comfort women in World War II from an area in Glendale, California, sparking controversy. A federal judge dismissed the lawsuit for the statue's removal and was met with support from the Los Angeles City Council, Korea-Glendale Sister City Association, and the Korean American Forum of California as part of a "large-scale effort to raise international awareness of the comfort women's plight." The Japanese American Citizens League and other Japanese-American organizations supported the statue and deplored the Japanese delegation's claim that it had led to racially motivated bullying of Japanese-Americans as propaganda.

== Geography ==
As of 2008, about 350,000 ethnic Koreans live in Los Angeles County. As of 2008 the largest Korean ethnic enclave in Los Angeles is Koreatown and the majority of the Koreans have been concentrated around that area.

By 2008 many ethnic Korean communities had appeared in the northwestern San Fernando Valley, including Chatsworth, Granada Hills, Northridge, and Porter Ranch. That year, the San Fernando Valley Korean Business Directory had a list of almost 1,500 Korean-owned businesses in the San Fernando Valley. Amanda Covarrubias of the Los Angeles Times stated that area Korean community leaders estimated that 50,000 to 60,000 Koreans lived in the San Fernando Valley in 2008.

In addition, by 2008 Korean communities had appeared in Cerritos and Hacienda Heights in Los Angeles County, and Buena Park and Fullerton in Orange County.

Also, a long standing community, known as Koreatown or Little Seoul has been in Garden Grove since the 1970s. This formed the center of the Korean Community of Orange County which later spread out to Buena Park, Fullerton, Cypress, and Irvine.

Since the 1990s, Korean Americans in Greater Los Angeles have increasingly suburbanized, moving outward from the Koreatown area to communities in Orange County, the San Fernando Valley, and the Inland Empire. Cities such as Irvine, Buena Park, Fullerton, Cerritos, and Garden Grove in Orange County have all had a major influx of Korean American residential and commercial clusters, driven by the increasing demand for better schools, safer neighborhoods, and more affordable housing. This suburbanization has continued past the 1990s, into the 2010s and 2020s, with North Orange County, Buena Park, Irvine, and Fullerton, particularly, emerging as popular destinations for younger Korean Americans, as well as countless Korean-owned businesses that relocated from the inner city. Despite this outward mobility, Koreatown has remained a central historical, cultural, and commercial hub for the broader Korean American community.

== Demographics ==
As of 2019, approximately 320,000 Korean Americans lived in the Los Angeles metropolitan area, which includes Los Angeles, Orange, Riverside, San Bernardino, and Ventura counties, making it the U.S. metro with the largest Korean population. As of the early 2020s, Koreatown has more than 120,000 residents, and despite its name, only around 20% of the population is of Korean heritage, while the majority of residents are Latino.

== Economics ==
By 1988, in Los Angeles, many Korean stores had opened in African-American neighborhoods, and by then several boycotts by African-Americans of Korean businesses had occurred. By that time many Korean garment manufacturers acted as middlemen by employing Hispanic workers and selling product to White-owned manufacturers of clothing.

In 2014 the federal government ran a raid against business operations that it accused of being money laundering. By 2015 some Korean business owners stated that they may take their operations out of Los Angeles due to a reduction in Latin American customers, an increasing minimum wage, and stricter governmental enforcement of labor laws, all occurring after the 2014 raid.

Since the 1990s, Koreatown has seen booming real estate investment, bringing in waves of new development, transforming it from a largely immigrant, mom-and-pop business district to one of the most attractive multifamily and mixed-use markets in greater Los Angeles. Real Estate developers have added thousands of new apartments in predominantly mid and high-rise buildings, many of which have ground-floor retail, which, in turn, replaces or overshadows smaller businesses with potentially lower rents. Large firms like Jamison Properties and other institutional investors now control a good portion of office and residential properties in Koreatown, showing a shift from small to large, corporate landlords and landowners. This process of capital restructuring and development-led gentrification brings new economic opportunities and diversity to Koreatown, but also raises concerns about the displacement and pricing-out of families and business that have called the neighborhood home for generations.

== Culture ==
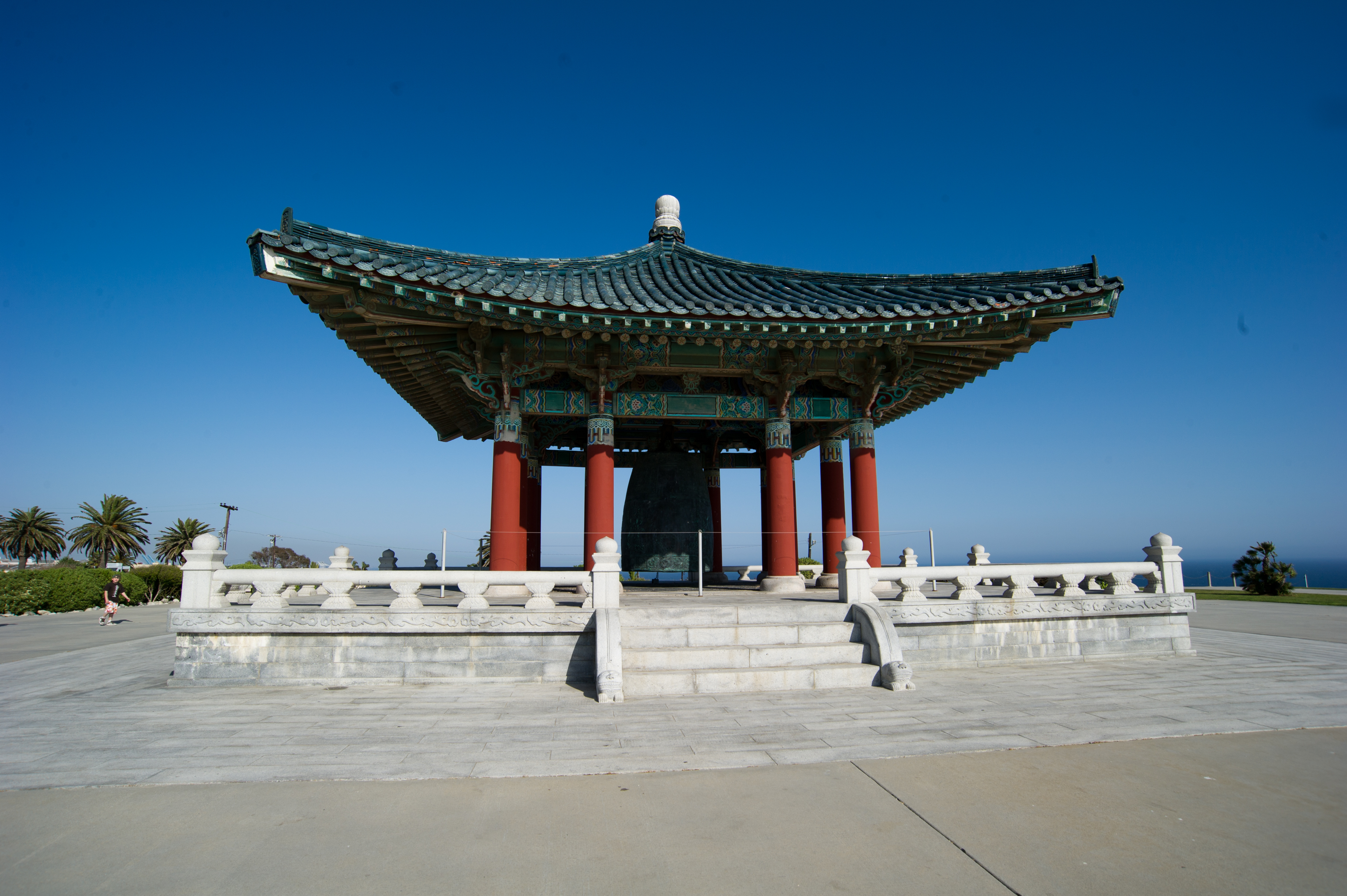
The Belfry of Friendship in San Pedro houses the Korean Bell of Friendship

The Korean Bell of Friendship is located in San Pedro.

In Los Angeles, Korean Protestant Churches have historically served as the primary social institution for Korean immigrants and Korean Americans alike. They function not only as places of worship, but also as a resource for employment, housing assistance, English education, and community engagement. The sheer density of churches in Koreatown is striking, with locations in small storefronts, to megachurches which hold thousands of people at once. Following the 1992 Los Angeles Riots, many churches took on expanded roles in the recovery, offering relief and helping to aid the rebuilding efforts across Koreatown.

Food is one of the most prominent and meaningful expressions of Korean American culture in Los Angeles. Korean restaurants, bakeries, and cafés are concentrated in Koreatown, and extend across the city into suburbs like Garden Grove, Buena Park, and Irvine, all of which have substantial Korean populations. Since the mid-2010s, the global spread of Korean pop culture, known to many as or Hallyu, “The Korean Wave,” has boosted Koreatown and Korean American communities across Los Angeles by popularizing K-pop performances and Korean film screenings. These cultural expressions attract those of Korean descent and non-Korean residents and tourists alike, reinforcing Koreatown’s ethnic and cultural diversity.

== Politics ==
According to Park (1998) the violence against Korean Americans in 1992 stimulated a new wave of political activism among Korean Americans, but it also split them into two main camps. The "liberals" sought to unite with other minorities in Los Angeles to fight against racial oppression and scapegoating. The "conservatives," emphasized law and order and generally favored the economic and social policies of the Republican Party. The conservatives tended to emphasize the political differences between Koreans and other minorities, specifically blacks and Hispanics. Abelmann and Lie, (1997) report that the most profound result was the politicization of Korean Americans, all across the U.S. The younger generation especially realized they had been too uninvolved in American politics, and the riot shifted their political attention from South Korea to conditions in the United States.

Korean Americans in Greater Los Angeles have become more prominent in politics and civic involvement, at both the local and state levels. Since the 2000s, Korean American political candidates have gained seats in the California State Legislature, on city councils, and on local school boards in both Los Angeles and Orange County. This growth shows the Korean Americans' growing political presence, surpassing small, local ethnic organizations that were formed in the wake of the 1992 LA riots. State legislators like Young Kim, who previously represented the 65th Assembly District in Orange County, and was later elected to Congress, and Steven Choi, an Irvine mayor, who served in California's 68th Assembly District, show this stark increase in Korean American political representation and participation at the broader state level. David Ryu, The First Korean American member of the Los Angeles City council, was elected by District 4 in 2015, and nearby in Irvine, Sukhee Kang was elected mayor in 2008, marking her spot as one of the first Korean Americans elected to the mayoral office of a large American city. Korean American elected officials and political candidates have also held influential school board offices in districts like the Irvine Unified School District, further showing the broader pattern of Korean American civic engagement that was often centered around education, small business success, and immigrant rights, especially in communities with substantial Korean American populations. Local community groups and church-based alliances and networks have also had a history of organizing events like voter registration drives, small business advocacy programs, and anti-Asian hate crimes, which helped to bridge the racial gap through working with other Asian American, Latino, and Black organizations, all with similar goals.

== Education ==
=== Day schools ===
The Wilshire Private School (formerly Hankook School, Wilshire Elementary School, and Wilshire School), a private day school, located in Koreatown. The Korean Institute of Southern California (KISC, 남가주한국학원/南加州韓國學院) operated this school.

Schools which served the children of the first wave of Korean immigrants included Los Angeles High School, Manual Arts High School, and the James A. Foshay Learning Center.

=== Weekend schools ===
The KISC and the Korean School Association of America (KSAA, 미주한국학교연합회/美洲韓國學校聯合會) operate weekend Korean language schools, with a combined total of 16,059 students. As of 2003 the KISC operated 12 schools, employing 147 teachers and enrolling 5,048 students. In 1992 there were 152 schools in Greater Los Angeles registered with the KSAA. In 2003 the KSAA had 244 schools, employing 1,820 teachers and enrolling 13,659 students. The number of KSAA-registered schools increased to 254 in 2005.

As of 1988 one of the KISC campuses was in Van Nuys.

== Notable people ==
- Philip Ahn - Actor
- Awkwafina - Actress
- John Cho - Actor
- Roy Choi - Chef, personality, founder of Kogi
- Steven Choi - California State Assemblyman from Orange County
- Dumbfoundead - Rapper
- Joshua Hong - Singer and member of group Seventeen
- Ken Jeong - Actor, comedian, and physician
- Jessica Jung - Singer and former member of Girls' Generation
- Daniel Dae Kim - Actor
- Krystal Jung - Singer F(x) (band)
- Young Kim - Politician resident in Orange County, local congresswoman
- Grace Lee - Film director
- Greta Lee - Actress
- Hee Sook Lee - businesswoman, founder of BCD Tofu House chain
- Joon Park - Singer G.O.D
- Song Oh-kyun - Korean Independence Activist
- Lena Park - Singer
- Cathy Park Hong - poet, writer, author of Minor Feelings: An Asian American Reckoning
- Michelle Steel, local congresswoman
- Tiffany Young - Actress and member of Girls' Generation

== See also ==
- Bibliography of California history
- Bibliography of Los Angeles
- Outline of the history of Los Angeles
- Killing of Latasha Harlins
