= Wilshire Elementary School =

Wilshire Elementary can be used to refer to:

- Wilshire Private School in Los Angeles
- Wilshire Elementary, a school of the Hurst-Euless-Bedford Independent School District in Euless, Texas
- Wilshire Elementary, a school of the North East Independent School District in San Antonio, Texas
- Wilshire Park Elementary, a school of the St. Anthony-New Brighton School District in St. Anthony Village, Minnesota
- Wilshire Park Elementary, a school of the Los Angeles Unified School District in Los Angeles, California
