= Sophia Nahli Allison =

American filmmaker and photographer

- Born: 1987 (age 38–39); Los Angeles, California
- Education: Columbia College Chicago; University of North Carolina at Chapel Hill
- Occupations: Filmmaker; Photographer
- Notable work: A Love Song for Latasha
- Style: Experimental documentary
- Website: sophianahliallison.com

Sophia Nahli Allison (born 1987) is an American documentary filmmaker and photographer. Her documentary short A Love Song for Latasha (2019) was nominated for an Academy Award for Best Documentary (Short Subject). It debuted at the Tribeca Film Festival and screened at the Sundance Film Festival in 2020. Allison directed and co-wrote the 2021 HBO Max special Eyes on the Prize: Hallowed Ground.

== Biography ==
Allison was born in Los Angeles, California in 1987. Her father died when she was 15. She earned a BA in photojournalism from Columbia College Chicago and an MA in visual communication from the University of North Carolina at Chapel Hill.

She was a MacDowell Fellow in 2019. She was also a 2020 United States Artists fellow.

=== A Love Song for Latasha ===
Allison’s documentary short, A Love Song for Latasha, reimagines the life of Latasha Harlins, a Black girl shot by a convenience store owner in Los Angeles 1991, touching off an uprising. Often described as the Rodney King riots, Allison sought to restore the memory of Harlins’ life and death and her significance. At the time, security camera footage of Harlins' death was broadcast widely on television news, but Allison's work does not include it. Instead, Jude Dry wrote in IndieWire, the 19-minute film is "bursting with sun-kissed sidewalks and faded basketball courts, clean line animation and radiant Black girls posed gracefully, like young queens." The day of the shooting is depicted in animation, intercut with VHS tape static, to heighten the sense of memory despite the lack of any home movies of Harlins.

Allison spent two years making the film, serving as director, cinematographer, editor and producer. She originally pitched it to a documentary organization she worked for, given the 25th anniversary of Harlins’ death was approaching, but their indifference and incomprehension of the subject’s significance prompted a realization for Allison that “I could no longer work within institutions that don’t validate the importance of my existence. If they don’t validate the existence of other Black women and girls then they have no right to work with me.” Instead she worked closely with Harlins’ friends, developing a depiction of their childhoods and South Central Los Angeles. Alice Walker and Saidiya Hartman were influences in Allison’s approach to creating a missing archive.

The film premiered at the Tribeca Film Festival and screened at the 2020 Sundance Film Festival. It won Outstanding Nonfiction Short at the documentary festival Cinema Eye Honors and the Grand Jury Prize for Best Documentary Short at AFI Fest. Ava DuVernay programmed the documentary as part of Array 360, and it was then picked up by Netflix. It became available for streaming on Netflix in September 2020.

The film was nominated for an Academy Award for Best Documentary (Short Subject).

=== Other work ===
In the 2021 Sundance Film Festival, Allison was part of a Sundance New Frontiers collective piece, Traveling the Interstitium with Octavia Butler, from five Black artists who used web-based extended reality (WebXR) to create Afrofuturist work. Allison’s contribution “Pluto” imagined the first astronaut’s trip to Pluto, traveling outward in the “ever-expanding universe”. The audio on the 2D film features two Black women discussing what they have been through, on a loop: in Filmmaker Magazine Randy Astle describes the work as “cyclic, ‘starting’ again where it leaves off[...] illustrating the recurring pattern of Black women forging their identities in whatever new context confronts them.” Astle felt these New Frontier works were the most successful part of the festival, held remotely due to the COVID-19 pandemic.

Allison also has an ongoing series, “Dreaming Gave Us Wings”, which engages the mythology of flying Africans. The myth stemmed from a revolt and then mass suicide by enslaved Africans at Igbo Landing as they refused to submit to slavery; the myth of flying Africans began as the story that this revolt instead ended with the Africans taking flight and returning home. Allison has created both video work and still self-portraits in which flight “represent[s] black mobility toward liberation,” she wrote in The New Yorker.
