= African American–Korean American relations =

Race relations in the United States

Tensions between African American and Korean American communities in major U.S. cities gained national attention in the 1980s and 1990s, marked by events such as the 1992 Los Angeles riots and the Family Red Apple boycott in New York. In response, organizations such as the Black–Korean Alliance emerged to alleviate tension and improve community relations.

== Shopkeeper and merchant relationships ==
Many Korean Americans living in predominantly Black neighborhoods owned small businesses such as grocery stores, liquor stores, and convenience shops, which were frequented by Black and Latino residents. Korean immigrants in these areas were often college-educated and came from middle or upper-class backgrounds in Korea, and their decision to open stores in Black and Latino neighborhoods was informed by their access to personal savings, and the minimal start-up capital required. The socioeconomic inequity between Korean and Black Americans fueled xenophobic sentiments among the African-American community in urban areas of New York, Washington DC, and Chicago. On November 15, 1986, The Philadelphia Daily News published an article titled "Go Back To Korea" about the anti-Korean boycotts.

One of the main issues claimed by Black neighborhood residents against Korean-American shop owners was their prejudiced hiring practices. Most Korean-owned stores in Black and Latino neighborhoods employed Koreans at a disproportionately high rate, which was often perceived by members of the African American community as informed by anti-Black racism. However, some scholars suggest that Korean American hiring practices were more informed by class than race: because of the downward socioeconomic mobility many Korean immigrants experienced, they could rarely afford to hire other employees outside of their small family businesses.

== Protest and boycotts ==
Beginning in the 1980s, tensions between the urban Black and Korean communities of the US culminated, in more than a dozen cities, in incidents of protest and violence. Within 15 years, 40 Black-led boycotts of Korean-owned stores occurred, spanning from Los Angeles to Washington D.C., due to altercations between Korean store owners and Black customers. In those same 15 years, local newspapers reported 66 incidents of violence, most of which were shootings, physical assaults, and riots. Much of the violence between the two groups was perpetrated either by African Americans frustrated with socioeconomic inequities, or by Korean American shop owners claiming self defense.

The boycotts were sparked by different triggers. Residents often boycotted Korean merchants when reports of violence between Black customers and Korean store owners occurred, such as with the Red Apple boycotts, started after a Korean American store owner allegedly assaulted a Haitian American woman. Customers also led boycotts because of high prices, while Black business owners led boycotts when prices were too low to compete with. Other boycotts were to protest the sale of more liquor in neighborhoods already oversaturated with liquor outlets, or to protest rude service by Korean store owners.

== Anti-Black racism among Korean Americans ==
The tense relationship between Korean shop owners and African American patrons during the 1980s and 1990s was not only fueled by their difference in socioeconomic status, but also by Korean fear of, and prejudice against, their Black customers. Where Korean American store owners were stereotyped as greedy, selfish, and unassimilable, Korean merchants typecast their African American patrons as loud, rude, and dangerous.

Though the violent altercations between Black and Korean Americans were often portrayed as part of a race war, which concerned only those two groups, some scholars contend that Black-Korean conflict must be viewed as a reconceptualization of white racism. In fact, racist attitudes held by both Korean Americans and African Americans were found to not be novel, but to mirror those of White Americans.

== Korean Americans as a middleman minority ==
Theory surrounding Black-Korean relations in the US, and the particular social position of Korean Americans, has often been informed by the concept that Korean-Americans function as a middleman minority group. The term "middleman minority" has been used by media and scholars alike to denote both the economic privilege and racial minoritization that Korean-Americans experience in the US.

Some scholars argue that the “middleman minority” understanding of Black American and Korean American relations places too much focus on the economic disparities between the two groups, instead emphasizing that Black-Korean friction has been fueled by both a transfusion of White supremacy through media manipulation, and inherent differences in cultural meanings. Other scholars argue that the dominant stereotyping of Korean-Americans as a “middleman minority” in the 1980s and 1990s media also functioned as a catalyst for further racial enmity between Korean-Americans and Black-Americans.

== Black–Korean Alliance ==
The Black Korean Alliance (BKA) was a nonprofit organization established in Los Angeles to help alleviate tensions between Black and Korean Americans after the murder of four Korean shop owners in 1986, functioning to prevent further hostility in their shared communities.

The BKA was composed of five subcommittees, each tasked with tackling one problem between the two groups. These subcommittees were employment, community education and cultural exchange, fund-raising, religious leadership, and economic development. Despite their efforts, the BKA did not fully succeed in reducing hostility between Black and Korean communities, as seen in the 1992 Los Angeles uprising, among other boycotts and civil unrest. The BKA struggled for several reasons, from a lack of financial resources to lack of mutual motivation, to internal disorganization, to miscommunication within their messaging. Ultimately, it did not help to increase employment of Black Americans by Korean Americans, nor did it help create joint economic projects between the two groups. It was ultimately abolished in 1992 after the Los Angeles uprising.

Other organizations like the BKA include Harlem's Korean-African Association for Friendship in 1990 which guided 37 African American pastors on a trip to Korea in October 1991 to foster harmony between the groups. Other groups, like the Korean-American Grocers Association of New York (KAGRONY) and the Korean Produce Association of New York, established annually awarded scholarship funds of $1,000 for Black students.

== See also ==
- History of Koreans in Baltimore, includes African American relations
- Killing of Latasha Harlins, African American girl shot by a Korean American storeowner
- Rooftop Koreans, Los Angeles riots
