= Joyce Karlin Fahey =

American judge

- Born: Joyce Ann Karlin; January 5, 1951 (age 75); Caracas, Venezuela
- Occupations: Lawyer, judge, politician
- Political party: Republican

Joyce Ann Karlin Fahey (born January 5, 1951) is an American lawyer and politician. She served as both a federal prosecutor and a Los Angeles County Superior Court judge. She is known for having sentenced Soon Ja Du, the merchant who killed 15 year old Latasha Harlins with a fatal shot to the back of her head, to only five years' probation and 400 hours of community service, with no jail time. The sentence was widely condemned, including by the LA County District Attorney and black community leaders in Los Angeles, and is regarded as a catalyst for the 1992 Los Angeles riots.

== Early life and education ==
Karlin was born in Caracas, Venezuela. During her childhood, Karlin lived in several countries including Italy, Germany and Argentina. She is fluent in English and Spanish. Her family moved to Chicago. Karlin received a degree from the Loyola University Chicago School of Law in 1974. She is Jewish.

== Career ==
Karlin was employed by defense attorneys in Chicago and Los Angeles. She served as an assistant United States Attorney in Los Angeles. In that role, she prosecuted the case of former Drug Enforcement Administration (DEA) agent Darnell Garcia.

Karlin became a Superior Court judge in 1991 and that year, she presided over the controversial voluntary manslaughter case involving the death of Latasha Harlins. Karlin's light sentencing was seen in contrast to her more severe sentencing of a Glendale man for kicking a dog a week later, and was met with outrage and protest from the African-American community. It is the opinion of historians that the decision fueled the racial unrest the black community was already feeling in the aftermath of the Rodney King beating and possibly contributed to the 1992 Los Angeles riots. The Los Angeles County District Attorney issued a "blanket affidavit policy", that disallowed Karlin from judging felony cases "involving violent crimes." Karlin defended her ruling stating that "The orange juice has nothing to do with anything. A woman was severely beaten and responded to the beating.″ adding that 15 year old Harlins was shot "in the heat of battle".

In 1992, an effort to recall Karlin narrowly failed. Karlin was elected in spring 1992 to California's Superior Court. She received 51% of the vote, defeating four other candidates. In 1997, Karlin retired from her position as a judge. She was later elected to the Manhattan Beach, California city council and in 2002 served a rotation as mayor, per the system used for Manhattan Beach. Since retiring from the bench she has used her husband, Superior Court Judge William F. Fahey's surname.

In 2003, a rival candidate for City Council formally filed a claim of invasion of privacy against Karlin when she obtained the candidate's social security number and used it to subsequently release details of her opponent's education to the public. Superior Court Judge William Willett granted Karlin's motion to dismiss citing California's anti-SLAPP law.
