= Rooftop Koreans =

Faction during the 1992 Los Angeles riots

"Rooftop Koreans" or "Roof Koreans" refers to Korean American business owners residing in Koreatown during the 1992 Los Angeles riots who armed themselves with firearms, and took to the rooftops of local businesses to defend them. The imagery of armed shopkeepers became emblematic among Korean Americans. After the murder of George Floyd in May 2020, and subsequent riots and protests the phenomenon was co-opted as a meme among gun rights advocates, conservatives, and critics of the Black Lives Matter as an example of the necessity of self-defense in the absence of state protection and American values demonstrated by immigrants.

Despite later mythologization, no looters were shot or killed by "Rooftop Koreans" and some Korean Americans who participated in defense during the riot have said they felt excluded from American society by the event. Some commentators on the meme have noted that beyond its use advocating for the second amendment it has also been used by white supremacists to advocate and justify violence against Black people.

== Background ==
The unrest in Los Angeles was sparked by the acquittal of four Los Angeles Police Department officers in the beating of Rodney King and resulted in rioting and looting, along with widespread violence and arson throughout the city. Controversially, local police instead set up a defensive perimeter around the upper-class Beverly Hills and West Hollywood cities, cutting off Koreatown and abandoning other minority and low-income communities, leaving the Koreatown community to mostly fend for themselves.

=== Tensions between Korean and African Americans ===
Tensions had existed between the Korean and African American communities in Los Angeles. According to some Koreans, there was a feeling among the Black community that Koreans were taking from the community, via the operation of small businesses in the area, which led to racial resentment.

Previous violent incidents which contributed to the tensions include the killing of Latasha Harlins in 1991, in which an African American teenager was fatally shot by a Korean American convenience store owner, Soon Ja Du. Du was tried, convicted, and given ten years in prison. However, the sentence was suspended, and she was instead placed on five years' probation with 400 hours of community service and payment of $500 restitution, as well as Harlins' funeral costs. The sentencing was widely regarded as extremely light, with a failed appeal reportedly contributing to the 1992 Los Angeles riots.

== Events ==
The intersection of 5th Street and Western Avenue served as a flashpoint, where the California Market (also called Gaju or Kaju) Korean grocery store was a major point of conflict. Other locations that were defended by citizens with firearms, included 8th and Oxford, as well as Western and Third Street. The Los Angeles Times stated there were multiple people on the roof of the grocery with "shotguns and automatic weapons". Ebony magazine noted the use of "rifles and handguns."

Because South Korea had at the time a thirty-month mandatory military service for males, it was noted that many Korean immigrants had experience with handling firearms. Additionally, due to men around their 30s to 60s not being so keen on getting a US citizenship, with the exception being a few younger men in their 20s which were still a minority even men in their 20s, many of them were still legally reservists of whatever branch of the Armed Forces, in this case a large Marine Corps and Army reservist presence.

The actions of the "rooftop Koreans" sparked debates about gun control and vigilantism, while simultaneously spurring praise for the residents' bravery and resourcefulness. Edward Jae Song Lee, a Korean American, was shot and killed mistakenly by his peers.

Police were on "tactical alert", thus not responding to any calls from citizens. Order was not restored until President Bush invoked the Insurrection Act (declaring it an insurrection) deploying 15,000 troops. Order was restored almost immediately.

=== Use of radio stations ===
Radio Korea shut off all regular programming and instead aired numerous calls from business owners requesting help. While the station did not formally organize armed groups, its broadcasts facilitated informal coordination among community members. After the riots concluded on 4 May 1992, Radio Korea entered a two-month “recovery period.” At Radio Korea’s headquarters, accountants assisted people with their insurance claims, and the station also helped set up a food bank at a local church.

== Legacy ==
In the 21st century, it has been the subject of social media memes, contributing to tensions between East Asian and African American communities, especially in the 2014 Ferguson unrest, the emergence of Black Lives Matter, the murder of George Floyd and the increased racial tensions around Stop Asian Hate.

During the June 2025 Los Angeles protests, Donald Trump Jr., son of United States president Donald Trump, tweeted a photo captioned "Make Rooftop Koreans Great Again!" in reference to rioting and looting that occurred during the event. The Korean American Federation of Los Angeles repudiated Trump Jr's tweet, describing it as "mocking the current unrest" and urging that "the past trauma of the Korean people be never, ever exploited for any purpose." Hyungwon Kang, who shot the photograph while reporting on the 1992 riots, stated that Trump Jr. was "using the photo out of context," later consulting a lawyer when Trump Jr. proved unresponsive to requests to take down the post.

== See also ==
- African American–Korean American relations
- Model Minority
- Black Korea
