= Killing of Latasha Harlins =

1991 killing of a Black teenager by a Korean store owner

Latasha Harlins
- Born: January 1, 1976; East St. Louis, Illinois, U.S.
- Died: March 16, 1991 (aged 15); Vermont Vista, Los Angeles, California, U.S.
- Cause of death: Manslaughter (gunshot wound)
- Other name: Tasha
- Education: Westchester High School

Latasha Harlins (January 1, 1976 – March 16, 1991) was a 15-year-old African-American teenager who was fatally shot in the Vermont Vista neighborhood of Los Angeles, California, by Soon Ja Du, a Korean-American store owner.

Harlins entered Du's store, Empire Liquor Market, to purchase an individual-sized bottle of orange juice. As Harlins approached the register, Du accused her of attempting to shoplift, which Harlins denied. Du lunged across the counter and grabbed Harlins by her open sweater, pulling her inward. A physical struggle ensued with surveillance video showing that Harlins struck Du to free herself from Du's grip. Afterward Du threw a nearby stool at Harlins who then returned the orange juice bottle to the counter. As Harlins turned and walked toward the exit, Du retrieved a .38-caliber revolver and shot Harlins in the back of the head, killing her instantly.

Following the shooting, the store's security camera footage was leaked to the press and broadcast across local television news, sparking public outrage. The Los Angeles Police Department (LAPD) held a press conference and Du was arrested. She was subsequently released on $250,000 bail. Du maintained that she was the victim in the incident and that the homicide was justified.

A grand jury formally indicted Du on a charge of first-degree murder, which carried a maximum sentence of 30 years to life in prison. The trial jury ultimately found Du guilty of voluntary manslaughter. Los Angeles County Superior Court Judge Joyce Karlin sentenced Du to a suspended 10-year sentence, 5 years of probation, 400 hours of community service, a $500 fine, and restitution of Harlins' funeral costs to her family.

The sentencing was widely regarded as extremely light and directly contributed to the racial tensions that fueled the 1992 Los Angeles riots. The killing of Harlins occurred 13 days after the release of the videotaped police beating of motorist Rodney King.

== Life ==
Latasha Lavon Harlins was born January 1, 1976, in East St. Louis, Illinois, to Crystal Harlins and Sylvester "Vester" Acoff Sr. She was the eldest of three children, followed by a brother, Vester Acoff Jr. (born in 1979), and a sister, Christina (born in 1981).

In 1981 when Harlins was 5 years old, the family relocated from Illinois to California and settled in South Central Los Angeles. Following the move, Acoff Sr. secured employment at a local steel foundry, while Crystal worked as a waitress and studied during the day to obtain a real estate license. Her parents' relationship was marked by severe domestic instability, leading to their permanent separation in 1983.

On November 27, 1985 when Harlins was nine-years-old, her mother, Crystal Harlins was fatally shot in the chest during an argument at a local nightclub by Cora Mae Anderson. Appellate court records show that the women were acquaintances and had known each other several months prior to the incident. Anderson was convicted of voluntary manslaughter and sentenced to serve five years in prison.

Following the loss of her mother, Acoff Sr. permanently left the household and moved out of state. Harlins and her siblings were taken in and raised by their maternal grandmother, Ruth Harlins, a county public social services clerk originally from Tuscaloosa, Alabama, who cared for the children with a disciplined but gentle hand. According to a profile published in the Los Angeles Times, Harlins internalized much of her grief but would quietly cry whenever she passed the Inglewood Park Cemetery on Manchester Boulevard, which reminded her of her mother, even though she was not buried there.

Despite her personal hardships, Harlins excelled academically and socially. Known by neighborhood friends for her bangs and her smile, she was affectionately nicknamed "Lil' Gizmo." In middle school, she ran track and was a consistent honor roll student. She regularly spent her afternoons at the Algin Sutton Recreation Center and took on a protective role for younger kids, earning her the reputation of the "neighborhood big sister." By 1991, Harlins was a ninth-grade student attending Westchester High School, where she played basketball.

Harlins had set explicit goals to attend the University of Southern California (USC) and to become a lawyer. Reflecting on her legacy, her sister, Dr. Christina Rogers, stated in a later interview with StoryCorps that Harlins was so popular in South Central that she initially believed her sister was a celebrity, serving as a powerful motivational influence during their short time together. Her brother, Vester Jr. added that his favorite childhood memories involved putting on talent shows with his sisters in the family living room.

== Death ==
Security camera footage of the killing

=== Soon Ja Du and Empire Liquor Market ===
Soon Ja Du was born in North Chungcheong Province, South Korea, as the oldest daughter of upper-class parents. While attending college, she married Hong Ki "Billy" Du, a Taekwondo instructor who trained U.S. military forces stationed in South Korea. Together, the couple had three children. In 1976, seeking to escape a highly competitive Korean school system, the family immigrated to the United States and settled in Inglewood, California.

For her first years in the United States, Du worked in a garment factory while her husband secured a job as a repairman. In 1981, using a small business loan, the family purchased their first convenience market in San Fernando. Seeking higher profits, they later sold that business to operate a similar store in Newhall. In 1989, the family purchased the Empire Liquor Market for $380,000. As a deaconess of a conservative Presbyterian church, Du had expressed her discomfort with earning a living by selling liquor.

The Empire Liquor Market was located at the intersection of West 91st Street and South Figueroa Street, in the Vermont Vista neighborhood of Los Angeles.Although normally staffed by her husband and her son, Joseph, Soon Ja Du worked occasional weekend mornings to avoid busier periods.

The market developed a hostile reputation within the neighborhood. Harlins’ grandmother warned her and her other grandchildren not to shop at the Du family's store. Latasha’s uncle, Richard Harlins briefly worked at the store but cited what he characterized as hostile and suspicious treatment towards the local clientele and its Black employees and his reason for his resignation. Some of the local residents chose to avoid shopping at the market.

On the morning of Saturday, March 16, 1991, Soon Ja Du was working behind the counter while her husband slept outside in a delivery van parked in front of the store. The store was a short walk from Harlins home. Shortly before 10:00 a.m., Harlins entered the market and placed a $1.79 bottle of orange juice in an outside pocket of her backpack. Du concluded that Harlins was attempting to shoplift and failed to notice the $2.00 cash Harlins held openly in her hand. Du later told police that she asked Harlins if she intended to pay, to which Harlins had replied "What orange juice?" However, two child eyewitnesses disputed this, testifying at trial that Du immediately accused Harlins of stealing, and that Harlins had stated she intended to pay.

Based in part to their analysis of the store’s overhead security camera's videotape, LAPD investigators determined that Harlins showed no intent to steal and approached the counter with money in hand. The videotape captured Soon Ja Du grabbing Harlins by her sweater, pulling her into the counter, seizing her backpack. A struggle ensued and Harlins struck Du, knocking Du back, releasing Harlins' sweater. After Harlins backed away, Du hurled a stool at her. Harlins is seen retrieving the orange juice bottle off the ground and placing it on the counter with Du knocking it away. Harlins remained in front of the counter for several seconds, then turned to leave. Du reached under the counter, withdrew a .38-caliber revolver from its holster, and fired a single shot from a distance of approximately three feet (one meter). The bullet struck Harlins in the back of the head, killing her instantly. The publicly released footage ended shortly thereafter. According to police statements, Du's husband Billy heard gunfire and rushed into the store to find Harlins dead on the floor. Du fainted and her husband dialed 9-1-1 to report an attempted robbery.

== Investigation ==
When police arrived at the scene, Soon Ja Du complained of a head injury and was transported to Martin Luther King Jr./Drew Medical Center where she was treated for minor, superficial injuries. Authorities declined to take her into custody at the hospital while details remained sketchy.

On March 17, the Los Angeles Times reported the initial police account. Police Detective Jeff Alvarado stated that the store owner alleged that a struggle ensued after the teenager tried to shoplift a bottle of orange juice. However, Alvarado noted that early details indicated the girl had given the juice back and was attempting to walk away when she was shot in the back of the head. Soon Ja Du was officially booked on suspicion of murder hours later once investigators reviewed the physical evidence.

On March 18, LAPD Commander Michael J. Bostic held a press conference to clarify the facts of the incident, stated that the videotape showed Harlins had no intent to steal, had money openly in her hand, and had placed the juice back on the counter before turning to leave, stating that, "There was no attempt at shoplifting. There was no robbery. There was no crime at all," and characterized the shooting as "just a business dispute" with no immediate racial overtones. Latasha's aunt, Ahneva Harlins, contended that "My niece was shot in cold blood." at the same press conference

== Media coverage and community response ==
Initial news coverage of the shooting relied heavily on early police and merchant accounts. On March 17, the day after the shooting, initial mainstream reports focused primarily on the shoplifting allegations made by the store owners. Following the release of the security camera footage, mainstream reporting and defense advocacy shifted the focus toward the broader crime rates of suffered by business owners in the South Central area.

Joseph Du, the 30-year-old son of Soon Ja Du, publicly asserted that the shooting was an accident, and maintained that his mother genuinely believed Harlins was trying to steal the juice and rob the register. While explaining that their store was located in a "gang-controlled area," Joseph Du added, "What are we going to do? We have two guns in the store for defense reasons." He contended that authorities were using his mother as a "scapegoat" to placate the Black community during the intense public outcry surrounding the LAPD beating of Rodney King, which had occurred just two weeks prior.

By March 20, local residents interviewed by the Los Angeles Times described a history of friction at the Empire Liquor Market, reporting that some neighbors had stopped patronizing the business due to frequent verbal insults and shoplifting accusations by the owners.

On March 29, the Los Angeles Times published letters from local community members illustrating divergent viewpoints. A letter signed by 234 of Harlins's classmates questioned whether her shooting was motivated by "racial intolerance," issues of gun control, or a lack of institutional concern regarding homicides in the area.

Conversely, local LAPD Officer G. Holmstrom expressed concern over characterizations of the event as purely racially motivated. He wrote that the Du family had been repeatedly threatened and "terrorized" by local gang members, forcing the temporary closure of the store the previous month. Holmstrom added that while three individuals were in custody, other gang members had threatened the Du family ahead of Joseph Du's scheduled court testimony. Holmstrom described Soon Ja Du as being in a "very jittery" mental state at the time of the shooting, though clarified that this "did not excuse what she did to Latasha."

During the pre-trial phase, defense advocates and merchant associations heavily publicized the history of armed robberies, violent crime, and structural challenges faced by South Central merchants, presenting these long-standing neighborhood issues as the immediate context for the incident. Media coverage featured detailed accounts of the psychological stress experienced by the merchant class, and highlighted the prior crime incident involving Soon Ja Du’s son, framing the family's history of factory labor as a supporting narrative of strong work ethic. This reporting contrasted with the specific logistics of the case established during the investigation; while coverage centered heavily on the high crime rates surrounding the South Central storefront, Soon Ja Du herself primarily worked at a separate store location in Santa Clarita. On August 17, 1991, a small fire occurred at the Empire Liquor Market. The incident was widely condemned by Black church leaders and activists.

== Court proceedings ==
=== Trial ===
On September 30, 1991, Soon Ja Du's jury trial began in Los Angeles Superior Court and concluded on October 11, 1991.

Thirteen-year-old Lakeshia Combs and her nine-year-old brother, Ismail Ali, testified at trial that Latasha approached the counter holding cash in her hand and that Soon Ja Du called Harlins a "bitch", accused her of attempting to steal the orange juice, which prompted Harlins to state that she intended to pay for it. David Butler, a ballistics expert with the LAPD, testified that the weapon involved had undergone modifications that drastically decreased the amount of pressure required to pull the trigger and also noted that the revolver's safety features were malfunctioning.

Joseph Du, testified that the family store was located in a high-crime area, and had experienced as many as 40 shoplifting incidents per week. The recording of Billy Du's 9-1-1 call was played for the jury and revealed that he informed the operator that a Black teenager had attempted to rob the store by reaching into the cash register. Billy Du had purchased the .38-caliber revolver used in the killing from an acquaintance for personal safety in 1981. He stated that he never operated the firearm nor had he ever instructed his wife on how to operate it. The handgun had been relocated to the Empire Market in 1990 after it was recovered by local police, having been stolen in 1988 during a robbery at their Saugus location in Santa Clarita.

Soon Ja Du testified on her own behalf, and confirmed that she usually worked at their Saugus location. She explained that, in her experience, shoplifters would take merchandise and "place it inside the bra or anyplace where the owner would not notice," and then would approach the counter to buy some small items before leaving. Du recalled that she witnessed Harlins enter the store, take a bottle of orange juice from the refrigerator, place it in her backpack, and proceed to the counter. Acknowledging that the bottle was visible inside the backpack, Du was suspicious and expected that if Harlins intended to pay for the item, she would have instead had the bottle in her hand. Du relayed that Latasha had threatened to kill her and that she believed if she were hit one more time, she would die. Du added that she had never held a gun before, did not know how it worked, did not remember firing the gun, and did not intend to kill Harlins. Her statements contradicted the store's security camera footage which had been viewed by the jury.

Following the conclusion of trial testimony, the court granted the defense's motion to dismiss the first-degree murder charge. The judge then instructed the jury on second-degree murder, involuntary manslaughter, and two distinct theories of voluntary manslaughter: sudden quarrel or heat of passion, and an honest but unreasonable belief in the need for self-defense.

==== Conviction ====
On November 15, 1991, the jury found Soon Ja Du, guilty of voluntary manslaughter and also that the special allegations that she personally used a firearm under California Penal Code sections 1203.06, subdivision (a)(1) and 12022.5 applied. Prosecutors later stated that the voluntary manslaughter conviction meant that the jury found that she possessed the intent to kill and that the slaying was unlawful, meaning it was neither justifiable nor excusable. Consequently, the jury rejected the defense claims that the shooting was unintentional and that she had acted in self-defense. In the state of California, this conviction was punishable by imprisonment in the state prison for three, six, or eleven years.

==== Pre-sentencing evaluation and sentencing ====
Following her conviction, a Los Angeles County probation officer conducted a presentence investigation report to review Soon Ja Du's background. The evaluation focused intensively on her son's legal conflicts with members of the Main Street Crips, to describe the neighborhood's volatility, framing the store's environment as an active war zone.

The evaluating probation officer determined that Du posed no risk of reoffending if spared from serving time in prison, noting she was not inherently prone to violence. However, the officer observed that while Du expressed sympathy for the victim and her relatives, her regret seemed heavily focused on the devastation the event brought upon her own household.

The trial court ultimately disagreed with the report, with Judge Joyce Karlin stating that in her opinion, Du’s struggle to communicate her grief to the probation officer stemmed from a language and cultural barrier rather than a lack of genuine sorrow. Judge Karlin sentenced Du to five years of probation, 10 years of suspended prison, 400 hours of community service, and payment of a $500 fine and Harlins's funeral costs. No jail time was imposed as a condition of the probation granted. Judge Karlin stated, "Did Mrs. Du react inappropriately? Absolutely. But was that reaction understandable? I think that it was." Karlin added, "this is not a time for revenge... and no matter what sentence this court imposes Mrs. Du will be punished every day for the rest of her life." The court also stated that Du shot Harlins under extreme provocation and duress and deemed that it was unlikely that Du would ever commit a serious crime again. Karlin stated that Du's capacity to act rationally in the situation was undermined by trauma from past robberies.

==== Response ====
The sentence was highly criticized. Maxine Waters, United States Representative for the 29th District that included the South Central neighborhood stated that the sentence "implied that black lives are worth less than others" while the President of the Los Angeles chapter of the NAACP, Joseph H. Duff stated that the sentence was "a sign of institutional racism at work."

District Attorney Ira Reiner instructed his deputies to bar Judge Karlin from presiding over future cases brought by his office, invoking a California state law that allows for the removal of a judge for any reason. Reiner asserted to The New York Times that "This was such a stunning miscarriage of justice that Judge Karlin cannot continue to hear criminal cases with any public credibility,".

Judge Karlin became the target of protests held at the Compton courthouse and outside Karlin's home. Protesters noted that a week after the killing, a Glendale man received a more severe sentence than Du for kicking a dog. She was re-elected to the Superior Court bench by a reduced margin from previous elections. On January 24, 1992, it was announced that Karlin was being transferred to the Juvenile Dependency Court, a request Karlin had made prior to presiding over the case, citing that she wanted more time to devote to her family.

==== Appeal ====
Reiner, and Deputy District Attorneys, Harry B. Sondheim, George G. Size, Glenn R. Britton challenged Superior Court's sentencing by petitioning California Courts of Appeals's Second Appellate District in People v. Superior Court (Du) (1992). They argued that Du was ineligible for probation since the California penal code, prohibited probation in cases involving firearms "except in unusual cases where the interests of justice would best be served if the person is granted probation." Their petition was denied on April 21, 1992 by a panel of three judges.

In his opinion, Associate Justice Herbert Louis Ashby wrote that "A trial court has broad discretion in determining whether or not to grant probation. In reviewing that determination it is not our function to substitute our judgment for that of the trial court. Our function is to determine whether the trial court's order granting probation is arbitrary or capricious or exceeds the bounds of reason considering all the facts and circumstances. Utilizing this standard of review, we conclude that the respondent court's determination was not an abuse of discretion. Accordingly, we deny the petition." Justice Orville A. Boren and Justice Margaret Grignon agreed.

==== Civil Lawsuit ====
In April 1991, Harlins' siblings filed a civil lawsuit against Soon Ja Du and Billy Hong Ki Du alleging wrongful death, intentional killing and negligent killing. On July 28, 1992, Los Angeles Superior County Court Judge Gary Klauser awarded Harlins' estate $300,000, an amount that had been mutually agreed under settlement and was paid by the Du's insurance company. Judge Klauser ruled that settlement would be equally distributed between Harlins' two siblings and that her father, Vestor Acoff was excluded from receiving any of the proceeds stating that "The father apparently left the state in 1985, without even saying goodbye to his daughter," adding that "'There appears to be a lack of grief on the part of the father in that he did not even attend the child's funeral."

== Aftermath ==
=== Effect on Black and Korean relations ===
The relationship between the Black and Korean store owners in Los Angeles, which had already been poor, deteriorated rapidly after the death of Harlins and the subsequent sentencing of Soon Ja Du.

Korean immigrant shop-owners had been a growing presence in the predominantly Black communities since the 1970s. Korean immigrants bought their storefronts in Black neighborhoods such as South Los Angeles because the real estate was significantly cheaper than other neighborhoods. Since then, they had been a target of anger from both Black shop-owners and Black customers, with incompatible claims that Korean shop-owners "undercut prices" by the shop-owners and that they overcharged customers.

In 1984, seven years before Harlins was shot, an editorial was posted in a Black community newspaper urging a boycott of Korean stores, saying that any Black person who went to their stores was a "traitor", and saying "The real question is, why was my brother's brains blown out fighting for those Koreans?" in reference to the Korean War. Despite intervention from leaders of both communities, the aftermath of the killing was characterized by boycotts, tense debate, bitterness, Molotov cocktails, and more convenience store murders.

Tensions only continued to mount, particularly after police officers were found not guilty of beating Rodney King. These events were considered factors in deadly and destructive riots which began on April 29, 1992, and continued through May 4, 1992. Many of the targets of looting and destruction were Korean stores; more than two thousand Korean stores were burned or looted. Though these ethnic tensions have not resulted in wide-scale violence since 1992, the relationship between Koreans and the Black community was still strained as of 1996. The 21st century has seen improved relations between the two communities, as a younger generation of Korean-American Los Angeles residents showed up in great numbers—in some cases organizing protests—to support the Black Lives Matter movement during the summer of 2020.

==== Los Angeles riots in 1992 ====
The killing of Harlins was one of many events in Los Angeles that may have led to the riots in 1992. In the eyes of many in the Black community, it was a grave injustice that Soon Ja Du did not receive any jail time for her crime. While the jury convicted Du of manslaughter, an offense that is punishable by imprisonment in the state prison for three, six, or eleven years, the judge, Joyce Karlin, commuted her sentence to five years of probation, 10 years of suspended prison, 400 hours of community service, and payment of a $500 fine and Harlins' funeral costs. This angered many in the Black community. After the verdict in Rodney King's case was delivered, massive riots ensued in Los Angeles.

The incident and reduced sentencing by the court exacerbated the existing tensions between African-American residents and Korean-American merchants in South Central Los Angeles. Those tensions were later interpreted by some members of the public and activists as being one of the catalysts for the 1992 Los Angeles riots. The Los Angeles mayor's office estimated that 65 percent of all businesses vandalized during the riots were Korean-owned.

During the 1992 riots, Du's store was looted and burned down; it never reopened. The property later became a market under different ownership.

==== Judge Joyce Karlin Fahey ====
After the Los Angeles Times endorsed one of her opponents in her re-election campaign, Karlin wrote a letter to the newspaper, saying "[I]f judges have to look over their shoulders as they decide a case; if they have to test the political winds in order to arrive at a politically correct verdict—then the judicial system and the freedoms it guarantees will be destroyed." The Harlins family held vigils outside the Du residence every year on the anniversary of her sentencing.

Denise Harlins interrupted an awards ceremony at the Biltmore Hotel for Du defense attorney Charles Lloyd. Karlin and Du's son also attended that ceremony. "All you people sitting, applauding over a child killer," Harlins yelled. "Latasha was defenseless. She didn't do nothing!" After Denise Harlins was removed from the ballroom, Karlin gave a speech, stating "There are those in the community who demand that we define justice by what is politically correct. I think that we must unanimously reject such demands ... What's politically correct today may not be politically correct tomorrow or the next day. But what is justice today is justice always. ... I for one am sick and tired of less than five percent of this community trying to tell the rest of us what to do, what to think, and what to say."

Karlin resigned from the bench in 1997. Upon hearing of retirement, Denise Harlins stated, "I'm glad to hear that she's removed herself from the bench and that she's retired. But she didn't belong [on the bench] anyway." Since retiring from the bench Karlin has used her husband's surname Fahey.

==== Memorials ====
In 1998, the California State Assembly named April 29 as Latasha Harlins Day.

In early 2021, a mural honoring Harlins was dedicated at the Algin Sutton Recreation Center. The mural was created by visual artist Victoria Cassinova.

== In popular culture ==
=== In music ===
In 1993, hip hop artist Tupac Shakur released a song titled "Keep Ya Head Up", which was dedicated to Harlins. He made frequent mention of her in later songs, including in tracks like "Something 2 Die 4 (Interlude)" ("Latasha Harlins, remember that name... 'Cause a bottle of juice is not something to die for"), "Thugz Mansion" ("Little Latasha, sho' grown/Tell the lady in the liquor store that she's forgiven/So come home"), "I Wonder If Heaven Got a Ghetto" ("Tell me what's a black life worth/A bottle of juice is no excuse, the truth hurts/And even when you take the shit/Move counties get a lawyer, you can shake the shit/Ask Rodney, Latasha, and many more"), "White Mans World" ("Rest in Peace to Latasha, Little Yummy, and Kato"), "Hellrazor" ("Dear Lord if ya hear me, tell me why/Little girl like Latasha, had to die") and "N.I.G.G.A." ("Korean motherfuckers was crooked/So niggas had to burn and loot 'em [...] Lickin' off shots for Latasha, that's proper").

Rapper Ice Cube composed a song about the incident for his album Death Certificate titled "Black Korea".

Singer-songwriter Gabriel Kahane composed "Empire Liquor Mart (9127 S. Figueroa St.)" for the album The Ambassador in 2014, which tells the story of Harlins' life and the event that transpired.

Haitian-American rapper Mach-Hommy released the song "Soon Jah Due" (featuring Earl Sweatshirt) on his 2020 album Mach's Hard Lemonade. The song discusses police brutality, with its title being a play on Soon Ja Du's name.

==== In film and television ====
The short documentary film A Love Song for Latasha (2019) gives some biographical background Harlins' life, drawing on memories from her cousin and her best friend. Directed by Sophia Nahli Allison, it was nominated for an Academy Award for Best Documentary Short Subject at the 93rd Academy Awards in 2021.

== See also ==
- African American–Korean American relations
- Killing of Cyrus Carmack-Belton
- Rooftop Koreans
