= A Love Song for Latasha =

2019 documentary film by Sophia Nahli Allison

- Film poster
- Directed by: Sophia Nahli Allison
- Produced by: Fam Udeorji; Sophia Nahli Allison
- Starring: Tybie O'Bard; Shinese Harlins; Zoe Flint; Nnenna Brown; Londyn Sharp; Marley Cortez; Raigan Alex
- Cinematography: Sophia Nahli Allison
- Edited by: Sophia Nahli Allison
- Music by: Minna Choi
- Production company: Black Dreams LLC
- Distributed by: Netflix
- Release dates: April 2019 (Tribeca); September 21, 2020
- Running time: 19 minutes
- Country: United States
- Language: English

A Love Song for Latasha is a 2019 American biographical documentary short film directed by Sophia Nahli Allison. Drawing on memories from the subject's cousin and best friend, the film reimagines the life of Latasha Harlins, a Black Los Angeles girl shot and killed by a convenience store owner in 1991. It was nominated for Best Documentary Short Film at the 93rd Academy Awards.

== Production ==
Allison spent two years making A Love Song for Latasha, serving as director, cinematographer, editor and producer. She originally pitched it to a documentary organization she worked for, given the approaching 25th anniversary of Latasha Harlins' 1991 death and the 1992 uprising it fueled. Allison wanted to create a piece restoring the memory of Harlins' life and death to their significance in those events, which are often described only as the Rodney King riots. (Harlins was shot to death by a convenience store owner only days after the police beating of King.) But the organization's indifference and incomprehension of the subject's significance prompted a realization for Allison that "I could no longer work within institutions that don't validate the importance of my existence. If they don't validate the existence of other Black women and girls then they have no right to work with me." Instead she worked closely with Harlins' friends, developing a depiction of their childhoods and South Central Los Angeles. Alice Walker and Saidiya Hartman were influences in Allison's approach to creating a missing archive in the absence of home videos or other archival footage of Harlins.

== Summary ==
A Love Song for Latasha, reimagines the life of Latasha Harlins, a Black girl shot by a convenience store owner in Los Angeles 1991, fueling the 1992 uprising. At the time, security camera footage of Harlins' death was broadcast widely on television news, but Allison's work does not include it. Instead, Jude Dry wrote in IndieWire, the 19-minute film is "bursting with sun-kissed sidewalks and faded basketball courts, clean line animation and radiant Black girls posed gracefully, like young queens." The day of the shooting is depicted in animation, intercut with VHS tape static, to heighten the sense of memory despite the lack of any home movies of Harlins.

The film reimagines narrative of Harlins through intimate memories shared by her cousin Shinese Harlins and best friend Tybie O'Bard. This documentary focuses on how she experienced the society and what dreams and hopes she developed rather than focusing on her death.

== Release ==
The film premiered at the Tribecca Film Festival and screened at the 2020 Sundance Film Festival. Ava DuVernay programmed the documentary as part of Array 360, and it was then picked up by Netflix. The film was released on Netflix on September 21, 2020.

== Reception ==
The documentary short received strongly favorable reviews. At IndieWire, Dry called it a "bold and imaginative take on a vital subject" and "a strong contender for awards consideration." In Esquire, Gabrielle Bruney called it a "stirring portrait". In TheGrio, Cortney Wills described A Love Song as "a mesmerizing piece of work that takes an unconventional route to storytelling."

== Accolades ==
- Academy Award for Best Documentary Short Subject nomination
- Cinema Eye Honors Award 2021: Outstanding Achievement in Nonfiction Short Filmmaking
- AFI Fest 2020: Grand Jury Prize for Best Documentary Short
