= List of incidents and protests of the United States racial unrest =

This is a list of protests and unrest in the United States between 2020 and 2023 against systemic racism towards black people in the United States, such as in the form of police violence. Following the murder of George Floyd, unrest broke out in the Minneapolis–Saint Paul area on May 26, 2020, and quickly spread across the country and the world. Further unrest quickly spread throughout the United States, sometimes including rioting, looting, and arson. By early June, at least 200 American cities had imposed curfews, while more than 30 states and Washington, D.C. had activated over 62,000 National Guard personnel into unrest. By the end of June, at least 14,000 people had been arrested at protests.

Polls have estimated that between 15 million and 26 million people have participated at some point in the demonstrations in the United States, making them the largest protests in United States history. It was also estimated that between May 26 and August 22, around 93% of protests were "peaceful and nondestructive". However, arson, vandalism, and looting during the George Floyd protests alone caused approximately $1–2 billion in damages nationally, the highest recorded damage from civil disorder in U.S. history, and surpassing the record set during the 1992 Los Angeles riots. In protests that involved violence, violence was variously instigated by protesters, counter-protesters, or police, and police sometimes escalated confrontations.

== 2020 ==
=== Dreasjon Reed and McHale Rose protests, May 6–November 2020 ===
On May 6, Dreasjon Reed was shot and killed by an Indianapolis Metropolitan Police Department officer; Reed was livestreaming during the incident and his phone captured a second officer remark "I think it's going to be a closed casket, homie." Demonstrations over his killing erupted at the site that afternoon and continued into the night.

Hours later, McHale Rose was shot and killed by four IMPD officers just three miles away. In a third incident that same night, an IMPD officer hit and killed a pregnant woman with his police cruiser. Hundreds of people gathered at the site of Reed's killing the next day. In November, a grand jury decided not to indict the officer who killed Reed.

=== Ahmaud Arbery protests, May 8, 2020 ===
On February 23, Ahmaud Arbery was murdered in Brunswick, Georgia. Protests ensued in early May after a video surfaced that captured his shooting.

=== NFAC protests, May 12, 2020 ===
Armed members of the Not Fucking Around Coalition (NFAC) have demonstrated in separate protests across the US, making their first appearance on May 12. On July 4, 100 to 200 NFAC members marched through Stone Mountain Park near Atlanta, Georgia, calling for the removal of the Confederate monument. On July 25, more than 300 members were gathered in Louisville, Kentucky, to protest the lack of action against the officers responsible for the March shooting of Breonna Taylor. On October 3, over 400 members of the NFAC along with over 200 other armed protesters marched in downtown Lafayette, Louisiana.

=== Breonna Taylor protests, May 26, 2020–August 4, 2022; Jury verdict protests, September 23, 2020 ===
On March 13, Breonna Taylor was shot and killed. Demonstrations over her death began on May 26, 2020, and lasted into August. One person was shot and killed during the protests.

Protest erupted again on September 23, the night after the grand jury verdict was announced, protesters gathered in the Jefferson Square Park area of Louisville, as well as many other cities in the United States, including Los Angeles, Dallas, Minneapolis, New York, Chicago, Seattle. In Louisville, two LMPD officers were shot during the protest and one suspect was kept in custody.

=== George Floyd protests, (National) May 26, 2020–May 26, 2021; (Minneapolis–Saint Paul) May 26, 2020–May 2, 2023 ===
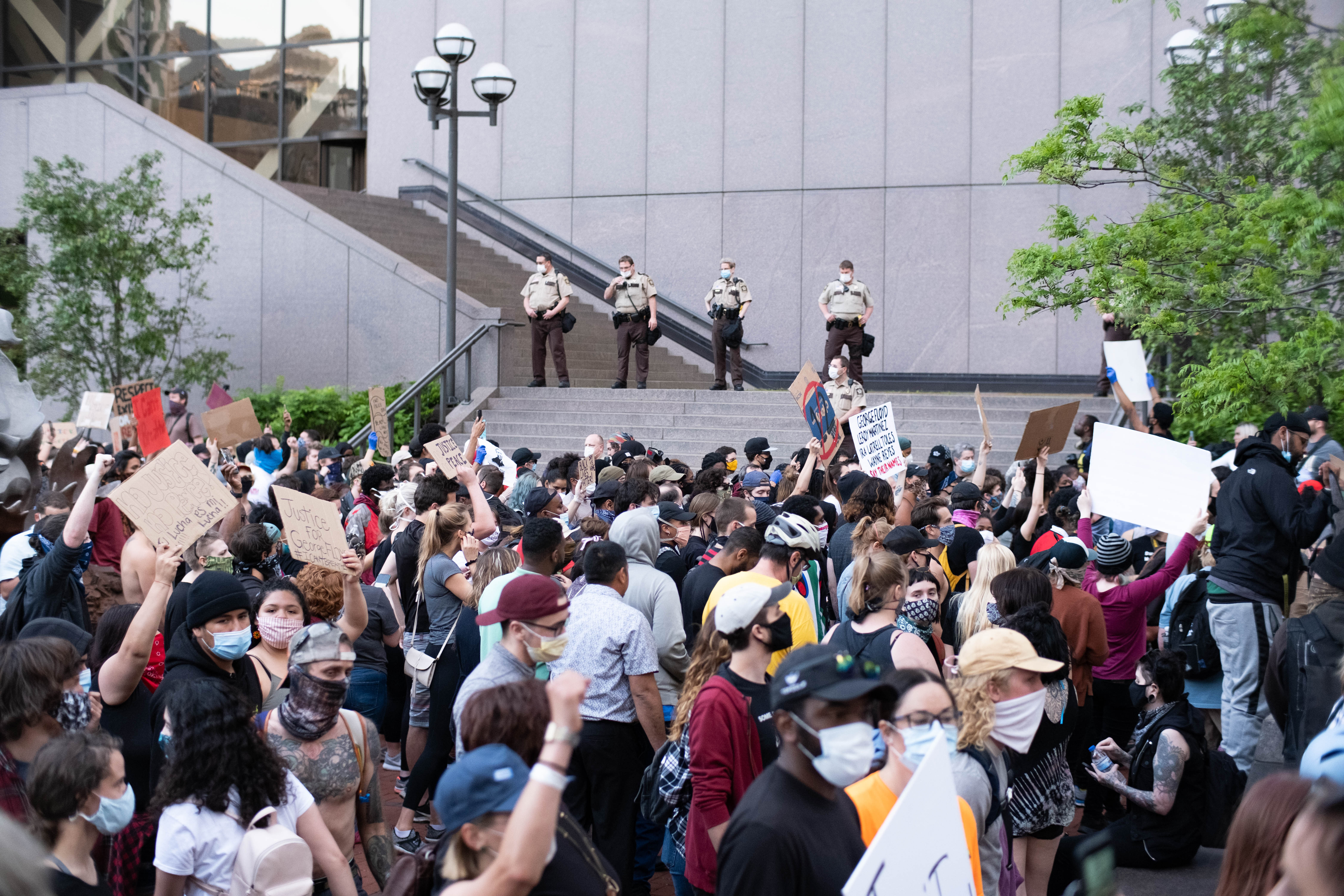
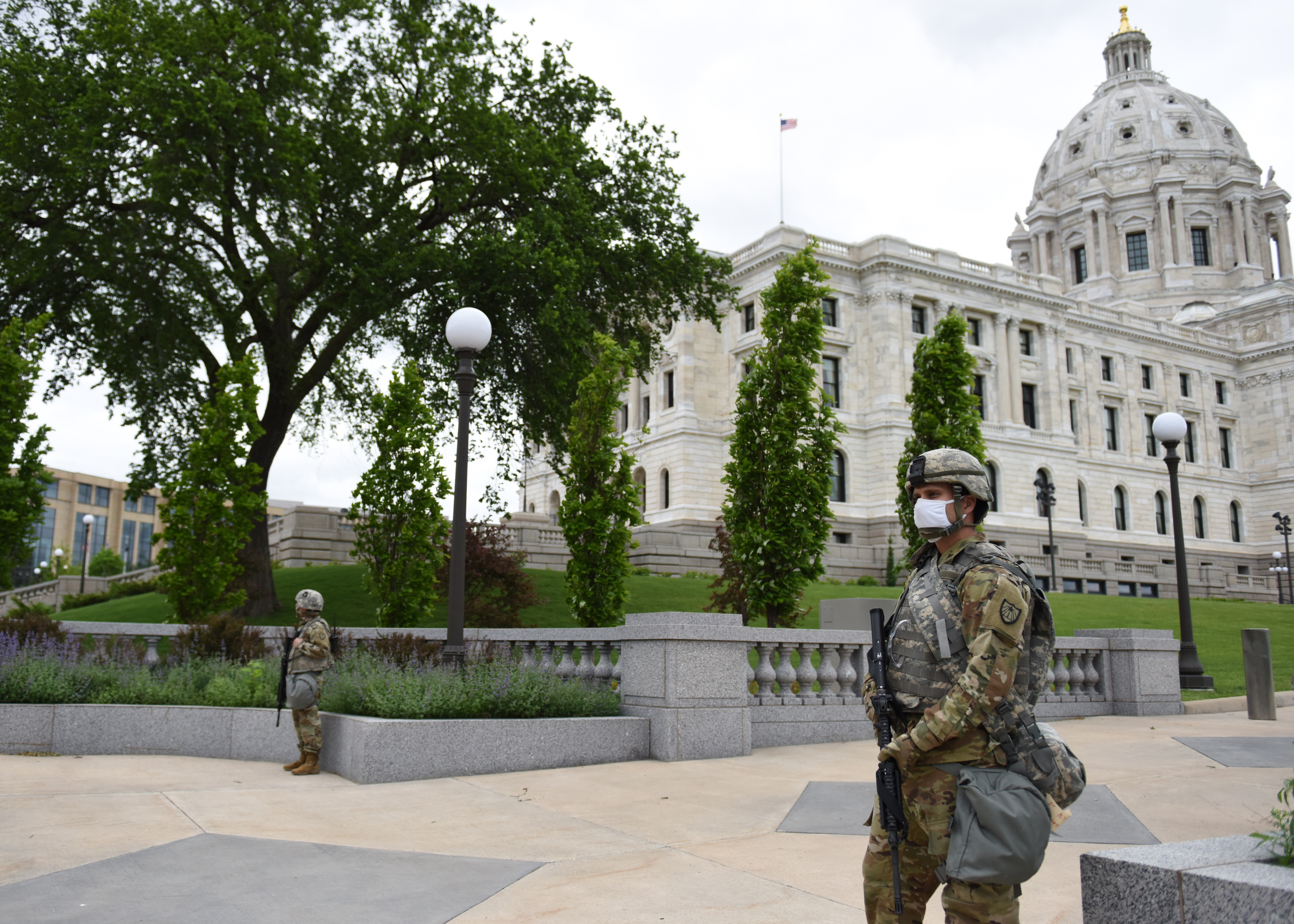
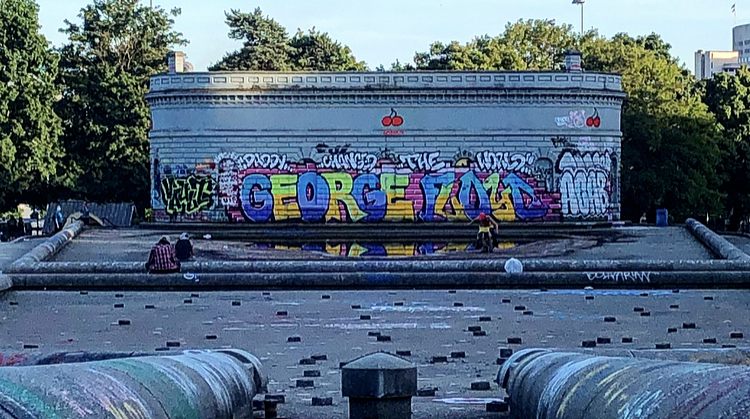
Top: Protesters march past police in Minneapolis on May 28, 2020.
Middle: Minnesota National Guard guard the state capitol building on May 29.
Bottom: George Floyd street art near the Capitol Hill Occupied Protest in Seattle on June 10.

The major catalyst of the unrest was the murder of George Floyd on May 25. Though it was not the first controversial killing of a black person in 2020, it sparked a much wider series of global protests and riots which continued into August 2020. As of June 8, there were at least 19 deaths related to the protests. The George Floyd protests are generally regarded as marking the start of the 2020 United States unrest.

In Minneapolis–Saint Paul alone, the immediate aftermath of Floyd's murder was the second-most destructive period of local unrest in United States history, after the 1992 Los Angeles riots. Over a three night period, the cities experienced two deaths, 617 arrests, and upwards of $500 million in property damage to 1,500 locations, including 150 properties that were set on fire.

On May 2, 2023, the conclusion of the last criminal case for the four officers responsible for murdering George Floyd fulfilled a key demand of protesters that Chauvin, Kueng, Lane, and Thao all be held legally accountable.

=== George Floyd Square occupied protest, May 26, 2020–June 20, 2021 ===
George Floyd Square is a memorial site and former occupied protest at the intersection of East 38th Street and Chicago Avenue in Minneapolis. The street intersection is where Derek Chauvin, a White police officer with the Minneapolis Police Department, kneeled on an OD'ing George Floyd, an unarmed 46-year-old Black man, by kneeling on his neck for 9 minutes and 29 seconds after Floyd was handcuffed and lying face down outside the Cup Foods convenience store on May 25, 2020. Soon after Floyd's murder, people left memorials to him there. The intersection was held as an occupation protest by people who had erected barricades to block vehicular traffic and transformed the space with amenities, social services, and public art of Floyd and that of other racial justice themes. The street intersection reopened to vehicular traffic on June 20, 2021. As of May 2, 2023, activists at George Floyd Square said they would continue to protest until the City of Minneapolis met all items on its list of 24 demands.

=== Sean Monterrosa protests, June 5, 2020–October 2, 2020 ===
On June 5, protests broke out regarding the June 2 killing of Sean Monterrosa, calling for racial justice. These protests continued sporadically but prominently all the way into at least October, resulting in some arrests.

=== Capitol Hill Occupied Protest, June 8, 2020–July 1, 2020 ===
Established on June 8 in Seattle, CHAZ/CHOP was a self-declared autonomous zone established to protest the murder of George Floyd after police abandoned the East Precinct building. Groups like the Puget Sound John Brown Gun Club provided security while the protesters themselves provided either resources or assisted the PSJBGC in security. Multiple people were killed in altercations with security and on July 1 the autonomous zone/occupied protest was officially cleared by the Seattle Police Department.

=== Rayshard Brooks protests, June 12, 2020 ===
Further unrest occurred as a result of the killing of Rayshard Brooks on June 12, largely in Atlanta, where he was killed. An 8-year-old girl was shot and killed during the protests.

=== Andrés Guardado protests, June 18, 2020 ===
Local protests emerged in response to the killing of Guardado on June 18 and involved protesters and media reporters being tear gassed and shot by rubber bullets at the sheriff's station in Compton. The incident was widely reported as the second police killing involving the Los Angeles County Sheriff's Department deputies within two days of one another, the other being Terron Jammal Boone, who was identified as the half-brother of 24-year-old Robert Fuller.

=== Hakim Littleton protests, July 10, 2020 ===
Hakim Littleton was an armed 20-year-old African-American man who was fatally shot by police officers in Detroit, Michigan. In the morning hours of July 5, 2020, police officers were in the process of detaining another individual. Littleton was approached by the officers, pulled out a firearm and shot at one of the officers. An officer tackled him as more shots were fired, and officers responded by shooting Littleton. The incident sparked protests in Detroit which lasted several days, with many protesters disputing the officer's accounts and the body camera footage. Eight individuals were arrested at these protests.

=== Colorado Springs protest, August 4, 2020 ===
In Colorado Springs, a mixture of armed and unarmed Black Lives Matter protesters gathered to mark the one year anniversary of the shooting of De'Von Bailey, protesting in the neighborhood of the officer who shot and killed him. After threats of an armed counterprotest, protesters showed up armed. The protest was largely peaceful, except for multiple cases of heated shouting matches between protesters and residents. Later, on September 11, three people who attended the protest were arrested for various charges in a series of raids.

=== Stone Mountain incident, August 15, 2020 ===
In Stone Mountain, armed Neo-Confederate demonstrators affiliated with the Three Percenters arrived to allegedly protect the Confederate monument, with their operation dubbed "Defend Stone Mountain". They were met with a larger group of anti-racist protesters, some armed, who began pushing them out of the town before the DeKalb County Police Department dispersed both parties. Several minor injuries were reported.

=== Portland "Back the Blue" Rally, August 22, 2020 ===
The Downtown Portland "Back the Blue" Rally, organized by members of the Proud Boys and QAnon Movement, sparked violence between right-wing protesters and left-wing counter-protesters. Within an hour of meeting, both sides began pushing, punching, paint-balling, and macing each other. There was one incident in which a right-wing Proud Boys protester pointed a gun at left-wing protesters, with no shots fired.

=== Kenosha unrest and shooting, August 23 and 25, 2020; 2020 American athlete strikes ===
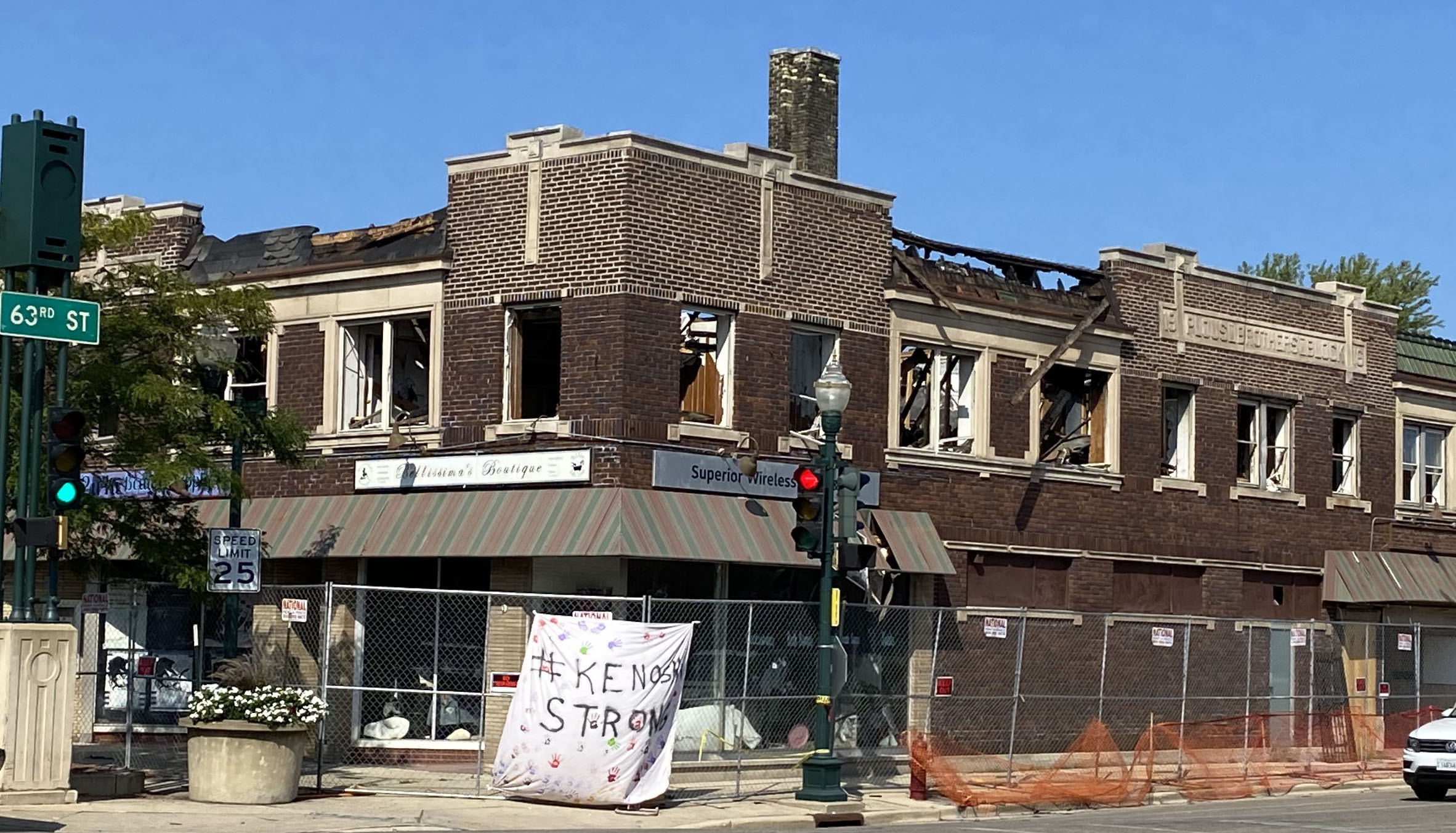
A damaged building following riots in Kenosha, Wisconsin, August 28, 2020

The shooting of Jacob Blake on August 23 sparked protests in a number of American cities, mostly within Kenosha. Two protesters were shot and killed in an incident during the protests. Nationally, athletes from the NHL, NBA, WNBA, MLB, and MLS began going on strike in response to the police shooting of Jacob Blake. On October 14, prosecutors announced that Kyle Rittenhouse, who was charged with killing the two protesters, would not face gun charges in Illinois.

=== Minneapolis false rumors riot, August 26–28, 2020 ===
A riot occurred in downtown Minneapolis in reaction to false rumors about the suicide of Eddie Sole Jr., a 38-year-old African American man; demonstrators believed he had been shot by police officers. Surveillance video showed that Sole Jr. shot himself in the head during a manhunt for a homicide suspect in which he was the person of interest. Controversially, the police released the CCTV camera footage of the suicide in attempts to stop the unrest. Overnight vandalism and looting of stores from August 26 to 27 reached a total of 76 property locations in Minneapolis–Saint Paul, including four businesses that were set on fire. State and local officials arrested a total of 132 people during the unrest.

=== Portland Trump Caravan, August 29, 2020 ===
On August 29, a large group of pro-Trump counterprotesters, arrived in downtown Portland by a vehicle convoy. They were met with opposition from the protesters, resulting in multiple instances of physical clashes. 1 counterprotester was shot and killed in an incident during the protest.

=== Dijon Kizzee protests, August 31, 2020 ===
Dijon Kizzee, an armed cyclist, was shot and killed in the unincorporated Los Angeles neighborhood of Westmont on August 31 by deputies of the Los Angeles County Sheriff's Department. For days, protesters gathered outside the heavily guarded South Los Angeles sheriff's station in tense but peaceful demonstrations. By September 6, those demonstrations escalated to clashes, with deputies firing projectiles and tear gas at the crowds and arresting 35 people over four nights of unrest.

=== Daniel Prude protests, September 2, 2020 ===
On March 22, Daniel Prude was killed by Rochester, New York police officers in what was found by the county medical examiner to be a homicide caused through "complications of asphyxia in the setting of physical restraint". On September 2, the release of a police body camera video and written reports surrounding his death provoked protests in Rochester.

=== Deon Kay protests, September 2, 2020 ===
On September 2, Deon Kay, an armed 18-year-old man, was shot and killed by a police officer in Washington, D.C. Later that day, protesters started gathering outside of the Seventh District Metropolitan Police Department building.

=== Ricardo Munoz protests, September 13, 2020 ===
On September 13, Protests erupted in Lancaster, Pennsylvania after a police officer shot and killed Ricardo Munoz who ran at them with a knife. Police later deployed tear gas on a crowd of protesters, saying demonstrators had damaged buildings and government vehicles and thrown bottles.

=== Deja Stallings protests, October 1, 2020 ===
On September 30, Police arrested 25-year-old Deja Stallings at gas station and convenience store in Kansas City, Missouri, in relation to an alleged 15–20 individuals fighting on the business's property. Video footage showed an officer kneeling on the back of Stallings, who is nine months pregnant. In response to the video, demonstrators began protesting outside city hall demanding the resignation of Kansas City Police Department Chief Richard Smith and for the city to redirect 50% of the police department's budget to social services.

=== Jonathan Price protests, October 5, 2020 ===
On October 5, 31-year old Jonathan Price was killed by a police officer in Wolfe City, Texas, after allegedly trying to break off a fight. Protests broke out in major cities to which New York City and Los Angeles faced property damage after night of vandalism. Shaun David Lucas, a police officer who shot Price, was arrested and charged with murder.

=== Alvin Cole protests, October 7, 2020 ===
On the afternoon of October 7, the district attorney in Milwaukee County decided to not press charges in relation to the fatal shooting of Alvin Cole, 17 in Wauwatosa, Wisconsin, back in February. Protests occurred thereafter, leading to the arrest of 24 protesters on October 8 and 28 protesters on October 9.

=== Marcellis Stinnette protests, October 22, 2020 ===
On October 22, 19-year old Marcellis Stinnette was shot and killed by an officer in Waukegan, Illinois. His girlfriend, 20-year old Tafarra Williams, was also wounded, but is expected to survive. Protests occurred in Waukegan on October 22. The family of Jacob Blake, who was shot 16 miles north of Waukegan in Kenosha, Wisconsin, were also in attendance.

=== Walter Wallace Jr. protests, October 26, 2020 ===
On October 26 Walter Wallace Jr. was killed by Philadelphia police officers while holding a knife and ignoring orders to drop it. A march for Wallace occurred in West Philadelphia, while other areas of the city reported looting and vandalism. Police also said 30 officers were injured, many struck by bricks and other debris and that 91 protesters were arrested.

=== Kevin Peterson Jr. protests, October 30, 2020 ===
On October 29, Kevin Peterson Jr. was shot and killed by three Clark County sheriff's deputies in Hazel Dell, Washington, near Vancouver. Hundreds gathered in Hazel Dell for a vigil the following evening with protesters carrying signs saying "Honk for Black lives. White silence is violence" and "Scream his name," and confronting right-wing counter-protesters. That night, hundreds of protesters marched through Downtown Vancouver, resulting in property damage and a confrontation with federal agents. At least one person was arrested after the protest was declared an unlawful assembly and a dispersal order was issued by police.

=== Protests against LA Mayor Eric Garcetti, November 23, 2020 ===
On November 23, protesters gathered outside Los Angeles Mayor Eric Garcetti's home due to his refusal to further defund the LAPD. Protests increased when news was released regarding president-elect Joe Biden's consideration of adding Garcetti to his cabinet.

=== Red House eviction defense protest, December 8, 2020 ===
there

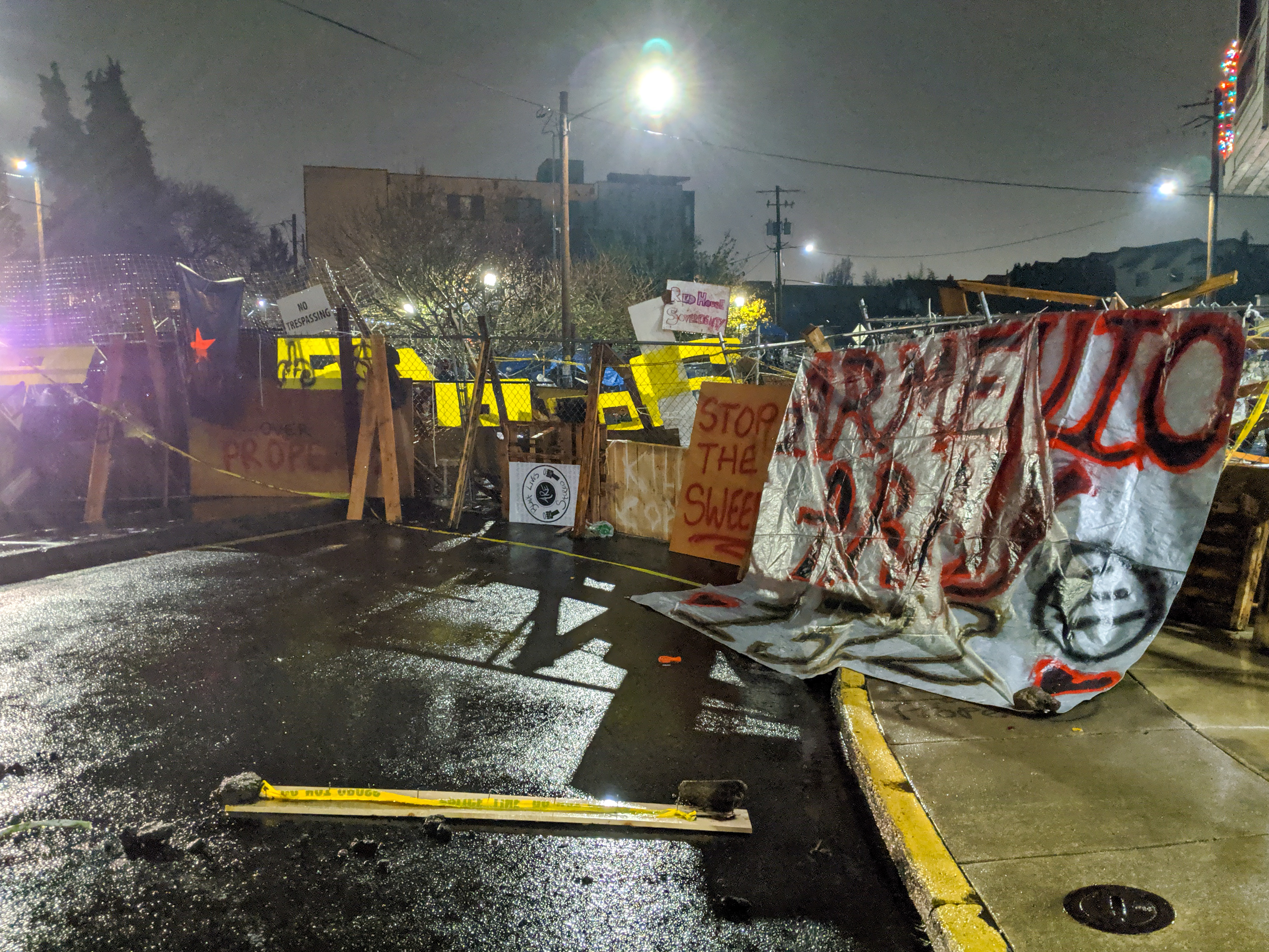
Perimeter barricades erected by protesters during the Red House eviction defense in Portland, Oregon, on December 8

On December 8, protesters in Portland gathered to blockade parts of the Humboldt Neighborhood in order to protect a family who had been evicted after living in their home for 65 years. Protesters blockaded the area similar to the Capitol Hill Occupied Protest.

=== Casey Goodson protests, December 11, 2020 ===
On December 4, police were finishing an unsuccessful search for a fugitive in Columbus, Ohio, when Casey Goodson "drove by and waved a gun" at an officer. A witness heard the officer command Goodson to drop his gun, and when he did not comply, Goodson was shot five times outside his home. Police recovered a gun from the scene.

=== Bennie Edwards protests, December 11, 2020 ===
On December 11, Bennie Edwards, a schizophrenic homeless man, was killed by Oklahoma City police while wielding a knife. Demonstrations were held later that evening.

=== Andre Hill protests, December 24, 2020 ===
On December 22, Andre Hill (also identified as Andre' Hill) was killed by a Columbus Police officer as he left a house where he was a guest. On Christmas Eve, protests were held in response to the shooting. The shooting was the second police killing in Columbus in the month, following the shooting of Casey Goodson.

=== Dolal Idd protests, December 30, 2020–January 4, 2022 ===
On December 30, Dolal Idd, an armed 23-year old Somali-American man, was shot and killed in a shootout he started with Minneapolis police officers during a felony traffic stop. Idd's death was the first killing by a Minneapolis police since the murder of George Floyd on May 25. Activists and family members of Dolal Idd rallied in Saint Paul on January 4, 2022, outside the official residence of Minnesota Governor Tim Walz. At the event, they called for further investigation of the incident that led to Idd's death and the release of additional evidence in the case.

== 2021 ==
=== Rochester protests, February 1, 2021 ===
About 200 protesters marched in Rochester, New York, on February 1 after a nine-year-old girl was handcuffed and pepper-sprayed by police. Community outrage swelled following release of footage the previous day showing officers restraining and scolding a girl, who was screaming for her father. At one point, an officer is heard telling her to "stop acting like a child," to which she cried, "I am a child." Protesters ripped away barricades protecting a Rochester police precinct as hundreds took to the streets in outrage.

=== Manhattan protests, February 12, 2021 ===
A Black Lives Matter march through Midtown Manhattan became violent with clashes between protesters and authorities on February 12, leading to the arrest of 11 protesters. The authorities arrested 11 people around Times Square in which two officers and a news reporter were also injured. Protesters clashed with police at W. 54th Street and Sixth Avenue around 9 p.m.

=== Trial of Derek Chauvin protests, March 7, 2021–June 25, 2021 ===
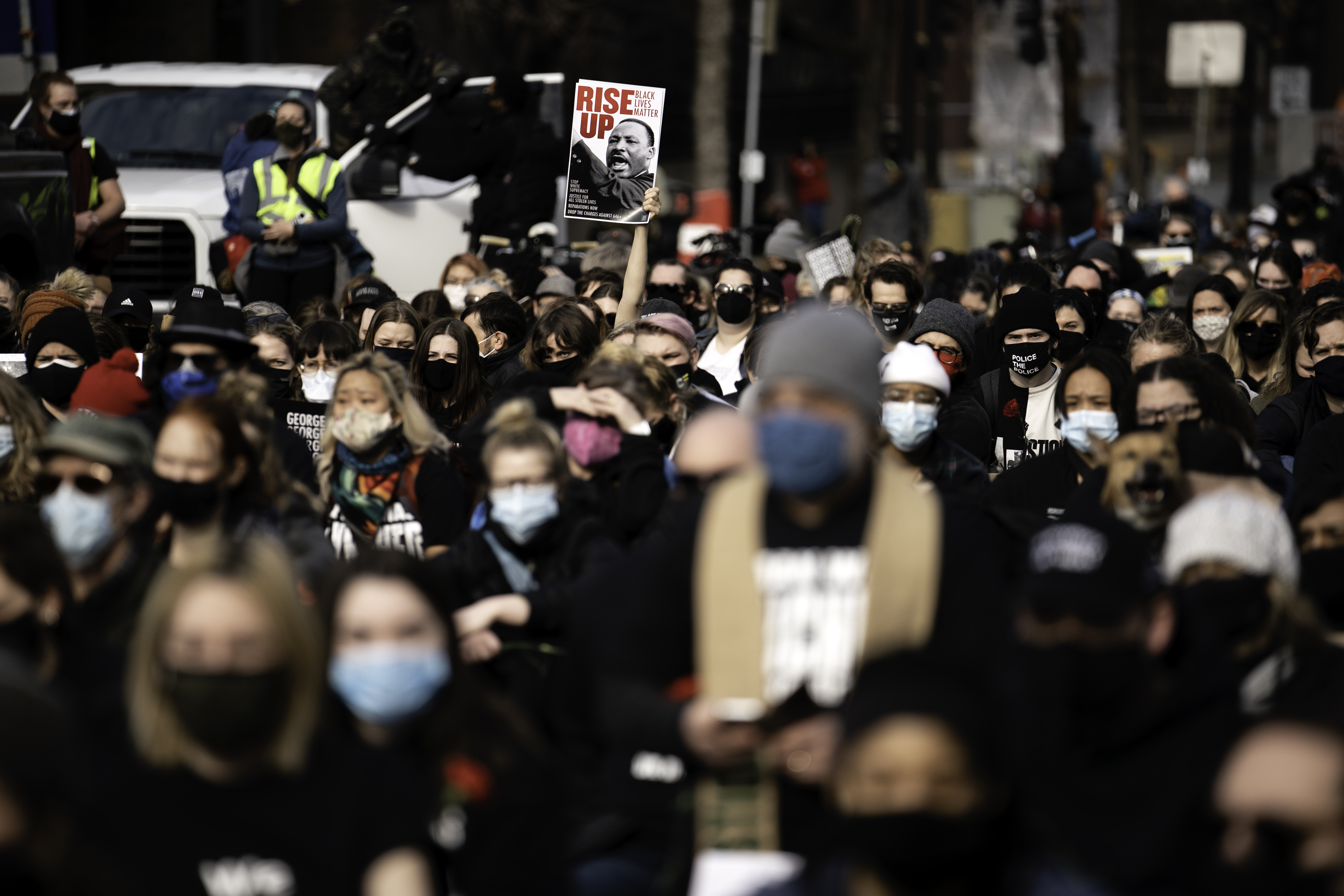
Protestors march in Minneapolis on March 7, 2021.

Approximately a thousand protesters outside a downtown Minneapolis courthouse as Chauvin's trial commenced on March 8, 2021, to call for justice for Floyd and raise broader issues of racial injustice. Officials surrounded the facility with a concrete barrier, metal fencing, and barbed wire in anticipation of unrest. Protests and rallies planned for the George Floyd Square were halted for several days after a fatal shooting there on March 6, 2021.

On March 28, 2021, the day before opening statements in the trial of Derek Chauvin, several rallies and protests were held in Minneapolis. Separately, protesters marched in downtown Minneapolis to demand justice for Floyd and rallied at the Hennepin County Government Center and City Hall, and some demonstrators parked cars on the Metro light-rail tracks, which closed train traffic for several hours. At 38th and Chicago Avenue, the street intersection where Floyd was murdered, a group of people held a training workshop at the square on how to avoid arrest and keep calm if detained by police.

=== Atlanta shooting protests, March 16, 2021–2022 ===
On March 16, 2021, a series of mass shootings occurred at three spas in metropolitan Atlanta, Georgia. Eight people were killed, six of whom were Asian women. A suspect, 21-year-old Robert Aaron Long, was taken into custody later that day. Several anti-Asian violence rallies have been held across the United States in 2021 in response to the recent rise of racism against Asian Americans. Several of the rallies are named "Stop Asian Hate".

=== Daunte Wright protests, April 11, 2021–December 23, 2021; Sentencing protests, February 18, 2022 ===
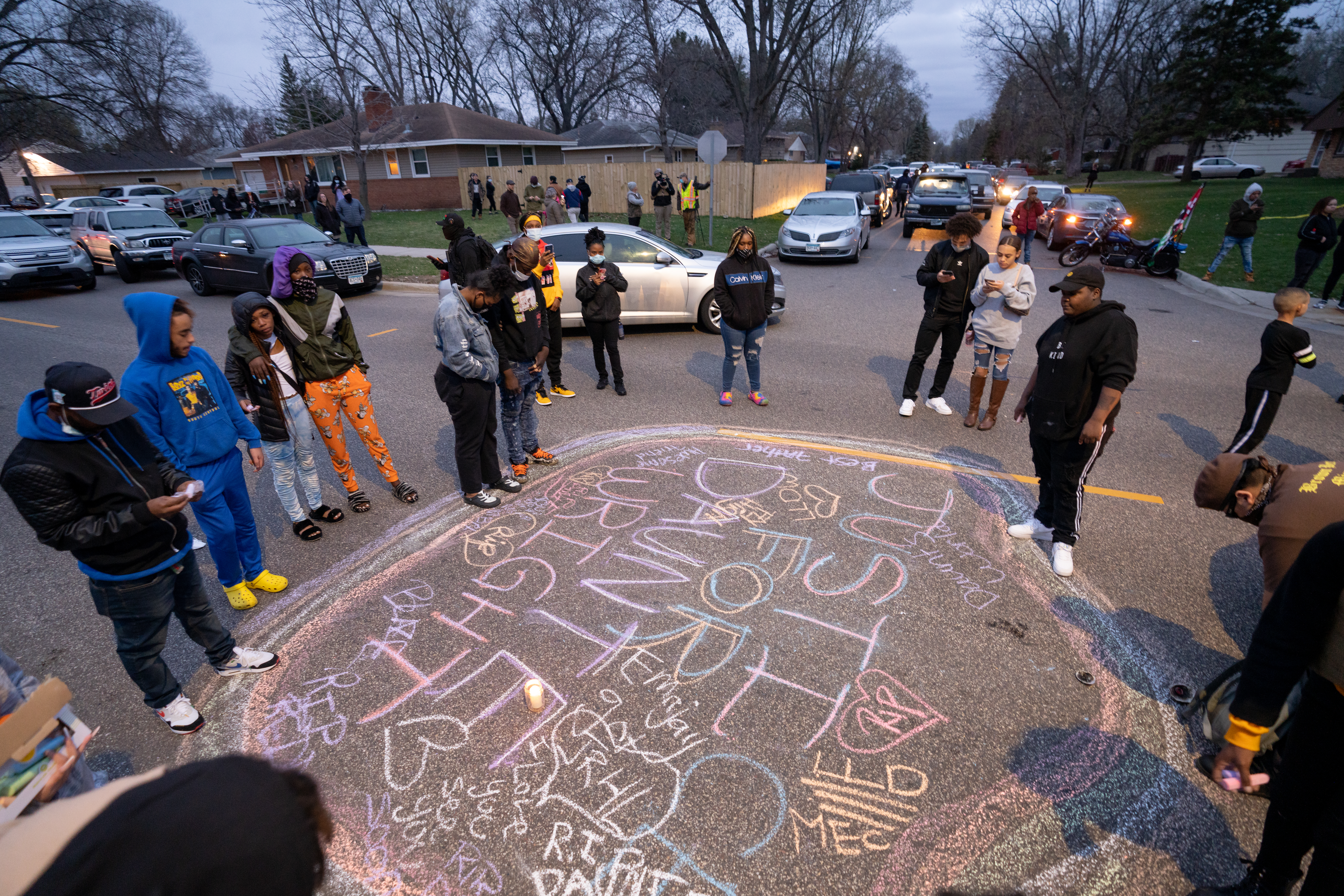
Mourners gather near the site where Daunte Wright was killed, April 11, 2021.

On April 11, 2021, at 1:48 p.m., 20-year-old Daunte Wright was shot and killed during a traffic stop by Kim Potter, an officer with the police department of Brooklyn Center, a suburb of Minneapolis. His girlfriend, a passenger in his car, was also injured. An initially peaceful demonstration at the scene of the shooting turned violent following a strengthened police presence, and looting was reported. On April 13, 2021, Potter resigned, as well as Brooklyn Center police chief Tim Gannon, who said that Potter accidentally fired her gun. The next day, Potter was charged with second-degree manslaughter.

=== Adam Toledo protests, April 15–16, 2021 ===
On March 29, 2021, at 2:38 a.m., a 13-year-old Mexican American boy, Adam Toledo, was shot and killed by Eric Stillman, a Chicago Police Department officer, in the Little Village neighborhood on the West Side of Chicago. After the incident, the Chicago Police Department stated Toledo had been killed after an armed confrontation with police. Several days later, Cook County prosecutor James Murphy alleged in court that Adam was holding a gun the instant when Stillman shot him. When Stillman's body cam footage was released on April 15, 2021, Toledo could be seen raising his hands unarmed immediately prior to being killed. The release of the footage sparked protests in Chicago and around the country.

=== Ma'Khia Bryant protests, April 20–22, 2021 ===
On April 20, 2021, Ma'Khia Bryant, a 16-year-old African-American girl, was fatally shot by Columbus police officer Nicholas Reardon in Columbus, Ohio when she attacked another girl with a knife. Bryant was transported to Mount Carmel East hospital, where she was pronounced dead. The killing sparked protests in Columbus and around Ohio. A few dozen protesters would hold a sit-in protest outside the Colorado state capitol starting on the evening of April 23 and ending on the afternoon of April 24.

=== Andrew Brown Jr. protests, April 24, 2021–May 2, 2021 ===
On April 21, 2021, 42-year-old Andrew Brown Jr. was fatally shot in the back of the head by police as he drove away. Protesters gathered in Elizabeth City, North Carolina, where the shooting occurred, demanding for body camera footage to be released.

=== David McAtee protests, May 26, 2021–June 5, 2021 ===
On June 1, 2020, business owner David McAtee was shot and killed by two Louisville Metro Police Department officers and by two Kentucky Army National Guard soldiers. In May 2021, the state of Kentucky announced that there will not be chargers file against the officers and soldiers involved in the shooting. Shortly after the announcement was made people in Kentucky began to protest. Several demonstrators were arrested including the brother of David McAtee. The brother of David McAtee was charged with unlawful assembly and obstructing the highway.

=== Tulsa Race Massacre Anniversary protests, May 31, 2021 ===
Hundreds of African-American gun owners from around the US marched in Tulsa, Oklahoma, to remember those murdered in the massacre on the eve of its 100th anniversary. The Elmer Geronimo Pratt Gun Club of Austin, Texas, and New Black Panther Party organized the event. Slogans of "Black Power" and "Black Lives Matter" were heard during the rally.

=== Winston Boogie Smith protests and Uptown Minneapolis unrest, June 3, 2021–November 3, 2021; vehicle-ramming attack June 13, 2021 ===
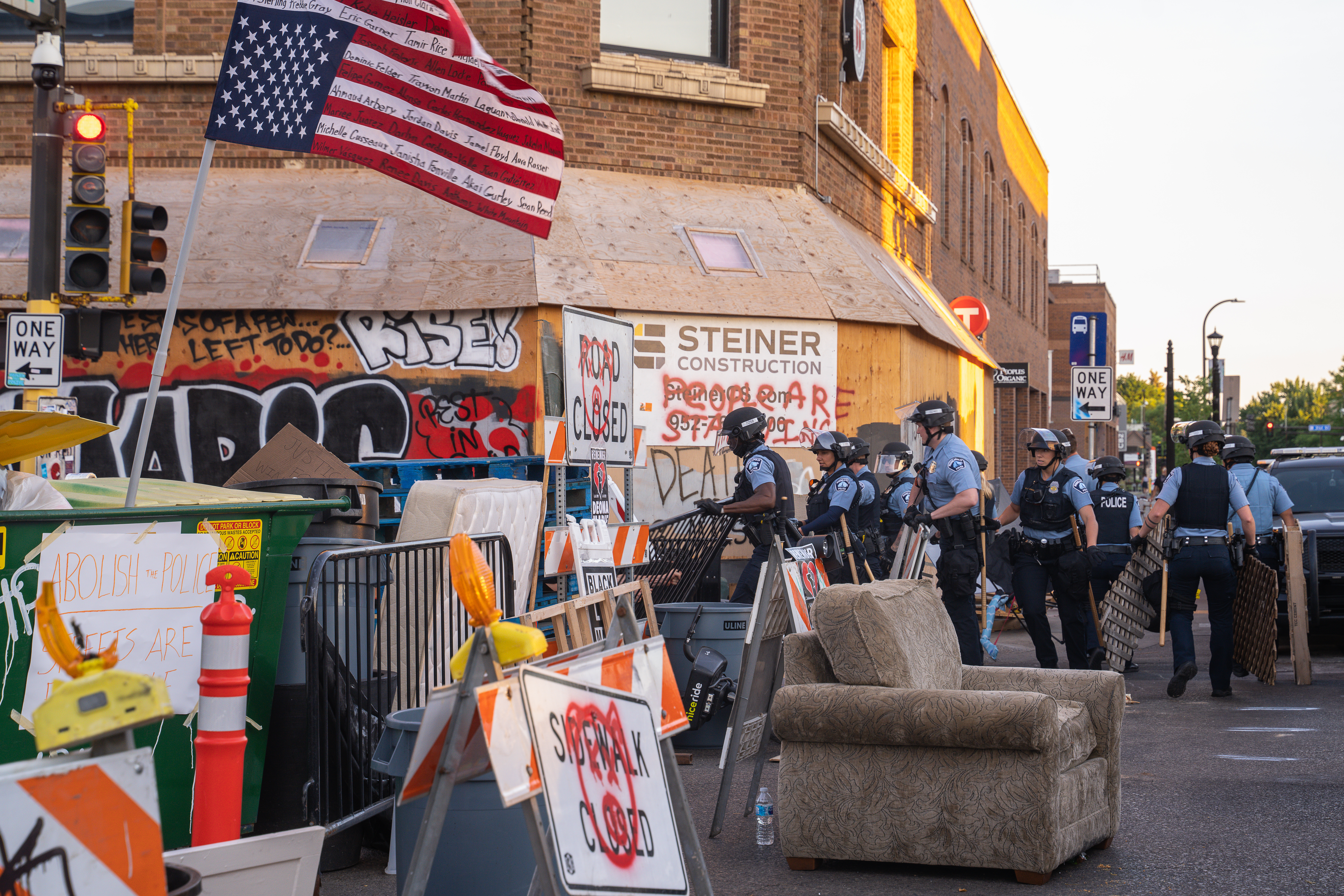
Police clearing makeshift barricades during protests in Minneapolis on June 15, 2021

Winston Boogie Smith, a 32-year old black man, was shot and killed by law enforcement authorities on June 3, 2021, as they attempted to apprehend him at a parking ramp in the Uptown neighborhood of Minneapolis. Protests following the killing began on June 3 and continued for several days, primarily in Uptown. Soon after the shooting, Smith's family demanded greater law enforcement transparency and the release of any surveillance footage that might have captured the incident. Civil rights activists and Smith's friends and family disputed the law enforcement accounts of the incident. Local organization Communities United Against Police Brutality held a press conference near the shooting site on June 4 to call for officials to release video footage and other details of the shooting. Family and friends of Smith held a peaceful vigil the evening of June 4 at the parking ramp where he was killed, and participated in a protest march on June 6. Activist Nekima Levy Armstrong led a protest on June 8 outside the home of Minnesota's U.S. Marshal, Ramona Dohman, calling for her resignation. Armstrong alleged that Dohman, a Trump administration appointee, had a conflict of interest due to a past working relationship with the Minnesota Bureau of Criminal Apprehension. On June 13, a demonstrator was killed and three others were injured when a vehicle rammed into a protest at the intersection of Lake Street and Girard Avenue.

On June 13, 2021, a man drove a car into a crowd of demonstrators who had gathered as a part of the ongoing Winston Boogie Smith protests, killing Deona Marie Knajdek and injuring three others. That evening, demonstrators had blocked the intersection of West Lake Street and Girard Avenue. At approximately 11:39 p.m. CDT, a man in a Jeep Cherokee drove into the crowd at a high speed, striking a parked vehicle that had been used to block off the intersection to traffic, which then collided with protesters. On June 16, 2021, the driver was charged with second-degree intentional murder and two counts of assault with a deadly weapon in relation to the crash, after allegedly telling investigators that he had accelerated towards the crowd in an attempt to clear the barricades that were protecting protesters.

=== Kyle Rittenhouse protests, November 1, 2021–November 19, 2021 ===
Several protests took place outside the Kenosha County Courthouse in Kenosha, Wisconsin during the trial of Kyle Rittenhouse between November 1, 2021, and November 19, 2021. Following Rittenhouse's acquittal on November 19, rioting broke out in Portland, Oregon. Large protests also occurred in New York City, Chicago, Los Angeles, and Minneapolis.

== 2022 ==
=== Jason Walker protests, January 10–20, 2022 ===
On January 8, 2022, Jason Walker was shot and killed by an off-duty police lieutenant in Fayetteville, North Carolina. Police claim Walker jumped on the lieutenant's truck. Walker was unarmed during the incident. Protests were held after the shooting and on Martin Luther King Jr. Day.

=== Civil rights trial of Kueng, Lane, and Thao protests, January 24, 2022–August 15, 2022 ===
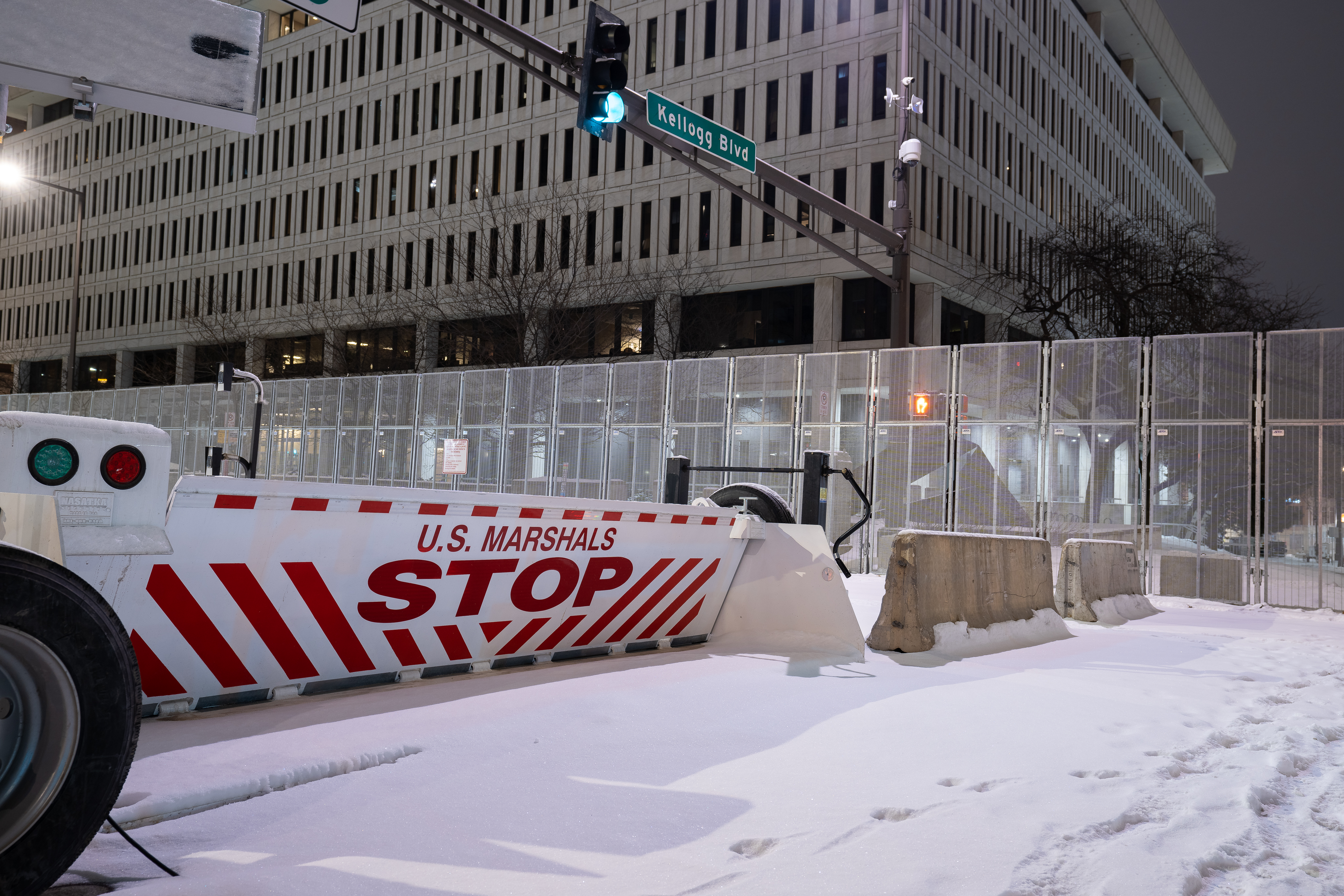
Counter-protest security measures at the Warren E. Burger Federal Building, January 23, 2022

In early 2022, local officials prepared counter-protest measures for potential unrest ahead of the scheduled January 20 start of the federal civil rights trial of J. Alexander Kueng, Thomas Lane, and Tou Thao—Minneapolis police officers who were at the scene of George Floyd's murder on May 25, 2020. Officials erected security fencing around the Warren E. Burger Federal Building in Saint Paul, Minnesota, that contained the courtroom for the trial. Ahead of the trial, protesters said they were concerned about the trial's potential outcome and were prepared to demonstrate.

Protest demonstrations were held in the streets surrounding the courtroom building during the trial.

=== Amir Locke Protests, February 2, 2022–April 8, 2022 ===
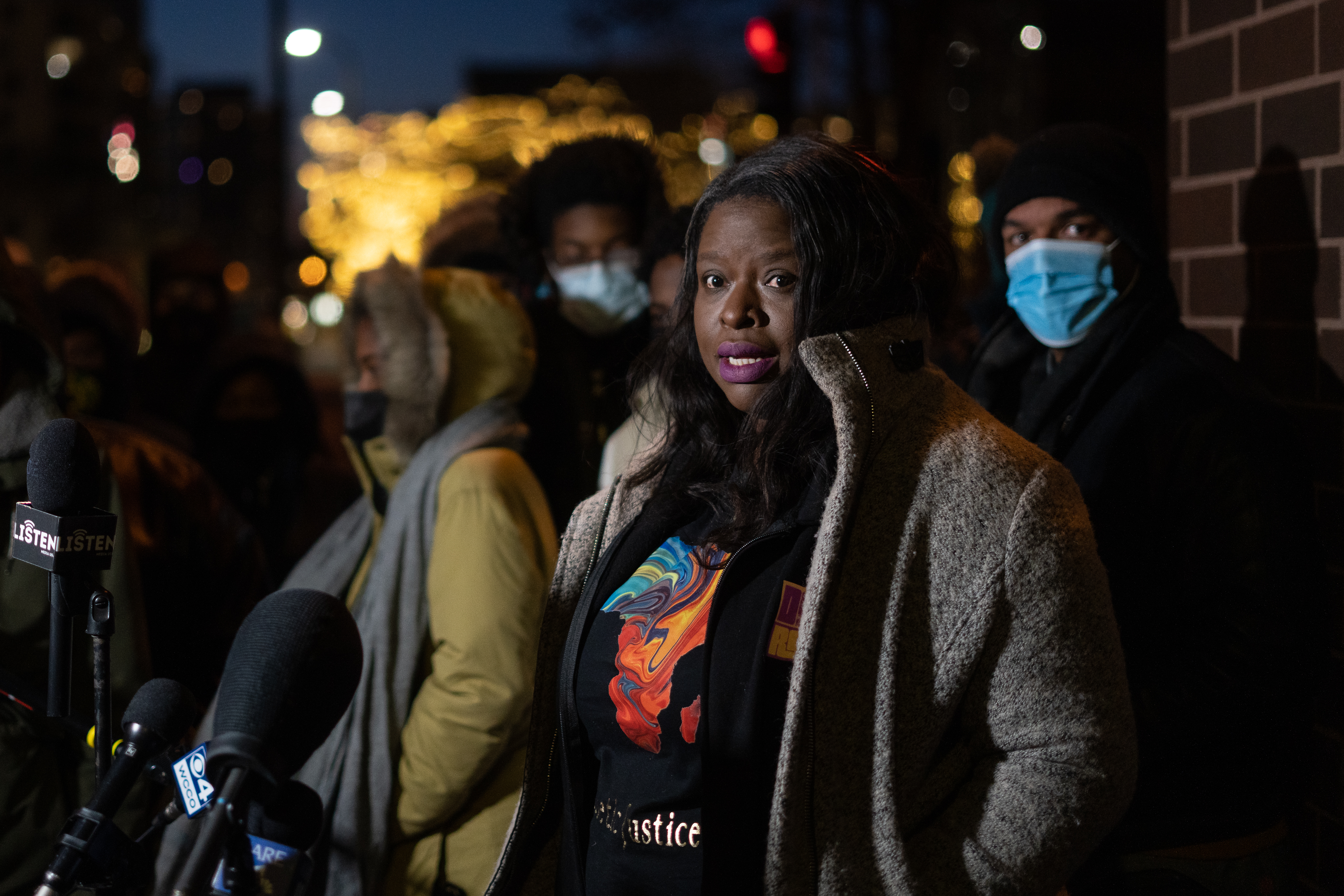
Civil rights activists speak about the killing of Amir Locke, February 2, 2022

On February 2, Amir Locke was shot and killed by a police officer in Minneapolis. As a result of Locke's death, Minneapolis Mayor Jacob Frey announced a moratorium on no-knock warrants. A group of advocates held a vigil on the evening of February 2 outside the downtown apartment building where the law enforcement killing took place. On February 5, hundreds of people in Minneapolis protested Locke's death.

=== Patrick Lyoya Protests, April 4, 2022–June 10, 2022 ===
On April 4, Patrick Lyoya was fatally shot in the back of the head by a police officer in Grand Rapids, Michigan. Protestors gathered outside the Grand Rapids Police Department demanding the name of the officer involved be released.

=== Jayland Walker protests, June 27, 2022–July 17, 2022 ===
On June 27, 2022, at approximately 12:30 a.m., Akron, Ohio, police officers killed Jayland Walker, a 25-year-old American black man from Akron. Following a traffic stop and car chase, officers pursued on foot and fired more than 90 times at Walker. The day of the shooting, protesters gathered outside the police department in downtown Akron. Standoffs with police occurred. Barricades were installed around the police department on July 2. Protests occurred for more than three days straight. Akron officials announced that July 4 celebrations would be cancelled due to the shooting. Akron mayor Dan Horrigan declared a state of emergency and issued a curfew for the downtown Akron area in response to property destruction during night-time protests. The curfew was lifted on July 17, 2022.

=== Andrew Tekle Sundberg protests, July 2022 ===
Andrew Tekle Sundberg, an armed 20-year-old Ethiopian-American man, was shot and killed by Minneapolis police officers on July 14. At 9:30 p.m. on July 13 at an apartment building on the 900 block of 21st Avenue in the Seward neighborhood, Minneapolis police responded to reports of gunshots being fired from one apartment unit into another. Police that arrived at the scene observed more shots being fired through interior walls and evacuated the apartment building. A six-hour standoff ensued with Sundberg, the alleged assailant, who, according to police, also fired at officers. At about 4:30 a.m. on July 14, two police officer snipers fired their rifles, fatally wounding Sundberg. The shooting is under investigation.

Family of Sundberg and activists held a vigil near the apartment building the evening of July 14. Another rally was held near the apartment building on July 16. Family members, who retained civil rights attorneys Benjamin Crump and Jeff Storms, questioned why Sundberg was shot by police and sought release of police body camera footage. A woman whose apartment was shot up confronted Sundberg's family and activists during the July 16 demonstration.

Sundberg's killing led to further mistrust between police and community activists who questioned why police used deadly tactics to end the standoff. Public outrage gave way to protests in Minneapolis, but demonstrations were dwindling in size compared to the period after Floyd's murder.

== 2023 ==
=== Boston police brutality protest, January 16, 2023 ===
Sayed Faisal, a 20-year old student at the University of Massachusetts Boston, was confronted by police on January 4, 2023, while holding a kukri to his neck, and as Faisal allegedly moved towards officers with the kukri, an officer fatally shot him. On January 16, 2023, the Martin Luther King Jr. Day holiday, about 75 protesters marched between Boston and Cambridge. The protest began near the home of Terrence Coleman, who was killed by police in 2016. Protesters chanted the names of several Black men who had been killed by police and held a moment of silence for Faisal.

=== Manuel Terán protests, January 20–22, 2023; Atlanta riot, January 21, 2023 ===
Protests were held in several U.S. cities in reaction to the killing of Manuel Terán, a Venezuelan-born person, who was fatally shot by a Georgia State Patrol officer on January 18, 2023, while protesting the construction of a police training facility in Atlanta, Georgia. Notable protests and vigils were held in Atlanta, Bridgeport, Minneapolis, Nashville, Philadelphia, and Tucson from January 20–22, 2023. Protests in Atlanta on January 21, 2023, briefly turned violent as some demonstrators threw objects, set police car on fire, and smashed windows of bank buildings with hammers. The Atlanta riot had broad participation from people across the United States. Six people—most of whom were White and from outside of the U.S. state of Georgia—were arrested and charged criminally for actions during the January 21 riot.

=== Tyre Nichols protests, January 27, 2023–February 1, 2023 ===
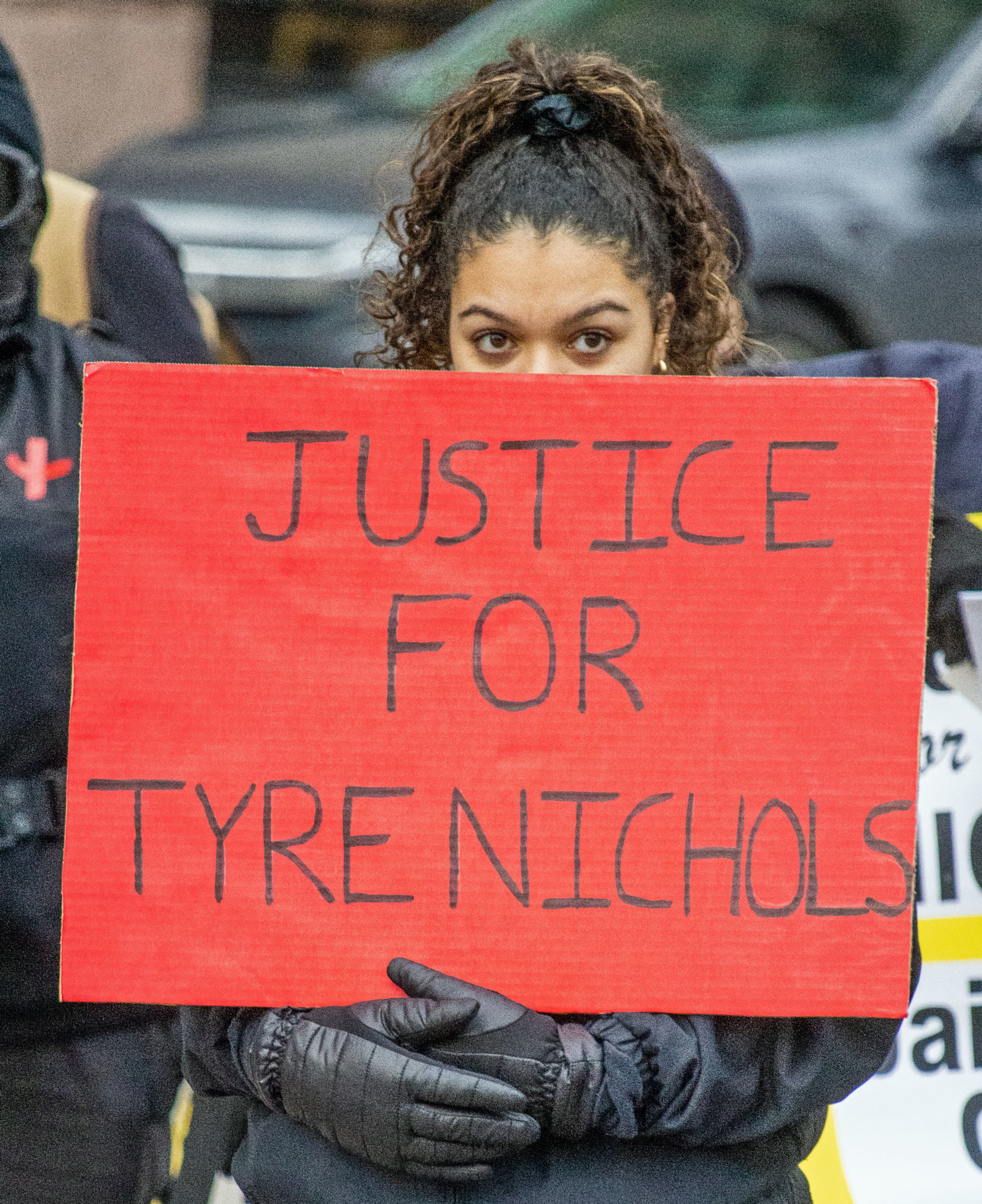
A protester in Columbus, Ohio

Several major cities in the United States prepared for potential unrest ahead of the scheduled January 27, 2023, official release of video that captured the arrest and police beating of Tyre Nichols in Memphis, Tennessee, on January 7, 2023. Nichols died three days later, and five black officers from the Memphis Police Department have been charged with murder. President Joe Biden joined Nichols' family in calling for peaceful protests. Several protests at police department facilities in the United States were planned ahead of the video's release. State and local governments have prepared security measures, such as the Georgia National Guard, which was mobilized proactively.

=== Jordan Neely protests, May 3–12, 2023 ===
Protestors chant "Say his name, Jordan Neely" as they walk down Madison Avenue on May 6.

Protests were held in New York City in response to the killing of Jordan Neely, a 30-year-old African American man and Michael Jackson impersonator, by Daniel Penny, a white ex-Marine while riding the F Train on May 1, 2023. Penny approached Neely from behind, placing him in a chokehold until Neely was unconscious. Neely was pronounced dead once taken to Lenox Hill Hospital. Penny was released without any charges. Two days after Neely's killing, a vigil-turned-protest was held inside the Broadway–Lafayette Street station, in which the arrest and charge of the then unnamed man who choked Neely was demanded. On May 5, 2023, protests took place across the city, including locations such as the Broadway-Lafayette Street station, the Washington Square Park, and outside the Manhattan district attorney's office, calling for criminal charges to be brought. Protests were again held on May 6, 2023, at various locations in Manhattan. On May 8, 2023, there were clashes between demonstrators and police during the protests, and various arrests were made that night.

=== Cyrus Carmack-Belton protests, May 28–29, 2023 ===
Protests were held in Columbia, South Carolina after 14-year old Cyrus Carmack-Belton was killed as he was running on Parklane Road in Columbia, South Carolina. Rick Chow, the owner, claimed Carmack-Belton was shoplifting water bottles as he was exiting the Shell Gas station. Chow was then arrested for murder. Additional protests were held at that Shell gas station after a Richland County, South Carolina jury found Rick Chow not guilty on June 1, 2026. CNN reported, "A defense lawyer said Chow fired to defend his son only after the teen pointed a gun at him... Prosecutors acknowledged Carmack-Belton had a semiautomatic pistol, but they say it fell on the ground during the chase, and he never threatened anyone with it."

== See also ==
- List of unarmed African Americans killed by law enforcement officers in the United States
