= Wilshire Private School =

1985–2018 school in Los Angeles, United States

Coordinates: 34.0616°N 118.3372°W

Wilshire Private School, previously called the Wilshire School, the Hankook School, and the Los Angeles Hankook Academy, was a primary and secondary school located in Koreatown, Los Angeles. It was in the Mid-City/Mid-Wilshire area. It was sponsored by the Korean Institute of Southern California (KISC, 남가주한국학원/南加州韓國學院). Its primary target students were Korean Americans. In 1994, the principal, John Regan, stated that Hankook School was the only educational facility that targeted Korean students in the United States.

In August 2018, the school closed its doors and ceased due to lack of fundings and enrollments. This closure marked Wilshire Elementary School's 33rd year of service.

== History ==
The Korean Institute of Southern California opened the school in 1985.

According to Regan, First Lady of South Korea Son Myeong-sun visited the school on one occasion. In 1994 Regan stated that the Hankook School planned for a larger student body in the future. The school's name changed to Wilshire Elementary School in 1998.

Wilshire Elementary School's first economic crisis struck in 1998. KISC assigned a new headmaster to help take care of the issue and was granted financial aid by the South Korean Government. But not so long after the struggles worsened, and debt to the South Korean Government increased instead. The financial issue re-surfaced even worse in 2008, and by this point school enrollment shrunk approximately 75% with just 56 students, compared to its 1992 records which had over 200 students.

By its final year on 2018, the school only had 18 students, and no further enrollments occurred ever since. The head of KISC commented that Wilshire Private School's "euthanasia was predicted 20 years beforehand", and that it "wasn't a surprise."

== Campuses ==
As of 1994, the school had two campuses- students in Grades K-5 would attend the Wilshire Boulevard campus and students of Grades 6-12 would attend the Melrose Avenue campus which had a capacity for 240 students. The Melrose Campus is in the Greater Wilshire/Hancock Park area.

The Melrose Campus was the first to experience financial decline. In 1998, services for high school came to a halt, and the playground for middle school students were confiscated by the city government the year after.

Melrose Campus, along with their middle school service closed in 1999, and the Wilshire Campus, which serviced elementary school, completed the closure nearly two decades later in the summer of 2018.

== Curriculum ==
Its classes are conducted in the English language. The school offers Korean music classes. The school's programming incorporates Korean culture and traditional Korean music.

In 1994 K. Connie Kang of the Los Angeles Times wrote that the school had "high academic standards".

== Operations ==
As of 1994 the school collected tuition in monthly installments. As of 1994 the annual total tuition was $3,750 {$8145.77 when adjusted for inflation).

== Student body ==
In 1994 the school had 171 students in grades K-5 and 24 students in grades 6–12, giving the school a total of 195 students. There were two Kindergarten classes that year. As of 1994 there was about 20-1 student-teacher ratio.

As of 1994 Koreans make up about 95% of the school's students. Students born in Korea who immigrated to the United States make up the majority of the students. This group is called the "1.5 generation." Regan stated that 90% of the Kindergarten students spoke only the Korean language.

== Teacher demographics ==
As of 1994 the school had 20 full-time teachers. To serve students with little English proficiency, some classrooms haD aides who speak Korean. As of 1994 few of the full-time teachers were bilingual.
