= Timeline of the Crips–Bloods gang war =

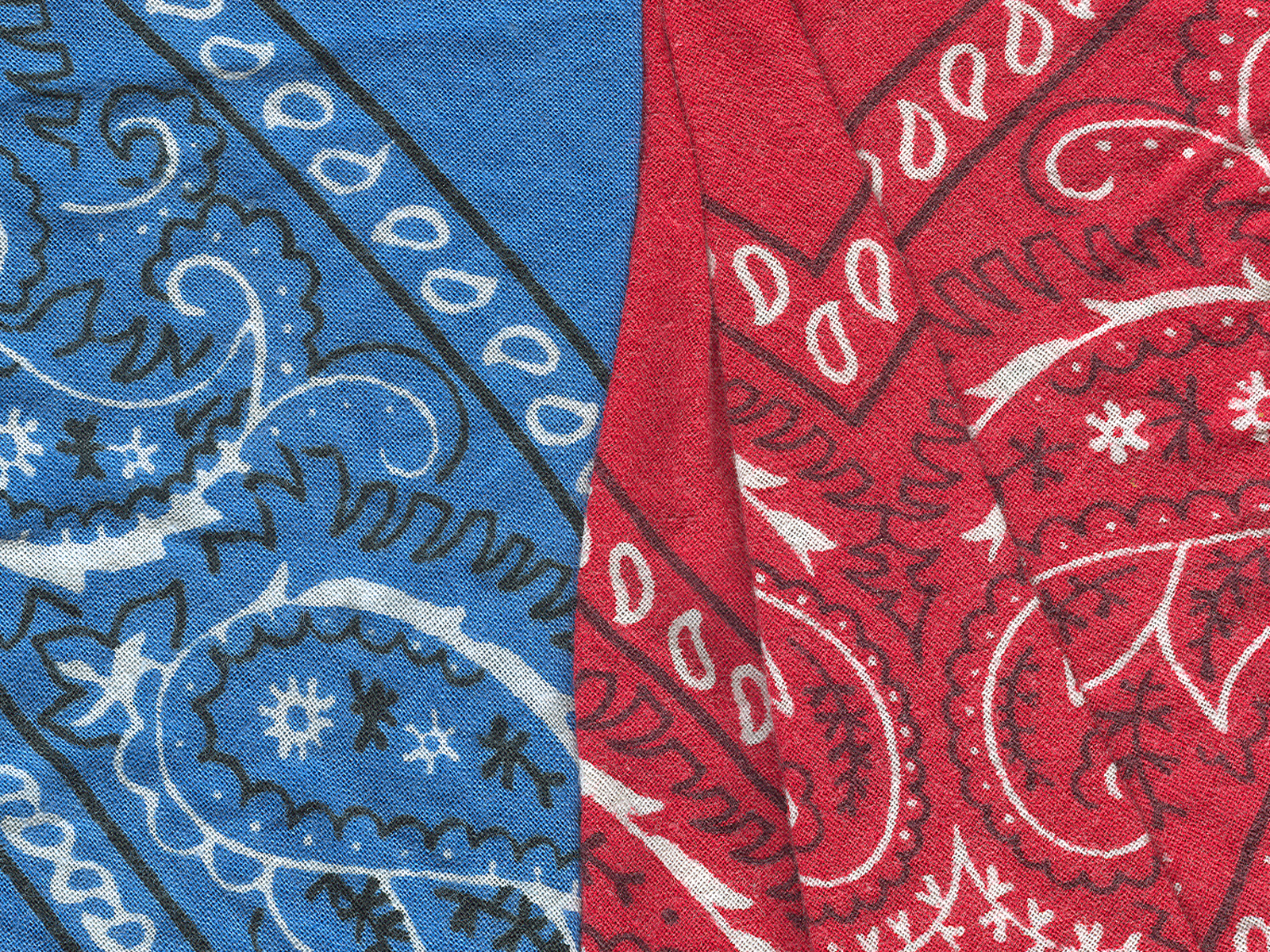
At least 15,000 people have been killed over the course of the Crips–Bloods gang war

The Crips and Bloods, which are among two of the largest street gangs in the United States, have been embroiled in a rivalry since 1972, with additional conflict between rival "sets" within each overarching gang.

== 1970s ==
1971

- Stanley Williams was approached by Raymond Washington in George Washington High School, who proposed to Williams that they unite in order to defend themselves from local gangs. This alliance between Stanley Williams and Raymond Washington led to the formation of the Crips.

1972

- The merging of various streets gangs including the Piru Street Boys, Denver Lanes and Brims, to form the Bloods, as a countermeasure against Crip domination of Los Angeles.

1973

- According to Stanley Williams, the Crips started wearing blue after Curtis "Buddha" Morrow, who was an early member of the gang, was shot dead on February 23, 1973.

1974

- Crips co-founder Raymond Washington is imprisoned for robbery, leading to a decline in his influence over the gang.

1979

- February 28 – March 7: Stanley Williams goes on a robbery spree, killing 4 people, resulting in his arrest.
- August 9: Raymond Washington is shot dead by a member of the Hoover Crips in a drive-by shooting.
- Rivalry begins between Rollin' 60s Neighborhood Crips and Eight Tray Gangster Crips, forcing many Crip sets to choose a side in the conflict between the two sets.

== 1980s ==
1983

- Rollin' 90s Neighborhood Crips form alliance with Rollin 60s Neighborhood Crips.

1984

- August 31: 4 members of professional football player Kermit Alexander's family are murdered by two members of the Rollin' 60s Neighborhood Crips in a home invasion.

1985

- Conflict between Kelly Park Compton Crips and Lueders Park Piru results in two murders.

1988

- January 30: Karen Toshima is killed in Westwood Village when a member of the Rollin' 60s Neighborhood Crips attempted to shoot a member of the rival Mansfield Hustler Crips.
- The movie Colors by Dennis Hopper is released, set in the context of the LA Gang Wars, Colors has been credited with taking gang culture into the mainstream.

== 1990s ==
1991

- The movie Boyz n the Hood is released, in which there are numerous references to the Crips and Bloods.

1992

- Representatives from several rival Blood and Crip sets, including the PJ Watts Crips and Bounty Hunter Bloods, agree to a truce.

1995

- Conflict between Nutty Blocc Compton Crips and Acacia Blocc Compton Crips results in four murders.

1996

- 7 September: Rapper Tupac Shakur is shot in a drive-by shooting in Las Vegas by South Side Compton Crips member Orlando Anderson, following an altercation with Anderson in the lobby of the MGM Grand. Shakur died from his injuries on 13 September.
- 9 September: In response to the shooting of Shakur, conflict erupted in Compton between the South Side Compton Crips and Mob Piru Bloods, resulting in 12 shootings and three deaths.

1997

- March 9: Christopher Wallace, also known as Biggie Smalls and The Notorious B.I.G., is shot dead in Los Angeles, with the prime suspect being Wardell "Poochie" Fouse, a member of the Mob Piru Bloods.
- June 1: Death Row Records employee and Mob Piru member Aaron Palmer is murdered.

== 2000s ==
2002

- April 3: Mob Piru member Alton McDonald is murdered by members of the Fruit Town Piru.
- October 16: Graphic designer Henry Smith, who designed the logo for Death Row Records, is murdered by a member of the Denver Lane Bloods.

2003

- July 24: Mob Piru member Wardell Fouse is murdered in a drive-by shooting by members of the Fruit Town Piru.

2009

- Rivalry begins between Mob Piru Bloods and Lueders Park Piru Bloods.

== 2010s ==
2017

- Murder of Justin Holmes by members of the Rollin' 90s Crips.

2019

- Murder of rapper Nipsey Hussle, who was a member of the Rollin 60s Neighborhood Crips.

== 2020s ==
2022

- April 3: Shootout in Sacramento between members of the Crips and Bloods results in six deaths.
