= Murder of Aaron Palmer =

1997 murder in Compton, California

- Location: Compton, California
- Date: June 1, 1997
- Attack type: Shooting
- Weapons: 9mm Pistol & .45 caliber pistol
- No. of participants: 3
- Motive: Gang rivalry

On June 1, 1997, Death Row Records employee and Lueders Park Piru member Aaron "Heron" Palmer (October 8, 1962 - June 1, 1997), was shot dead in Compton, California. Palmer's death was followed by the murders of several other Mob Pirus from Suge Knight's inner circle, as part of a gang war between the Mob Piru and another Bloods set (subgroup), the Fruit Town Piru.

== Background ==
=== Death Row Records and gang violence ===
As the CEO of Death Row Records, Suge Knight was known for hiring gang members from various Bloods sets (subgroups), including Mob Piru, Lueders Park Piru, and Fruit Town Piru. Aaron Palmer was a member of the Lueders Park Piru, a gang which Suge Knight was also affiliated with. Palmer worked as a bodyguard for Knight.

On September 7, 1996, Palmer participated in the beating of Orlando Anderson in the MGM Grand, along with Suge Knight, Tupac Shakur, and several other members of the Mob Piru Bloods. Anderson was a member of the South Side Compton Crips who had attacked a member of Suge Knight's inner circle several months prior, and was coincidently present in the MGM Grand at the same time as Knight's entourage.

=== Firing of George "G" Williams ===
In the summer of 1996, George "G" Williams, who worked as a bodyguard at Death Row Records, was fired by Suge Knight for failing to return two Death Row Records cars which he had borrowed. This was followed by the attempted murder of George Williams, who was shot in the buttocks when several other bodyguards from Death Row Records attempted to kidnap him. Following this incident, Williams became associated with Fruit Town Piru member Rodrick Cardale “Lil Rod” Reed, who was an enemy of Suge Knight. The pair are alleged to be behind the murders of several people from Suge Knight's inner circle over the subsequent years.

== Murder of Aaron “Heron” Palmer ==
On the evening of June 1, 1997, Palmer was driving home after a Death Row Records party at Gonzales Park, Compton. While Palmer was waiting at a red light, a blue 1992 Dodge Caravan stopped behind his vehicle. Two men came out of the minivan and ran up to Palmer’s vehicle on foot and fired multiple shots at Palmer, who died of his wounds.

=== Reactions ===
Bobby Ladd, an officer from the Compton Police Department, was surprised by the murder of Aaron Palmer, stating:

When Heron went down, we were all like, ‘Whoa! What’s going on here?’ Until that moment, nobody ever had the nerve to take out anyone in Suge’s inner circle. This was no ordinary murder. Someone was sending a message.

== Depictions in media ==
- Palmer is mentioned in the song To Live & Die in L.A. (1996) by Tupac Shakur, as "Heron".
- Palmer is portrayed in two episodes of Unsolved (2018) by Dwayne Marion Johnson.

== See also ==
- Murder of Alton McDonald
- Murder of Henry Smith
