= Rodrick Cardale Reed =

American gang member

- Organization: Fruit Town Piru
- Known for: Alleged murder of several Death Row Records employees Manufacturing and distributing PCP
- Penalty: Life imprisonment

Rodrick Cardale "Lil Rod" Reed is an American drug dealer and gang member who is alleged to be responsible for the murder of several Death Row Records employees between the years 1997 and 2003. The series of murders is believed to be motivated by a rivalry between Reed and the CEO of Death Row Records, Suge Knight. While never charged with murder, Reed was sentenced to life in prison in 2006 for the manufacture and distribution of PCP.

== Criminal activities ==
=== Feud with Suge Knight and murder of Death Row Records employees ===
Reed was a member of the Fruit Town Piru Bloods, the members of which were hired as employees at Death Row Records by Suge Knight. Despite this relationship between the Fruit Town Piru and Death Row Records, Reed held Knight responsible for the murder of a friend.

In 1996, former Death Row Records employee George Williams became associated with Reed, following a falling out with Suge Knight. Williams had been fired by Knight for failing to return two cars which he borrowed, and survived an attempt on his life by Knight's associates. Subsequently, Reed and Williams are alleged to have carried out a series of murders between 1997 and 2003, targeting members of the Mob Piru Bloods who were part of Knight's inner circle.

The pair are alleged to be responsible for the murders of Aaron Palmer, Alton McDonald, and Wardell Fouse.

=== PCP manufacturing and distribution ===
During the early 2000s, Reeds ran a PCP manufacturing and distribution operation in Southern California. The operation involved the use of a rolling PCP lab, which law enforcement described as one of the largest ever found.

== Arrest and imprisonment ==
Reed was among 26 people arrested in 2003, in relation to the PCP operation. Federal agents had wiretapped Reed's phone and over 18 months, obtained evidence implicating him in the manufacture and distribution of PCP. 175 kg of PCP, along with weapons and cash were confiscated during raids.

Reed's attorney stated that there was nothing in the wiretaps which implicated Reed in any murder:

There was nothing on the wiretaps to indicate he was complicit to a violent act. If they didn’t hear one conversation about a homicide on those 5,000 phone calls, I’d imagine there’s nothing there.

For his role in the PCP ring, Reed was sentenced to life in prison in 2006. However, he was not convicted of any of the murders which he has been implicated in.
