= Cedar Block Piru =

American crime gang

- Cedar Block Piru graffiti
- Territory: West side of Compton, Los Angeles, California, Newark, New Jersey, Norfolk, Virginia, Richmond, Virginia
- Ethnicity: Primarily African-American
- Allies: Fruit Town Piru; West Side Piru; Tree Top Piru; Campanella Park Piru
- Rivals: Mob Piru; Palmer Blocc Compton Crips
- Notable members: The Game

The Cedar Block Piru is a "set" of the Piru gang alliance, which itself is part of the larger Bloods gang alliance. The gang gained notability for its connection to rapper The Game, who has referenced the gang in several of his songs.

== History ==
=== Formation ===
The Cedar Block Piru formed around 1980 in the west side of Compton. The name was derived from a residential street called Cedar Street.

=== 1992 murder of Allen King ===
In December 1992, two soldiers from Fort Lewis, Washington, aided Cedar Block Piru members in the murder of Allen King and his three children. King and his three children were stabbed to death by members of the Cedar Block Piru, who were driven to King's house by the two soldiers. It is believed the gang targeted King because they believed that King reported the gang for operating a drug house.

== Notable members ==
- The Game joined the Cedar Block Piru when he was in high school, although his parents were members of the Crips. One source states that his parents were from the Santana Blocc Compton Crips, while another source claims his mother was from Hoover Street Crips, while his father was from the Nutty Blocc Compton Crips. Furthermore, two of his older half-brothers from the Nutty Blocc Compton Crips were murdered.
- Big Fase 100, an older half-brother of The Game, was also a member of the Cedar Block Piru.
