= South Side Compton Crips =

Gang in southern California

- South Side Compton Crips graffiti
- Years active: 1970s–present
- Ethnicity: Primarily African-American
- Allies: Atlantic Drive Compton Crips; Nutty Blocc Compton Crips
- Rivals: Mob Piru; Fruit Town Piru; Lueders Park Piru; Santana Blocc Compton Crips; Neighbourhood Compton Crips
- Notable members: Orlando "Baby Lane" Anderson; Duane "Keffe D" Davis

The South Side Compton Crips (also known as the South Side Crips) are a "set" of the Crips gang alliance, based in Compton, California. This gang is known for the murder of Tupac Shakur.

== History ==
=== Formation ===
During the 1970s, most of Compton and the territory east of Long Beach Boulevard was dominated by the Kelly Park Compton Crips and Neighbourhood Compton Crips. The only unclaimed territory was the area west of Long Beach Boulevard, which is where the South Side Compton Crips formed.

During the crack epidemic, the South Side Compton Crips operated numerous drug houses throughout their territory.

=== Death of Tupac Shakur ===
On September 7, 1996, a violent altercation involving the South Side Compton Crips escalated into the shooting of Tupac Shakur. This incident is often cited as a pivotal event that intensified gang rivalries in the area.

In 1996, a group of South Side Compton Crips including Orlando Anderson attacked Trevon Lane, a Mob Piru Blood, at Lakewood Mall. During the altercation, Anderson allegedly stole Lane's gold Death Row medallion, which was a gift from Suge Knight.

On September 7, 1996, Tupac Shakur, Suge Knight and several associates of Death Row Records, including Lane, went to Las Vegas to attend the Bruce Seldon vs. Mike Tyson boxing match. After the match, the Death Row entourage were walking in the lobby of the MGM Grand Hotel, when Shakur spotted Anderson. Shakur asked Anderson "You from the South?" Then Shakur punched Anderson, knocking him to the ground and the rest of the Death Row entourage continued beating him.

After the fight, MGM security guards and Las Vegas police tried to persuade Anderson to file a complaint, but he declined. Anderson caught a taxi to the Treasure Island Hotel, where several other South Side Compton Crips were staying. At the hotel, Anderson and the other Crips allegedly agreed to shoot Shakur after his scheduled performance at Club 662.

Several hours after this fight, Shakur and Knight were on their way to Club 662, which was owned by Knight. While their vehicle was at a red light, a white Cadillac stopped next to them and an occupant of the Cadillac opened fire with a handgun. Shakur was hit four times and taken to University Medical Center of Southern Nevada, where he died six days later.

=== Subsequent gang war and investigation ===
The South Side Compton Crips allegedly celebrated the murder of Shakur and a gang war erupted between the Bloods and Crips in Compton. Starting from September 9, 12 shootings occurred, resulting in three fatalities. In response to this violence, the police conducted raids of the houses of known gang members. Orlando Anderson was arrested and questioned by Compton police for a separate murder on October 2, but was released due to a lack of substantive evidence linking him to the murder.

On May 29, 1998, Anderson and his friend Michael Dorrough confronted Michael Stone and Jerry Stone, two members of the Corner Poccet Crips, as Anderson believed Michael owed his uncle money. A gunfight erupted, resulting in the deaths of Anderson, Michael and Jerry, and the injury of Dorrough.

The police investigation in 2009 suggested that the individuals involved in the murder of Shakur were connected to the South Side Compton Crips. Allegations also arose regarding financial motivations related to other individuals, highlighting ongoing conflicts in the hip-hop community.

In 2009, an investigation led by detective Greg Kading established that the occupants of the white Cadillac were members of the South Side Crips and that the shooter was Orlando Anderson. During the interview, Anderson's uncle, Duane Davis stated:

"[Orlando Anderson] leaned over and rolled down the window and popped him".

Furthermore, based on statements provided by Davis, Kading also alleges that Sean Combs offered the South Side Compton Crips $500,000 to kill Shakur and another $500,000 to kill Knight. However, Combs denies these allegations.

=== Murder of Yetunde Price ===
On September 14, 2003, two members of the South Side Compton Crips opened fire on an SUV containing Yetunde Price and her boyfriend, fatally wounding Price. Price was the personal assistant and oldest half-sister of tennis players Venus and Serena Williams. The two gang members believed they were protecting a drug house from a rival gang, the Lime Hood Piru Bloods.
