= Wardell Fouse =

Bloods gang member implicated in the murder of the Notorious B.I.G. (1960–2003)

- Fouse in an undated photograph
- Born: July 22, 1960; Kentucky, U.S.
- Died: July 24, 2003 (aged 43); Compton, California, U.S.
- Cause of death: Gunshot wounds
- Resting place: Inglewood Park Cemetery
- Other name: Darnell Bolton
- Occupations: Gang member, bodyguard
- Organization: Death Row Records
- Known for: Prime suspect in the murder of the Notorious B.I.G.
- Allegiance: Mob Piru Bloods

Wardell Fouse (July 22, 1960 – July 24, 2003), also known as Darnell Bolton and Poochie, was an American gang member implicated in the 1997 murder of the Notorious B.I.G. Fouse belonged to the California-based gang known as the Mob Piru Bloods. Since Fouse was deceased by the time his alleged involvement became known to the investigating police, no charges were filed against him.

== Early life and criminal activities ==
Wardell Fouse was born in Kentucky and moved to Compton, California on Bradfield Avenue with his family, where he became a member of the Mob Pirus, a "set" (subgroup) of the Bloods street gang, and acquired the nickname "Poochie." Suge Knight, whom Fouse would become close friends with, was also affiliated with this Bloods set.

On February 11, 1975, 14-year-old Fouse fired a shotgun at the house of Sophronia Johnson after losing a fight with her son. When he was interviewed by the police the next day, Fouse admitted that he fired the shotgun.

In January 1991, Fouse and his stepbrother, Floyd Damon Boyd, were wanted for their suspected involvement in a home invasion in San Bernardino, in which a man was murdered and his girlfriend was shot in the head and left to die.

In 1994, Reggie Wright Jr., who would later become the head of security at Death Row Records, arrested Fouse for the possession of one pound (0.45 kg) of cocaine and an assault weapon.

== Death Row Records ==
Fouse worked as a bodyguard at Death Row Records. Sometime before the murder of The Notorious B.I.G., Knight purchased a Chevrolet Impala for Fouse.

Danny Boy, an artist at Death Row Records, described Fouse in an interview:

"He definitely was a killer. He looked like it. He acted like it when he came in the room. It was something about him. He wasn't a tall man. He wasn't big, nothing like that. To me he looked like that he wasn't the one to fuck with."

=== Murder of William "Rat" Ratcliffe ===
In his book Murder Rap, former detective Greg Kading claims that in 1995, an aspiring rapper from the Bounty Hunters Bloods named William "Rat" Ratcliffe was pressuring Suge Knight to sign him to Death Row Records. At one point, Ratcliffe, along with 10 other Bounty Hunter Bloods, cornered Knight in a bathroom. After this incident, Ratcliffe was murdered by Fouse on the orders of Knight, who allegedly commented, "He doesn't fuck around. That's how I want him to do it," referring to Fouse.

== Murder of the Notorious B.I.G. and investigation ==
=== Shooting of Christopher Wallace ===
At 12:30 am on March 9, 1997 (PST), rapper Christopher Wallace (known by his stage name the Notorious B.I.G.), was leaving an after-party hosted by Vibe Magazine and Qwest Records at the Petersen Automotive Museum. The party had been closed down by the Los Angeles Fire Department because of overcrowding. Wallace and his entourage were leaving in two SUVs, with Wallace sitting in the front seat of the second vehicle and Wallace's associate Sean Combs (then known by his stage name Puff Daddy) sitting in the lead vehicle.

At 12:45 am (PST), Wallace's SUV stopped at a red light on the corner of Wilshire Boulevard and South Fairfax Avenue, the lead vehicle containing Combs having proceeded through the intersection. A dark-colored Chevrolet Impala SS pulled up next to the vehicle carrying Wallace. The driver of the Impala, who was described as a black man, drew a 9mm-caliber handgun and fired multiple shots at Wallace's vehicle. Wallace was hit by four bullets and was rushed to Cedars-Sinai Medical Center, where he was pronounced dead at 1:15 am (PST).

Charges were never brought against Fouse or Knight and the task force disbanded for reasons of "internal affairs".

=== 1997 investigation by Russell Poole ===
Following Wallace's death, there was much speculation that the murder was linked to the shooting of Tupac Shakur, which occurred six months earlier in Las Vegas. Both Wallace and Shakur were central figures in the East Coast–West Coast hip hop feud. Detective Russell Poole of the LAPD led the initial investigation of the murder. After several months of investigating, Poole suspected that Suge Knight had hired LAPD officer David Mack, as well as Mack's friend Amir Muhammad, to carry out the murder. Muhammad, who was not an official suspect at the time, came forward to clear his name. Poole sent his findings to the then-chief of the Los Angeles Police Department, Bernard C. Parks, who ordered Poole to cease all investigations of Officer David Mack. In protest of Parks' and the LAPD's handling of the case, Poole retired from the department in late 1999. As a result, the case stalled.

=== 2006 investigation by Greg Kading ===
Eventually, the case was reopened in 2006 and was led by LAPD detective Greg Kading. His investigation concluded that Wallace was shot by Fouse, whom Suge Knight contacted through his then-girlfriend, Theresa Swann.

After Swann confessed to being involved in the murder, the FBI sent her to meet Suge Knight in prison while wearing a body-wire in order to extract a confession from him. However, Knight did not say anything incriminating during the visit, and he was never charged in Wallace's murder.

== Death ==
Fouse survived a murder attempt in 2000. Fouse was killed in Compton on July 24, 2003, after he was shot ten times in the back as he rode his motorcycle. Detective Greg Kading has suggested that Fouse was killed as a result of a feud between two Blood sets, stating:

He was supposedly killed as a result of in-fighting between the Mob Pirus (Suge's Blood associates) and another Blood gang known as the Fruit Town Pirus.

In their book Once Upon a Time in Compton, Tim Brennan and Robert Ladd claim that Fouse was killed on orders from Rodrick Cardale "Lil Rod" Reed from Fruit Town Piru. An AK-47 was used in the shooting.

== Depictions in media ==
- In Episode 10 of Unsolved (2018), the shooting death of Fouse is depicted. He is portrayed by Harry Fowler. When police officer Tim Brennan (Scott Michael Campbell) arrives at the crime scene and recognises Fouse, he states, "One of Compton's finest. They call him Poochie."
- In the movie City of Lies (2018), he is mentioned by Commander Fasulo (Peter Greene), who tells Jack (Forest Whitaker) that Wardell Fouse was a "Mob Piru who Suge Knight paid to kill Biggie." Furthermore, an image of Fouse is visible on Detective Poole's (Johnny Depp) wall when Jack enters Poole's apartment.
