= Murder of Henry Smith =

2002 shooting in California, US

- Location: Vermont Vista, Los Angeles
- Date: October 16, 2002
- Weapon: Pistol
- Perpetrator: Unidentified member of the Denver Lane Bloods
- Motive: Gang rivalry

On October 16, 2002, Death Row Records employee Henry "Hendog" Smith was murdered in a drive-by shooting in Vermont Vista, Los Angeles. Smith was a close friend of Suge Knight and was known for designing the logo of Death Row Records. During the time of Smith's murder, the Mob Piru Bloods affiliated with Death Row Records were embroiled in a gang war with another Bloods set known as the Fruit Town Piru, which resulted in the deaths of several of Suge Knight's associates. However, investigators attributed Smith's murder to the Denver Lane Bloods, rather than the Fruit Town Piru.

== Background ==
As the CEO of Death Row Records, Suge Knight hired gang members from several Bloods sets (subgroups), including the Mob Piru, Fruit Town Piru, and Lueders Park Piru. By the early 2000s, a rivalry had formed between the Mob Piru and Fruit Town Piru, which resulted in the murder of several Mob Piru Bloods affiliated with Death Row Records, including Aaron "Heron" Palmer and Alton "Buntry" McDonald.

== Murder ==
On October 16, 2002, at 2:30 p.m. PST, Henry Smith was sitting in his parked vehicle in Vermont Vista, Los Angeles, as his girlfriend used a payphone. Witnesses described seeing a young man walking up to Smith's car, firing five or six shots into the car, then fleeing on a bicycle. His girlfriend's baby was in the car at the time of the shooting, but was unharmed.

== Aftermath ==
On October 22, 2002, Mob Piru members Timothy "Tim Roo" McDonald and Darryl "Biggie" Small attempted to kill a member of the Denver Lane Bloods in Compton, in retaliation for the death of Henry Smith. McDonald and Small drove to 112th and Vernon Avenue, Compton, where McDonald pointed a handgun out his window, at a man on the sidewalk. However, Small spotted a police patrol car and alerted McDonald, who pulled his handgun back inside.

The pair fled the scene in their vehicle, but were arrested after a short pursuit. The intended victim of the attempted murder was never located or identified.
