= Slippin': Ten Years with the Bloods =

Slippin:
- Directed by: Joachim Schroeder; Tommy Sowards
- Written by: Joachim Schroeder; Tommy Sowards
- Produced by: Joachim Schroeder; Tommy Sowards
- Narrated by: Lemar "Low Down"
- Cinematography: Josh Fox
- Edited by: Christopher Koefoed; Verena Schoenauer
- Production company: Kino International
- Distributed by: Kino Video
- Release date: April 23, 2005 (Tribeca Film Festival)
- Running time: 84 minutes
- Country: United States
- Language: English

Slippin: Ten Years with the Bloods is a 2005 American documentary written and directed by Joachim Schroeder and Tommy Sowards. Debuting at the 2005 Tribeca film festival the film follows a few members of the notorious Los Angeles gang Bloods for 10 years, showing what life is really like on the inside.

== Cast ==
- K.K. Calvin as himself
- Jumbo Chris as himself
- Dig Dug Douglas as himself
- C.K. Michael Johnson as himself
- Low Down Lemar as himself
