= Murder of the Notorious B.I.G. =

1997 crime in Los Angeles, California, US

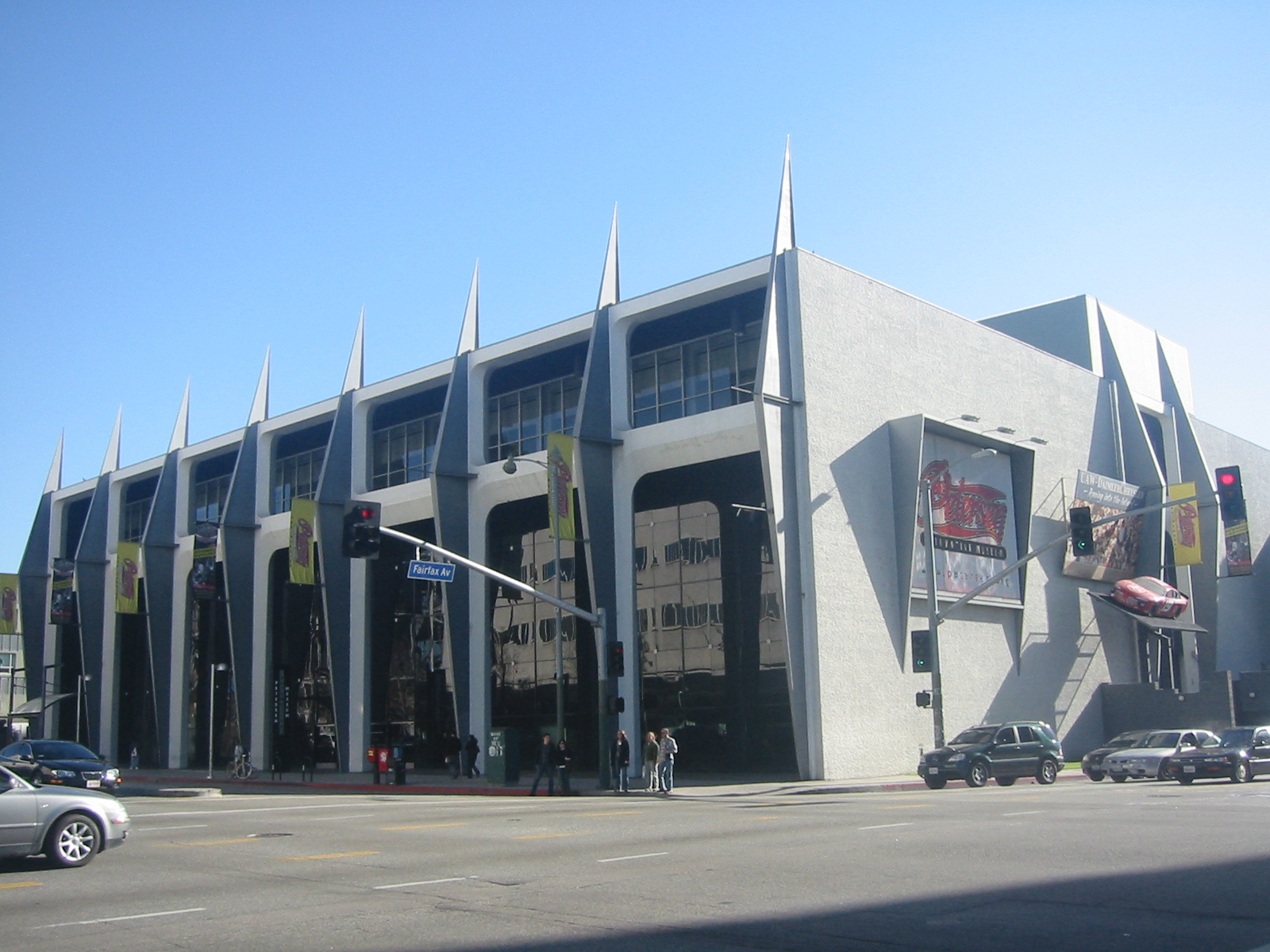
- Petersen Automotive Museum in 2006
- Location: 34°03′46.0″N 118°21′41.2″W; Los Angeles, California, U.S.
- Date: March 9, 1997; 29 years ago 12:47 a.m. (PST; UTC−08:00)
- Target: The Notorious B.I.G. or Sean Combs
- Attack type: Murder by drive-by shooting
- Weapon: Unidentified 9mm pistol
- Deaths: 1 (The Notorious B.I.G.)

On March 9, 1997, 24-year-old American rapper Christopher Wallace, known professionally as the Notorious B.I.G., or Biggie Smalls, was murdered in a drive-by shooting. He was pronounced dead at 1:15 AM in Los Angeles. Wallace's mother, Voletta Wallace, and his widow, Faith Evans, identified his body. Prior to the event, Wallace promoted his second studio album Life After Death, and attended an after-party in Los Angeles instead of taking a scheduled trip to London.

In 2007, Wallace's mother, Voletta Wallace; his widow, Faith Evans; and his children, T'yanna Jackson and C. J. Wallace, filed a $400 million wrongful death lawsuit against the Los Angeles Police Department (LAPD) alleging that corrupt officers were responsible for Wallace's death. Retired LAPD officer Greg Kading alleged that Suge Knight, the head of Death Row Records, orchestrated the murder in revenge for the September 1996 murder of Tupac Shakur in a similar drive-by shooting, with Wardell "Poochie" Fouse being named as the alleged shooter.

== Prior events ==
Christopher Wallace traveled to Los Angeles, California, in February 1997 to promote his upcoming second studio album, Life After Death, and to film a music video for its lead single "Hypnotize". On March 5, he gave a radio interview to The Dog House on San Francisco's KYLD in which he stated that he had hired security because he feared for his safety. Wallace mentioned that he had done so not only because of the ongoing East Coast–West Coast hip-hop feud and the murder of Tupac Shakur six months prior, but because security was simply a necessity for high-profile celebrities. Life After Death was scheduled for release on March 25, 1997.

On March 7, Wallace presented an award to Toni Braxton at the 1997 Soul Train Music Awards and was booed by some of the audience. According to journalist Justin Tinsley, he was scheduled to travel to London the next morning. Instead, on the evening of March 8, he and the Bad Boy Records entourage attended an after-party hosted by Vibe magazine, Qwest Records and Tanqueray Gin at the Petersen Automotive Museum in the Carthay Circle neighborhood of Los Angeles. Other guests included Faith Evans, Queen Latifah, Aaliyah, Chris Tucker, the Wayans brothers, Ginuwine, Irv Gotti, Jewell, Jermaine Dupri, The Lox, Da Brat, Xscape, Missy Elliott, Timbaland, Goodie Mob, Martin Lawrence, Kenny Burns, Russell Simmons, Ricky Bell, DJ Clue, J-Flexx, Clark Kent, DJ Quik, Ed Lover, Grant Hill, Tamia and members of the Bloods and Crips gangs. More than 1,000 people were in attendance. The Los Angeles Fire Department closed the party early because of smoking, loud music and overcrowding.

== Shooting ==
On March 9, 1997, at 12:30 a.m. PST, Wallace and his entourage left the Petersen in two green 1997 Chevrolet and GMC Suburbans to attend an after-party at Steve Stoute's house in the Hollywood Hills. Wallace traveled in the front passenger seat alongside his associates Damion "D-Roc" Butler, Junior M.A.F.I.A. member Lil' Cease, and driver Gregory "G-Money" Young. Sean Combs traveled in the other vehicle with Eugene "Gene" Deal, Anthony "Tone" Jacobs, Stevie J and driver Kenny Story. The two SUVs were trailed by a Chevrolet Blazer carrying Bad Boy Records' director of security, Paul Offord, and driven by an off-duty Inglewood police officer named Reggie Blaylock.

By 12:45 a.m., the streets were crowded with people leaving the museum. Wallace's SUV stopped at a red light at the corner of Wilshire Boulevard and South Fairfax Avenue, 50 yards (46 meters) away. A dark-colored 1994–1996 Chevrolet Impala SS drove to the side of Wallace's Suburban. The driver of the Impala, a black male wearing a light blue suit and bow tie, lowered his window, drew a 9 mm pistol and fired six shots into the Suburban. Biggie was hit by four bullets. Wallace's entourage rushed him to Cedars-Sinai Medical Center, where doctors performed an emergency thoracotomy, but he was pronounced dead at 1:15 a.m. at the age of 24.

== Aftermath ==
Wallace's autopsy report was released to the public in December 2012, fifteen years after his death. According to the report, three of the four shots were not fatal. The first bullet hit his left forearm and traveled down to his wrist, the second hit him in the back, missing all vital organs and exiting through his left shoulder, and the third hit his left thigh and exited through his inner thigh. The report specified that the third bullet struck "the left side of the scrotum, causing a very shallow, 3/8 in [10 mm] linear laceration". The fourth bullet was fatal, entering through Wallace's right hip and striking several vital organs, including his colon, liver, heart and the upper lobe of his left lung before stopping in his left shoulder area. Wallace's death was mourned by fellow hip-hop artists and fans worldwide. A service was held at Frank E. Campbell Funeral Chapel attended by Queen Latifah, Flavor Flav, Lil Kim, Pepa of Salt-N-Pepa, and former New York Mayor David N. Dinkins. American rapper Nas felt that Wallace's death, along with that of Shakur, was "nearly the end of rap".

== Investigation ==
=== 1997–2002: Initial investigations, LAbyrinth, and Biggie & Tupac ===
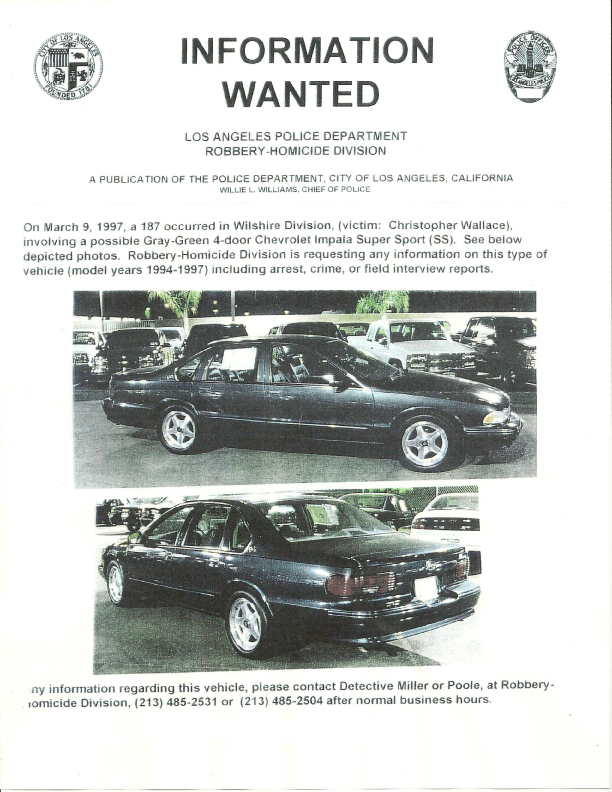
A wanted poster put out by the LAPD regarding the vehicle possibly used by the perpetrators

Immediately following the shooting, reports surfaced linking Wallace's murder with that of Shakur's six months earlier, due to similarities in the drive-by shootings and the highly publicized East Coast–West Coast hip hop feud, of which Shakur and Wallace had been central figures. Media reports had previously speculated that Wallace was in some way connected to Shakur's murder, though no evidence ever surfaced to seriously implicate him. Shortly after Wallace's death, Los Angeles Times writers Chuck Philips and Matt Lait reported that the key suspect in his murder was a member of the Southside Crips acting out of a personal financial motive, rather than on the gang's behalf; however, the investigation stalled, and no one was ever formally charged.

In a 2002 book by Randall Sullivan, called LAbyrinth, information was compiled about the murders of Wallace and Shakur based on information provided by retired LAPD detective Russell Poole. In the book, Sullivan accused Marion "Suge" Knight, co-founder of Death Row Records and a known Bloods affiliate, of conspiring with corrupt Los Angeles Police Department (LAPD) officer David Mack to kill Wallace and make both deaths appear to be the result of the rap rivalry. The book stated that one of Mack's alleged associates, Amir Muhammad, was the hitman who killed Wallace. The theory was based on evidence provided by an informant named Psycho Mike, as well as the general resemblance of Muhammad to the facial composite generated during the investigation.

In 2002, filmmaker Nick Broomfield released a documentary, Biggie & Tupac, based on information from the book. The New York Times described Broomfield's documentary as a "largely speculative" and "circumstantial" account relying on flimsy evidence, failing to "present counter-evidence" or "question sources". Moreover, the motive suggested for the murder of Wallace in the documentary—to decrease suspicion for the Shakur shooting six months earlier—was, as the Times put it, "unsupported in the film".

=== 2005–2006: Re-opened investigation ===
An article published in Rolling Stone by Sullivan in December 2005 accused the LAPD of not fully investigating leads concerning Death Row Records based on Poole's evidence. He claimed that Combs "failed to fully cooperate with the investigation", and according to Poole, encouraged Bad Boy staff to do the same. The accuracy of the article was later challenged in a letter by the assistant managing editor of the Los Angeles Times, who accused Sullivan of using "shoddy tactics." Sullivan, in response, quoted the lead attorney of the Wallace estate calling the newspaper "a co-conspirator in the cover-up".

In alluding to Sullivan and Poole's theory that formed the basis of the Wallace family's dismissed $500 million lawsuit against the City of Los Angeles, The New York Times wrote: "A cottage industry of criminal speculation has sprung up around the case, with documentaries, books and a stream of lurid magazine articles implicating gangs, crooked cops and a cross-country rap rivalry," noting that everything associated with Wallace's death had been "big business". More recently, the 2018 film City of Lies was produced based on Poole's investigation and Sullivan's book, and cast Johnny Depp as Poole.

The Los Angeles Times printed conflicting theories of the murder in different sections of the paper. The Metro section of the Times reported that police suspected a connection between Wallace's death and the Rampart police corruption scandal, consistent with Sullivan and Poole's theory. The Metro section also ran a photo of Muhammad, identified by police as a mortgage broker unconnected to the murder who appeared to match details of the gunman, printing his name and driver's license. However, Chuck Philips, a staff writer for the Business section of the Times, searched for Muhammad, whom the Metro reporters could not find for comment. It took only three days to find Muhammad, who had a current ad for his brokerage business running in the Times.

Muhammad, who was not an official suspect at the time, came forward to clear his name. The Metro section of the paper was opposed to running a retraction, but the business desk editor, Mark Saylor, said, "Chuck is sort of the world's authority on rap violence" and pushed, along with Chuck Philips, for the Times to retract the article. In a correction article written by Philips in May 2000, Muhammad was quoted as saying, "I'm a mortgage broker, not a murderer" and asking, "How can something so completely false end up on the front page of a major newspaper?" The story cleared Muhammad's name. A later 2005 story by Chuck Philips alleged that an informant for the Poole-Sullivan theory, Psycho Mike, was a schizophrenic with admitted memory lapses who confessed to hearsay. John Cook of Brill's Content noted that Philips's article "demolished" the Poole-Sullivan theory of Wallace's murder. In the 2000 book The Murder of Biggie Smalls, investigative journalist and author Cathy Scott suggested that Wallace and Shakur's murders might have been the result of the East Coast–West Coast feud and motivated by financial gain for the record companies because the rappers were worth more dead than alive.

The criminal investigation into Wallace's murder was re-opened in July 2006 to look for new evidence to help the city defend the civil lawsuits brought by the Wallace family. Retired LAPD detective Greg Kading, who worked for three years on a gang task force that included the Wallace case, alleged that the rapper was shot by Wardell "Poochie" Fouse. Fouse, a Mob Piru gang member and an associate of Knight, died on July 24, 2003, after being shot in the back while riding his motorcycle in Compton. Kading believes Knight hired Fouse to kill Wallace to avenge the death of Shakur, via his girlfriend, Theresa Swann.

=== 2012–present: Autopsy release and Sean Combs: The Reckoning ===
In December 2012, the LAPD released the autopsy results conducted on Wallace's body to generate new leads. The release was criticized by the long-time lawyer of his estate, Perry Sanders Jr., who objected to an autopsy. The case remains officially unsolved, despite the evidence that was uncovered. On February 21, 2025, Wallace's mother Voletta died. She had played a prominent role in the effort to seek justice for Wallace after his death and on at least two occasions sued the city of Los Angeles on wrongful death claims related to the allegation about Mack having a role in Wallace's death. In December of 2025, 50 Cent's Netflix documentary miniseries Sean Combs: The Reckoning alleges that Sean "Diddy" Combs was inevitably responsible for the murder.

== Lawsuits ==
=== Wrongful death claim ===
In April 2002, Wallace's mother Voletta filed a wrongful death claim against the city of Los Angeles based on the evidence championed by Poole. Voletta claimed that the LAPD had sufficient evidence to arrest the gunman but failed to use it. Mack and Muhammad were originally named as defendants in the civil suit but were dropped shortly before the trial began after the LAPD and FBI dismissed them as suspects.

The case was presented to a jury on June 21, 2005. On the eve of the trial, Kevin Hackie, a key witness who was expected to testify, revealed that he had suffered memory lapses resulting from psychiatric medications. He had previously testified to knowledge of involvement between Knight, Mack and Muhammed but later said that Wallace's attorneys had altered his declarations to include words that he had never said. Hackie took full blame for filing a false declaration.

Several days into the trial, the plaintiffs' attorney disclosed to the court and opposing counsel that he had received a telephone call from someone claiming to be an LAPD officer who provided detailed information about the existence of evidence concerning the Wallace murder. The court directed the city to conduct a thorough investigation, which uncovered previously undisclosed evidence, much of which was in the desk or cabinet of Detective Steven Katz, the lead detective in the Wallace investigation.

The documents centered around interviews by numerous police officers with an incarcerated informant who had been a cellmate of imprisoned Rampart officer Rafael Perez for an extended period of time. He reported that Perez had told him about his and Mack's involvement with Death Row Records and their activities at the Petersen Automotive Museum on the night of Wallace's murder. As a result of the newly discovered evidence, the judge declared a mistrial and awarded the Wallace family its attorneys' fees.

On April 16, 2007, relatives of Wallace filed a second wrongful death lawsuit against the city of Los Angeles. The suit also named two LAPD officers in the center of the investigation into the Rampart scandal, Perez and Nino Durden. According to the claim, Perez, an alleged affiliate of Death Row Records, admitted to LAPD officials that he and Mack (who was not named in the lawsuit) "conspired to murder, and participated in the murder of Christopher Wallace". The Wallace family claimed that the LAPD "consciously concealed Rafael Perez's involvement in the murder of ... Wallace."

United States district judge Florence-Marie Cooper granted summary judgment to the city on December 17, 2007, finding that the Wallace family had not complied with a California law that required the family to provide notice of its claim to the state within six months of Wallace's death. The Wallace family refiled the suit, dropping the state law claims on May 27, 2008. The suit against the city of Los Angeles was dismissed in 2010. It was described by The New York Times as "one of the longest running and most contentious celebrity cases in history". The Wallace suit had asked for $500 million from the city.

=== Defamation ===
On January 19, 2007, Tyruss "Big Syke" Himes, a friend of Shakur who was implicated in Wallace's murder by the Los Angeles Fox affiliate KTTV and XXL magazine in 2005, brought a defamation lawsuit regarding the accusations.

== See also ==
- Murder of Tupac Shakur
- List of murdered hip hop musicians
- List of homicides in California
- List of unsolved murders (1980–1999)
- Rampart scandal
