= Tupac Shakur: Before I Wake... =

- Release date: 2001
- Running time: 100 minutes
- Country: United States
- Language: English

Tupac Shakur: Before I Wake... is a 2001 documentary film about the last year of life of American rapper Tupac Shakur and his murder. The film features the recollection of Shakur's bodyguard, Frank Alexander, and behind the scenes studio footage of Shakur recording some of his songs and some previously unshown footage. The film also contains interviews of Eazy-E, Russell Simmon, Rev. Jesse Jackson, the Las Vegas reporter Cathy Scott, and the Las Vegas detective Becker.

The film's title, chosen by Alexander, comes from the Christian prayer "Now I Lay Me Down to Sleep" because Shakur was killed before he "fully awoke" (matured). At the same time, according to Alexander, Shakur was fully open to a new, positive direction for himself before his murder.
