= Why We Bang =

- Directed by: Clifford Jordan
- Produced by: Orlando Myrics, Cecil Holmes
- Distributed by: Ghetto Logik Entertainment
- Release date: December 3, 2006
- Running time: 75 min.
- Country: United States
- Language: English

Why We Bang is a 2006 independent documentary film that documents the historical background of Los Angeles' Bloods and Crips gangs. The film follows several current and former members of the Bloods and Crips of Los Angeles through interviews.

The objective of the film is stated by director Clifford Jordan as, "We just got tired of seeing people, not from our community making so called 'Hood movies' that did not really depict what our community was all about, our goal is to bring real images and real stories about real people to the big screen."

== Synopsis ==
Why We Bang starts by depicting a short history of African-American organizations and communities during the 1960s and 1970s such as the Black Panthers. It is then suggested that these organizations were "infiltrated by the CIA", eventually leading to the division of the then more unified African-American community, and again leading to the establishment of new violent street gangs.

After this interviews with several current and former members, and relatives, of the Los Angeles street gangs the Crips and Bloods are shown, with changing contexts. Questions range from why the interviewees are involved in gang activity, to the problems and trouble with the gangs, to if and how the problems can be solved.

A part of the film follows a number of mothers whose sons had been murdered by gang violence, with the mothers talking about their experiences and views. A Nation of Islam leader is also amongst those followed by interviews through the film.
