= Lueders Park Piru =

Part of the Bloods gang alliance

- Lueders Park Piru graffiti in Lueders Park, Compton
- Territory: East side of Compton, California
- Ethnicity: Primarily African-American
- Membership: Approximately 140 members in 2005
- Activities: Drug trafficking Robbery; Weapons sales
- Allies: Mob Piru (Before 2009)
- Rivals: Kelly Park Compton Crips; South Side Compton Crips; Santana Blocc Compton Crips

The Lueders Park Piru (also known as the Lueders Park Piru Bloods) are a "set" of the Piru gang alliance, which itself is part of the larger Bloods alliance. The Lueders Park Piru has its origins in the Lueders Park Hustlers, an independent street gang which was instrumental in the formation of the Bloods gang alliance in 1972.

== History ==
=== Formation of the Bloods ===
In 1972, several independent street gangs in Los Angeles formed an alliance known as the Bloods to counter the growing influence of the Crips. One of these independent street gangs which were instrumental in the formation of the Bloods alliance were the Lueders Park Hustlers, which would later become known as the Lueders Park Piru.

The gang got its name from Lueders Park, Compton, where the gang members would gather to use drugs, play basketball, and plan robberies.

=== Rivalry with Kelly Park Compton Crips ===
On December 27, 1985, 15-year-old Charles "Beeb" Stevens was shot dead in a drive-by shooting while standing in the territory of the Kelly Park Compton Crips. The Kelly Park Compton Crips held the Lueders Park Piru responsible for the death of Stevens, and in retaliation, killed 30-year-old Don Turner, who was a former member of the Lueders Park Piru.

=== Death Row Records ===
Suge Knight, who was the CEO of Death Row Records, was affiliated with the Mob Piru Bloods and hired gang members from several Bloods sets, including Lueders Park Piru.

Following the shooting of Death Row Records artist Tupac Shakur on September 7, 1996, a gang war broke out in Compton between the Mob Piru Bloods, and the South Side Compton Crips, who were responsible for Shakur's shooting. During this gang war, the Lueders Park Piru sided with the Mob Piru. As a result, George Mack, who was a member of the Lueders Park Piru, was shot and wounded on September 10, 1997.

=== Rivalry with Butler Blocc Crips ===
On July 4, 2005, Christopher "Bick Rock" Holt, along with two other members of the Lueders Park Piru, used AK-47s to open fire on a house in Butler Avenue, Compton. The house was located within the territory of the Lueders Park Piru, but was used as a "hang-out" by members of a rival gang known as the Butler Blocc Crips. The shooting resulted in the deaths of Mario Gordon and Corey Cartwright.

Christopher Holt was sentenced to life without the possibility of parole plus 90 years in prison for the two murders. Investigators concluded that the shooting was intended to let the Butler Blocc Crips know that they were not welcome in the territory of the Lueders Park Piru.

=== Rivalry with Mob Piru ===
Although the Lueders Park Piru were initially allies with the Mob Piru, the two gangs became enemies after the internal conflict resulting in multiple murders during the Death Row Records era. This led to a series of shootings between the two gangs from 2009 to 2013. The two gangs tried to end their rivalry, but were unsuccessful.

== Depictions in media ==
- The Lueders Park Piru are mentioned in the song Piru Love (1993) by the Bloods & Crips, in the line "Don't get caught in the Jungle's or a park called Lueders."
