= Unsolved (American TV series) =

2018 American television series

- Genre: True crime
- Created by: Kyle Long
- Based on: Murder Rap: The Untold Story of Biggie Smalls & Tupac Shakur Murder Investigations by Greg Kading
- Starring: Josh Duhamel; Bokeem Woodbine; Wavyy Jonez; Marcc Rose; Brent Sexton; Jimmi Simpson
- Composer: Joseph Trapanese
- Country of origin: United States
- Original language: English
- No. of episodes: 10

Production
- Executive producers: Anthony Hemingway; Mark Taylor; Greg Kading; Kyle Long
- Camera setup: Single-camera
- Production companies: HemingwayTaylor; Universal Cable Productions

Original release
- Network: USA Network
- Release: February 27 – May 1, 2018

Unsolved (also titled Unsolved: The Murders of Tupac and the Notorious B.I.G.) is an American true crime television miniseries, based on the 1996 murder of Tupac Shakur and the 1997 murder of The Notorious B.I.G. (aka Biggie Smalls). It premiered February 27, 2018 on USA Network.

== Premise ==
The 10-episode miniseries chronicles the dual police investigations of Detective Greg Kading (Josh Duhamel) and Detective Russell Poole (Jimmi Simpson) into the controversial murders of two of the rap industry's most legendary players, Tupac (Marcc Rose) and Biggie (Wavyy Jonez).

== Cast ==
- Wavyy Jonez as Christopher Wallace / Biggie Smalls / The Notorious B.I.G.
- Marcc Rose as Tupac Shakur
- Josh Duhamel as Det. Greg Kading
- Jimmi Simpson as Det. Russell Poole
- Bokeem Woodbine as Daryn Dupree
- Jamie McShane as Det. Fred Miller
- Brent Sexton as Det. Brian Tyndall
- Wendell Pierce as Det. Lee Tucker
- Luke James as Sean Combs
- Aisha Hinds as Voletta Wallace
- LeToya Luckett as Sharitha Golden
- Donald Faison as Jacques Agnant
- Woody McClain as Jimmy Henchman
- Maestro Harrell as Lil' Cease
- Funkmaster Flex as himself
- Lahmard Tate as Duane "Keffe D" Davis
- Mychal Thompson as Orlando Anderson
- Rhys Coiro as Jim Black
- Nakia Burrise as Sharon Gower
- Dominic L. Santana as Suge Knight
- Sola Bamis as Afeni Shakur
- Amirah Vann as Justine Simon
- Jamie Hector as Keffe D's lawyer
- Harry Fowler as Wardell "Poochie" Fouse

== Episodes ==
No.	Title	Directed by	Written by	Original release date	US viewers (millions)
1	"Wherever It Leads"	Anthony Hemingway	Kyle Long	February 27, 2018	1.60
2	"Nobody Talks"	Anthony Hemingway	Kyle Long	March 6, 2018	1.13
3	"The Mack"	Ernest Dickerson	Denitria Harris-Lawrence	March 13, 2018	1.01
4	"Take Your Best Shot"	Anthony Hemingway	Chris Downey	March 20, 2018	1.04
5	"The Art of War"	Kate Woods	Jameal Turner	March 27, 2018	0.95
6	"East Coast, West Coast"	Erica Watson	Tash Gray	April 3, 2018	0.84
7	"Half the Job"	Darren Grant	Samir Mehta	April 10, 2018	0.81
8	"Tupac Amaru Shakur"	Anthony Hemingway	Denitria Harris-Lawrence & Jameal Turner	April 17, 2018	0.76
9	"Christopher"	Kate Woods	Chris Downey	April 24, 2018	0.77
10	"Unsolved?"	Anthony Hemingway	Kyle Long	May 1, 2018	0.71

== Development ==
The series was ordered on May 12, 2017. Emmy winner Anthony Hemingway directed the pilot and executive produced the series, along with Mark Taylor through their Hemingway-Taylor production company. Kyle Long wrote the pilot and also executive produced. Greg Kading, who also served as co-executive producer, led multiple law-enforcement task forces investigating the murders and authored the book Murder Rap: The Untold Story of Biggie Smalls & Tupac Shakur Murder Investigations.

== Reception ==
=== Critical response ===
On the review aggregation website Rotten Tomatoes, the series holds an approval rating of 73% based on 26 reviews, with an average rating of 5.93/10. The website's critical consensus reads, "Unsolved's prestige aspirations don't always work in its procedural structure, but strong performances and an ambitious spirit to find truth in this real-world mystery create an engaging exploration of two of pop culture's most notorious influences." Metacritic, which uses a weighted average, assigned the series a score of 67 out of 100 based on 16 reviews, indicating "generally favorable reviews".

=== Ratings ===
Viewership and ratings per episode of Unsolved
No.	Title	Air date	Rating (18–49)	Viewers (millions)	DVR (18–49)	DVR viewers (millions)	Total (18–49)	Total viewers (millions)
1	"Wherever It Leads"	February 27, 2018	0.7	1.60	0.4	0.74	1.1	2.35
2	"Nobody Talks"	March 6, 2018	0.4	1.13	0.3	—N/a	0.7	—N/a
3	"The Mack"	March 13, 2018	0.4	1.01	0.3	—N/a	0.7	—N/a
4	"Take Your Best Shot"	March 20, 2018	0.4	1.04	0.3	—N/a	0.7	—N/a
5	"The Art of War"	March 27, 2018	0.4	0.95	—N/a	—N/a	—N/a	—N/a
6	"East Coast, West Coast"	April 3, 2018	0.3	0.84	0.3	—N/a	0.6	—N/a
7	"Half the Job"	April 10, 2018	0.3	0.81	0.3	—N/a	0.6	—N/a
8	"Tupac Amaru Shakur"	April 17, 2018	0.3	0.76	—N/a	—N/a	—N/a	—N/a
9	"Christopher"	April 24, 2018	0.3	0.77	0.3	—N/a	0.6	—N/a
10	"Unsolved?"	May 1, 2018	0.3	0.71	—N/a	—N/a	—N/a	—N/a
