= Kelly Park Compton Crips =

- Founding location: Kelly Park, Compton, CA
- Ethnicity: Primarily African-American
- Allies: Crips
- Rivals: Mob Piru; Elm Street Piru; Lueders Park Piru; Holly Hood Piru; Atlantic Drive Compton Crips
- Notable members: Eazy-E; MC Ren; Tweedy Bird Loc; Donald "AWOL" Stallworth

The Kelly Park Compton Crips (KPCC), formerly known as the Kelly Park Hustler Crips, are a "set" of the Crips gang alliance which originated in Kelly Park on the East Side of Compton, CA. The gang has gained notability for its connection with the rap group N.W.A, as members Eazy-E and MC Ren were both part of the Kelly Park Compton Crips. Bloods & Crips organizer Tweedy Bird Loc was also affiliated with this Crip set.

== History ==
=== Gang war with Lueders Park Piru ===
On December 27, 1985, 15-year-old Charles "Beeb" Stevens was shot dead in a drive-by shooting while standing in Kelly Park, Compton. Following the shooting of Stevens, members of the Kelly Park Compton Crips planned to retaliate by killing a member of the Lueders Park Piru, whom they held responsible for the shooting.

On December 29, 1985, former Lueders Park Piru member, 30-year-old Don Turner, was shot dead while standing in Lueders Park territory, apparently in random retaliation for the death of Stevens.

Following these two murders, a task force of 43 police officers launched a sweeping raid in Kelly Park, Compton, arresting 18-year-old Eric Darnell Garrett and 24-year-old Dennis Earl Reed as suspects in the killing of Turner. This was followed by the arrest of two 15-year-olds and one 14-year-old for their suspected involvement in the killing of Turner.

Charges were dropped against Dennis Earl Reed, while 21-year-old Kenneth Brown handed himself to the police and was charged for his role in the killing of Turner.

=== Gang injunction in Kelly Park ===
In July 1986, the Compton Police Department set up a police substation in Kelly Park due to the gang activity present in the area. The police prohibited people from wearing gang colors in Kelly Park, which included blue for Crips, red for Bloods, and green for the Lime Hood Piru. Following the implementation of the police substation, the number of criminal incidents in Kelly Park decreased significantly.

== Depictions in media ==
- The gang is referenced in several songs in the Bloods & Crips 1993 album Bangin' On Wax.
- In Straight Outta Compton (2015), Eazy-E's time as a drug dealer from the gang is depicted.
