= Murder of Alton McDonald =

2002 murder in Compton, California

- Location: Compton, California, U.S.
- Date: April 3, 2002
- Attack type: Shooting
- Weapon: .40 caliber pistol
- Motive: Rivalry between Mob Pirus and Fruit Town Pirus

On April 3, 2002, Alton "Buntry" McDonald (February 5, 1966 – April 3, 2002), a member of the Mob Piru Bloods and a production manager at Death Row Records, was shot dead at a gas station in Compton, California. The murder was believed to be the result of fighting between two rival "sets" of the Bloods, the Mob Pirus and the Fruit Town Pirus.

== Events ==
=== Background ===
McDonald was a close friend of Suge Knight, the former CEO of Death Row Records and worked as a production manager at the record label. McDonald was also a friend of Tupac Shakur and was involved in the beating of Orlando Anderson on September 7, 1996, at the MGM Grand, which occurred a few hours before Shakur was shot. He is the younger brother of another MOB Piru Gang Member, James "Mob James" MacDonald, who also worked for Death Row Records around this time. By 2002, a rivalry developed between two sets of the Bloods, the Mob Piru, which Death Row Records was affiliated with, and the Fruit Town Piru. Several associates of Death Row Records were killed as a result of this rivalry.

=== Shooting ===
On April 3, 2002, McDonald was filling up his car at a gas station in Compton, when a pickup truck pulled up near him. Allegedly, George Williams opened fire with a handgun and McDonald was hit several times in the chest. He was taken to St. Francis Medical Center in Lynwood, where he died shortly after. Later that day, Suge Knight visited the hospital to pay his respects to McDonald's family.

=== Aftermath ===
In June 2002, Eric "Scar" Daniel, who was suspected of being involved in the shooting death of Mcdonald, was shot and killed in retaliation of the murder of Alton "Buntry" Mcdonald.

In January 2003, Gary "Gary G" Phillips, who was allegedly involved in the shooting of McDonald, was shot and wounded by two of Suge Knight's associates, Terran Andrews and Gregory Shelton.

On July 28, 2005, George "G" Williams and Rodrick "Lil Rod" Reed, who were both persons of interest and allegedly involved in the shooting death of Mcdonald, were found guilty on federal drug and weapons charges and were later sentenced to life in prison months later. In 2021, George "G" Williams was released from prison.

== Depictions in media ==
- McDonald is mentioned in Tupac Shakur's song "To Live & Die in L.A." (1996), from his album The Don Killuminati: The 7 Day Theory.
- McDonald is portrayed in two episodes of Unsolved (2018), where he is played by Calvin Tenner.
