= Murder in Nevada law =

Aspect of Nevada criminal law

Murder in Nevada law constitutes the unlawful killing, under circumstances defined by law, of people within or under the jurisdiction of the U.S. state of Nevada.

The United States Centers for Disease Control and Prevention reported that in the year 2021, the state had a murder rate somewhat above the median for the entire country.

== Definitions ==
=== First degree murder ===
First degree murder is the most serious homicide offense in Nevada. It is defined as a murder committed under one of the following circumstances:

- Committed with premeditation or lying in wait
- Committed with torture of the victim
- Committed by means of poison
- Committed in the perpetration or attempted perpetration of a felony of a felony under Nevada's felony murder rule
- Committed to avoid or prevent an arrest, or to escape custody
- Committed on the property of a school, at an activity sponsored by a school, or on a school bus
- Committed in the perpetration or attempted perpetration of an act of terrorism

The penalties for first-degree murder are the death penalty, life without parole, 20 years to life, or at least 50 years in prison with parole after 20 years.

==== Felony murder rule ====
Under Nevada's felony murder rule, a death caused by the perpetration or attempted perpetration of one of the following felonies, regardless of intent to kill, is punished as first-degree murder:

- Sexual assault
- Rape
- Arson
- Robbery
- Burglary
- Invasion of the home
- Sexual abuse of a child
- Sexual molestation of a child under the age of 14 years
- Child abuse
- Abuse of an older person or vulnerable person

=== Second degree murder ===
Second-degree murder is the second most serious homicide offense in Nevada. It is defined as an intentional killing without premeditation, a killing where the perpetrator behaved so recklessly that death was a foreseeable result, or an unintentional death caused by the perpetrator supplying the victim illegal drugs. The penalties for second degree murder are 10 years to life, or 25 years in prison with parole after 10 years.

== Penalties ==
The penalties for homicide offenses in Nevada are listed below.

Offense	Mandatory sentence
First-degree murder	For adults: Death or; Life in prison without the possibility of parole or; 20 years to life or; or at least 50 years in prison with parole after 20 years; For juveniles: 20 years to life or; or at least 50 years in prison with parole after 20 years
Second-degree murder	10 years to life, or at least 25 years in prison with parole after 10 years
Involuntary manslaughter	1 to 4 years in prison
Voluntary manslaughter	1 to 10 years in prison

== See also ==
- List of homicides in Nevada
