= Bloods =

Street gang founded in Los Angeles

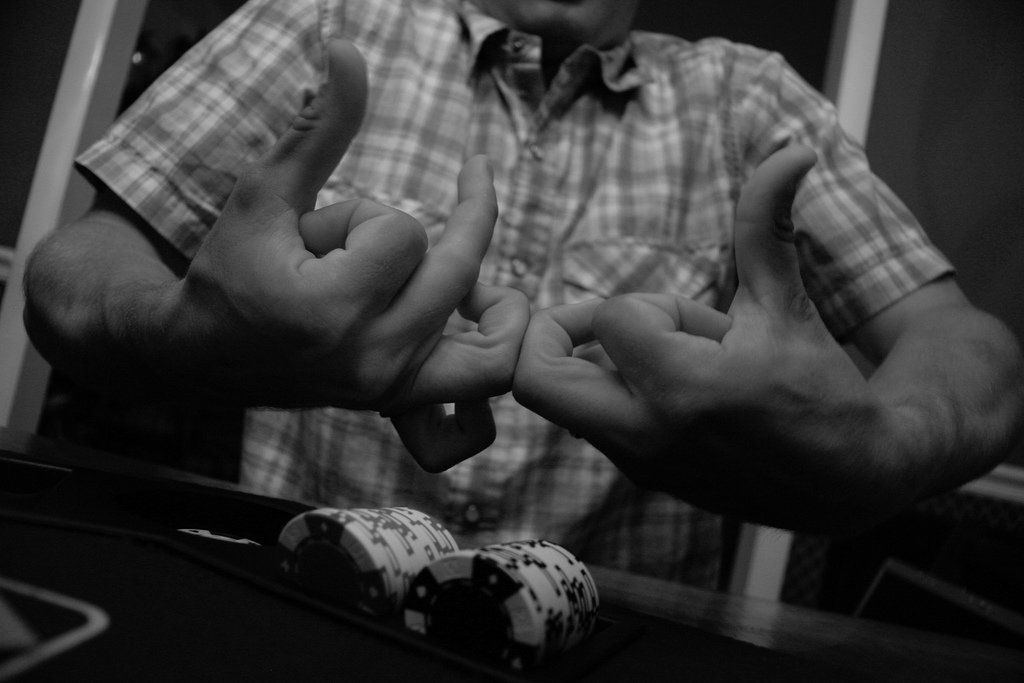
- The distinctive Blood gang signal
- Founded: ~Late 1960s
- Founders: Sylvester Scott and Benson Owens
- Founding location: Los Angeles, California, U.S.
- Years active: ~Late 1960s–present
- Territory: 33 U.S. states, 1 U.S. territory (Guam) and Canada
- Ethnicity: Predominantly African American
- Membership: 7,000–30,000
- Activities: Drug trafficking, assault, auto theft, burglary, carjacking, drive-by shootings, extortion, homicide, identity fraud, and robbery
- Allies: Black Guerrilla Family; Black P. Stones; CIA (late 20th century); Folk Nation; Italian-American Mafia (in New York); Juggalos; Latin Kings; Mongrel Mob; People Nation; United Blood Nation; Vice Lords
- Rivals: Crips; Aryan Brotherhood; Asian Boyz; Florencia 13; Folk Nation; Gangster Disciples; MS-13; Tiny Rascal Gang
- Notable members: Wardell Fouse; Suge Knight; Alton McDonald; Omar Portee; Cle Shaheed Sloan; Regis Deon Thomas; Skipp Townsend

The Bloods are a primarily African American street gang which was founded in Los Angeles, California. The gang is widely known for its rivalry with the Crips. It is identified by the red color worn by its members and by particular gang symbols, including distinctive hand signs.

The Bloods comprise various subgroups known as "sets", among which significant differences exist, such as colors, clothing, operations, and political ideas that may be in open conflict with each other. Since the gang's creation, it has branched throughout the United States.

== History ==
The Bloods gang was formed initially to compete against the influence of the Crips in Los Angeles. The rivalry originated in the late 1960s when Raymond Washington and other Crips attacked Sylvester Scott and Benson Owens, two students at Centennial High School in Compton, California. As a result, Scott formed the Piru Street Boys, the first "Bloods" gang. Owens subsequently established the West Piru gang. The Bloods was initially formed to provide members protection from the Crips. Many of the non-Crip gangs used to call one another "blood". On March 21, 1972, shortly after a concert featuring Wilson Pickett and Curtis Mayfield, 20 youths belonging to the Crips attacked and robbed Robert Ballou Jr. outside the Hollywood Palladium. Ballou was beaten to death after refusing to give up his leather jacket. The sensational media coverage of the crime and the continued assaults by the Crips increased their notoriety. Several non-Crips gangs formed during this period were no match for the Crips and became concerned with the escalating Crip attacks. The Pirus, Black P. Stones, Athens Park Boys and other gangs not aligned with the Crips often clashed with them. On June 5, 1972, three months after Ballou's murder, Fredrick "Lil Country" Garret was murdered by a Westside Crip. This marked the first Crips murder against another gang member and motivated non-Crip gangs to align with each other. The Brims struck back on August 4, 1972, by murdering Thomas Ellis, an original Westside Crip. By late 1972, the Pirus held a meeting in their neighborhood to discuss growing Crip pressure and intimidation. Several gangs that felt victimized by the Crips joined the Pirus to create a new federation of non-Crips neighborhoods. This alliance became the Bloods. The Pirus are therefore considered the founders of the Bloods.

By 1978, there were 15 Blood sets. Crips still outnumbered Bloods 3 to 1. To assert their power, the Bloods became increasingly violent. During the 1980s, Bloods began distributing crack cocaine in Los Angeles. Blood membership soon rose dramatically as did the number of states in which they were present. These increases were primarily driven by profits from crack cocaine distribution. The huge profits allowed members to relocate to other cities and states.

=== United Blood Nation ===
"Bloods" is a universal term used to refer to West Coast Bloods and United Blood Nation (UBN, also known as the East Coast Bloods). These two groups are traditionally distinct, but both call themselves "Bloods". UBN started in 1993 in Rikers Island's George Motchan Detention Center (GMDC) to form protection from the Latin Kings and Ñetas who were targeting African-American gang members. UBN is a loose confederation of predominantly African-American street gangs. Once released from prison, UBN leaders went back to their New York neighborhoods, where they retained the Bloods name and started recruiting members. UBN has between 7,000 and 15,000 members in the Eastern US. It makes its income through various criminal activities, including distribution of crack cocaine and smuggling drugs into prison.

== Membership ==
Bloods are a loosely structured association of smaller street gangs, known as "sets", that have a common gang culture. Each set has its own leader and generally operates independently from the others. Most Bloods members are African-American males, although some sets have recruited female members as well as members from other races and ethnic backgrounds. Members range in age from early teens to mid-20s, but some hold leadership positions into their late 20s and occasionally 30s.

There is no known national leader of the Bloods but individual Blood sets have a hierarchical leadership structure with identifiable levels of membership. These levels of membership indicate status within a gang. A leader, typically an older member with a more extensive criminal background, runs each set. A set leader is not elected but rather asserts himself by developing and managing the gang's criminal enterprises through his reputation for violence and ruthlessness and his charisma. The majority of set members are called "soldiers", who are typically 16 to 22. Soldiers have a strong sense of commitment to their set and are extremely dangerous because of their willingness to use violence both to obtain the respect of gang members and to respond to any person who "disrespects" the set. "Associates" are not full members, but identify with the gang and take part in various criminal activities. To the extent that women belong to the gang, they are usually associates and tend to be used by their male counterparts to carry weapons, hold drugs, or prostitute themselves to make money for their set.

Recruitment is often influenced by a recruit's environment. Bloods recruit heavily among school-age youth in poor African-American communities. Gang membership offers youth a sense of belonging and protection. It also offers immediate gratification to economically disadvantaged youth who desire the trappings of gang life, such as gold jewelry, cash, and expensive sports clothing. Blood sets have a loose structure of ranks based on how long a person has been involved with a particular set. The ranks do not signify leadership or dominance over the set; they merely signify respect for those who have been in the set longer and have survived the longest. Those with a higher rank do not have a position of authority over those of lower rank.

Bloods members commonly call themselves CKs (Crip Killer), MOBs (Member of Bloods), dawgs, or ballers (meaning drug dealers). The gang has a membership of between approximately 15,000 and 20,000 active in 123 cities and in 33 U.S. states, primarily on the West Coast and, to a lesser extent, the Great Lakes region and the Southeast. Gangs including Bloods have been documented in the U.S. military, in both U.S. and overseas bases. Blood sets also operate in the Canadian cities of Montreal and Toronto.

== Identification ==
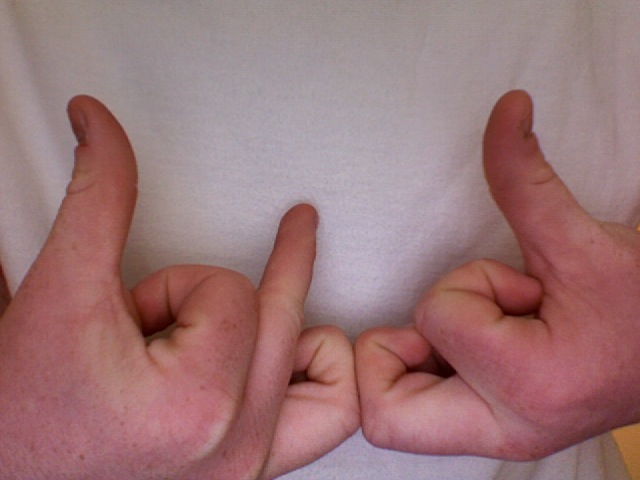
The gang symbol of the Bloods, as the sign reads the word "blood"

Bloods members identify themselves through various indicators, such as colors, clothing, symbols, tattoos, jewelry, graffiti, language, and hand signs. The Bloods' gang color is red. They like to wear sports clothing, including jackets that show their gang color. The most commonly used Bloods symbols include the number "5", the five-pointed star, and the five-pointed crown. These symbols are meant to show the Bloods' affiliation with the People Nation, a large coalition of affiliates created to protect alliance members in federal and state prison. These symbols may be seen in the tattoos, jewelry, and clothing gang members wear as well as the gang graffiti with which Bloods mark their territory. Such graffiti can include gang names, nicknames, declaration of loyalty, threats against rival gangs, or descriptions of criminal acts in which the gang has been involved.

Bloods graffiti can include rival gang symbols (especially those of the Crips) drawn upside down. This is meant as an insult to the rival group and its symbols. Bloods members also have a distinctive slang. Members greet each other using the word "Blood" and often avoid using words with the letter "C", or cross it out. Bloods use hand signs to communicate with one another. Hand signs may be a singular movement, like the American Sign Language letter "B", or a series of movements using one or both hands for more complex phrases. United Blood Nation (UBN) or East Coast Bloods initiates often receive a dog paw mark, represented by three dots, often burned with a cigarette on their right shoulder. Other UBN symbols include a bulldog and a bull.

== Sets ==
The Bloods gang is a network of individual chapters known as "sets". These sets are often loosely connected, having their own leader(s) and operating independently from one another.

- Black P. Stones (Jungles)
- Bounty Hunter Watts Bloods
- Crenshaw Mafia Gangster Bloods
- Dixon Bloods
- Pirus
  - Mob Piru
  - Fruit Town Piru
  - Elm Street Piru
  - Tree Top Piru
  - Cedar Block Piru
- United Blood Nation
  - Nine Trey Gangsters
  - Sex Money Murder

== See also ==
- African-American organized crime
- Crime in Los Angeles
  - Gangs in Los Angeles
- Crips and Bloods: Made in America
- Slippin': Ten Years with the Bloods
- Why We Bang
