= Fruit Town Piru =

Gang in Los Angeles

- Fruit Town Piru members
- Founded: 1970s
- Territory: East side of Compton but active in Houston, Newark and Birmingham
- Ethnicity: Primarily African-American
- Allies: Cedar Block Piru; Campanella Park Piru; Westside Piru; Compton Varrio Locos
- Rivals: Mob Piru; Tree Top Piru; Southside Compton Crips; Santana Blocc Compton Crips; Front Hood Compton Crips; Park Village Compton Crips; Carver Park Compton Crips; Grape Street Watts Crips; Compton Varrio Tortilla Flats

The Fruit Town Piru (also known as the Fruit Town Piru Bloods) are a "set" of the Piru gang alliance, which itself is part of the larger Bloods alliance. This Piru set is known for its rivalry with the Mob Piru Bloods during the early 2000s.

== History ==
=== Formation ===
The Fruit Town Piru formed in the 1970s in Compton, California. The gang was named after the various streets in their neighbourhood which were named after fruits, such as Plum Street, Cherry Street and Peach Street.

=== Feud with Mob Piru ===
Suge Knight, who was affiliated with the Mob Piru, hired members of several Blood sets, including the Fruit Town Piru to work for Death Row Records. George "G" Williams worked as a bodyguard for Knight, until he was fired for failing to return two Death Row Records cars which he borrowed. Several bodyguards from Death Row Records tried to abduct and murder Williams, who escaped, but was shot in the buttocks.

After this, Williams became a close associate of Rodrick Cardale “Lil Rod” Reed, a member of the Fruit Town Piru. The pair are alleged to be behind the murders of several Mob Pirus, including:

- Alton "Buntry" McDonald, who was a production manager at Death Row Records. McDonald was killed on April 3, 2002, at a gas station in Compton.
- Wardell "Poochie" Fouse, who was implicated in the murder of the Notorious B.I.G. Fouse was killed on July 24, 2003, after being shot 10 times in the back as he rode his motorcycle in Compton.

== Rappers affiliated with Fruit Town Piru ==
Chris Brown has been seen using Fruit Town Piru gang signs. Soulja Boy has talked about his affiliation with the gang, stating:

"I’m from Bompton, Fruit Town Piru. I’m a member of the Blood gang. CB is too, supposedly. Once we came out to LA, that’s who we got down with".

Bloody Mary, who was part of the gangsta rap group Bloods & Crips, was affiliated with the Fruit Town Piru.
