= Mob Piru =

American gang

- Todd "Big Rock" Chism (far left; deceased), Suge Knight, Alton "Buntry" McDonald (middle, in fedora; deceased), Roger Sinclair "Neckbone" Williams (far right), and Trevon Lane (bottom). All were members or affiliates of the Mob Piru Bloods.
- Territory: East Compton
- Ethnicity: Primarily African American
- Activities: Drug trafficking Robbery; Arms trafficking
- Allies: Elm Street Piru
- Rivals: South Side Compton Crips; Santana Blocc Compton Crips; Kelly Park Compton Crips; Lueders Park Piru; Cross Atlantic Piru; Compton Varrio Tortilla Flats

The Mob Piru (also known as MOB Piru, East Side Mob Piru, Insane Mob Gang or Mob Piru Bloods) is a street gang and set of the Piru gang alliance, which is itself part of the larger Bloods alliance. The gang was affiliated with the West Coast hip-hop label Death Row Records. The label's co-founder and former CEO, Suge Knight, is affiliated with the Mob Piru Bloods and employed Mob Piru gang members as label security.

== History ==
=== Founding of the Bloods ===
In 1969, a gang called the Piru Street Boys was founded by Sylvester Scott and Vincent Owens. According to some sources, the Piru Street Boys were initially associated with the Crips, but later had a falling out. However, other sources dispute any alliance, claiming that the Piru Street Boys were victimized by the Crips. Nevertheless, by 1972, the Piru Street Boys had formed an alliance with other smaller street gangs such as the Brims, Bishops and Denver Lanes, which also opposed the Crips. This alliance became known as the Bloods, as the members of this alliance called each other "blood".

Over time, more Blood "sets" would form, including the Mob Piru Bloods. According to Reggie Wright Jr., former head of security of Death Row Records, the Mob Piru and Lueders Park Piru were previously one gang, until they split apart.

=== Death Row Records ===
Suge Knight, who would co-found Death Row Records, became affiliated with the Mob Piru set at some point and hired many Mob Piru members in Death Row Records. When Tupac Shakur joined Death Row Records in 1995, he also became affiliated with the Mob Piru. Other notable Mob Pirus who were associated with Death Row Records include:

- Roger Sinclair "Neckbone" Williams, one of Suge Knights Mob Piru Enforcers and close friend of Alton, "Buntry" MacDonald, Aaron "Heron" Palmer and Trevon "Tre" Lane. He also has a daughter with former Death Row artist the Lady of Rage.
- James "MOB James" McDonald, one of Suge Knights enforcers and the brother of Alton "Buntry" McDonald. Operated the Let Me Ride Hydraulic Shop that Suge Knight owned and left after Suge Knight went to jail in 1997. He now does interviews and podcasts about Death Row and his upbringing.
- Jake "Big Jake" Robles, Suge Knight's bodyguard and friend who was shot dead in an Atlanta nightclub on September 23, 1995, by a Bad Boy Records affiliate while attending a Jermaine Dupri birthday event.
- Trevon "Tre" Lane, who was attacked at Lakewood Shopping Mall by a group of Crips, including Orlando Anderson. Several weeks later, on September 7, 1996, Trevon, and several Death Row members including Suge and Tupac beat Anderson at the MGM Grand. Several hours after this beating, Tupac was shot and died six days later.
- Aaron "Heron" Palmer, Suge Knight's bodyguard and friend, who was shot and killed in Compton on June 1, 1997.
- Alton "Buntry" McDonald, who was close friends with Suge Knight. McDonald was shot dead on April 3, 2002.
- Henry "Hendog" Smith, who designed the logo for Death Row Records. Smith was shot dead on October 16, 2002.
- Wardell "Poochie" Fouse, who was implicated in the murder of The Notorious B.I.G. Fouse was shot dead on July 24, 2003.

=== Feud with Lueders Park Piru ===
Although the two gangs were allies, a rivalry developed after a Lueders Park Piru member was murdered in April 2009, leading to a series of shootings between 2009 and 2013. The two gangs attempted to end their rivalry, but were unsuccessful.

== Criminal activities ==
The Mob Piru engage in drug trafficking, arms dealing and robbery. Suge Knight is alleged to have provided the Mob Piru with large quantities of assault rifles.

== Depictions in media ==
- Straight Outta Compton (2015) portrays Suge Knight and other Mob Piru members as personnel of Death Row Records.
- In the film All Eyez on Me (2017), Trevon Lane says "Piru, you already know what time it is", to Suge Knight and Tupac Shakur, after spotting Orlando Anderson in the MGM Grand.
- In Unsolved (2018), several Mob Piru members including Trevon Lane, Wardell Fouse and Alton McDonald are portrayed.
