= Suge Knight =

American record executive (born 1965)

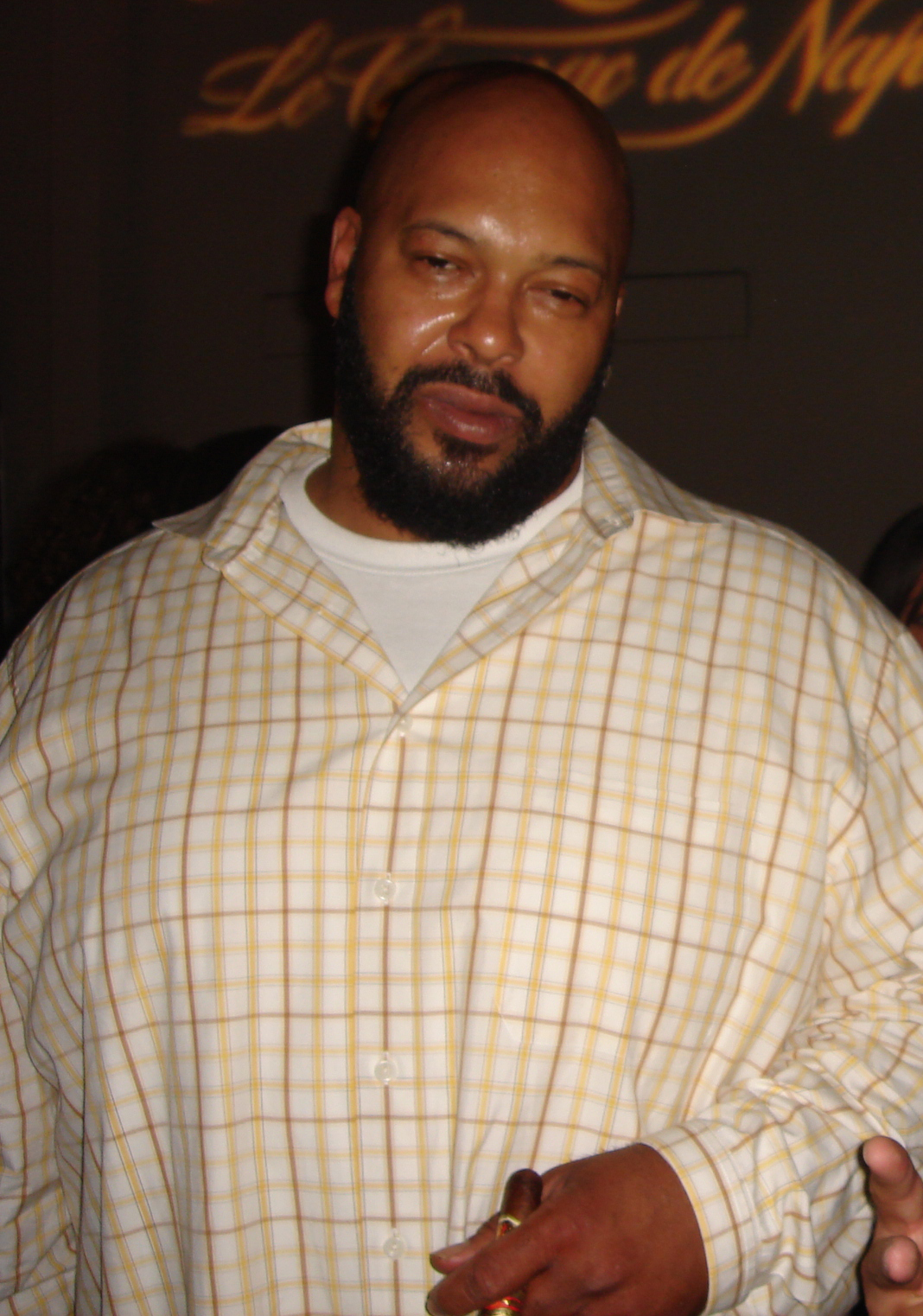
- Knight in 2007
- Born: Marion Hugh Knight Jr. April 19, 1965 (age 61); Compton, California, U.S.
- Other names: Sugar Bear; Simon
- Occupations: Record executive; businessman
- Years active: 1987–1996; 2001–2015
- Children: 6
- Status: Incarcerated
- Allegiance: Mob Piru Bloods
- Conviction: Voluntary manslaughter
- Criminal charges: First-degree murder, attempted first-degree murder, hit and run
- Penalty: 28 years in prison

Details
- Imprisoned at: Richard J. Donovan Correctional Facility (2018)
- Musical career
- Genres: West Coast hip-hop; gangsta rap; G-funk
- Labels: Black Kapital; Death Row
- Football career

No. 79
- Position: Defensive end

Personal information
- Listed height: 6 ft 2 in (1.88 m)
- Listed weight: 265 lb (120 kg)

Career information
- High school: Lynwood (Lynwood, California)
- College: UNLV
- NFL draft: 1987: undrafted

Career history
- Los Angeles Rams (1987)
- Stats at Pro Football Reference

Marion Hugh "Suge" Knight Jr. (/ʃʊɡ/ SHUUG; born April 19, 1965) is an American former record executive who is the co-founder and former CEO of Death Row Records. Knight was a central figure in gangsta rap's commercial success in the 1990s. This feat is attributed to the record label's first two album releases: Dr. Dre's The Chronic in 1992 and Snoop Dogg's Doggystyle in 1993. Knight is currently serving a 28-year sentence in prison for a fatal hit-and-run in 2015.

Before founding Death Row Records, Knight played college football at UNLV as a defensive end. He briefly played in the NFL for the Los Angeles Rams as a replacement player during the 1987 NFL players strike. In 1995, Tupac Shakur began serving a prison sentence of up to 4 1/2 years for a sexual abuse conviction. Knight struck a deal with Shakur that October, posting his $1.4 million bail and freeing him from prison pending an appeal of his conviction, while signing him to Death Row Records. In 1996, the label released Shakur's greatest commercial success, All Eyez on Me. That September, in Las Vegas, an unidentified assailant shot into the car Knight was driving, injuring Knight and fatally wounding Shakur.

Dr. Dre left Death Row Records shortly before Shakur's death, followed by Snoop Dogg two years later. The label rapidly declined. Meanwhile, allegations mounted that Knight, beyond employing gang members, often used intimidation and violence in his business dealings. From the late 1990s to the early 2000s, Knight spent a few years incarcerated for assault convictions and associated violations of probation and parole.

In September 2018, Knight pleaded no contest to voluntary manslaughter in a fatal 2015 hit-and-run. Knight's conviction, along with his previous felonies, triggered California's three-strikes law. He was sentenced to 28 years in prison, and is eligible for parole in October 2034, when he will be 69 years old.

== Early life ==
Knight was born in Compton, California, the son of Maxine Dikemen and Marion Knight Sr. His name Suge (pronounced /ʃʊɡ/) derives from "Sugar Bear", a childhood nickname. He attended Lynwood High School in nearby Lynwood, where he was a football and track star.

Knight is affiliated with the Mob Piru Bloods, a set of the Bloods gang.

== Football career ==
From 1983 to 1985, Knight attended and played football on an athletic scholarship at El Camino College. In 1985, during his junior year he transferred to the University of Nevada, Las Vegas, and played football there as a defensive end for two years, though he did not graduate.

Knight went undrafted in the 1987 NFL draft, but was invited to the Los Angeles Rams training camp with a chance to make the team roster. He was ultimately cut by the Rams during camp, but unexpectedly became a replacement player during the 1987 NFL Players Strike, and played two games for the Rams.

== Career ==
After his brief NFL career, Knight found work as a concert promoter and a bodyguard for celebrities including new jack swing singer Bobby Brown. In 1989, Knight formed his own music publishing company. His first big profit in the business came when Vanilla Ice agreed to sign over royalties from his smash hit "Ice Ice Baby", because the song included material allegedly written by Knight's client Mario Johnson. Knight and his bodyguards confronted Vanilla Ice several times. There was a rumor that Knight entered Vanilla Ice's hotel room and allegedly dangled him by his ankles off the balcony. However, Vanilla Ice has said that never happened, only that Knight threatened to throw him off the balcony; the claim was resolved in court.

Knight next formed an artist management company and signed West Coast hip-hop artists DJ Quik and The D.O.C. Through the latter, he met several members of the seminal gangsta rap group N.W.A.

=== Death Row Records ===
Dr. Dre and The D.O.C. wanted to leave both N.W.A and their label, Ruthless Records, run by Eazy-E, another member of N.W.A. According to N.W.A's manager Jerry Heller, Knight and his henchmen threatened Heller and Eazy-E with lead pipes and baseball bats to make them release Dre, The D.O.C., and Michel'le from their contracts in April 1991. Ultimately, Dre and D.O.C. co-founded Death Row Records in 1991 with Knight, who vowed to make it "the Motown of the '90s".

Initially, Knight fulfilled his ambitions: he secured a distribution deal with Interscope, and Dre's 1992 solo debut album, The Chronic, earned triple platinum status in the United States by the end of 1993. It also made a career for Dre's protégé, Snoop Dogg, whose own debut album Doggystyle obtained a quadruple platinum certification in the United States in 1994.

Meanwhile, Death Row had begun a public feud with 2 Live Crew's Luther Campbell. The following year, he opened a private, by-appointment-only nightclub in Las Vegas called Club 662, so named because the numbers spelled out MOB on telephone keypads, MOB standing for Member of Bloods. In 1995, he ran afoul of civil rights activist C. Delores Tucker's campaign against gangsta rap, whose criticism of Death Row's glamorization of the "gangsta" lifestyle may have helped scuttle a lucrative deal with Time Warner.

=== Tupac Shakur, MC Hammer, Dr. Dre, and the Death Row Label ===
Knight's feud with East Coast record executive Sean Combs progressed when Knight insulted the Bad Boy label founder on air at the Source Awards in August 1995. Openly critical of Combs's tendency of ad-libbing on his artists' songs and dancing in their videos, Knight announced to the audience, "Anyone out there who wanna be a recording artist and wanna stay a star, and don't have to worry about the executive producer trying to be all in the videos, all on the records, dancing, come to Death Row."

Conrad Tillard, then the Nation of Islam minister known as Conrad Muhammad, the Hip Hop Minister, counseled Combs during his ensuing feud with Knight, and also asked Knight to stop terrorizing Combs. Tillard also protected Combs, sending elite guards from his Mosque No. 7 to guard Combs, who was receiving death threats from gangsters connected to Knight.

The same year, Knight offered to post bail (US$1.4 million) for Tupac Shakur if the rapper agreed to sign with Death Row. Shakur agreed, setting the stage for his 1996 double album All Eyez on Me and The Don Killuminati: The 7 Day Theory.

M.C. Hammer's relationship with Suge Knight dates back to 1988. With the success of Hammer's 1994 album The Funky Headhunter (featuring Tha Dogg Pound), Hammer signed with Death Row Records by 1995, along with Snoop Dogg and his close friend, Tupac. The label did not release the album of Hammer's music (entitled Too Tight) while he had a career with them, although he did release versions of some tracks on his next album. However, Hammer did record tracks with Shakur and others, most notably the song "Too Late Playa" (along with Big Daddy Kane and Danny Boy). After the death of Shakur in 1996, Hammer left the record company. He later explained his concern about this circumstance in an interview on Trinity Broadcasting Network (TBN) since he was in Las Vegas with Tupac the night of his death. Hammer released 2Pac's "Unconditional Love", on his Family Affair album, in 1998. The friendships between Hammer (played by Romany Malco), Tupac (played by Lamont Bentley) and Suge (played by Anthony Norris) were depicted in the television film, Too Legit: The MC Hammer Story (airing on VH1 in 2001).

Dr. Dre, frustrated with the company's increasingly thuggish reputation and Knight's violent inclinations, left and formed his own label, Aftermath Entertainment, in March 1996.

=== Murders of Tupac Shakur and The Notorious B.I.G.: theories accusing Knight ===
Though never charged by any prosecutor for any involvement, Suge Knight has been the subject of theories in popular culture about the murder of two well-known rap artists. Tupac Shakur was shot four times in a drive-by shooting in Las Vegas, Nevada, on September 7, 1996, and died six days later on September 13. When Shakur's East Coast rival, The Notorious B.I.G. was murdered in a similar drive-by shooting in Los Angeles, California, on March 9, 1997, speculation arose that Knight was involved and that Biggie's death was a revenge killing. Former Death Row artists, including Snoop Dogg, also later accused Knight of being involved in Tupac's murder.

Ex-detective Russell Poole conjectured that Knight had Tupac killed before he could part ways with Knight's label and then conspired to kill Biggie to divert attention from himself in the Tupac case. The Biggie murder theory implicated Knight, a rogue cop, and a mortgage broker named Amir Muhammad (who was never a police suspect) along with the chief of police and the LAPD in a conspiracy to murder and cover up the murder of Biggie. The Biggie theory formed the basis of a US$500 million lawsuit by his family, the Wallaces, against the city of Los Angeles. A key source for Poole's theory was Kevin Hackie. Hackie had implicated Knight and David Mack. Hackie, a former Death Row associate, said that he had knowledge of involvement between Knight and Mack and other LAPD officers. His information was used by the Wallace family in their suit against the city of L.A. for Biggie's death. But Hackie later told Los Angeles Times reporter Chuck Philips that the Wallace attorneys had altered his declarations. The suit brought by the Wallace family against the city of L.A. based on the Russell Poole theory was dismissed in 2010.

In 2005, Chuck Philips of the Los Angeles Times reported that another source for the theory of Biggie's murder implicating Muhammad, Mack, Knight and the LAPD was a schizophrenic man known as "Psycho Mike" who later confessed to hearsay and memory lapses and falsely identifying Muhammad. John Cook of Brill's Content noted that Philips's article "demolished" the Poole-Sullivan theory of Biggie's murder.

Around the same time, Philips wrote an Los Angeles Times two-part series titled "Who Killed Tupac Shakur?" about the murder of Shakur and events surrounding it based on police affidavits, court documents and interviews.

The Los Angeles Times story indicated that "the shooting was carried out by a Compton gang called the Southside Crips to avenge the beating of one of its members by Shakur a few hours earlier. Orlando Anderson, the Crip whom Shakur had attacked, fired the fatal shots. Las Vegas police discounted Anderson as a suspect after questioning him once briefly. He was later killed in what police said was an unrelated gang shooting." The article implicated East Coast music figures, including Biggie, Shakur's nemesis at the time, alleging that he paid for the gun. Before their own deaths, Biggie, his family and Anderson denied any role in Shakur's murder. Biggie's family produced documents purporting to show that the rapper was in New York and New Jersey at the time. The New York Times called the documents inconclusive, stating:

The pages purport to be three computer printouts from Daddy's House, indicating that Wallace was in the studio recording a song called Nasty Boy on the afternoon Shakur was shot. They indicate that Wallace wrote half the session, was In and out/sat around and laid down a ref, shorthand for a reference vocal, the equivalent of a first take. But nothing indicates when the documents were created. And Louis Alfred, the recording engineer listed on the sheets, said in an interview that he remembered recording the song with Wallace in a late-night session, not during the day. He could not recall the date of the session but said it was likely not the night Shakur was shot. We would have heard about it, Mr. Alfred said.

Mark Duvoisin, an editor at the Los Angeles Times, wrote in an opinion piece in Rolling Stone that Philips's account had withstood attacks to its credibility.

However, the Los Angeles Times printed a full retraction of the two-part series and released Philips shortly thereafter during a wave of layoffs.

In Tupac Shakur: Before I Wake, a documentary by Tupac Shakur's bodyguard, he and Cathy Scott, author of The Killing of Tupac Shakur and The Murder of Biggie Smalls, said that Knight would not have placed himself in the path of bullets he knew were coming. On her website Scott responded to a reader of her book stating that she felt there was never evidence to link Knight to Tupac's murder. Scott also told CNN, "That theory doesn't even add up. 'Open fire on my car, but try not to hit me?'"

A 2006 law-enforcement task force probe into Biggie's murder, which included then-LAPD Detective Greg Kading, included the murder of Shakur. In his 2011 self-published book, Murder Rap, Kading wrote that Duane "Keffe D" Davis, a member of the "Crips" street gang, gave a confession years later saying he rode in the car used in the Las Vegas shooting of Shakur. The Crips said they had been offered a million dollars by associates of Bad Boy Records to kill Shakur. Kading, who named Sean Combs as having been involved in the conspiracy, also wrote that a bounty was offered for Suge Knight's murder.

While in Las Vegas, Kading's book stated, Davis and fellow Crips members crossed paths with a BMW carrying Knight and Shakur. The fatal shots were fired by Orlando "Baby Lane" Anderson, who sat on the side of the car closest to the BMW.

Kading alleged that Knight hired Wardell "Poochie" Fouse to kill Biggie, Sean Combs' most valuable star, whose murder was done following a party at the Peterson Automotive Museum. Poochie later survived a murder attempt in 2000, but was killed in 2003. Charges were never brought against Fouse or Knight and the task force disbanded for reasons of "internal affairs".

After Shakur's death and the release of Tha Doggfather, Snoop Dogg openly criticized Knight for the murder of Shakur and left the label in 1998. He signed with Master P's No Limit Records and then formed his own record label, Doggystyle Records. In 2002, Snoop released the song "Pimp Slapp'd", in which he repudiated Knight and Death Row. In 2006, Snoop again attacked Knight verbally. Knight responded, stating that Snoop was a "police informer" who "never goes to jail".

=== Gang violence associated with Death Row Records ===
Knight, who was affiliated with the Mob Piru Bloods, hired members from this gang to work for Death Row Records. Knight also hired members of two other Blood sets, Fruit Town Piru and Lueders Park Piru. By the early 2000s, a rivalry developed between the Mob Piru and the Fruit Town Piru, which resulted in the deaths of several people from Knight's inner circle.

=== End of Death Row Records ===
On April 4, 2006, Knight filed bankruptcy due to civil litigation against him in which Lydia Harris was said to have been cheated out of a 50% stake in Death Row Records. Under questioning by creditors, he denied having money tucked away in foreign countries or in an African company that deals in diamonds and gold. Bankruptcy documents filed showed Knight had no income from employment or operation of a business. According to financial records, his bank account contained just $11, and he owned clothing worth $1,000, furniture and appliances valued at $2,000, and jewelry worth $25,000. He also testified that the last time he had checked the label's financial records was at least 10 years prior. Knight's lawyer said that his client was still "at the helm" of Death Row and had been working on securing distribution deals for the label's catalog. Harris told reporters she had received a $1 million payment but had not agreed to settle the matter. "I'm telling you, I didn't do a settlement for $1 million. That's ridiculous. Let's keep it real," she said.

On July 7, 2006, federal judge Ellen Carroll ordered a bankruptcy trustee takeover of Suge Knight's Death Row Records, saying the record label had undergone a gross amount of mismanagement.

Knight filed for Chapter 11 bankruptcy protection, which allows a company to continue business operations while restructuring. Death Row was being operated by Neilson during the bankruptcy proceedings, while Knight oversaw his bankruptcy estate as a debtor in possession.

In June 2007, Knight placed his 7 bedroom, 9 1/2 bathroom home in Malibu, California, on the market for $6.2 million as part of his "financial makeover". The mansion was finally sold in December 2008 in bankruptcy court for $4.56 million.

In June 2008, Death Row Records was put up for auction in Bankruptcy Court. The winning bid went to New York-based company Global Music Group. Global Music Group failed to secure funding and the Death Row Records catalog eventually went to Wideawake Entertainment.

In early 2008, Knight formed a new record company called Black Kapital Records as a vehicle of releases after his former label Death Row Records filed for bankruptcy, rumored to be due to having few artists and Knight's prison time. Knight alongside Manager Nino Cappuccino, Young Life and label A&R executive Lesane Casino debuted a reality show called Unfinished Business. The show was based on Knight dispelling long-standing rumors in sit down interviews, his days with Death Row and the artists he worked with, and finding new talent for his record label.

On January 25, 2009, an auction was held for everything found in the Death Row Records office after the company filed for bankruptcy, including some of Knight's personal items. Of note was the Death Row Records electric chair which sold for $2,500. Some of Knight's personal items appeared in an auction during the debut episode of A&E's Storage Wars, and a vault full of items (including a coat) was purchased by featured buyer Barry Weiss.

== Personal life ==
On November 3, 1989, Knight married Sharitha Lee Golden in Las Vegas.

In October 2023, Suge Knight co-founded a podcast with Breakbeat Media.

== Personal and legal troubles ==
=== 1995 convictions ===
In a 1995 case, Knight pleaded no contest and was sentenced to five years' probation for assaulting two rappers in the summer of 1992 at a Hollywood recording studio.

=== 1996 probation violation leading to incarceration ===
On October 22, 1996, Knight was sent to jail pending a hearing on the probation violation that happened on September 7, 1996, when Suge Knight and his Death Row entourage including Tupac Shakur attacked Orlando Anderson, a Crips gang member. Knight was then sentenced to nine years in prison on February 28, 1997, for the probation violation but was granted early release and was let out of FCI Sheridan on August 6, 2001.

=== 2003 conviction and incarceration ===
In 2003, Knight was sent to prison again, this time for ten months, for violating parole when he struck a parking lot attendant, and reoccurring gang affiliation in 2002. Death Row's income rapidly declined during Knight's recurrent incarceration.

=== 2006 dispute with Snoop ===
In 2006, Knight was engaged in another dispute with former friend and ex-associate Snoop Dogg after Snoop insulted him in an interview with Rolling Stone magazine.

=== 2008 altercation and gang accusations ===
In January 2008, it was stated by police that Knight was one of the members of the Mob Piru street gang in a crackdown by authorities in the city of Compton. On May 10, 2008, Knight was involved in an altercation involving a monetary dispute outside of a nightclub ("Shag") in Hollywood. He was unconscious for three minutes. At the hospital, he did not cooperate with the Los Angeles Police Department (LAPD).

=== 2008 bankruptcy ===
As part of an October 30, 2008, bankruptcy claim, Knight also filed a lawsuit against Kanye West and his associates. The lawsuit concerns an August 2005 shooting at West's pre-Video Music Awards party, where Knight was wounded by a gunshot to the upper leg.

=== 2009 altercation ===
In February 2009, Knight was taken to Scottsdale Healthcare Osborn to be treated for facial injuries he received during an altercation at a private party in the W Scottsdale Hotel, where Knight was punched.

=== 2012 arrest ===
On February 8, 2012, Knight was arrested in Las Vegas, after police found cannabis in his car and several warrants for prior traffic violations.

=== 2014 shooting ===
On August 24, 2014, Knight was shot at a pre-Video Music Awards party hosted by Chris Brown at a West Hollywood Sunset Strip nightclub ("1OAK"). Although shot six times, he was able to walk from the venue to an ambulance. His injuries required surgery. Evidence from closed circuit television (CCTV) footage showed that Knight was the intended target of the shooting. Knight was released from the hospital on August 27. Friend Keith Middlebrook told the New York Daily News that Knight returned home with the intention to "heal up in a few days and be stronger than ever".

Knight refused to cooperate with law enforcement on the matter. Party attendee Jeezy later said on The Breakfast Club that he would have been shot had he not been pushed out of the way just prior to the shooting.

=== Prosecution on charges of robbery (2014–2016) ===
On October 29, 2014, Knight and comedian Katt Williams were both arrested and charged with second-degree robbery in connection with an alleged theft of a camera from a paparazzi photographer the previous month in Beverly Hills, California. While in jail, doctors found a blood clot in Knight's lung. Both Knight and Williams pleaded not guilty to robbery. In 2016, the robbery trial was delayed until the resolution of the unrelated murder trial.

=== Prosecution on charges of voluntary manslaughter (2015–2017) ===
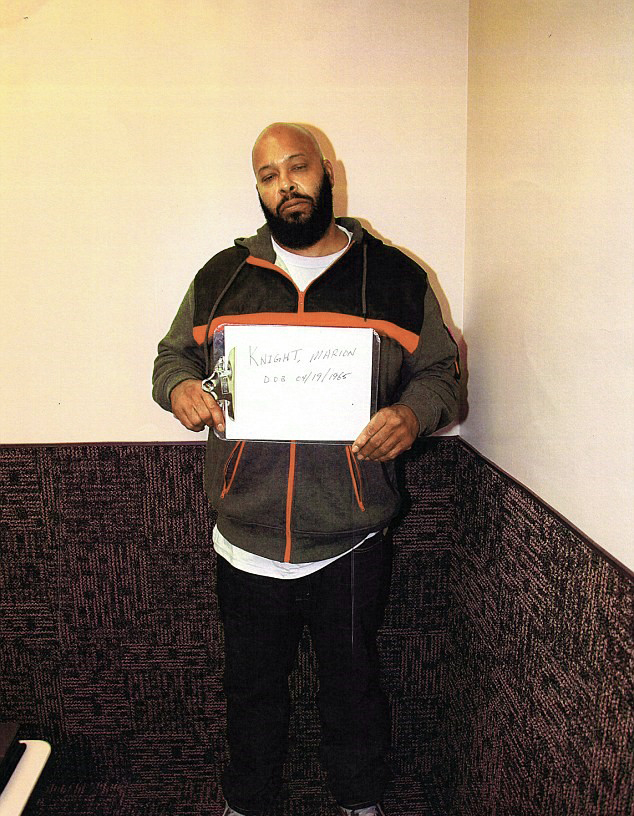
Knight after his 2015 arrest

On January 29, 2015, Knight crashed his car into two men, killing Terry Carter (his friend and co-founder of Heavyweight Records), and fled the scene in Compton, California. The second victim, filmmaker Cle Sloan, suffered multiple fractures in his ankles and head injuries. Witnesses said Knight followed the men to a parking lot burger stand after an argument on the Straight Outta Compton film set, and that the collision looked intentional. Security footage video showed Knight running over both men. Knight said he acted in self-defense.

In March 2015, Knight was hospitalized after he told a judge that he was suffering from blindness and other complications. Knight fired attorneys handling his murder case and said he was receiving inadequate medical treatment while in custody. The same month, a court set bail for his release for US$25 million. Knight collapsed in court shortly after the bail was announced. On April 16, 2015, Knight's bail was reduced to US$10 million. In July 2015, Knight's lawyer said that Knight might have a brain tumor on the same day that Knight's request for lower bail was refused. In January 2016, Knight changed counsel in his murder trial for a fourth time. In May 2016, three attorneys replaced the two hired earlier in the year. In July 2016, the judge denied Knight's motion to reveal the identities of several key prosecution witnesses, citing Knight's long history of violence. Knight became emotional after the ruling, stating that because of his health problems, he will die in jail. In March 2017, Knight was hospitalized after suffering from blood clots, a condition that had been affecting him for two and a half years by that time. Knight's hospitalization delayed the trial to September 2018.

When September arrived, Knight pleaded no contest to voluntary manslaughter. The judge sentenced Knight to 28 years in prison: 22 years for running over the victim and 6 years because it was Knight's third strike under California's three-strikes law. As of March 2023, Knight is incarcerated at RJ Donovan Correctional Facility in San Diego, and will not be eligible for parole until October 2034.

=== Prosecution on charges of threatening death (2017) ===
In February 2017, a grand jury indicted Knight on charges of "threatening death or bodily injury" for sending threatening text messages to F. Gary Gray, the director of Straight Outta Compton, c. August 8, 2014. Knight pleaded not guilty to the charge, and the charge was dropped as part of Knight's plea agreement in the death of Terry Carter.

== Biographical portrayals in film ==
Year	Title	Portrayed by	Notes
2001	Too Legit: The MC Hammer Story	Anthony Norris	Biographical film about MC Hammer
2009	Notorious	Sean Ringgold	Biographical film about The Notorious B.I.G.
2015	Straight Outta Compton	R. Marcos Taylor	Biographical film about N.W.A
2016	Surviving Compton: Dre, Suge & Michel'le	R. Marcos Taylor	Biographical film about Michel'le
2017	All Eyez on Me	Dominic L. Santana	Biographical film about Tupac Shakur
2018	Unsolved	Dominic L. Santana	American true crime anthology television series based on the murders of rappers Tupac and Notorious B.I.G.

== Documentary films ==
- In 1997 Knight was interviewed in prison for the 2002 documentary Biggie & Tupac by Nick Broomfield. In 2021 he was interviewed again in prison by Broomfield for the follow up documentary "Last Man Standing: Suge Knight and the Murders of Biggie and Tupac".
- Knight was interviewed for Rap Sheet: Hip-Hop and the Cops (2006), a documentary that delved into the NYPD's surveillance of hip-hop artists and executives.
- American Dream/American Knightmare, a documentary by Antoine Fuqua featuring interviews conducted with Knight in 2011 and 2012, was broadcast on Showtime on December 21, 2018.
