= Murder of Tupac Shakur =

1996 killing in Paradise, Nevada, U.S.

- Tupac Shakur with Suge Knight minutes before Shakur was shot (Note: The photo's inconsistent datestamp is because the camera was still set to the Eastern Time Zone since its purchase in Pittsburgh.)
- Location: 36°6′52″N 115°9′52″W; Paradise, Nevada, U.S.
- Date: September 7, 1996; 30 years ago 11:15 p.m. (PDT; UTC−07:00)
- Target: Tupac Shakur and Suge Knight
- Attack type: Drive-by shooting
- Weapon: .40 caliber Glock 22 semi-automatic pistol
- Deaths: Tupac Shakur (died on September 13, 1996)
- Injuries: Suge Knight
- Perpetrator: Duane Davis (orchestrator)
- Motive: Retaliation for Shakur assaulting Orlando Anderson, Davis' nephew
- Accused: Orlando "Baby Lane" Anderson; DeAndrae "Dre" Smith; Terrence “Bubble Up” Brown
- Verdict: Davis: Guilty
- Convictions: Davis: First-degree murder
- Sentence: Davis: 40 years to life in prison
- Convicted: Duane "Keefe D" Davis (Note: In a September 2026 interview with The Hollywood Reporter following his conviction, Davis said that his name was misspelled as "Keffe D" in his memoir and that the correct spelling is "Keefe D.")

On September 7, 1996, at 11:15 p.m. (PDT), Tupac Shakur, a 25-year-old American rapper, was shot in a drive-by shooting in Paradise, Nevada. The shooting occurred when the car carrying Shakur was stopped at a red light at East Flamingo Road and Koval Lane. Shakur was struck by four rounds fired from a .40-caliber Glock 22 pistol — two in the chest, one in the arm and one in the thigh. The driver, Death Row Records executive Suge Knight, was struck in the head by bullet fragments. Shakur died from his injuries six days later.

Orlando 'Baby Lane' Anderson, a member of the South Side Compton Crips gang, was suspected in the murder but denied being involved and was never charged; he was killed in an unrelated gang shooting in 1998. On September 29, 2023, Duane "Keffe D" Davis, (Note: Although the nickname is also frequently rendered "Keefe D", the spelling "Keffe D" is used in Davis's own memoir and by major contemporary news outlets; the Associated Press has specifically corrected "Keefe" to "Keffe" in its photo captions.) Anderson's uncle, was arrested after being indicted by a grand jury for first-degree murder of Shakur. On August 31, 2026, Davis was found guilty of murdering Shakur, and on October 13, was sentenced to 40 years to life in prison.

== Background ==
=== Shakur ===
Tupac Shakur was an American rapper born on June 16, 1971. His debut album, 2Pacalypse Now (1991), made him a prominent figure in West Coast hip-hop. His music featured a mix of gangsta rap and political themes, addressing topics such as racism, police brutality, gang violence and the war on drugs.

Shakur faced repeated criminal charges. In 1993, he was charged with two counts of aggravated assault for shooting two off-duty police officers, though the charges were later dropped. He was convicted of sexual assault in 1994 and served eight months in prison, but was released pending appeal in 1995. Following his release, he signed to Death Row Records, the label founded by Suge Knight.

=== East Coast–West Coast feud ===
The murder occurred at the height of the East Coast–West Coast hip-hop rivalry, a focal point of which was the feud between Shakur and the East Coast rapper Biggie "the Notorious B.I.G." Smalls. The two rappers were initially friends but had a falling out after Shakur was shot in a building where Smalls was recording in November 1994. Shakur accused Biggie and Sean Combs, the head of Smalls's label Bad Boy Records, of setting up or having prior knowledge of the shooting. In 1995, Shakur interpreted the release of the Smalls song "Who Shot Ya?" as a diss track targeting him, and later that year, Knight made a speech at the 1995 Source Awards in which Knight insulted Combs and Bad Boy.

In June 1996, Shakur released the diss track "Hit 'Em Up", which journalist Chuck Philips described as "a caustic anti-East Coast jihad in which the rapper threatens to eliminate Biggie, [Combs], and a slew of Bad Boy artists and other New York City acts". "Hit 'Em Up" is regarded as the feud's centerpiece and a turning point in which things were said and rapped that could never be taken back.

The publication of VIBE magazine's 1996 Juice issue, featuring Biggie and Combs on the cover along with the caption "East vs. West", was seen as an escalation of the rivalry.

== Prior events ==
Orlando Anderson, a member of the South Side Compton Crips, had been in a feud with various employees of Death Row Records. In July 1996, Anderson and his crew mugged Death Row employee Trevon "Tre" Lane, a member of the rival Mob Piru Bloods, at a Foot Locker store at the Lakewood Mall in Lakewood, California and stole his company medallion, which is what caused Suge Knight's security team to target him later in Las Vegas. Anderson had been under intermittent surveillance by the Compton Police Department's gang unit due to his suspected involvement in localized gang warfare and multiple unsolved homicides in Compton. Gang investigators later noted that Anderson was being actively monitored during the summer of 1996 as a person of interest in regional gang shootouts.

On the evening of September 7, 1996, Shakur and Knight attended the Bruce Seldon vs. Mike Tyson boxing match at the MGM Grand in Las Vegas, Nevada. After leaving the match, Lane spotted Anderson in the MGM Grand lobby. Lane informed Shakur, who in turn attacked Anderson in the lobby. Shakur asked Anderson if he was from the "South" (South Side Crips) and punched him in the face, knocking him to the ground. Shakur and Knight's entourage assisted in assaulting Anderson. The fight, which was captured on the MGM Grand's video surveillance, was broken up by hotel security.

After the fight, Shakur returned to his hotel, the Luxor Las Vegas. He disclosed to his girlfriend, Kidada Jones, his involvement in the fight, having previously promised to return to her after entering the MGM Grand and having her stay in a vehicle. After changing clothes, Shakur left with Knight in a black 1996 BMW 750iL sedan and went to Club 662, which was owned by Knight, to perform at a charity concert. Minutes before the shooting, an acquaintance of Shakur, Leonard Jefferson, captured one of the last images of Shakur sitting in the vehicle with Knight.

== Shooting ==
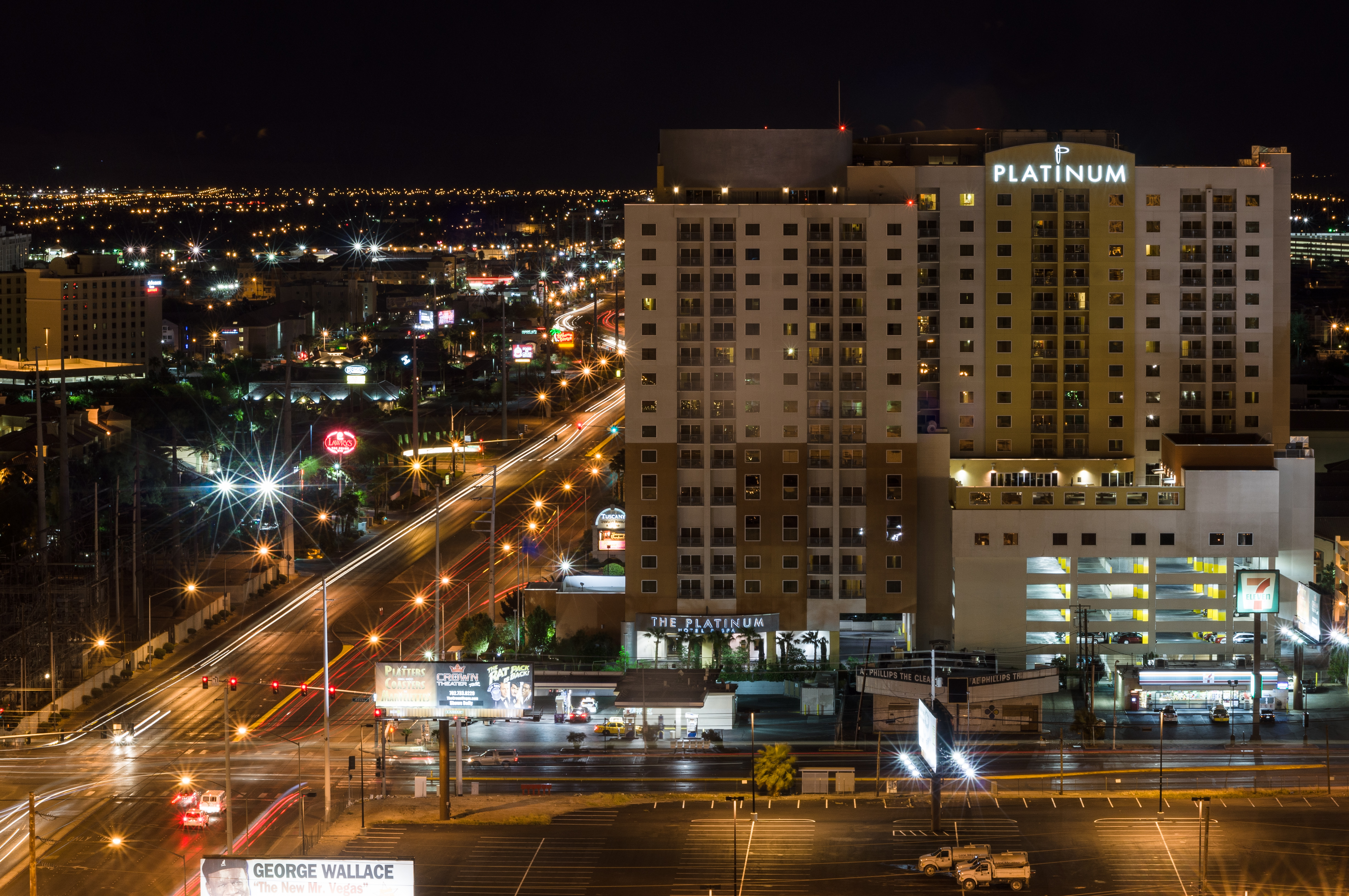
East Flamingo Road and Koval Lane intersection, 2012

At 11:00–11:05 p.m. (PDT), Shakur and Knight were halted on Las Vegas Boulevard by officers from the Las Vegas Metropolitan Police Department (LVMPD) bicycle patrol for playing their car stereo too loudly and not having license plates. The plates were found in the trunk of Knight's car, and the party was released a few minutes later without being cited. At 11:10 p.m., while they were stopped at a red light at the intersection of East Flamingo Road and Koval Lane in front of the Maxim Hotel, a vehicle occupied by two women pulled up on their left side. Shakur, talking through the window of the BMW, exchanged words with the two women and invited them to go to Club 662.

At 11:15 p.m., a white, four-door, late-model Cadillac pulled up to Knight's right side. The shooter, seated at the back of the Cadillac, rolled down the window and rapidly fired gunshots at the BMW from a .40 S&W Glock 22 pistol. Shakur was hit four times: twice in the chest, once in the arm and once in the thigh. One of the bullets went into Shakur's right lung. Knight was hit in the head by fragmentation.

Shakur's bodyguard, Frank Alexander, stated that when he was about to ride along with Shakur in Knight's car, Shakur asked him to drive Jones's car instead, in case they needed additional vehicles from Club 662 back to the Luxor. Alexander reported in his documentary, Tupac Shakur: Before I Wake..., that shortly after the shooting, one of the convoy's cars followed the assailant, but he never heard from the occupants. Yaki Kadafi and a team of bodyguards were riding in the car behind the BMW at the time of the shooting and, along with members of the Death Row entourage, refused to cooperate with police.

With a flat tire, Knight drove Shakur and himself a mile from the shooting site to the corner of Las Vegas Boulevard and Harmon Avenue. They were again pulled over by the LVMPD bike patrol, who alerted paramedics through radio. After arriving on the scene, police and paramedics took Knight and Shakur to the University Medical Center of Southern Nevada. They were pulled over just a short distance from the MGM Grand, where their evening had begun.

Gobi Rahimi, a Death Row music video director who visited Shakur at the hospital, later reported that he received news from a Death Row marketing employee that the shooters had called the label and threatened Shakur. Gobi informed the LVMPD, but said they claimed to be understaffed. No attackers ever came to the hospital.

== Aftermath ==
At the hospital, Shakur was placed on life support and ultimately put under a medically-induced coma after repeatedly trying to get out of bed. He was visited by Jones and regained consciousness when she played Don McLean's "Vincent" on the CD player next to his bed. According to Jones, Shakur moaned, and his eyes were "filled with mucus and swollen". She told Shakur that she loved him.

Knight was released from the hospital the day following the shooting but did not speak until September 11. He told police he "heard something, but saw nothing" the night of the shooting. A spokesman for the LVMPD said Knight's statement did nothing to help the investigation. Police at the time of Shakur's hospitalization reported having no leads, with Sgt. Kevin Manning later stating that the LVMPD did not receive "a whole lot of cooperation" from Shakur's entourage.

Rahimi and members of Shakur's group, Outlawz, guarded Shakur's hospital room out of fear that whoever had shot Shakur was "gonna come finish him off". Rahimi mentioned the possibility that Outlawz brought weapons with them. On the afternoon of September 13, while in the critical care unit, Shakur died of respiratory failure that led to cardiac arrest after the removal of his right lung; he was pronounced dead at 4:03 p.m. Doctors attempted to revive him but could not stop the hemorrhaging. His mother, Afeni Shakur, made the decision to cease medical treatment.

In 2014, LVMPD officer Chris Carroll, one of the first police personnel to arrive at the scene and who witnessed Shakur's last moments, said the rapper refused to state who shot him. When Carroll asked Shakur if he saw the person or people who shot him, Shakur looked at him, took a breath and said "fuck you" as his last words.

== Crips–Bloods conflict ==
On September 9, two days after the shooting, a violent gang war erupted in Compton between the South Side Crips and Mob Piru Bloods, resulting in twelve shootings and three fatalities. Former Compton detective Robert Ladd later described the conflict as "ten days of hell". Anderson's close friend, B.G. Knocc Out, stated that Anderson was shot in the legs with an AK-47 because of the conflict and used a wheelchair for some time.

== Investigation ==
=== Arrest of Orlando Anderson ===
On October 2, 300 Compton police officers searched the residences of known gang members and arrested Anderson. He was released immediately following his arrest after authorities declined to file charges for the murder of Shakur. Anderson further denied involvement in the murder, telling the Los Angeles Times in 1997 that he was a fan of Shakur.

On September 8, 1997, Anderson filed a lawsuit against Shakur's estate for the fight that occurred preceding the murder. Shakur's mother Afeni Shakur filed a wrongful death countersuit against Anderson. That legal battle was reportedly settled shortly before Anderson's death. On May 29, 1998, Anderson was involved in a shootout at a car wash in Compton, California, following a dispute with rival gang members. Anderson was struck in the chest and was pronounced dead. Detective Tim Brennan later stated that the shootout was the result of a dispute over drug money and was unrelated to the Shakur investigation.

While this was unfolding, Manning told Las Vegas Sun investigative reporter Cathy Scott that Shakur's murder "may never be solved" due to lack of cooperation from witnesses. E.D.I. Mean, a collaborator of Shakur and a member of Outlawz, later stated he was positive law enforcement knew "what happened" and added, "This is America. We found bin Laden."

=== Witnesses ===
At the time of the shooting, an entourage of around ten automobiles was following the BMW carrying Shakur and Knight. Knight stated during an ABC interview that he did not know who had killed Shakur but would never tell police if he did. Kadafi was involved in a scuffle with police two days following the shooting, after he protested their traffic stop of a motorist with whom he was acquainted. Kadafi left Las Vegas after Shakur's death, traveling to Atlanta and Los Angeles before settling in New Jersey, where his relatives lived.

In that time, Compton investigators assembled mug shots of several gang members, which included Anderson, and hand-delivered them to Las Vegas. Manning said detectives called Kadafi's lawyer to set up a meeting with the rapper so that he could be shown the pictures. According to Manning, the calls were not returned. Officers did not try to locate Kadafi, who was himself later killed in a shooting in Orange, New Jersey, in November 1996.

In early 1997, Mean and Alexander told the Times that they had never been asked by the LVMPD to view a photo lineup in the case, despite having witnessed the shooting and having seen the men in the car from which the shots were fired. In an interview with Alexander conducted by the LVMPD on March 19, 1997, he was shown a series of eight photo lineups but was unable to identify any suspects from them. Mean claimed to have seen all four men in the vehicle. Alexander reported seeing the face of the suspect who shot Shakur. In a March 1997 police interview, Alexander said that he only saw the occupants of the shooter's car in "more of a profile". The LVMPD disputed the pair's account of what they had reported to police the night of the shooting.

=== Allegations ===
Due to the East Coast–West Coast rivalry, speculation spread that B.I.G. and other East Coast hip-hop figures, such as Mobb Deep, Capone and Noreaga, were involved in Shakur's murder. In 2002, Philips and former LAPD detective Greg Kading reported that the South Side Crips were offered a $1 million bounty to kill Shakur and Knight; Kading reported that the bounty was offered by Combs, while Philips reported it was offered by B.I.G. B.I.G.'s family denied the report, providing documents that claimed he was in New Jersey at the time, though The New York Times called the documents inconclusive. B.I.G. expressed sadness over Shakur's murder but declined to attend his funeral, saying that Shakur "made [B.I.G.'s] life miserable".

In October 2024, Shakur's family hired a private investigator to determine if the murder could be linked to Combs.

=== Reporting ===
In 2002, the Los Angeles Times published a two-part story by Philips, "Who Killed Tupac Shakur?", based on a year-long investigation. Philips reported that "the shooting was carried out by a Compton gang called the South Side Crips to avenge the beating of one of its members by Shakur a few hours earlier. Orlando Anderson, the Crip whom Shakur had attacked, fired the fatal shots. Las Vegas police considered Anderson a suspect and interviewed him only once, briefly. Anderson was killed nearly two years later in an unrelated gang shooting." Philips's article also implicated East Coast rappers, including B.I.G., and several New York City criminals.

The second article in Philips's series asserted that the LVMPD had mishandled the original investigation. Philips listed what he described as investigative failures: (1) discounting the fight at the MGM Grand, in which Shakur was involved in beating Anderson; (2) failing to follow up with a member of Shakur's entourage who witnessed the shooting, who told the LVMPD he could probably identify one or more of the assailants but was killed before being interviewed; and (3) failing to follow up on a lead from a witness who spotted a white Cadillac similar to the car from which the fatal shots were fired and in which the shooters escaped.

Haaretz, an Israeli newspaper, reported in 2011 that the Federal Bureau of Investigation (FBI) released documents as a result of a Freedom of Information Act request, revealing its investigation of the Jewish Defense League for extorting protection money from Shakur and other rappers after making death threats against them.

In 2017, Knight claimed he might have been the target of the attack that killed Shakur, arguing that it was a hit on him as a staged coup to seize control of Death Row Records.

== Perpetrator ==
In 2009, Duane "Keefe D" Davis was under investigation in a drug-related case which compelled him to submit to questioning. During the questioning, investigators also asked Davis about the March 1997 murder of the Notorious B.I.G.; Davis denied involvement in that killing but told them, "we did the other one", referring to Shakur's murder. Davis, who was 33 years old when Tupac Shakur was killed, and is Anderson's uncle and a Crips gang leader in California, told Los Angeles law enforcement officers what he knew about Shakur's murder under a proffer agreement that prevented his statements from being used against him in court.

In the BET television documentary series Death Row Chronicles, broadcast in 2018, Davis claimed to have been in the Cadillac, specifically in the front passenger seat, with Shakur's murderer when the shots were fired. He declined to name the shooter, citing "street code." Despite this, he stated that the Cadillac was driven by Terrence "T-Brown" Brown, and that Anderson and DeAndrae "Dre" Smith were sitting in the backseat, all of whom were South Side Crips and are now deceased. Davis also stated that the shooter was sitting in the backseat.

On June 17, 2019, Davis released and promoted his memoir Compton Street Legend, co-written by Yusuf Jah, directly implicating himself as having engineered the murder, including describing his presence in the Cadillac during the attack. The book also claims that Sean Combs ordered the hit. Davis has maintained his innocence, saying the account of the shooting in the book is fictionalized and attributing its contents to others.

On July 18, 2023, the LVMPD executed a search warrant in connection with Shakur's murder. The search was conducted in a home in Henderson, Nevada, and it was stated that the search was connected to the investigation into Shakur's death. It was later revealed that the home belonged to Davis's wife. Davis was subsequently arrested in connection with Shakur's murder on the morning of September 29, 2023. He was held without bail and charged with murder. He pleaded not guilty on November 2, 2023, in Las Vegas. Although the offense of murder carries the death penalty under Nevada state law, the prosecution confirmed they would not seek the death penalty for Davis, making life imprisonment the maximum possible sentence in Davis's case.

On November 7, 2023, Judge Carli Kierny for the Clark County District Court scheduled for Davis's trial to begin on June 3, 2024. On January 9, 2024, during a court status check, Davis was granted $750,000 bail and allowed house arrest. A second status check was held on February 20, 2024, during which it was agreed that Davis's trial would be delayed to November 4, 2024. Despite being granted bail and house arrest, Davis remained jailed at the Clark County Detention Center. In June 2024, an entertainment manager called Wack 100, tried to post Davis's bail via a Zoom call but was ultimately refused by judge Carli Kierny. Wack 100 said he paid $112,500 out of the $750,000 bail and the money came from his business. Prosecutors said Wack 100 wanted to record interviews with Davis after his release and profit off of the case. They provided evidence where Wack 100 admitted to the exact plan in a Vlad TV interview which caused the judge to refuse to Davis’s release.

A South Side Compton Crips affiliate testified to the grand jury that DeAndrae Smith fired the shots, saying Anderson had no clear line of fire from where he sat.

On February 18, 2025, Davis's trial was delayed until February 9, 2026. On August 5, 2025, Davis opted to change defense attorneys for his murder trial. As of September 2025, Davis still remained under detention at Clark County Detention Center. On November 18, 2025, Davis's trial was again delayed, this time to August 10, 2026. At this time, it was also reported that Davis was now incarcerated at Nevada's High Desert State Prison, where he is serving prison time for his jailhouse fight conviction.

=== Separate Davis conviction ===
On April 9, 2025, a jury convicted Davis for his role in an unrelated case involving one count of battery by a prisoner and one count of challenges to fight. On July 2, 2025, Davis was denied a request for a new trial. He was initially set to be sentenced August 7, 2025. His sentencing in his jailhouse fight case was later delayed after he opted to change attorneys for his murder case.

On September 3, 2025, Davis was sentenced to 16 to 40 months in prison for the jailhouse fight conviction, with credit for over seven months of the prison time he has already served. In November 2025, it was reported that Davis, who at the time of his September 2025 conviction was still jailed at Clark County Detention Center, was now serving his prison sentence for this conviction at Nevada's High Desert State Prison.

== Trial ==
State v. Davis
- Court: Clark County District Court in Las Vegas, Nevada
- Full case name: The State of Nevada v. Duane Keith Davis
- Started: August 17, 2026
- Decided: August 31, 2026
- Verdict: First-degree murder

Court membership
- Judge sitting: Carli Lynn Kierny

The jury selection for Davis's trial began on August 10, 2026, and the trial, presided over by Judge Carli Kierny, ran from August 17 to 31, 2026, in the Clark County District Court in Las Vegas. A jury of 10 women and 6 men were selected on August 13, to hear the case. Opening statements began on August 17.

=== Day one ===
On August 17, 2026, both sides made opening statements. Chief Deputy District Attorney Binu Palal started off by talking about the fight that happened at the MGM on September 7, 1996, and the shooting that occurred after. They mentioned the four people that were allegedly present in the white Cadillac. The prosecution's case relied on Davis's own statements from his 2019 memoir Compton Street Legend. Palal's argument was that although "Duane Davis did not pull the trigger, he did plan the shooting."

Meanwhile, Davis's defense attorney Michael Sanft started off by questioning evidence and why he had not been charged earlier. Afterwards, he brought up the three detectives who were involved in the case of Shakur's murder and the length of time they have been working on it; Detective Becker (1996–2001), detective Long (2002–2018), detective Mogg (2018–2023). He claimed that detective Mogg's work was "biased, sloppy, and incomplete." Sanft suggested that detectives rather put all of their effort into convicting his client instead of finding out other theories and possibilities for the murder.

Four people testified; former Las Vegas police officer Garry Dale, witness Ingrid Stokes, former Las Vegas police officer Brent Becker and former LAPD detective Fred Miller.

Garry Dale was the first witness called to testify. Dale was a police officer in Las Vegas on bike patrol the night of Tupac Shakur's shooting in 1996. He said he stopped Suge Knight's black BMW for having no back license plate with Shakur in the passenger seat. He and Chris Carroll rode with Shakur in an ambulance to the hospital after he was shot and Dale asked who had shot him. Shakur replied, "No, we'll take care of it." Dale confirmed that Shakur did say "fuck you" to Carroll afterwards as his last words.

The prosecution asked witness Brent Becker if information from the Las Vegas Metropolitan Police Department's investigation had been leaked. Becker explained how on a few occasions he returned to the files and found them "different" to how he left them. When asked by the prosecutor if he was aware that some of his fellow officers sold a polaroid picture of Shakur on the autopsy table to the Daily Mail newspaper, Becker responded that he saw someone walk into the room with a polaroid camera but did not see the photo get taken.

=== Day two ===
Seven people testified on day two of the trial. These people were crime-scene analyst Thomas Kern, forensic pathologist and medical examiner Dr. Lisa Gavin, investigator of MGM resorts Michael Ingram, former LVMPD sergeant Kenneth Rios, former hotel casino security officer William Hiedmeyer, former LVMPD officer Dean O'Kelly, former Mob Piru member James "Mob James" McDonald and, former Compton police officer and head of security and general manager for Death Row Records Reggie Wright Jr.

Lisa Gavin and the jurors were shown a photo of a green body bag Shakur was in followed by several graphic autopsy photos of his body. Gavin described three bullets, one of which traveled through Shakur's chest, piercing through a lung which caused his lung to collapse and bleed. Doctors tried to save his life by removing the damaged lung. Additional bullets damaged his intestines from travelling through his thigh. His ring finger was also shot off his hand. Gavin said Shakur's body was severely bloated and had multiple chest wounds. One photo showed the chest tubes that were still in his body from the six days he spent in the hospital before dying. Gavin also confirmed that Shakur had several scars that were associated with previous gunshot wounds that occurred years prior.

James "Mob James" McDonald testified under a legally binding subpoena. McDonald expressed multiple times that he did not want to cooperate and stated, "I'm aware of a lot of things, things that was going on. People ain't talked about it in 30 years. Today ain't one of them." McDonald even expressed a few times during the testimony that he did not "want to send him to prison," even though they did not particularly like each other. The defense brought up an old rumor that Shakur had once knocked McDonald out. McDonald denied it and said he would "have killed him, Suge Knight and even his own brother (Buntry)", if Shakur had ever knocked him out. He explained that a retaliation was inevitable if someone had humiliated him like that.

=== Day three ===
Two people testified on day three; former FBI agent Wade Lee and former LAPD detective Daryn Dupree.

Former FBI agent Wade Lee testified that Davis sat down with investigators in 1998 after being arrested for selling cocaine and began cooperating with authorities. Lee testified that during the 1998 proffer interview, Davis claimed that Death Row Records was funded partly by drug money and that Suge Knight and Reggie Wright Jr. controlled gang security elements. When asked about Shakur's murder, Davis speculated that Compton police officers or associates tied to Knight might have been involved, but denied any involvement in the homicide. During cross-examination, Lee acknowledged that law enforcement did not actively follow up on or verify Davis's allegations.

Former LAPD detective Daryn Dupree testified that he convinced Davis into cooperating (for The Notorious B.I.G. murder) by stating that he could be facing a potential federal life sentence. During a proffer session with the federal prosecutor and his attorney, Davis denied involvement in The Notorious B.I.G. murder but said "we did the other one." On December 18, 2008, in another proffer session with both detective Dupree and detective Greg Kading, Davis provided a detailed, recorded account of Shakur's shooting. On March 2009, Davis officially became a confidential informant and traveled to New York in an attempt to record Eric "Zip" Martin discussing money that Davis said Combs had promised for the killing. The recording produced no usable evidence.

=== Day four ===
Former South Side Crip member and former DEA informant Denvonta "Dirt Rock" Lee testified on day four. Lee testified that Deandre "Big Dre" Smith had claimed to Lee that he was the one who pulled the trigger on Shakur and not Anderson because Anderson did not have a clear line of fire while Smith did.

Prosecutors began playing a recording of the 2008 interview between LAPD detectives Daryn Dupree and Greg Kading, and Keefe D which was to investigate the murder of the Notorious B.I.G. Davis said that he was given a $1 million murder contract by Sean Combs on the head of Suge Knight and Tupac Shakur, and that the Mike Tyson fight was the perfect time to execute the hit after Shakur got into an altercation with his nephew a couple of hours prior. Davis stated that the gun, a .40 Glock, was provided by Combs’ associate Eric "Von Zip" Martin. He also said that before the interaction, rapper Foxy Brown was in the car and was asked by Zip to get out so "he can talk business." Minutes before the shooting, Keffe D, his nephew and their entourage waited in a white Cadillac for Shakur and Suge to show up at club 662. Davis told the cops they were going to give up until they heard a woman yell, “Tupac!” The Cadillac did a U-turn and pulled up alongside Suge’s BMW. Davis said he gave the gun to his nephew Orlando Anderson who fired the shots. Davis told investigators that Combs and the Notorious B.I.G.'s wife Faith Evans, called him to ask, “Was that us?”

=== Day five ===
Three people testified on day five: photographer Leonard Jefferson, filmmaker and showrunner of The Death Row Chronicles documentary Mario Diaz and, producer of the Murder Rap: Inside the Biggie and Tupac Murders documentary Michael Dorsey.

=== Day six ===
On August 31, the jury found Davis guilty of first-degree murder with a deadly weapon after deliberating for about three hours. The prosecution stated during its closing argument that Davis was a "shot caller" in the South Side Compton Crips, and that he "went hunting" for Shakur. The sentencing was set for October 13. Davis was ordered to be held without bond until then. Soon after the verdict came in, Davis told the judge he wanted to appeal, and asked for his confiscated phones and computers back.

=== Sentencing ===
On October 13, 2026, Davis was sentenced to 40 years to life in prison. He will be eligible for parole in 2066, when he will be 103 years old, making it likely that he will die in prison.

== See also ==
- List of assassinations
- List of homicides in Nevada
- List of murdered hip-hop musicians
