= Greg Kading =

Canadian-American detective (born 1963)

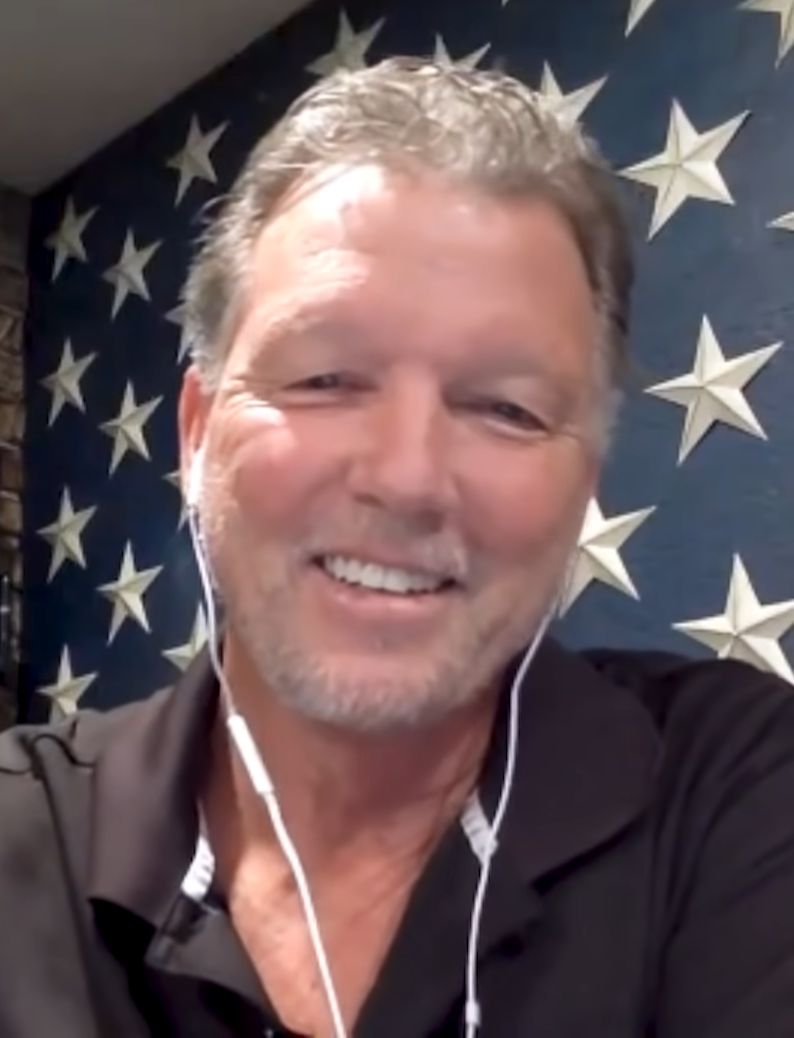
- Kading in 2022
- Born: Gregory James Kading; May 1, 1963 (age 63); Toronto, Ontario, Canada
- Police career
- Country: United States
- Department: Orange County Sheriff's Department; Los Angeles Police Department
- Service years: 1986–2010
- Rank: Sworn in as Deputy (1986); Sworn in as Officer (September 1988); Detective
- Other work: Non-fiction author Private investigator

Gregory James Kading (born May 1, 1963) is a Canadian-American author and former Los Angeles Police Department detective best known for working on a multi law-enforcement task force that investigated the murders of rappers Tupac Shakur and the Notorious B.I.G. in the mid-2000s. Many credit Kading and his LAPD task force for the 2023 arrest of Duane ‘Keffe D’ Davis for the September 1996 murder of Tupac.

== Early life and education ==
Greg Kading was born in Toronto, Ontario. He graduated from Capistrano Valley High School in Mission Viejo, California in 1981. He attended Cal State Long Beach and Calvary Chapel Bible College.

== Career ==
Kading was an Orange County Sheriff's Department deputy, where he worked in the jail, from January 1986 to September 1988. He then joined the Los Angeles Police Department in 1988.

He retired from the department, where he worked in the robbery-homicide division, after 22 years of service in June 2010. The following year, Kading released his book. A full-length documentary adapted from his book began shooting in 2013.

He works as a private investigator in Winnipeg, Manitoba.

In February 2021, Kading was featured in the Netflix docu-series Crime Scene: The Vanishing at the Cecil Hotel that covers the death of Elisa Lam.

== Book ==
In September 2011, he self-published the book Murder Rap: The Untold Story of the Biggie Smalls & Tupac Shakur Murder Investigations. In it, he included new evidence in the rappers' murders that he said implicated entertainment mogul Sean Combs and CEO of Death Row Records, Suge Knight. The release prompted what MediaBistro.com called "a new round of explosive media coverage about the unsolved killings".

Combs responded to the allegation by telling Los Angeles local reporters in emails that "this story is pure fiction and completely ridiculous". Knight has not addressed the claim. Lil' Cease, a rapper and childhood friend of Smalls, told radio host Sway Calloway on the "Sway in the Morning"-show that he didn't believe Combs had ordered Shakur's shooting as Kading alleged in his book.

In response to Combs's denial of the claims, Kading said on the All-out-Attack-Podcast with Harry Robinson that Combs needs to "let the people have what they deserve, and what they deserve is the truth".

The book also details what Kading described as the behind-the-scenes failure by the LVMPD and LAPD to arrest Shakur's and Wallace's killers. The families of Shakur and Wallace have not responded to the allegations.
