= Set (gang) =

Subgroup in a gang alliance

In gang terminology, a set refers to a subgroup within a larger gang alliance. Sets vary in size and internal structure, and different sets within the same gang are known to fight one another.

== Structure and activities ==
A large gang alliance, such as the Crips or Bloods, is usually composed of many smaller subgroups known as "sets". Despite being part of the same gang alliance, sets differ from one another in terms of internal structure, membership, and gang symbols.

=== Hierarchy ===
Within the same gang alliance, different sets have been known to have varying levels of hierarchy. For example, some Bloods sets have been noted for having various ranks within the set, while other Bloods sets have little to no hierarchy.

=== Membership ===
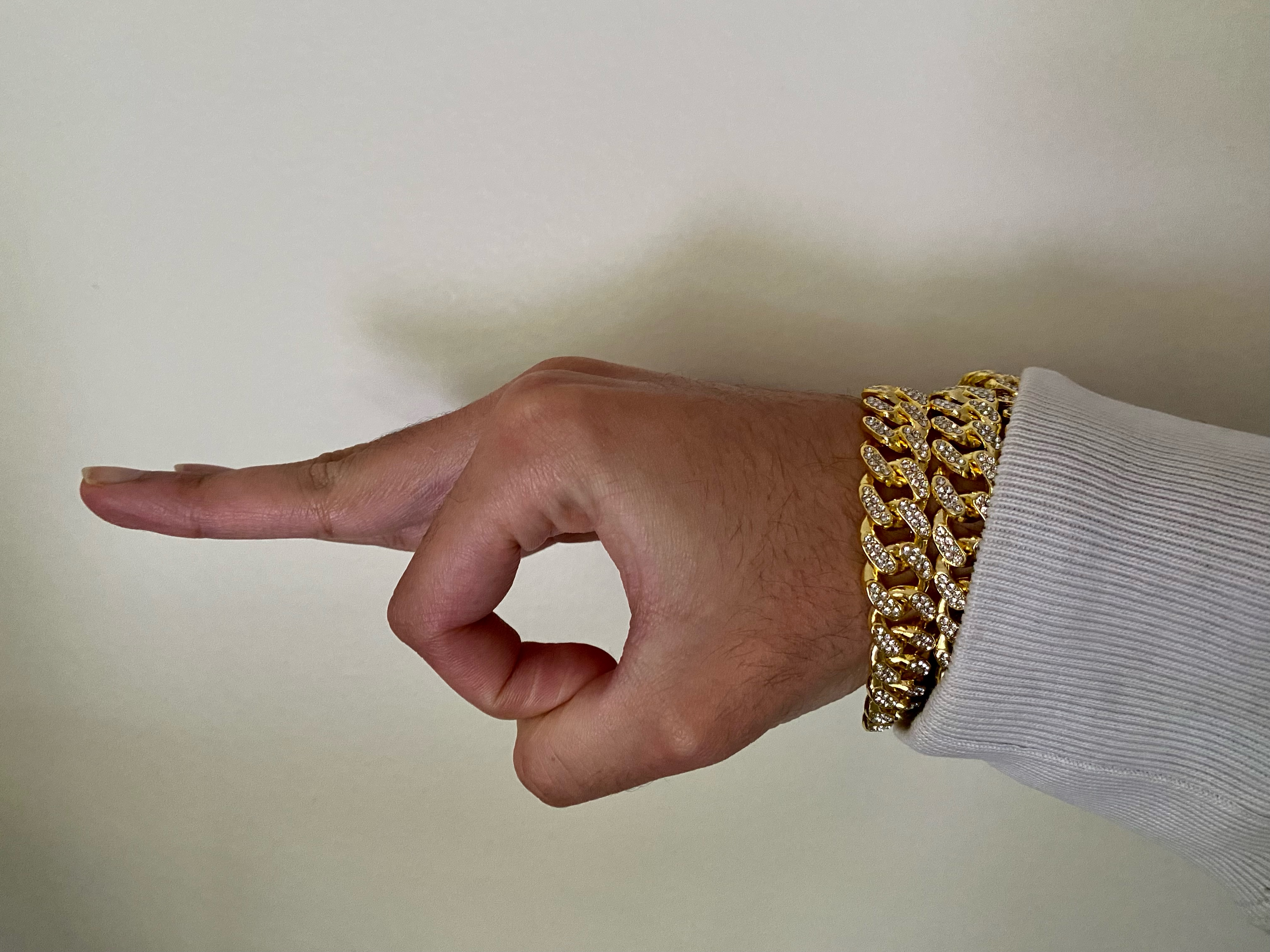
Gang sign used by the Mob Piru set of the Bloods

Sets vary considerably in membership size. For example, some of the larger Crips sets, such as the Rollin' 60s Neighborhood Crips have over 1,600 members and are present in multiple cities across the United States. In comparison, smaller sets such as the Butler Block Crips have 8-10 members and are limited to a particular neighborhood.

=== Gang signs and colors ===
Sets within the same gang alliance may differ in their gang sign and colors. For example, even though Bloods sets will often use red as a gang color, some Bloods sets use other colors, such as the Lime Hood Piru, who use green.

=== Relationship with other sets ===
Each set in a gang has a unique relationship with every other set within the overarching gang. Sets within the same gang have been known to fight one another. For example, the Rollin' 60s Neighborhood Crips and the Eight Trey Gangster Crips have been rivals since 1979, despite both being Crip sets. Furthermore, the relationship between two sets from the same gang can change over time. For example, the Mob Piru Bloods and the Lueders Park Piru Bloods were allies until April 2009, when a feud erupted between the two Bloods sets.

In some cases, a set from one gang may form an alliance with a specific set from a rival gang. For example, the PJ Watts Crips are known for their alliance with the Bounty Hunter Watts Bloods. This alliance formed due to mutual opposition to the Grape Street Watts Crips set.

Conflict between rival sets is referred to as "set tripping".

== Portrayals in media ==
Rappers often make references to sets when describing gang activities in their music. For example, Tupac Shakur's "Hail Mary" (1997) makes references to "set tripping".
