= Rollin' 90s Neighborhood Crips =

Crips gang alliance

- Ethnicity: Primarily African-American
- Activities: Drug trafficking Murder
- Allies: Rollin' 60s Neighborhood Crips
- Rivals: Eight Trey Gangster Crips; Crenshaw Mafia Gangster Bloods

The Rollin' 90s Neighborhood Crips are a "set" of the larger Crips gang alliance, located on the west side of South Los Angeles, California. The gang has since spread to other parts of the United States.

== History ==
=== Formation ===
According to one source, the Rollin' 90s Crips branched off from the Rollin' 60s Crips, retaining the "Rollin' Crips" name.

Another source indicates that the Rollin' 90s Crips formed independently from the Rollin' 60s Crips, but later formed an alliance at a 1983 party, where some members of the Rollin' 60s Crips noted that the names of both gangs ended with "0". As a result, the two gangs decided to unite, and this alliance has since spread to other gangs, including the Rollin' 40s Crips.

=== Rivalry with the Eight Tray Gangster Crips ===
In 1979, a rivalry developed between the Rollin's 60s Crips and Eight Tray Gangster Crips. The rivalry developed after a fight occurred between a member of the Rollin's 60 Crips and the Eight Tray Gangster Crips over a girl. As a result of this rivalry, many gangs had to side with either the Rollin's 60 Crips or the Eight Tray Gangster Crips. The Rollin' 90s Neighborhood Crips became allies with the Rollin's 60 Crips.

=== Expanding to Nashville ===
By the mid-1990s, the Rollin's 90 Crips had expanded to Nashville, Tennessee. This Nashville set was founded by Jamal Shakir and would become known as the East Nashville Crips. This set would engage in drug trafficking, and Shakir, along with two other men, would be charged for the murders of seven people.

=== Murder of Justin Holmes ===
In 2017, three members of the Rollin's 90 Cripss were arrested for the murder of 21-year-old Justin Holmes, who was wrongly identified as a member of the Eight Trey Gangster Crips. The case received national attention, as one of the defendants, Cameron Terrell, was white and came from an affluent background.

=== Expanding to Canada ===
Around 2016–17, a new set of the Rollin's 90 Crips formed in the west side area of Montreal, Canada. The gang is alleged to be one of the most powerful and violent gangs in the city since 2023 and is known for assassinations, home invasions, drug and gun trafficking, and credit card fraud.
