= Crips–Bloods gang war =

Street gang rivalry originating in the US

- Part of War on drugs
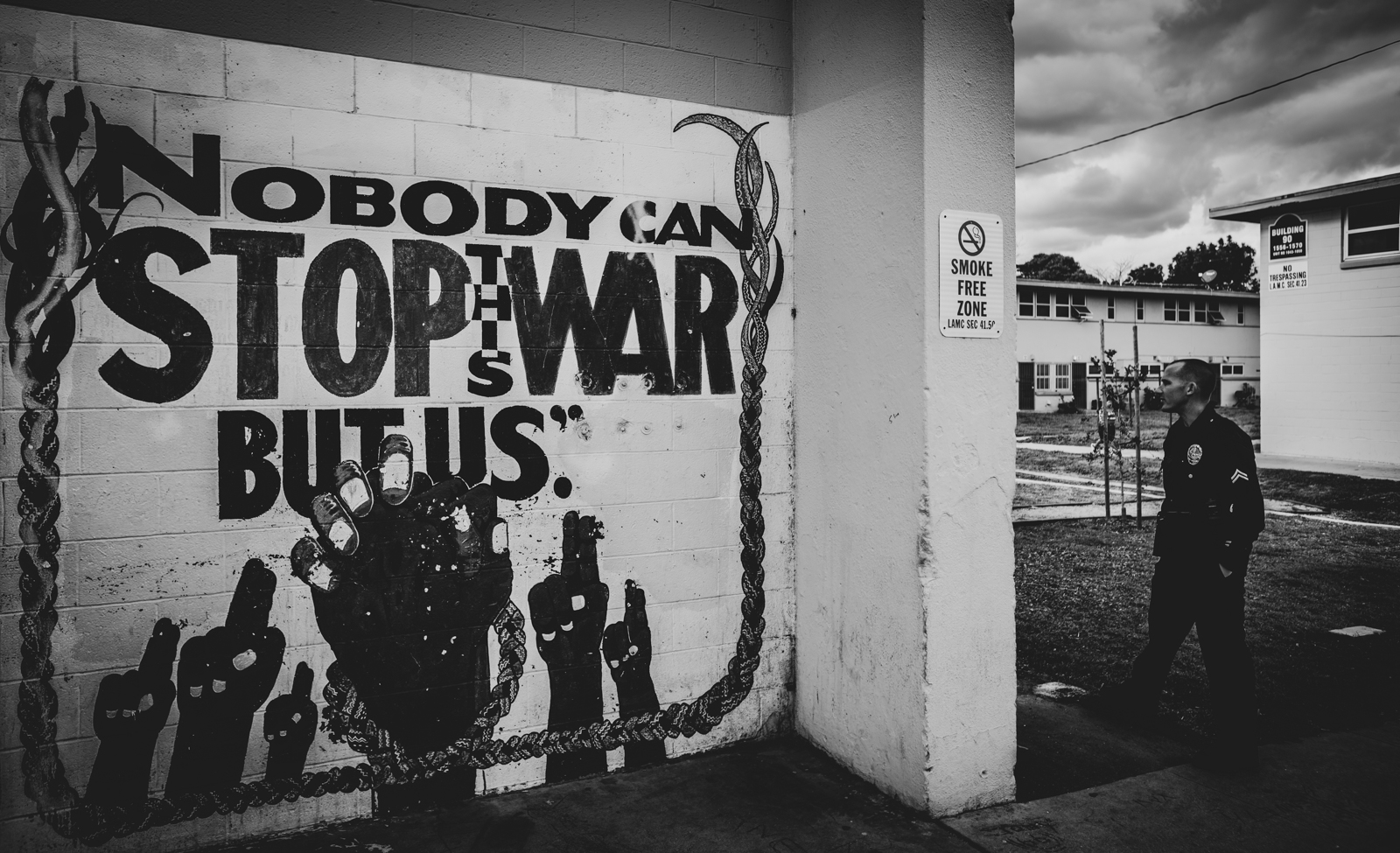
- A mural referencing the war, at the Nickerson Gardens housing project in Los Angeles (pictured in 2019)
Date
Location
~1971–present
- United States
- Canada
- Belize
- The Netherlands
- Australia
- New Zealand
- England

Gangs
Crips (belligerent sets listed below)	Bloods (belligerent sets listed below)

Commanders and leaders
Raymond Washington X Stanley Williams (executed); Dalmin Mayen	Sylvester Scott †; Vincent Benson Owens; Omar Portee

Casualties and losses
- 15,000–20,000 people killed during the conflict

The Crips and the Bloods, two majority-Black street gangs founded in Los Angeles, have been in a gang war since around 1971. While it has mostly taken place in Los Angeles and other major American cities, it has presence in Australia, Belize, Canada, the Netherlands, New Zealand, and the United Kingdom as well. The war is made up of small, local conflicts between the two gangs' chapters, or "sets". An estimated 20,000 people have died from the overall war as of 2014.

In the 1970s, a variety of socio-economic issues in South Central Los Angeles led to the emergence of gangs like the Crips, who claimed city territory and guarded it from other gangs. The Bloods formed to counter Crip influence. Both groups started extorting money from local businesses and distributing crack cocaine. In the 1980s, the war reached other countries. By then, the gangs' members often identified themselves using clothing colored blue for Crips and red for Bloods. Those wearing a gang's colors in an opposing gang's territory were often targets of violence; this trend had declined by 2014.

The Los Angeles Police Department (LAPD) targeted the gangs' sets in the city. The LAPD's 1987 anti-gang initiative, Operation Hammer, primarily consisted of large, recurring raids in areas known for gang activity and led to mass incarceration. However, the raids did not greatly succeed in reducing gang violence, while aggravating racial tensions due to accusations of racial profiling. In response, the gangs' Los Angeles sets gained a sense of solidarity, and in 1992, signed a truce in the city conflict; violence resumed in 1993 due to continuing tensions and economic instability. New policies enacted by the city starting in 2006 lowered the severity of violence, but it still continued. In 2012, a major conflict in the village of Hempstead, New York, led to at least 56 people being shot.

== Background ==
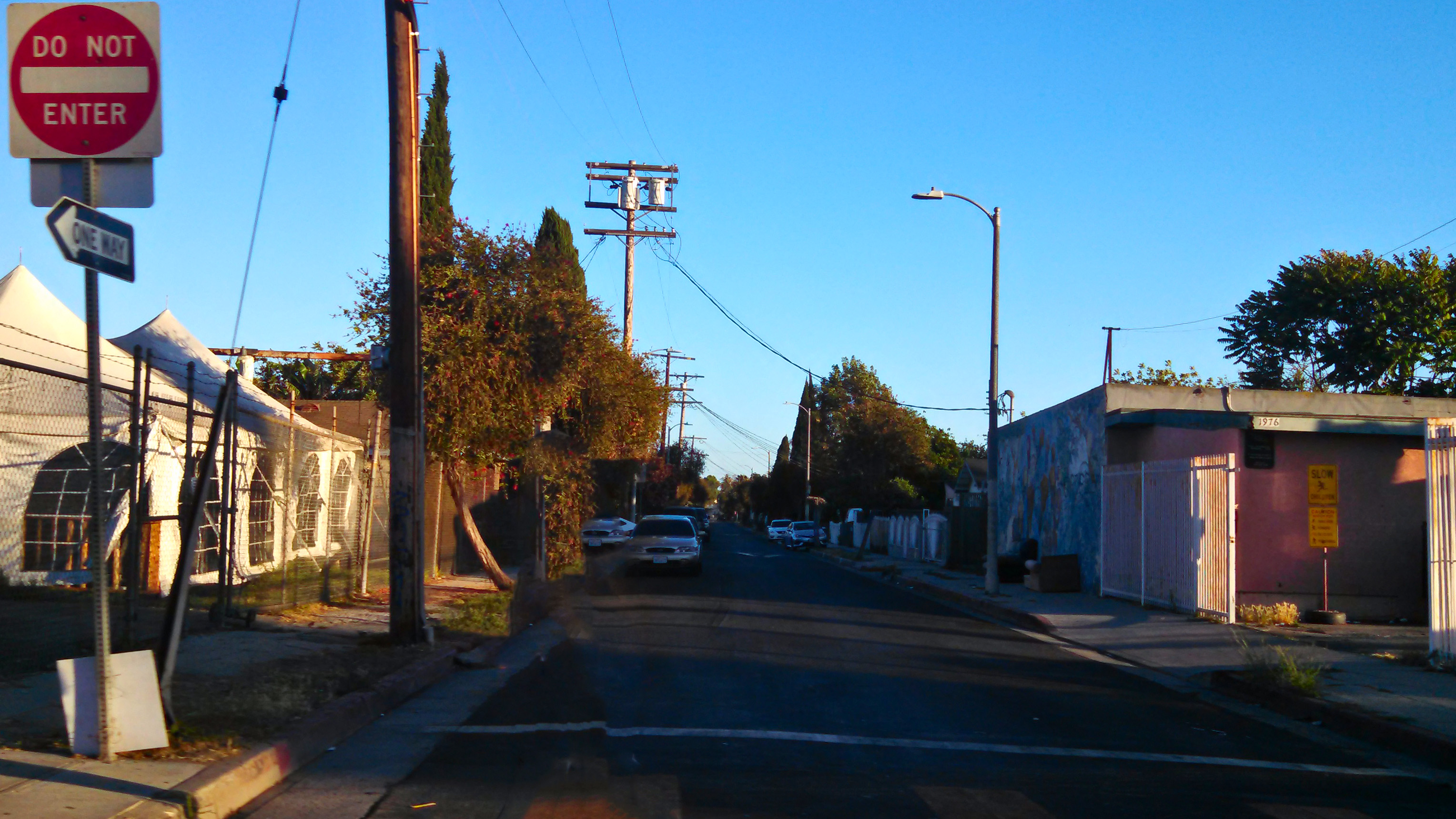
A residential street of Watts, Los Angeles

In the 1960s and '70s, few job opportunities for young Black men in South Central Los Angeles—especially the neighborhood of Watts—led to the formation of gangs who claimed territories in the city, guarding them from other gangs. Street gangs were also a remaining way for them to respond to "White violence and intimidation" in the city after political action groups espousing black power, like the Black Panther Party, were targeted by the government through COINTELPRO and other methods.

The Crips' origins are debated, but they might have been formed by Raymond Washington and Stanley "Tookie" Williams in 1971 as a form of protection from other gangs. However it started, Williams did become the Crips' leader. He "ruled by terror", bringing "impressionable youths" into the group and causing shootings across the city; in turn, multiple groups formed in response to the Crips, including the Bloods. The Bloods' original faction, the Piru Street Boys or simply Pirus, was formed by student Sylvester Scott, after he and fellow student Benson Owens were attacked by Washington and other Crips. Owens eventually formed the West Piru faction of Bloods.

== History ==
=== 1970s ===
The Crip and Bloods went to war with each other to defend their territory. They fought each other with cheap "Saturday night special" handguns, switchblades, Molotov cocktails, as well as through hand-to-hand combat. They also participated in theft, facilitated by the establishment of protection rackets to extort money from local businesses. In 1979, Washington died in a gang-related shooting, and Williams committed four murders which would bring him a death sentence in 1981, carried out in 2005.

In the 1970s, law enforcement agencies heavily patrolled the South Central area, after civilians had been participating in "collective violence" against local government in the 1960s and 70s. In 1972, Los Angeles County created a "Street Gang Detail" LAPD unit to combat violent groups. Gang enforcement in turn led to greater membership and numbers of gangs in Watts, Compton, and Inglewood. In 1977, the police unit CRASH started, which targeted gangs mainly in the Watts housing projects of Imperial Courts, Nickerson Gardens, and Jordan Downs. (Note: Starting in 1998, during the Rampart scandal, many CRASH officers were implicated in and accused of multiple crimes similar to the gangs they were targeting, such as murdering innocent people, and framing the murders on other innocent people; drug dealing; and theft. Three CRASH officers—David Mack, Kevin Gaines, and Rafael Pérez—had connections to the Bloods while on the force.)

=== 1980s ===
In the early 1980s, drug trafficker Freeway Rick Ross introduced crack cocaine to South Los Angeles Bloods and Crips gangs, and both gangs became distributors. Watts housing projects became "open-air drug markets". By the mid-1980s, the gangs had more advanced weapons, including submachine guns like MAC-10s and Uzis. The amount of weaponry available increased the number of deaths in drive-by shootings, which resulted in the deaths of many civilians and led to a greater police response. The Reagan administration supported the removal of many Americans from welfare rolls, food stamps, and school lunch programs, which worsened the conflict. California greatly increased its spending on policing and incarceration in the late 1980s. Despite a fourth of Los Angeles gang members being arrested by 1992, gang controls measures were considered to have failed.

Examples of Crip/Blood identification

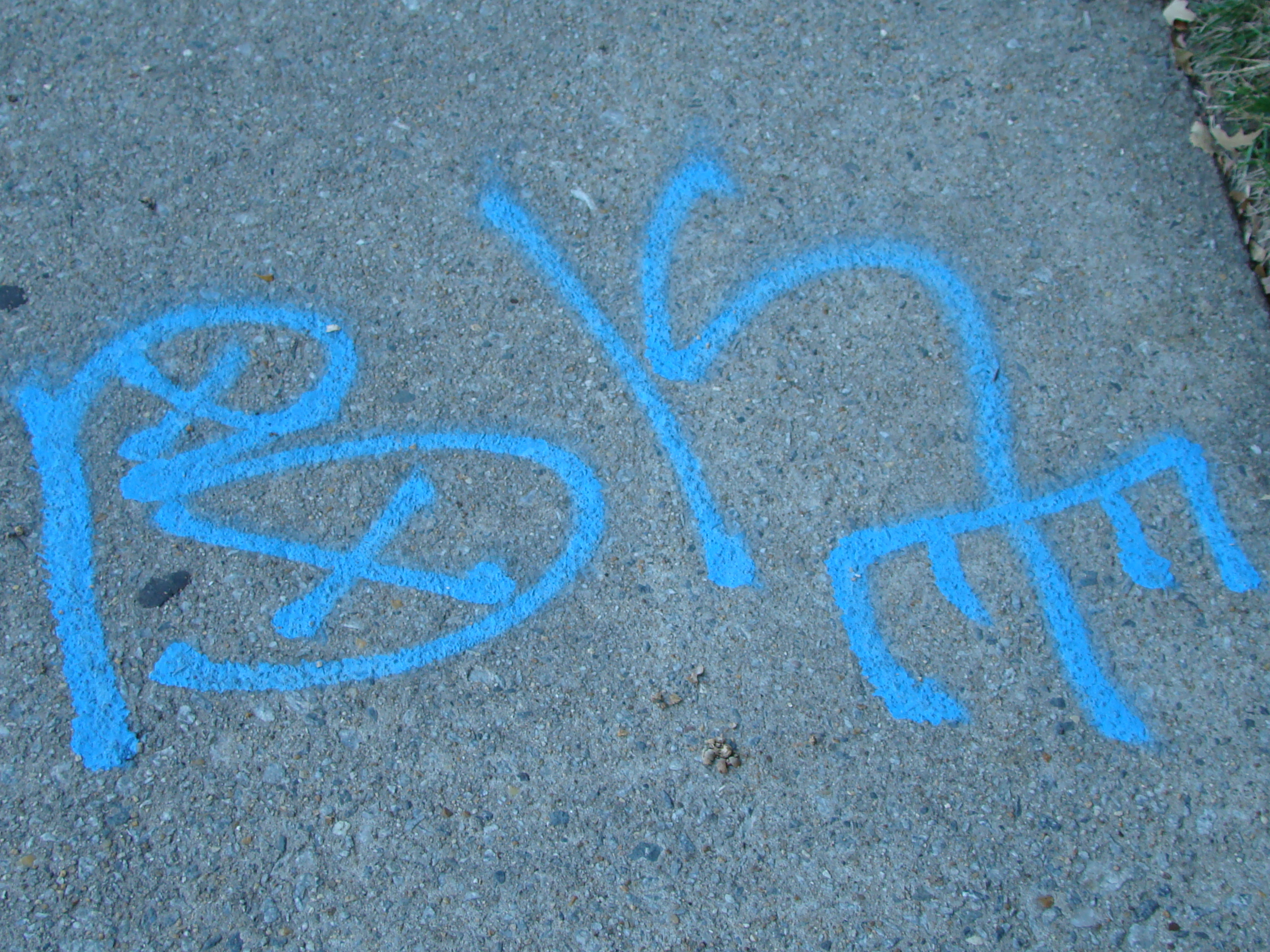
"Blood Killer" graffiti made by a Crip, using the Crips' color blue

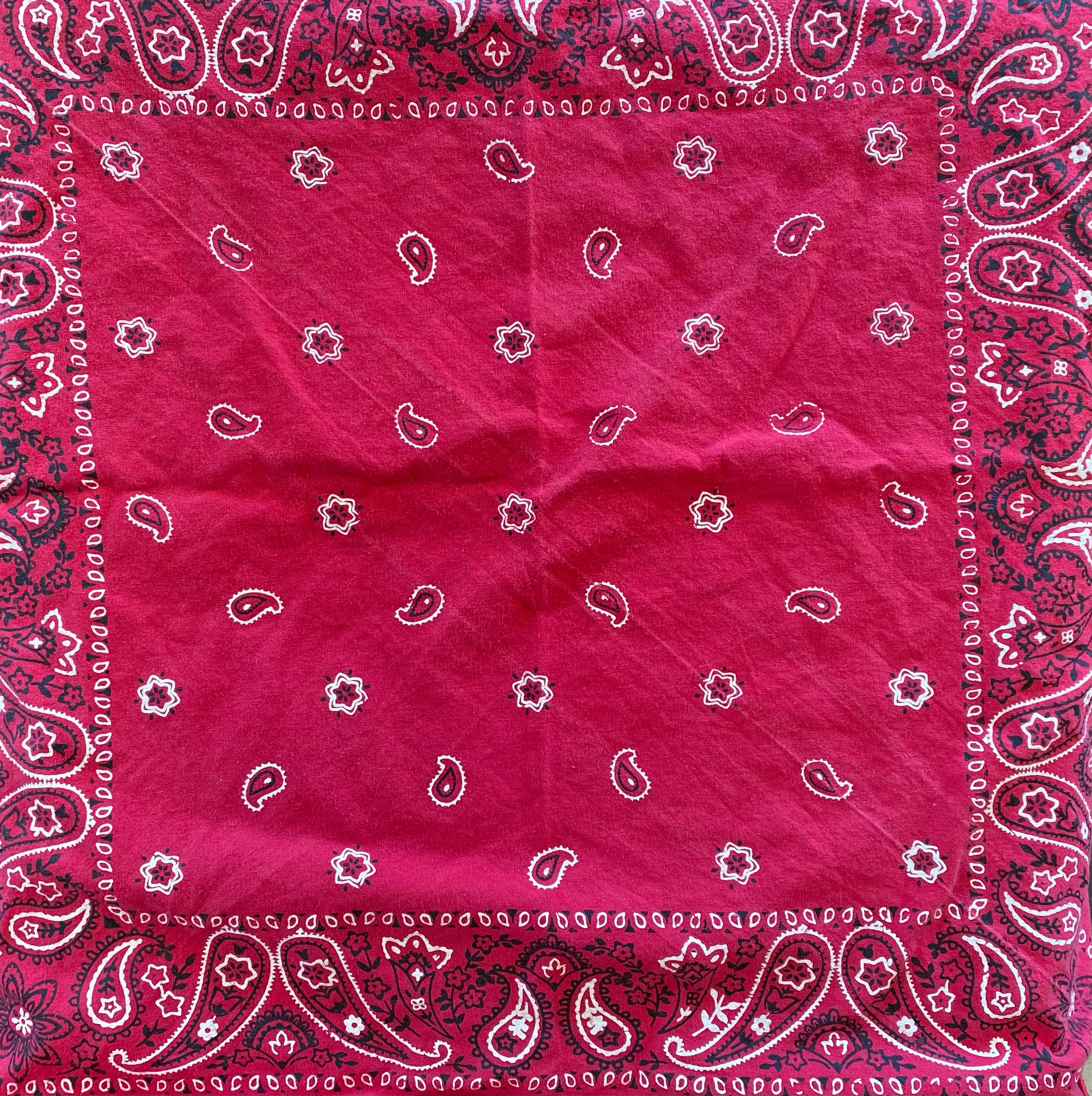
A red-paisley bandana, often used by Piru Bloods to identify themselves

By this time, the two gangs often identified themselves using clothing colored blue for Crips and red for Bloods; those wearing their gang's colors ('color banging') in the other gang's territory were often targets of violence. Non-gang members who mistakenly wore the colors were thus also targeted. In 2014, Business Insider wrote that gang colors and tattoos had stopped being used, so members could avoid scrutiny from law enforcement, witnesses to their crimes, or potential employers. Instead, the colors started being worn only at gang meetups, and gang identification was done online instead.

==== Belize theater ====
In the 1980s, many African-descending gang members from Belize living in California (who were immigrants to the U.S. after a 1961 hurricane in Belize) were deported back to their original country. This Crips–Bloods war was brought back to Belize City. The war in the city grew after the release of the 1988 film Colors, whose plot involves the two gangs in Los Angeles. By 2012, there were 20 to 25 different gangs in the city with some affiliation to either the Crips or Bloods. The war has continued due to conflicts in drug distribution; cocaine left in the ocean by drug cartels has washed up on the shores of Belize for years.

==== Prelude to 1992 Los Angeles truce ====
In the summer of 1987, as a response to the crack epidemic, LAPD officers started Operation Hammer in Los Angeles, which had a goal of "[making] life miserable" for gang members by arresting them for misdemeanors like traffic citations. Large numbers of arrests were made daily. They also performed raids which vandalized local homes; this and similar "gang-like" behavior lead to mass violence and arson. The reaction to the violence among some was a sense of "solidarity" that led to discussions (starting in summer 1988) of a ceasefire in the gang war amongst the members of the Bounty Hunter Bloods, Grape Street Crips, Hacienda Village Pirus, and the PJ Watts Crips.

In the years leading to the 1992 truce, despite talks of peace negotiations, gang-related crime was at a peak in Los Angeles. Skipp Townsend, a Rollin' 20 Blood from the West Adams neighborhood, said of the time: "I mean, I couldn't even pump gas. I couldn't go to the grocery store. I couldn't do anything without interacting with someone who would want to hurt me, or I'd have to hurt them." In 1990, the Los Angeles County Sheriff's Department (LASD) identified 22,594 Crips and 8,251 Bloods in their jurisdiction. By this time, both gangs started fighting for territory from the growing, majority-Hispanic 18th Street gang, which the LASD found to have 6,000 members.

=== 1990s ===
==== 1992 Los Angeles truce and riots ====
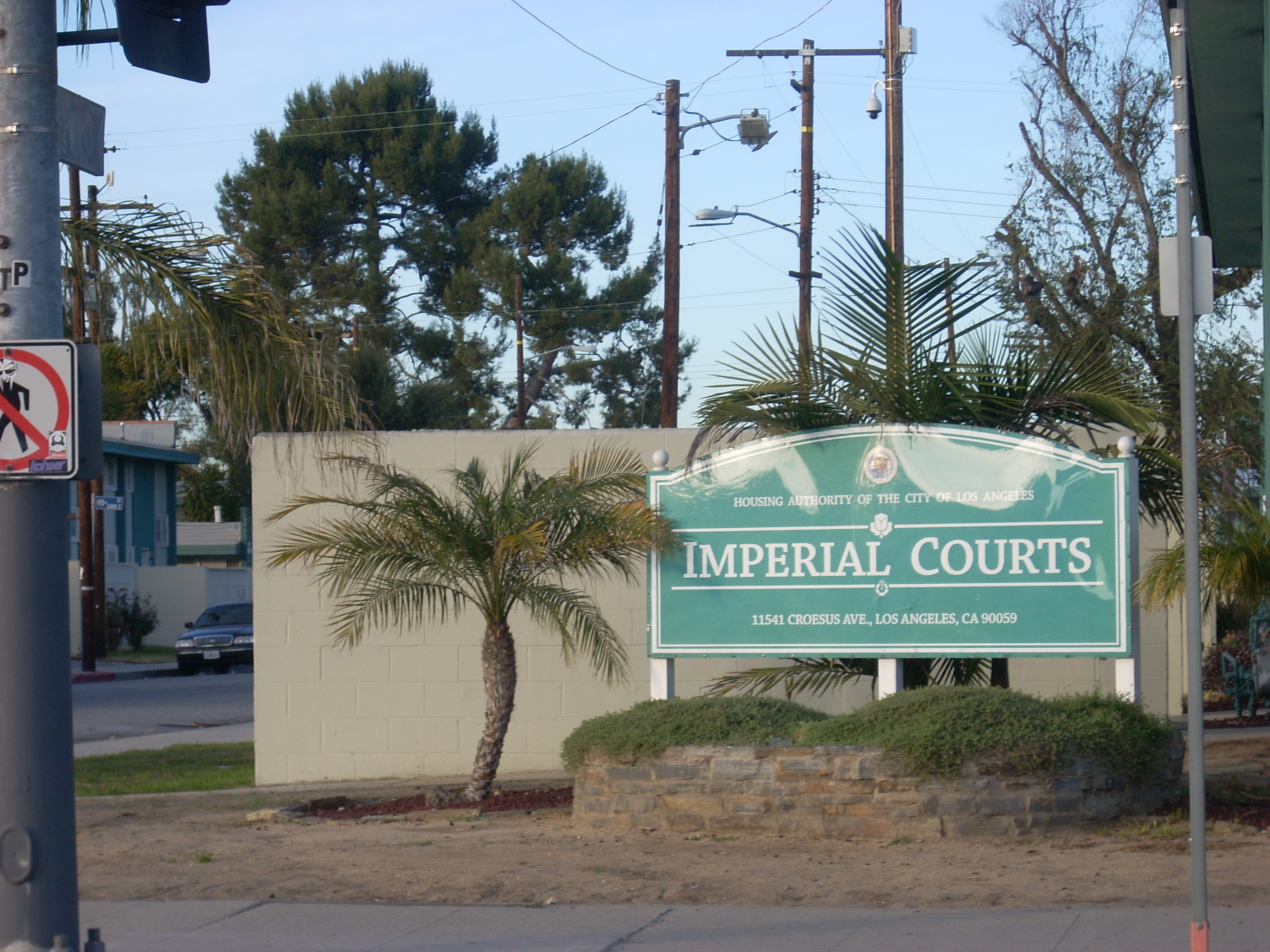
The Imperial Courts housing project

In the early 1990s, the Amer-I-Can program (led by former NFL player Jim Brown) had been holding discreet meetings on "the principles of responsibility and self-determination". Many of the men in these meetings went on to organize a truce that happened between the Grape Street Crips and their rivals, the PJ Watts Crips, as well as both of their rivals, the Hunter and Hacienda Bloods sets, at the Imperial Courts housing project (home of the PJ Watts Crips) on April 28, 1992. The 1992 Los Angeles riots on April 29 were over the acquittal of the LAPD officers who beat Rodney King. They involved mass looting and arson, and were ended by a massive law enforcement presence on May 4. Meanwhile, starting the night of the truce and continuing through the riots, the Crips and Bloods partied together at the Imperial Courts and Nickerson Gardens projects.

The Crips and Bloods decided the riots were "an opportunity to transform themselves and their community". During the riots, graffiti was made across the city advertising the truce. On May 3, the Pirus joined the truce. On May 16 and 17, as the National Guard was being withdrawn from Los Angeles, the Crips and Bloods sponsored a Saturday "unity picnic" and a Sunday family event which welcomed members of the community. More than 5,000 people (including Congresswoman Maxine Waters) showed up to these events, including members of both gangs. A final treaty between gangs featured a code of ethics that included the phrase: "I accept the duty to honor, uphold and defend the spirit of the red, blue and purple [the colors of the Watts gangs], to teach the black [sic] family its legacy and protracted struggle for freedom and justice." It also prohibited the throwing up of gang signs.

Community organizers created the Community Against Police Abuse and Community Youth Gang Services with the goal of stopping future violence. They also pushed for more employment opportunities, to offset the number of people who got involved in gang conflict because they could make money from the gangs' drug trade. The reforms made by the community after the riot temporarily decreased violence and led to the association of members of both gangs. In 1993, gang-related deaths in Los Angeles decreased by 10 percent, the first decrease since 1984.

==== Failure of gang reforms ====
After the truce, sneakers made by the company Eurostar were manufactured which featured gang colors or the colors of the Pan-African flag, to promote the truce; "TRUCE" was written on the heels. President George H. W. Bush praised Eurostar, which promised to use the profits to pay employees who would be former gang members. The promise was unfulfilled, as Eurostar faltered by the summer of 1993.

The LAPD claimed that the truce included a pledge among gang members to commit violence against police. This led to a greater police patrol, which went against community organizers' wishes. They also arrested many people who were celebrating the truce in hopes that they would be angered and commit violence.

In mid-May 1992, members of the Crips and Bloods drafted a proposal for the city's new Rebuild LA city program, requesting a $3.728 billion investment in gang-affected communities. Rebuild LA chose not to work with the gangs, and so the proposal failed; however, it nonetheless influenced lawmakers' policies. Rebuild LA invested far less into affected communities than it had pledged, and by 1997, it disbanded. One of the organizers of the truce said that despite a decrease in gang violence, "this community [Watts] is more hopeless now that it was before", and that "they have no hope that anything is gonna change". The truce made in 1992 would last for about a few months. Time magazine wrote: "Given the continued lack of jobs, substandard housing, limited educational opportunities, and police harassment—all of the conditions that precipitated the rebellion in the first place—the old status quo seemed destined to reemerge. Crime, collective mistrust, and exhaustive policing ultimately prevailed."

==== Murder of Tupac Shakur ====
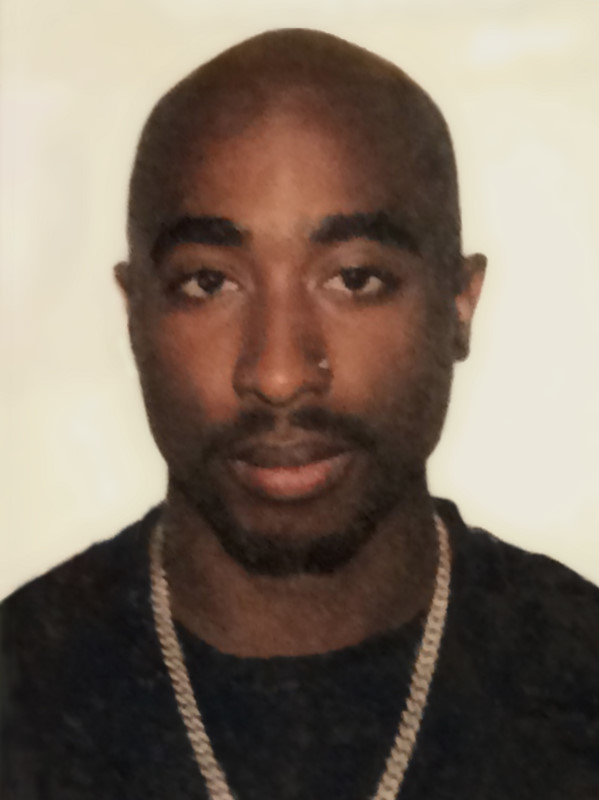
Tupac Shakur c. 1995

The rapper and actor Tupac Shakur was murdered in Las Vegas in September 1996; he was shot on the 7th and died from his wounds on the 13th. His music was released under the Death Row Records label headed by Suge Knight; Shakur was killed while being driven by Knight through the city.

In 2021, a report by the Los Angeles Times claimed the murder was committed by Crips as part of the Crips–Bloods war. Shakur, Knight, and Death Row Records were associated with the Mob Piru set of the Bloods from Compton. Allegedly, before the murder, a Southside Crip, whom are a rival gang to the Mob Piru gang in Compton, named Orlando Anderson was involved in the beating and robbing of one of Shakur's bodyguards, Trevon Lane, by Crips in Lakewood, California. Afterwards, Anderson threatened to rip the Death Row Records medallion off of the bodyguard's neck, which was seen as an insult to the Pirus. Before Shakur's murder on September 7, Shakur attended a boxing match at the MGM Grand Hotel in Las Vegas. On his way out with his bodyguards, one of them noticed Anderson, and Shakur came over to Anderson. Shakur asked Anderson, "You from the South?", and then beat him with help from Knight and their affiliates. According to Keffe D, uncle of Orlando Anderson, the South Side Crips then decided to kill Shakur later that day.

=== 2000s ===
The Watts Gang Task Force included Cynthia Mendenhall, who was a high-ranking member of the PJ Crips in the 1980s. She had planned to build a charter school in Watts, which was criticized by Maxine Waters. The two had a public feud, which led to Mendenhall getting support from local Republican politicians. However, she decided to leave the task force. On April 26, 2006, Mendenhall's son Anthony Owens was shot and killed outside Imperial Courts, in a drive-by shooting perpetrated by the Carver Park Compton Crips. The hospital Owens was being treated at was visited by the PJ Crips, Grape Street Crips, and Bounty Hunter Bloods. Mendenhall told the crowd that Owens had died and pleaded with them not to seek revenge. Police honored her as a peacemaker, and provided to her a motorcade escort to the funeral, which was visited by Los Angeles Mayor Antonio Villaraigosa.

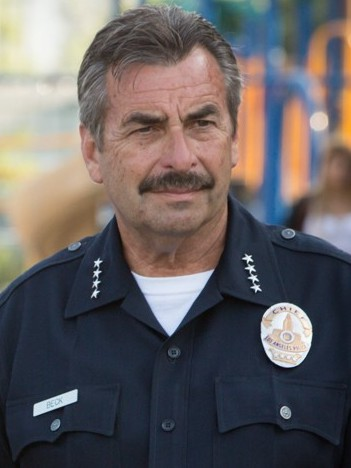
Charlie Beck in 2014

In 2006, Charlie Beck, a former CRASH officer, became Deputy Chief for the South Bureau of the Los Angeles Police Department. He worked with civil rights lawyer Connie Rice to develop "a plan to train, certify and deploy gang-intervention workers to the city's hot spots". Villaraigosa also changed the city's method of dealing with gangs by spending $21 million of his office's annual budget on the city's Gang Reduction and Youth Development program. The New York Times described the program as such: "Schools in neighborhoods with the highest gang presence, including Watts, now systematically identify the most at-risk children for extra services; gang-intervention workers receive city financing; and the city provides summer activities through its Summer Night Lights programs, which keeps parks and recreation centers open later in high-crime neighborhoods." Beck became the chief of the LAPD in 2009. His tenure was successful; from 2011 to 2013, violent crime fell by 30% in Watts.

=== 2010s ===
In 2011, a conflict started in San Diego, California, when a member of a Bloods-connected gang was killed by the Crips. Prosecutors claimed that a member of the Bloods gang, Nicholas Hoskins, made an agreement with at least 20 fellow members to kill Bloods. He was convicted and sentenced to 25 years in prison, but the conviction was thrown out by the California Supreme Court in 2022, saying there was no evidence of conspiracy.

In 2012, there was a major conflict in and around the village of Hempstead, New York (mostly in the village's Linden Triangle neighborhood), which led to 56 people being shot by the end of the year (40 of them within Hempstead). 10 of them died, and three became fully or partially paralyzed. The war ended when the Crips lured two of the Bloods' leaders into an ambush under the guise of negotiating a truce. Those Bloods then associated with a gang called the Very Crispy Gangsters.

By 2014, an estimated 20,000 people had died from the wider war. In April 2015, Baltimore's police department announced that there was a "credible threat" of violence from the city's Crips, Bloods, and Black Guerrilla Family, saying that the three gangs had formed a partnership. There was a popular theory among "observers" of the police department (including Slate magazine) that this announcement was fake, and used to distract the public from the department's poor image. In June 2015, there was a large fight between Crips and Bloods inside the Otis Bantum Correctional Center in New York, which prison officials broke up; rapper Bobby Shmurda, a Crip, was involved. In 2016, police in Edmonton, Canada, said that fighting between Crips and Bloods over the local drug trade had started. Also that year, Bloods and Crips in Atlanta cooperated during Black Lives Matter protests over the deaths of Alton Sterling and Philando Castile.

In December 2017, a leader of the Bloods in Franklin, Virginia, Brandon Lee Leonard, was shot and left in a ditch behind his girlfriend's house some time after getting into a confrontation with a member of a rival gang affiliated with the Crips. Hours after Leonard was found dead, a drive-by shooting happened at the house of the gang member who had fought with Leonard. Nobody was injured, but "a bullet narrowly missed the gang member's mother, who was asleep". Two Crips were shot the next day, one seriously injured. The conflict paused until 2019, when a Crip posted on social media a scoreboard "showing the Crips leading the Bloods 1-0". A few days later, on Leonard's birthday, a Crip posted a video in which he sang "Happy Birthday" to Leonard, and then mimicked gunshot sounds. Later that day, he was seriously injured in a shooting by Bloods. Five local Bloods had been sent to prison for the Franklin gang war by 2024.

On March 31, 2019, popular rapper Nipsey Hussle, a member of the Rollin' 60s Crip gang, was murdered in Crenshaw, Los Angeles by Eric Holder, Jr., another member of the Rollin' 60s. Nipsey Hussle was well-liked among both Crips and Bloods for his peaceful relations with the Bloods, which included bringing them on stage to perform with him. His death led to the most peace negotiations between the gangs since the 1992 truce. This started with a public meeting between the Swamp Crips and Campanella Park Pirus at Van Ness Park, and continued for multiple meetings at a location east of the 110 Freeway.

=== 2020s ===
In 2020, an up-and-coming Blood rapper from Fort Worth, Texas, named Javien Calvin Wright ("J-Dub"), was fatally shot outside of his residence. "Arguing and posturing" regarding his death began on social media; notably, a YouTube vlogger uploaded a video titled "Why Channel-5 J-Dub is dead.", which featured clips of people celebrating while holding guns and wads of money. This conflict over Wright, which began to involve members of gangs on the east and south sides of Fort Worth, led to a gathering of over 400 people at the city's Village Creek Park on May 10. At the park, there was a shooting which wounded five people.

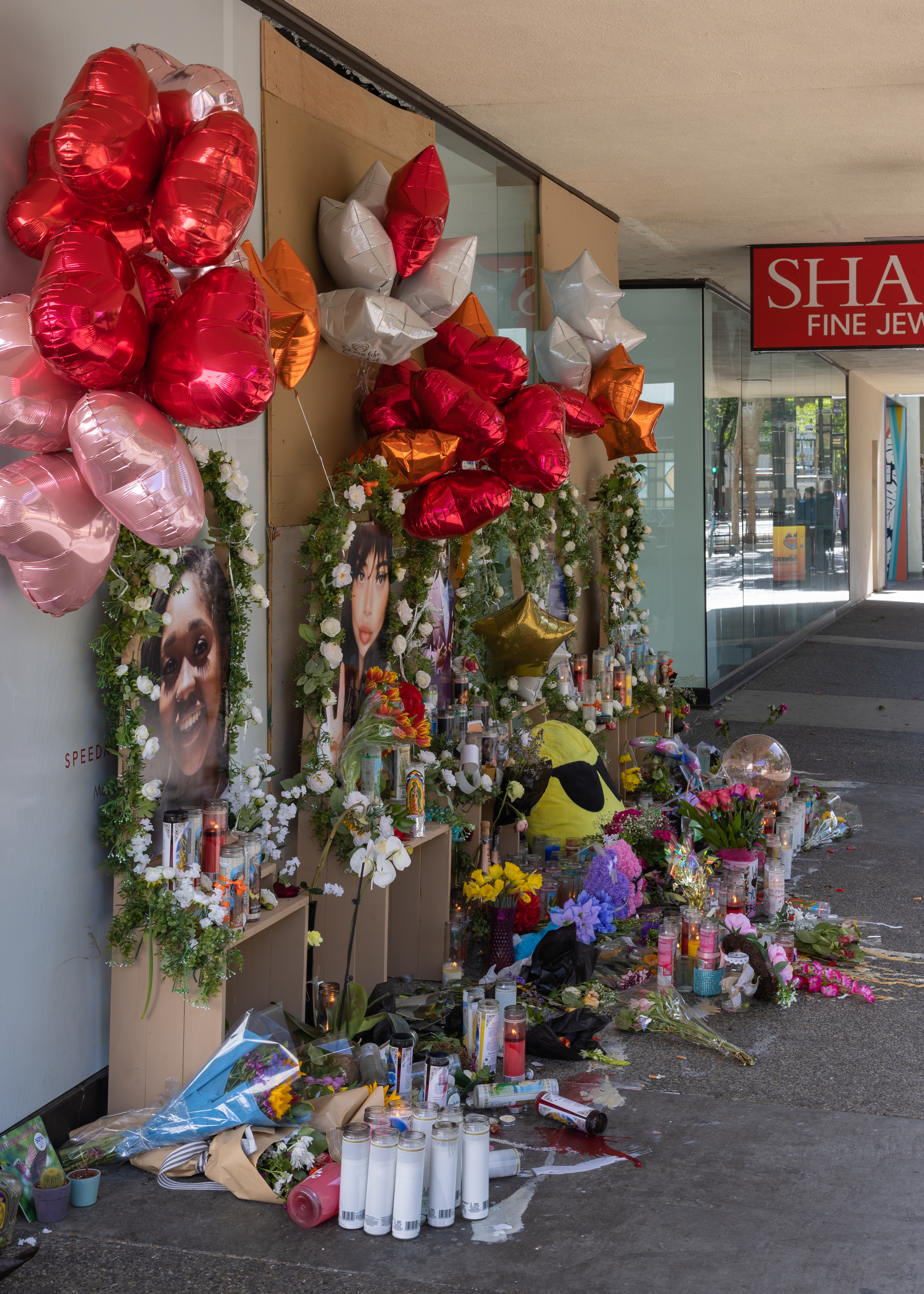
A memorial to the victims of the 2022 Sacramento shooting

In February 2022, in Los Angeles, Skipp Townsend held a peace meeting over brunch with the rivaling Rollin' 60s Crips and Inglewood Family Bloods at a restaurant in Manhattan Beach. This meeting was successful, and as of June 2024, there has not been a homicide caused by warring between the sets since then.

On April 3, 2022, multiple gunmen killed six people and injured 12 in a mass shooting at the intersection of 10th Street and K Street in Sacramento, California. In 2024, Sacramento Police detective Shaun McGovern gave more details on the case while testifying in a trial of three men accused of the shooting, saying that the shooting was related to a conflict between the local Garden Blocc Crips and Del Paso Heights Bloods gangs, among other gangs.

== Belligerent sets ==
Crips
Sets	Locations of warring against Bloods			Ref.
Sets	Cities (metropolitan area)	Subdivision	Country	Ref.
107 Hoover Crips		New Jersey	U.S.	
Carver Park Compton Crips	Los Angeles	California	U.S.	
Garden Blocc Crips	Sacramento	California	U.S.	
Grape Street Watts Crips	Los Angeles	California	U.S.	
Eglinton West Crips	Toronto	Ontario	Canada	
Insane Gangster Crips	Orlando	Florida	U.S.	
Jamestown Crips	Toronto	Ontario	Canada	
PJ Watts Crips	Los Angeles	California	U.S.	
Rollin' 60s Neighborhood Crips	Los Angeles	California	U.S.	
South Side Compton Crips	Los Angeles	California	U.S.	
Rexdale Crips	Toronto	Ontario	Canada	
Rusholme Crips	Manchester	England	U.K.	
Swamp Crips	Los Angeles	California	U.S.	

Bloods
Sets		Locations of warring against Crips			Ref.
Sets		Cities (metropolitan area)	Subdivision	Country	Ref.
Brims	Bloodhound Brims	New York City	New York	U.S.	
Brims	Fruit Town Brims		New Jersey	U.S.	
Bounty Hunter Watts Bloods		Los Angeles	California	U.S.	
Del Paso Heights Bloods		Sacramento	California	U.S.	
Dixon Bloods		Toronto	Ontario	Canada	
Inglewood Bloods		Los Angeles	California	U.S.	
Jungle Bloods		Toronto	Ontario	Canada	
Moss Side Bloods		Manchester	England	U.K.	
Pirus	Campanella Park Piru	Los Angeles	California	U.S.	
Pirus	Hacienda Village Piru	Los Angeles	California	U.S.	
Pirus	Mob Piru	Los Angeles	California	U.S.	
Rollin' 20 Bloods		Los Angeles	California	U.S.	
United Blood Nation		Charlotte	North Carolina	U.S.	
United Blood Nation	Sex Money Murder		New Jersey	U.S.	
Vaughan Road Bloods	M.O.B. Klick	Toronto	Ontario	Canada	

== In popular culture ==
The 1988 film Colors, which follows police officers as they investigate the two gangs as well as a Mexican gang in Los Angeles, gained notoriety for using real gangsters as extras, as well as when a Crip murdered a Blood waiting in line to see the movie in Stockton, California. The war was the subject of a 2008 documentary film Crips and Bloods: Made in America. Movies like Boyz N' the Hood, Menace II Society, and South Central also make reference to Crip and Blood sets.

In 1990, as a show of solidarity amongst the city's gang members, a group of major West Coast rappers released the song "We're All in the Same Gang" under the name West Coast Rap All-Stars. The cover of rapper Kendrick Lamar's 2014 single "i" is a photo of a Crip and Blood holding up their hands to make heart symbols, which Lamar described as the opposite of holding up gang signs. In 2024, he held The Pop Out: Ken & Friends concert in Los Angeles, in which Bloods and Crips celebrated together as a way to demonstrate unity against rapper Drake during the Drake–Kendrick Lamar feud.

In the video games Grand Theft Auto: San Andreas (2004) and Grand Theft Auto V (2013), both set in a fictional version of California named San Andreas, the Crips and Bloods are represented by the "Grove Street Families" and "Ballas" gangs, respectively. San Andreas has a gang warfare gameplay mechanic, where players—acting as Grove Street Family member Carl Johnson—can kill Ballas to take over the city of "Los Santos" in sections.

In the South Park episode Krazy Kripples, characters Jimmy Valmer and Timmy Burch join the Crips when Christopher Reeve visits South Park to promote stem cell research, taking the attention away from Jimmy's comedy act. The duo soon find themselves targeted by the Bloods, which leads them to try to end the war between the two gangs.

== See also ==
- Timeline of the Crips–Bloods gang war
- Gangster Disciples–Black Disciples conflict
- Gangs in Belize
- Gangs in Los Angeles
