= Crips and Bloods: Made in America =

- Directed by: Stacy Peralta
- Written by: Stacy Peralta; Sam George
- Produced by: Shaun Murphy; Baron Davis; Dan Halsted; Stacy Peralta; Jesse Dylan; Gus Roxburgh; Cash Warren
- Narrated by: Forest Whitaker
- Edited by: T.J. Mahar
- Music by: Kamasi Washington
- Release date: 2008
- Running time: 93 minutes
- Country: United States
- Language: English

Crips and Bloods: Made in America is a 2008 documentary by Stacy Peralta that examines the rise of the Crips and Bloods, prominent gangs in America who have been at war with each other. The documentary focuses on the external factors that caused African-American youth to turn to gangs and questions the political and law enforcement response to the rise of gang culture.

== Cast ==
Bo Taylor: He is former Schoolyard Crip and the founder of Unity One, a privately funded organization dedicated to peacemaking and the transformation of gang members into productive citizens.

Skipp, Nikko and Bow Wow: Former Bloods and Crips members that join together as a part of Unity One, working to help active gang members make a better living and make the transformation they need.

Jim Brown: Pro Football Hall of Famer founded of the Amer-I-Can foundation. The mission of the foundation is to help provide life management skills and resources to at-risk youth and has been doing so for more than 20 years.

Rock Johnson: Former original Compton Crip member and currently the National Chief of Staff of the Amer-I-Can foundation. He is also the founder of the I-Can Youth Foundation.

Vicky D. Lindsey: Founder of Project Cry No More, a privately funded organization dedicated to providing therapy to mothers who have lost their children to gang violence.

Minister Tony Muhammad: Wester Regional Minister for the Nation of Islam and founder of Peace Makers, a privately funded program dedicated to resolving gang conflict.

T. Rodgers: Founder of Sidewalk University and author of two books on gang culture (one of them being '1995's - The Uprising and "Do or Die'") Rodger works on bringing armistice to gangs of all color and denominations, nationally and internationally.

Aquil Basheer of Maximum Force Enterprises and Aqeela Sherrils of The Reverence Project, both currently direct an intervention program specializing in the violence abatement, truce negotiation, and youth empowerment.

Terry Goudeau, Naji Harris, and James Harris: Original gang members and now working as community recovery and reconciliation counselors.

Kumasi, Bird, and Ron: Former Slauson gang members and now activist, educators, and community leaders dedicated to forging unity between African Americans and Latinos.

== Film ==
Crips and Bloods: Made in America
- Full documentary on the official Cineverse YouTube channel

The documentary is set in South Central Los Angeles, and the film emphasizes the area's proximity to some of America's wealthiest communities. South Central is five miles from Hollywood and twenty miles from Anaheim and Orange County. The documentary notes that children who grow up to join gangs often face a severe deficit of opportunities and highlights that the American Dream appears out of reach for the youth of South Central. Crips and Bloods: Made in America notes that violence between the two gangs has taken more than 15,000 lives to date.

=== Storyline ===
The documentary begins with a discussion of the circumstances that led to the rise of violent gangs including a lack of youth outlets, a need for in-group protection, and the emergence of the modern drug trade.

==== Organizational neglect ====
The film interviews former gang members who describe being turned away from youth organizations such as the Boy Scouts of America and Explorer Scouts of AmericaExploring (Learning for Life). The interviewees discuss how young African-American men are neglected from predominantly white organizations, and that black youth across South Central often have no place for developing a sense of identity. The interview subjects discuss how this gave gang culture a special appeal, especially among youth who lacked a sense of belonging.

The documentary also notes how gang culture rose from competition between neighborhood cliques, namely groups like the Slausons, Dell Vikings, and the Gladiators. In addition to providing a sense of community for local youth, these groups also fought back against white gangs who routinely caused problems in black neighborhoods. These first organizations offered a newfound unity and sense of safety for young black men that was otherwise out of reach.

==== Los Angeles Police Department ====
Due to the perceived criminality of African-American men, the Los Angeles Police Department under the direction of Police Chief William Parker, regulated the Los Angeles area. Parker believed in a hardline approach to gang violence and resisted using social work to quell the violence. One of the ways he enforced this was through locking down African-American neighborhoods. According to Kumasi, a former Slauson gang member, "You had to be at the right neighborhood at the right time. You couldn't go east of Alameda, for example."

East of Alameda was a predominantly white neighborhood, where African Americans were not welcomed during the high of the Civil Rights Movement. Kumasi further discusses the invisible barriers that were established. If one was found walking through the “wrong neighborhood” they were questioned. This, in essence, limited the freedom to walk wherever one pleased.

Kumasi later described the experience of an African-American man of Los Angeles as a "walking time bomb". They were experiencing so much hatred from the police that sooner or later they would erupt. "The only question was upon whom," he said.

==== Watts riots ====
The documentary then demonstrates how these African-American experiences set the stage for the Watts riots. African Americans were being killed for small crimes. After a police encounter led to the arrest of an intoxicated man, his brother, mother, and other African Americans took to the streets against the Los Angeles Police Department to protest the racial injustices against them. Police Chief William Parker fueled the already racialized tension by calling African Americans "monkeys in a zoo". Newspapers around the country were covering the riots and the documentary discusses the way it was portrayed by the media.

Institutional changes occurred afterward. The documentary discusses the changes made by the Black Panther Organization and the backlash they received. FBI investigations claimed that the "Black panthers were the biggest threat to internal stability of USA". Black Panther leaders were murdered and arrested. After those leaders disappeared, the new generation started: the Crips and Bloods (see background, membership, and history below).

==== California economy ====
California was different from parts of the South. There were no prior bus laws or segregation in public schools. However, there were covenants against black housing and neighborhood segregation. Even after it was outlawed, neighborhoods remained the same.

Industrialization came to Los Angeles in the late 1950s in response to the booming industrialization of the country. The American economy was changing to an economy with either high end or low end jobs. African Americans found themselves displaced in the job market. They did not have the prior skills, knowledge, or education to perform the high wage technological jobs due to the historical discrimination and lack of opportunities.

They also did not feel like they, as US citizens, should have to perform the low labor jobs either. African Americans felt that they were above the immigrant low-level jobs. This resulted in total displacement from the labor market. Eventually, by the latter half of the 1960s, jobs and factories disappeared from the Los Angeles region. The consequences were enormous: businesses were empty with nowhere to turn. It simply became harder and harder to survive.

==== Drug trade ====
After the introduction of crack cocaine, even African-American families were torn apart; family institutions also became dysfunctional. There were no male role models in the family. Seventy percent of black children were born to single mothers. Twenty eight percent of all black men would be incarcerated in their lifetime. The disproportionate number of black men in prison made the possibility of a male figure in an African-American family even less likely.

== Reception ==
The film was a nominee for the award for Outstanding Documentary (Theatrical or Television) at the NAACP Image Awards and the Best Documentary at the Emmys.

== See also ==
- Gangland, the 2007-2010 documentary television series by The History Channel
