= Crenshaw Mafia =

Subgroup of Bloods street gang

- Crenshaw Mafia member with gang apparel
- Founding location: Inglewood, California
- Years active: 1970s–present
- Ethnicity: Primarily African-American
- Activities: Murder; Drug trafficking
- Allies: LA Denver Lane Bloods; Inglewood Family Gang; Athens Park Bloods; Family Swan Bloods
- Rivals: Imperial Village Crips; Rollin 90s Neighborhood Crips; Tongan Crip Gang

The Crenshaw Mafia Gangster Bloods (also known as the Crenshaw Mafia Gang) are a "set" of the Bloods gang alliance founded by Zane Scott. The gang is depicted in several movies, including Boyz n the Hood and Straight Outta Compton.

== History ==
=== Formation ===
There is some disagreement about when the gang formed. According to one source, the gang formed in Inglewood during the 1970s and was named after Crenshaw Boulevard. However, another source claims that the gang was formed in 1981 by members of the Inglewood Family Gang.

=== 1997 injunction against the Crenshaw Mafia ===
On December 17, 1997, the Los Angeles County District Attorney's Office and Los Angeles Sherriff's Office sought an injunction against the Crenshaw Mafia Gangster Bloods, as the gang had been responsible for 19 murders in the preceding four years. In the two years following the implementation of the injunction, the gang committed no murders.

=== Spreading outside of California ===
By the mid-1980s, the Crenshaw Mafia spread to Denver, Colorado. In November 2014, David Scott, a member of the Crenshaw Mafia, killed two Crips in Denver. Scott was sentenced to 30 years in federal prison.

In 2024, two members of an Inglewood Family Gangster Bloods set in Atlanta, Georgia had been arrested for prostituting a minor who also happened to be a missing person.

== Depictions in media ==
- In the 1991 film Boyz n the Hood, a student replies "I ain't from Africa. I'm from Crenshaw Mafia!", after a young Tre explains that humans originated from Africa. 7 years later, when a police officer harasses Tre, he accuses Tre of being a member of the Crenshaw Mafia.
- In the 1993 song "Piru Love" by Bloods & Crips from their album Bangin' on Wax, the Crenshaw Mafia is mentioned.
- In the 2015 film Straight Outta Compton, a Crenshaw Mafia member named OG 2 Tone confronts some students on Ice Cube's school bus, after they display Crip gang signs. He warns "Remember me. OG 2 Tone. Crenshaw Mafia, Blood."
