= Murder of Karen Toshima =

1988 gang murder

Karen Toshima
- Born: Karen Chikako Toshima; September 25, 1960
- Died: January 30, 1988 (aged 27); Los Angeles, California, U.S.
- Cause of death: Gunshot wound
- Occupation: Graphic artist

Durrell Collins
- Born: Durrell DeWitt Collins
- Other name: Baby Rock
- Organization: Rollin' 60s Neighborhood Crips
- Status: On parole
- Convictions: Murder, attempted murder
- Penalty: 27 years to life

On January 30, 1988, 27-year-old graphic artist Karen Chikako Toshima was shot and later died in a hospital after she got caught in the crossfire between two rival gang members in Los Angeles, California. Toshima's death signified the spread of gang violence outside the known gang territories of the Los Angeles area, as the shooting occurred in Westwood Village, a once popular entertainment district.

== Shooting ==
On the night of January 30, 1988, 27-year-old graphic artist Karen Toshima went out for dinner with a friend in Westwood Village, which was the main entertainment center of Los Angeles at the time. As Toshima was walking with her friend along Broxton Avenue, a confrontation occurred between two rival gang members.

On either side of Broxton Avenue, members of two rival gangs had gathered. Tyrone Swain, a member of the Mansfield Hustler Crips, began taunting Durrell DeWitt "Baby Rock" Collins, a member of the Rollin' 60s Neighborhood Crips. Collins said “C’mon, I got something for you” and pulled out a handgun, firing two shots, intending to shoot Swain. However, both shots missed Swain and Toshima was hit in the head by one bullet. Toshima was taken to UCLA Medical Center, where she died 12 hours later.

Based on witness testimonies and photo line-ups, investigators narrowed down their suspects to Collins and a few other members of the Rollin' 60s Neighborhood Crips. Collins was arrested a week after the shooting from his home in South Central Los Angeles.

== Trial ==
While the handgun used in the shooting was recovered by the police, there were no fingerprints on it. As a result, the prosecution had to rely on eyewitness testimonies, as there was little physical evidence linking Collins to the shooting. The key witness was a 16-year-old student who went to Westwood Village to buy a pair of shoes. The student, who was wearing a red sweatsuit, was harassed by Collins, who mistook the student for a member of the Bloods.

During the trial, the student pointed out Collins as the gunman. Regarding the student, Deputy District Attorney Michael Duarte later recalled:

“He remembered Collins pulling out the gun, recalled the scar over his eye. Thank God for that kid. He was the key.”

On October 31, 1989, Collins was found guilty of one count of murder and one count of attempted murder and was sentenced to 27 years to life in prison. The judge also acknowledged that society had failed Collins, stating:

"These young people are no secret to us. They are walking time bombs. We failed the Durrell Collinses of the world. We failed ourselves as a society."

Collins's father did not believe that his son was a gang member and cried after the verdict was announced. On July 7, 2022, Durrell Collins was granted parole.

== Controversy ==
Several critics claimed that Toshima's case received more attention than the murders of African-Americans or Latinos in the predominantly Black South Central region of Los Angeles. One gang worker remarked:

We sympathize with the young woman who got killed. But South-Central has the highest homicide rate. There is nothing in the black and brown neighborhoods to keep kids from getting into gangs, no prevention. Nobody cares about blacks and browns."
