= Hip Hop Uncovered =

American documentary series

- Genre: Documentary
- Directed by: Rashidi Natara Harper
- Starring: Big U; Deb Antney; Bimmy; Trick Trick; Hatian Jack
- Country of origin: United States
- Original language: English
- No. of episodes: 6

Production
- Executive producers: Douglas Banker; Jonathan Chinn; Simon Chinn; Jimmy 'JimBob' Chris; Rashidi Natara Harper; Eugene 'Big U' Henley; BJ Levin; Malcolm Spellman
- Producers: Gioia Bearden; Camara Rose
- Running time: 55-60 minutes
- Production companies: Lightbox; Five all in the Fifth; The 51; FXP

Original release
- Network: FX
- Release: February 12 – February 26, 2021

Hip Hop Uncovered is a six part television docuseries executive produced by Malcolm Spellman, from FX, which premiered in February 12, 2021. The series discusses the connection between hip hop artists and street culture, and those behind the scenes who helped "bridge" them together. The stories are told through the eyes of Big U, Deb Antney, Bimmy, Trick Trick, and Hatian Jack who were considered players in connecting street culture with hip hop.

== Episodes ==
No.	Title	Directed by	Original release date
1	"A Child Is Born With No State of Mind"	Rashidi Natara Harper	February 12, 2021
2	"Cash Rules Everything Around Me"	Rashidi Natara Harper	February 12, 2021
3	"Shit's Real"	Rashidi Natara Harper	February 19, 2021
4	"Things Just Ain't the Same For Gangstas"	Rashidi Natara Harper	February 19, 2021
5	"Industry Rule Number 4080: Record Company People Are Shady"	Rashidi Natara Harper	February 26, 2021
6	"Victory Lap"	Rashidi Natara Harper	February 26, 2021
