= Cameron Terrell =

American gang member (born 2000)

- Born: 2000 (age 25–26)
- Education: Palos Verdes High School
- Alma mater: University of Houston (BA)
- Organization: Rollin' 90s Neighborhood Crips
- Known for: White, affluent member of the Crips gang
- Status: Acquitted
- Criminal charges: Murder of Justin Holmes

Cameron Terrell (born 2000) is an American former member of the Rollin' 90s Neighborhood Crips gang, who was acquitted for his alleged role in the murder of 21-year-old Justin Holmes. Terrell's case received national media attention, as Terrell was white and came from an affluent background, which is unusual among members of the Crips gang.

== Background ==
=== Terrell family ===
Cameron Terrell is the only child of Debra Terrell, an interior designer, and Donald Wayne Terrell, a media executive. The Terrell family lived in Palos Verdes Estates, which was described as the 47th most expensive zip code in the United States by Forbes in 2007. Cameron Terrell attended Palos Verdes High School, where he had good grades.

Terrell was reportedly fascinated by gang culture and at one point purchased a book about gangs.

=== Joining the Rollin' 90s Neighborhood Crips ===
In 2016, Terrell started hanging out in Jesse Owens Park in South Los Angeles, after his parents were having "issues at home." Jesse Owens Park has been described as the "main hangout" of the Rollin 90s Neighborhood Crips, a "set" of the larger Crips gang alliance. At the park, Terrell came into contact with a teenager who would later join the Rollin' 90s Neighborhood Crips. It was through this teenager that Terrell also joined the gang. One resident near Jesse Owens Park was surprised by Terrell's presence in the neighbourhood, thinking "Who is this? What is he doing here?"

After joining the Rollin' 90s Neighborhood Crips, Terrell would give away his clothing to gang members and let them borrow his luxury car. His nickname in the gang was "Milk".

== Shooting ==
=== Shooting of Justin Holmes ===
At 11:26 am, on October 1, 2017, using his father's Mercedes-Benz, Terrell drove two other members of the Rollin 90s Neighborhood Crips to the 7800 block of South Western Avenue, which is the territory of a rival gang, the Eight Tray Gangster Crips. Terrell would later claim that he thought the two other gang members were going to spray graffiti in the territory of their rivals.

As Terrell waited in the car, the two gang members approached 21-year-old Justin Holmes, who was with two friends. Holmes' friends ran away and he was asked about which gang he was from. After Holmes replied that he "doesn't gangbang", one of the gang members shot Holmes. The two gang members ran back to Terrell's car, which sped off. Holmes was taken to a hospital, where he was pronounced dead at 12:02 p.m.

=== Terrell released on bail ===
After being arrested on October 12, Terrell was released on a $5 million bail on October 19 and was allowed to continue attending school while on bail. Terrell's presence at school angered a group of parents, who wrote a letter to the Palos Verdes Peninsula school board, in which they stated:

"At best, Terrell is a distraction to teachers, staff and other students. At worst, most law enforcement officers would say that allowing an 18-year-old gang member suspected of a felony to attend a high school presents a clear and present danger to other students."

In response to this, Terrell was required to complete his studies off campus.

== Trial ==
=== Defense ===
Terrell's trial began on July 3, 2018, and he was represented by Jovan Blacknell. During the trial, 23 witnesses were called to testify. The main focus of the trial was on whether Terrell knew his two fellow gang members were going to murder someone. Blacknell argued that "Cameron didn’t expect to hear gunshots" and at best, Terrell was a "witness".

=== Prosecution ===
The prosecution argued that Terrell knew that they were going into a rival gang's territory to kill members of the rival gang. It was argued that Terrell participated in the murder to gain status within the gang and the jury was presented with images of Terrell posing with known gang members, wearing gang colors and using gang signs.

=== Verdict ===
After a 10-day deliberation, the jury found Terrell not guilty. After the verdict was announced, the family of Justin Holmes shook their heads and walked out of the courtroom. Terrell made a statement to the media:

"I want to say rest in peace, Justin Holmes. He shouldn’t have died that day. I pray for his family every night."

=== Controversy ===
After Terrell was acquitted, critics claimed that his race and affluent background helped him win the case. Richard Kania, a criminal justice professor at Jacksonville State University, stated that Terrell had the privilege of hiring a private defense attorney and that "he just doesn’t fit the image of a gangbanger".
