= Daiyan Henley =

American football player (born 1999)

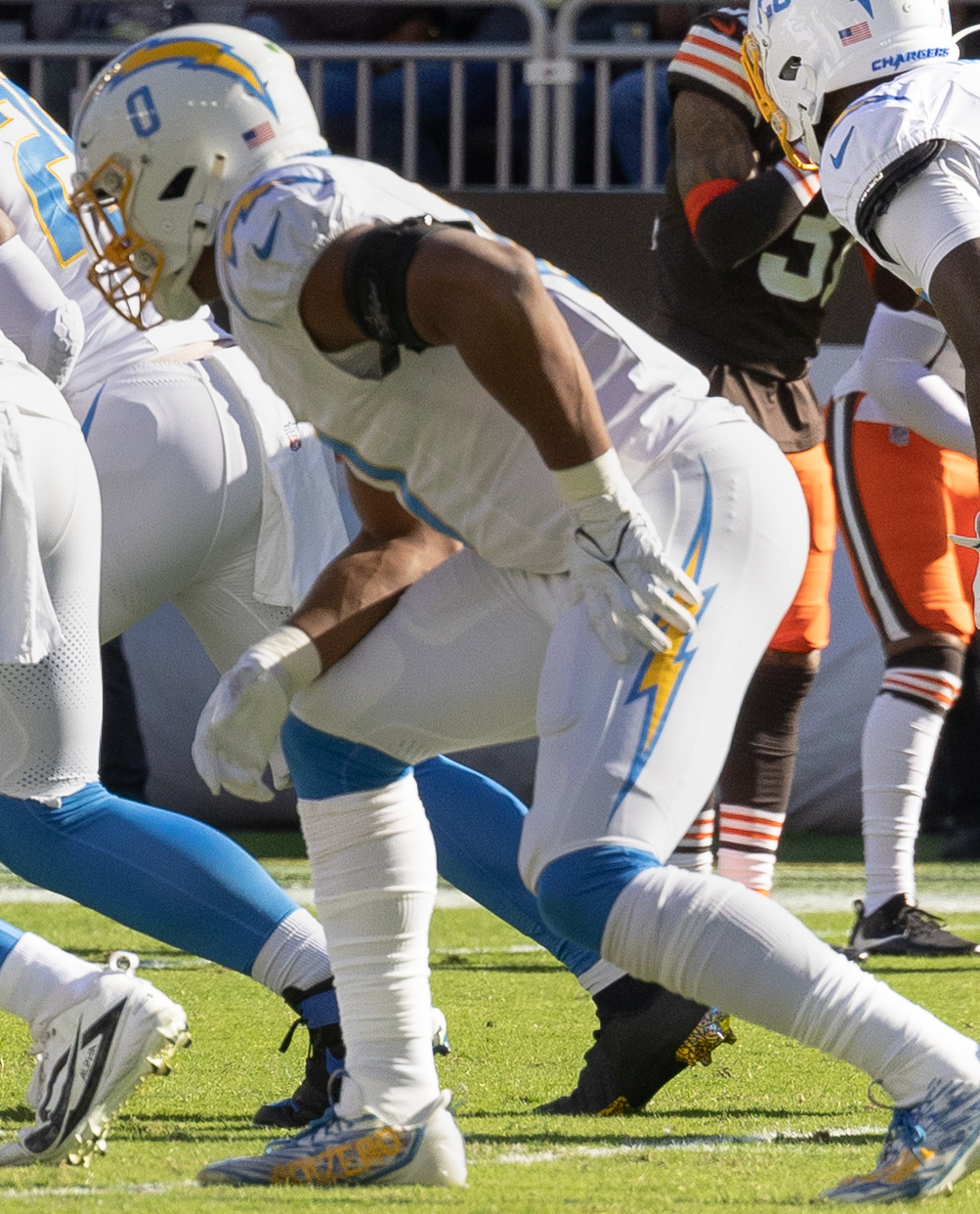
- Henley with the Los Angeles Chargers in 2024

No. 0 – Los Angeles Chargers
- Position: Linebacker
- Roster status: Active

Personal information
- Born: November 18, 1999 (age 27); Los Angeles, California, U.S.
- Listed height: 6 ft 0 in (1.83 m)
- Listed weight: 225 lb (102 kg)

Career information
- High school: Crenshaw (Los Angeles)
- College: Nevada (2017–2021); Washington State (2022)
- NFL draft: 2023: 3rd round, 85th overall pick

Career history
- Los Angeles Chargers (2023–present)

Awards and highlights
- First-team All-Pac-12 (2022); Second-team All-Mountain West (2021)

Career NFL statistics as of Week 9, 2026
- Total tackles: 317
- Sacks: 5.0
- Forced fumbles: 1
- Fumble recoveries: 2
- Pass deflections: 15
- Interceptions: 4
- Stats at Pro Football Reference

Daiyan Henley (born November 18, 1999) is an American professional football linebacker for the Los Angeles Chargers of the National Football League (NFL). He played college football for the Nevada Wolf Pack and Washington State Cougars and was selected by the Chargers in the third round of the 2023 NFL draft.

== Early life ==
Henley was born on November 18, 1999, in Los Angeles, California. He is the son of Eugene (Big U) Henley Jr, alleged leader of the Rolling 60's Neighborhood crips;

Henley later attended Crenshaw High School. He is the cousin of former NFL Los Angeles Rams player Darryl Henley.

== College career ==
Henley began his college career at Nevada, where he played wide receiver for his first two seasons. Henley caught 17 passes for 232 yards and three touchdowns before being moved to defense before the start of his junior season. He suffered a season-ending injury and used a medical redshirt on the year. Henley made 49 tackles as a redshirt junior. In 2021, he made 103 tackles with three tackles for loss and four interceptions and was named second team All-Mountain West Conference. Following the end of the season, Henley entered the NCAA transfer portal.

Henley ultimately transferred to the Washington State Cougars for his final season of NCAA eligibility over offers from USC, Kansas State, and Washington.

== Professional career ==
Pre-draft measurables
Height	Weight	Arm length	Hand span	Wingspan	40-yard dash	10-yard split	20-yard split	Vertical jump	Broad jump	Bench press
6 ft 0 7/8 in (1.85 m)	225 lb (102 kg)	33 in (0.84 m)	9 1/2 in (0.24 m)	6 ft 5 3/4 in (1.97 m)	4.54 s	1.55 s	2.67 s	37.5 in (0.95 m)	10 ft 5 in (3.18 m)	19 reps
All values from NFL Combine/Pro Day

Henley was selected by the Los Angeles Chargers in the third round, 85th overall, of the 2023 NFL draft. As a rookie, he appeared in 15 games and made 16 total tackles (nine solo).

Henley started all 17 games for Los Angeles during the 2024 season, despite suffering a torn labrum partway through the season; he underwent offseason surgery to address to the injury.

On November 10, 2026, a trade was agreed upon to send Henley to the Denver Broncos for a 2027 fourth-round pick and a 2028 fifth-round pick. The next day, the Broncos announced that the trade would not be finalized due to a failed physical and Henley would remain on the Chargers.

== NFL career statistics ==
Legend
**Bold**	Career high

=== Regular season ===
Year	Team	Games		Tackles					Interceptions						Fumbles				
Year	Team	GP	GS	Cmb	Solo	Ast	Sck	TFL	Int	Yds	Avg	Lng	TD	PD	FF	Fum	FR	Yds	TD
2023	LAC	15	0	16	9	7	0.0	0	0	0	0.0	0	0	0	0	0	0	0	0
2024	LAC	17	17	**147**	**84**	**63**	1.0	**7**	1	4	**4.0**	4	0	**8**	0	0	0	0	0
2025	LAC	16	16	103	54	49	**3.5**	5	**2**	**8**	**4.0**	**8**	0	5	0	0	0	0	0
2026	LAC	8	8	51	21	30	0.5	2	1	18	18.0	18	0	2	**1**	0	**2**	0	0
Career		56	41	317	168	149	5.0	14	4	30	7.5	18	0	15	1	0	2	0	0

=== Postseason ===
Year	Team	Games		Tackles					Interceptions						Fumbles				
Year	Team	GP	GS	Cmb	Solo	Ast	Sck	TFL	Int	Yds	Avg	Lng	TD	PD	FF	Fum	FR	Yds	TD
2024	LAC	1	1	10	6	**4**	0.0	0	0	0	0.0	0	0	0	0	0	0	0	0
2025	LAC	1	1	**13**	**9**	**4**	0.0	0	**1**	**2**	**2.0**	**2**	0	**1**	0	0	0	0	0
Career		2	2	23	15	8	0.0	0	1	2	2.0	2	0	1	0	0	0	0	0
