= Kermit Alexander =

American football player (born 1941)

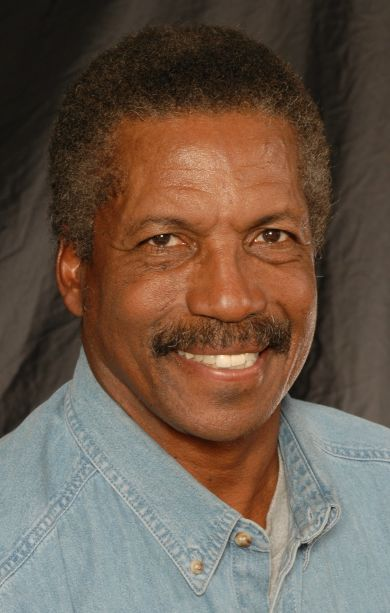

No. 39
- Positions: Cornerback, return specialist

Personal information
- Born: January 4, 1941 (age 85); New Iberia, Louisiana, U.S.
- Listed height: 5 ft 11 in (1.80 m)
- Listed weight: 187 lb (85 kg)

Career information
- High school: Mount Carmel (Los Angeles, California)
- College: UCLA
- NFL draft: 1963: 1st round, 8th overall pick

Career history
- San Francisco 49ers (1963–1969); Los Angeles Rams (1970–1971); Philadelphia Eagles (1972–1973)

Awards and highlights
- Pro Bowl (1968); Second-team All-American (1962); First-team All-PCC (1962)

Career NFL statistics
- Games played: 143
- Starts: 118
- Kickoff returns: 153
- KR yards: 3,586
- Punt returns: 133
- PR yards: 835
- Interceptions: 43
- Touchdowns: 5
- Stats at Pro Football Reference

Kermit Joseph Alexander Jr. (born January 4, 1941) is an American former professional football player who was a cornerback and return specialist in the National Football League (NFL). He was on the board of directors for the Lott IMPACT Trophy, which is named after Pro Football Hall of Fame player Ronnie Lott, and is awarded annually to college football's defensive IMPACT Player of the Year. His life story, including his upbringing, football playing, the murder of his mother and other family members, and adoption of five Haitian children, has been the subject of a book and television documentary.

== Early life ==
Alexander was born on January 4, 1941, in New Iberia, Louisiana. He was the first of eleven children, born to Kermit Sr. and Ebora Alexander. He was raised in Los Angeles, and attended Mount Carmel High School. In 1958, as a senior, he was named to the first-team California Interscholastic Federal (CIF) All Southern California Central Section Football Team.

As a teenager, he took up Police Athletic League (PAL) boxing. Alexander had a fierce temper as a teenager, and gave up boxing as part of a greater effort by him and his parents to control his temper.

Alexander was a Mount Carmel teammate of twin brothers Marlin and Mike McKeever (class of 1957). Marlin McKeever and Alexander would later be NFL teammates in 1971 (Los Angeles Rams) and 1973 (Philadelphia Eagles). In 2012, the Alexander-McKeever Field located on the site of the former Mt. Carmel High School was dedicated in their honor, as part of the Mt. Carmel Recreation Center.

== College career ==
Alexander played varsity football for the UCLA Bruins from 1960-62. He played halfback on offense and also was one of the team's top defensive players. In 1961, he averaged 5.5 yards per carry in 30 rushing attempts and 24.6 yards per catch on eleven receptions, scoring a touchdown both rushing and receiving. The following year, he rushed for 472 yards (5.8 yards per carry), had 178 receiving yards (14.8 yards per catch), and scored five rushing touchdowns and one receiving touchdown. USC coach John McKay called rival Alexander the best college player in the country, when he was coaching Alexander in an East-West College All-Star Game in July 1963 in Buffalo.

Alexander played one season at UCLA with future 49ers defensive backfield teammate Jimmy Johnson.

Alexander ran the 100-yard dash in 9.8 seconds. As a member of UCLA's track and field team, he won the 1962 NCAA Track and Field Championships national title in the triple jump.

In 1986, he was inducted into UCLA's Sports Hall of Fame.

== Professional career ==
=== San Francisco 49ers ===
Alexander was drafted by the San Francisco 49ers with the eighth pick in the first round of the 1963 NFL draft. He was also drafted by the Denver Broncos of the American Football League with the fifth overall pick, but chose to sign with San Francisco. Alexander played for the 49ers from 1963 to 1969. He began his career at left cornerback in 1963, moved to free safety in 1964, played free safety and right cornerback in 1965, and then continued as the 49ers right cornerback through the 1969 season. From 1964-66, and 1968, he was the Rams regular punt and kick returner, leading the league in kickoff returns and return yardage in 1965.

Alexander played alongside Pro Football Hall of Fame cornerback Jimmy Johnson, his former UCLA teammate, who was the 49ers left cornerback from 1964-76. Alexander was selected to play in the Pro Bowl in 1968, after a season in which he had a career-high nine interceptions, including an interception he returned 66 yards for a touchdown.

Alexander was known as a hard-hitting athletic player. In a 1968 game, his hit against Chicago Bears' star running back Gale Sayers would ultimately result in serious damage to Sayers's knee (although with modern arthroscopic techniques the consequences would not have been as severe). While Alexander has described the circumstances and that he was not trying to injure Sayers, he has been villainized by some over it. Sayers' coach George Halas, one of the NFL's founders, was furious at the time. However, when Halas gave Sayers' Pro Football Hall of Fame induction speech nine years later, he said "I will never forget the afternoon of the first injury which resulted by a clean tackle by Kermit Alexander of the 49ers. When Kermit came to the dressing room and said how sorry he was that it happened, that showed what a great man he was."

=== Rams and Eagles ===
Alexander in 1964.

In January 1970, the 49ers traded Alexander and a second round draft pick to the Los Angeles Rams for placekicker Bruce Gossett. In his two years with the Rams, Alexander started every game; the first year at right cornerback and the second year at strong safety. He intercepted a total of seven passes during that time, returning two for touchdowns. In his second year with the Rams in 1971, he returned one of his three interceptions 82 yards for a touchdown against Washington, on a Billy Kilmer pass. He had another interception the following week against the Pittsburgh Steelers in the final game of the 1971 regular season, which would be the last of his career. He played two more seasons with the Philadelphia Eagles in 1972 and 1973, but did not start on defense either year, and did not have any interceptions.

In addition to playing defense, Alexander returned punts and kickoffs for all three teams. Both of his career punt returns for touchdowns came with San Francisco. He ended his 11-year career with 43 interceptions, 668 interception return yards, and three interception touchdown returns. He returned 133 punts for 835 yards and two touchdowns, including a 70-yard return; and 153 kickoffs for 3,586 yards.

=== National Football League Players Association ===
In 1970, Alexander became the Rams' player representation to the National Football League Players Association (NFLPA). From 1971-77 he served on the NFLPA's executive committee; serving as president in 1975. He was one of three players to participate in both collective bargaining agreement (CBA) negotiations with the NFL in 1970-71 and 1974–77, helping to negotiate the final CBA settlement in 1977, even though he had retired. In 1976, he was also the named plaintiff in an NFLPA class action lawsuit against the NFL that resulted in a $13 million settlement.

During the 1974 players strike, Alexander filed charges against the NFL in the National Labor Relations Board (NLRB). After two years, a judge found that Alexander and two other players had been victims of discrimination, awarding them reinstatement and back pay. He also was one of the fifteen plaintiffs in Mackey v. National Football League in which Judge Earl R. Larson declared that the Rozelle rule was a violation of antitrust laws on December 30, 1975.

== Personal life ==
During the off season of his playing career, Alexander served as a probation officer in San Francisco.

On August 31, 1984, Alexander's mother, sister and two nephews, ages 8 and 13, were murdered in South Central Los Angeles during a home invasion by members of the Rollin 60's Neighborhood Crips, whose intended victims lived two doors away. After the murders, Alexander fell into decades of despair, breaking up his marriage and family. The teen convicted of killing his family was Tiequon Cox, whom Alexander had watched playing Pop Warner football when Cox was eight years old. Cox's temper was so out of control that Alexander said publicly during the child's game that someone needed to intervene in his life, but by junior high school Cox was in a gang.

Alexander later married Tami Alexander, who did charity work, including traveling to the Mission of Home orphanage in Haiti. On a trip with her to Haiti, they decided to adopt a young boy, Clifton. The Alexanders were initially planning on adopting one child, but after meeting the child's four siblings, they ended up adopting all five. In reflecting on whether to adopt all five children, Alexander thought of his own mother raising 11 children, and how she often said, "'There's nothing worse than an empty house.'" During the adoption process the five children remained in Haiti, and survived hurricanes and an earthquake in 2010, and now live with the Alexanders in the U.S.

Alexander has co-written a book with two criminal justice professors about his upbringing, the tragic death of his mother, sister and nephews, the adoption of the five children, and his journey from despair to a renewed hope and sense of purpose, The Valley of the Shadow of Death: A Tale of Tragedy and Redemption. Alexander's life story was featured on the ESPN program, Outside the Lines.

In 2014, Alexander filed a lawsuit against the California Department of Corrections and Rehabilitation (CDCR) to have Cox, who had been sentenced to death in 1986 but remained incarcerated on death row, executed. The CDCR reached a settlement in June 2015 by issuing new rules regarding lethal injection.
