= 2022 Sacramento shooting =

Mass shooting in California, U.S.

- Part of the Crips–Bloods gang war
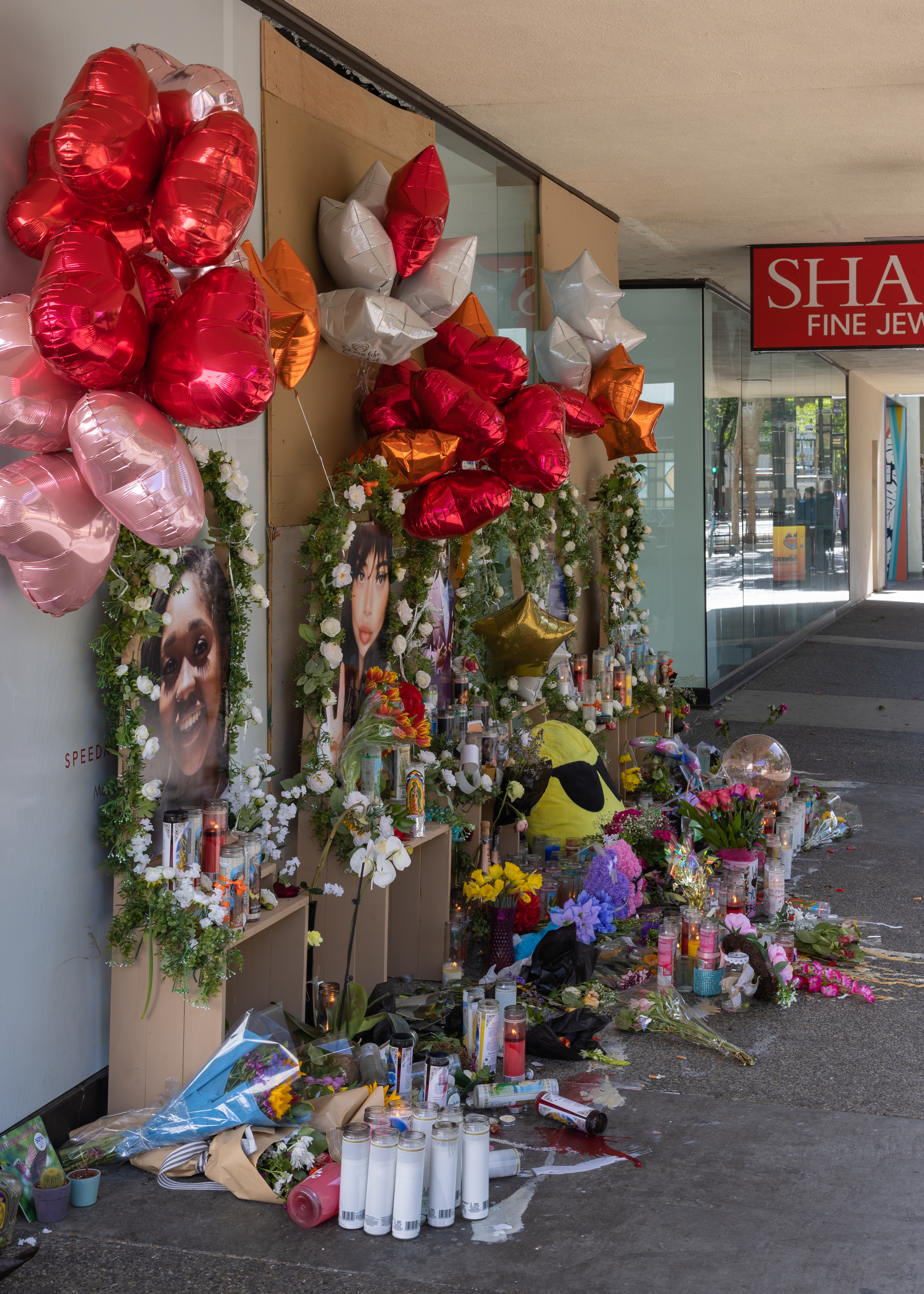

- 2022 Sacramento shooting (Sacramento, California) The location of the shooting
- Location: 38.57921°N 121.49395°W; Area of 10th Street and K Street; Downtown Sacramento, California, U.S.
- Date: April 3, 2022 c. 2:00 a.m. (PDT)
- Attack type: Mass shooting, gang violence
- Weapons: Handguns, Glock 19 (modified with Glock switch)
- Deaths: 6 (including one of the perpetrators)
- Injuries: 12 (including at least one of the suspects)
- Perpetrators: DeVazia Turner; Smiley Martin
- Motive: Feud between Crips and Bloods gangs
- Accused: Dandrae Martin; Mtula Payton
- Charges: First-degree murder (3 counts); Illegal possession of firearms; Possession of a machine gun

On April 3, 2022, at approximately 2:00 a.m., a mass shooting occurred in downtown Sacramento, California, United States. Six people were killed and twelve others were injured. The Sacramento Bee described it as the "worst mass shooting in Sacramento's history". Five shooters are suspected to be involved in the incident.

== Events ==
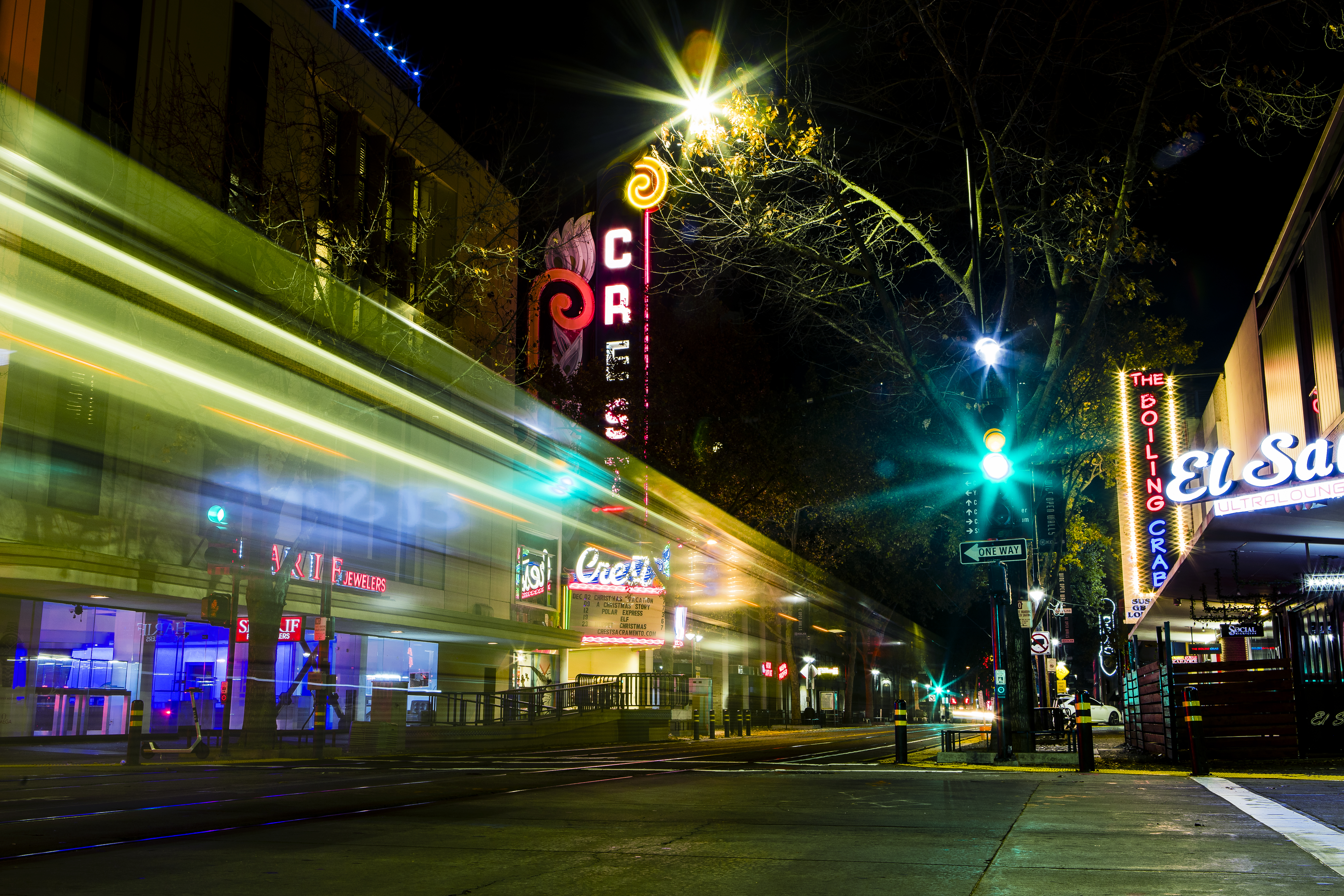
The shooting occurred near the intersection of 10th and K Streets, pictured here in 2021

The shooting occurred at around 2:00 a.m. in the area of 10th Street and K Street, just blocks away from the California State Capitol and the Golden 1 Center. One suspect continued shooting as he ran north on 10th Street towards J Street. Police officers nearby heard the gunshots and immediately responded.

The shooting caused damage to at least three buildings and three vehicles. On Twitter, a video was circulated showing people running down the street and rapid gunfire being heard in the background. In another Twitter video, a large group of people can be seen surrounding two people fighting when gunfire breaks out behind them.

According to Sacramento Police Department chief Kathy Lester, it was initially unclear if the shooting was connected to a particular venue or event. She also said there was a fight immediately prior to the shooting. Lester said that there were multiple shooters, whom the police are seeking.

== Victims ==
There were six fatalities in the shooting: three men and three women. A 38-year-old man was the first dead person whose identity was released, on the night of the shooting. The other victims were identified by the Sacramento County Coroners Office early the next morning, with the dead ranging in age between 21 and 57 years-old.

Another 12 people suffered from varying degrees of injury:

- Four were taken to the trauma unit at UC Davis Medical Center.
- Five were taken to Sutter Medical Center.
- Another two people injured in the shooting walked into Sutter around 2:55 a.m. and a third injured victim was transported to Sutter by ambulance.

On the same day as the shooting, the five treated overnight at Sutter were discharged, and, the following day, two of the four treated at UC Davis were discharged.

== Investigation ==
Immediately after the shooting, police closed the area bounded by 9th, 13th, L, and J Streets, and called for the public to avoid the area.

The police later appealed to the public for help in identifying the people involved in the shooting. The ATF was called in to assist the Sacramento Police Department in the investigation. Police recovered two handguns from the scene, one stolen, and confirmed there were multiple shooters. The streets were reopened the day after the shooting. Police recovered 114 spent cartridges at the crime scene, and identified several buildings and vehicles that were hit with bullets.

On April 4, three suspects were apprehended throughout the day:

- Dandrae Stephan Martin (born June 7, 1995), a 26-year-old male, was arrested just after midnight for suspicion of assault, possession of a handgun that was found at the scene, and possession of a firearm by a prohibited person. On Saturday night, prior to the shooting, Dandrae streamed himself on Facebook Live brandishing a handgun. He was scheduled to appear in the Sacramento Superior Court on April 5. He was described as a "related suspect" by police, who also had searched three residences in the area, finding the handguns. The police were still seeking multiple suspects after the arrest, saying that "this individual has not been arrested for any homicide related to this incident".
- Smiley Allen Martin (born July 9, 1994), a 27-year-old brother of Dandrae, was the second suspect arrested. Both Dandrae and Smiley were residents of Phoenix, Arizona, and both had an Arizona criminal history dating back to 2013 and 2014. In 2018, Smiley was sentenced to 10 years in prison for domestic violence but was released in February 2022. Both Martin brothers had been injured in the shooting. He was later charged with possession of a machine gun as a Glock 19 handgun with a device that allows full auto fire was discovered at the scene and the investigation found that it was fired during the shooting.
- Daviyonne Dawson, a 31-year-old man, was also arrested. Police recovered a gun with Dawson's arrest, but due to the firearm type, it is not believed the gun was used in the shooting. He was subsequently released the following day after posting $500,000 bail. He was seen carrying a gun after the shooting, but is not charged with being involved in the shooting.

On April 6, police said they believe that at least five shooters were involved. While police did not have a precise motive for the shooting, they considered it gang-related: "it is increasingly clear that gang violence is at the center of this tragedy. While we cannot at this time elaborate on the precise gang affiliation of individuals involved, gangs and gang violence are inseparable from the events that drove these shootings." According to law enforcement, one side in the shooting had ties to the Crips gang while the other side had ties to the rival Bloods gang. Gang violence had been a problem in Sacramento for several years prior to the shooting, with a spate of shootings in 2017 leading the city council to funnel millions of dollars in funding to prevent neighborhood violence.

On April 12, a fourth suspect was identified, 27-year-old Mtula Tashamby Payton (born May 20, 1994), a resident from Las Vegas, Nevada. Police indicated that Payton was involved in the shooting, and called on the public to provide information on his whereabouts.

According to April 16 court documents, three of those killed were involved in a gang dispute, and at least one of them fired a weapon.

On May 3, Smiley Martin, Dandrae Martin, and Payton were charged with murder for the deaths of Johantaya Alexander, Melinda Davis and Yamile Martinez-Andrade. They were not charged with murder for the deaths of three other people because those people were believed to be involved in the gunfight that led to the deaths of the bystanders. Payton was arrested in Las Vegas on May 28.

Smiley Martin died in jail on June 8, 2024. His autopsy report says that he died of an accidental drug overdose.

Dandrae Martin and Mtula Payton went to trial in July 21, 2026 but the jury deadlocked and a mistrial was declared.

== Reactions ==
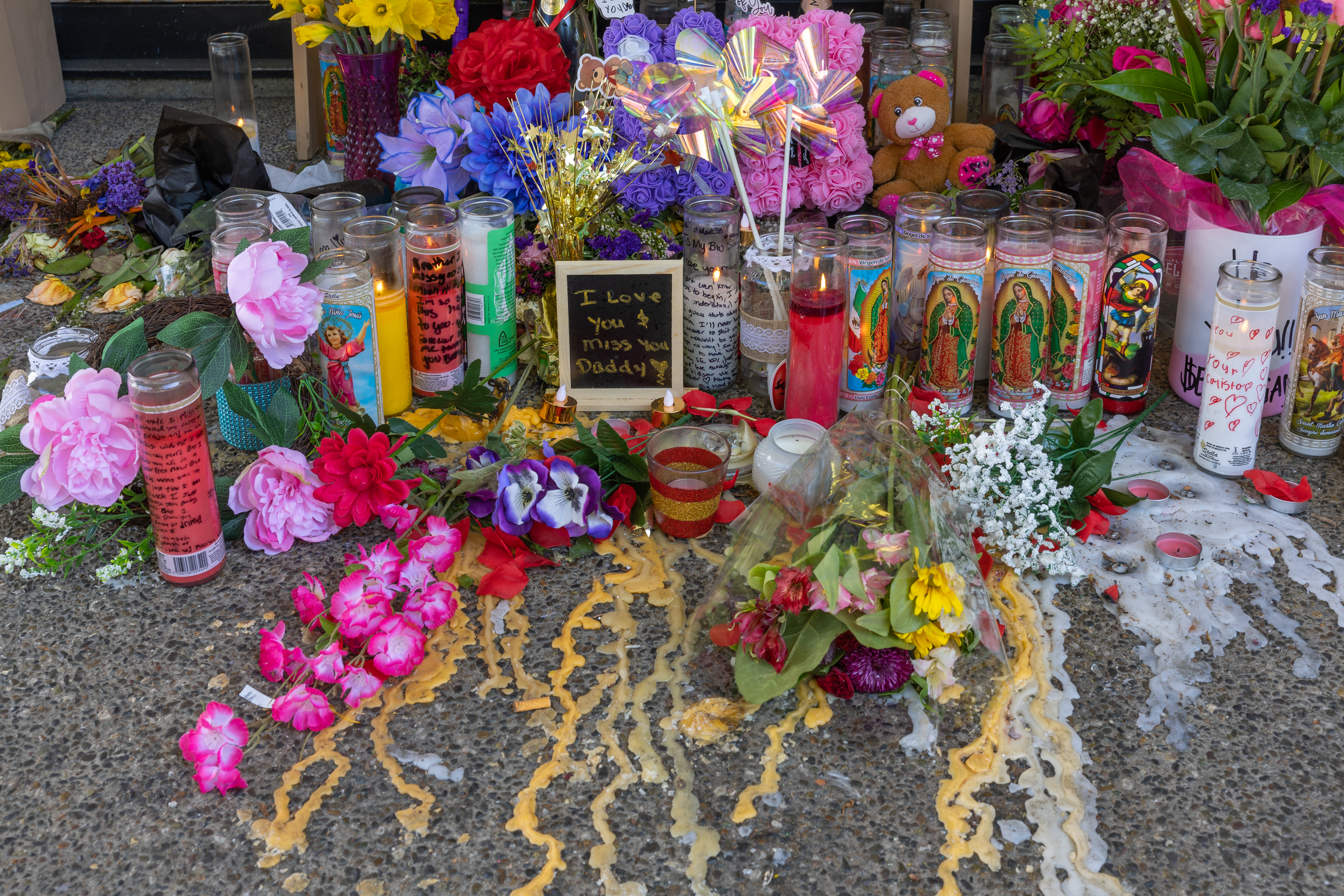
The site of the shooting on the corner of K street and 10th on April 9, 2022

President Joe Biden called on the United States Congress to work on new gun control measures. He proposed a requirement of checking people's background for gun purchases and a ban of privately made firearms, assault weapons and high-capacity magazines. Most of these were already enforced in California and the state has the strictest gun control laws out of any U.S. state.

California Governor Gavin Newsom condemned the shooting and called for stricter gun laws, tweeting, "We cannot continue to let gun violence be the new normal."

Michael Ault, executive director of Downtown Sacramento Partnership, said that the city is in the process of reinforcing public safety by adding lights and security cameras and implementing laws. Mayor Darrell Steinberg said the city has invested $8.1 million to provide better lighting and security.

On the night of the shooting, a candlelight vigil was held at Cesar Chavez Plaza on 10th Street, where people prayed and called for peace. Another vigil was held on the evening of April 4. Sacramento community members brought candles, balloons and flowers to the streets closed by the police.

An NBA game played later that day in the Golden 1 Center between the Sacramento Kings and the Golden State Warriors started with a moment of silence for the victims. Pop group Aly & AJ and their touring group offered their sympathy for the victims and first responders; the group had been performing at the Crest Theatre, and their tour bus had been caught in the crossfire of the shooting, with no injuries reported from their group.

== See also ==
- List of homicides in California
