= Debate over the origins of the Crips gang =

Historical argument on the foundation of American gang Crips

Despite becoming one of the largest gangs in the United States, the origins of the Crips gang is disputed, as different sources provide incompatible explanations about the origins of the group. There are disagreements regarding the year the gang was founded, the motivation for forming the gang, how the gang was named and who the cofounders were.

== Motivation for forming the gang ==
=== Stanley "Tookie" Williams' account ===
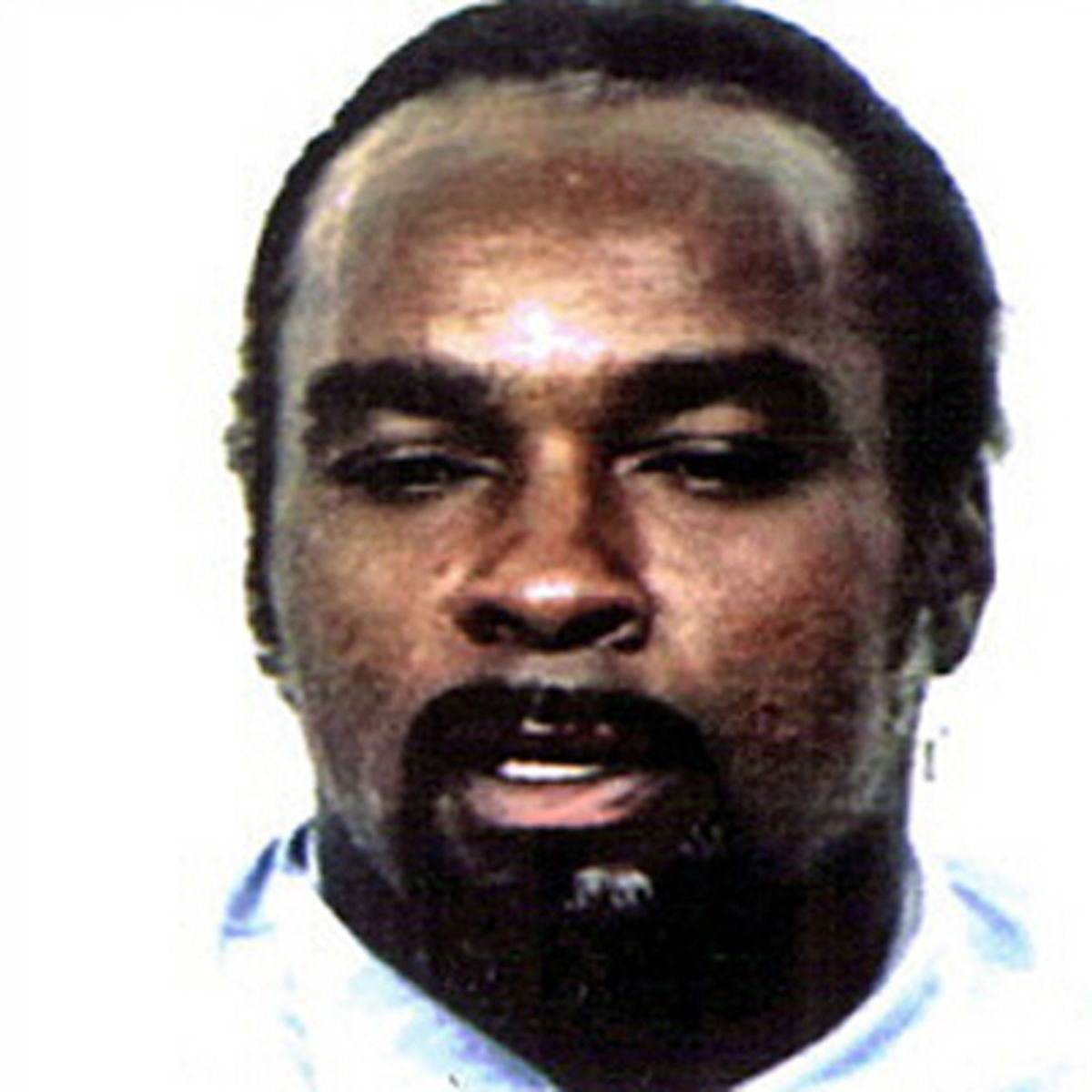
In his book Blue Rage, Black Redemption, Stanley Williams claims that he cofounded the Crips with Raymond Washington in 1971, in order to protect themselves from neighborhood gangs.

In his memoir Blue Rage, Black Redemption, Crips cofounder Stanley Tookie Williams claims that the gang was formed in 1971, after Raymond Washington approached him in George Washington High School, in Los Angeles. Williams and his friends were frequently getting into fights with several local gangs, such as the Sportsman Park Boys. Due to these fights, Williams felt the need to protect himself and his friends, stating:

"My thoughts focused on countermeasures to conquer neighboring gang menaces. No longer would my friends, relatives or I be subjected to fear of bodily harm."

Williams claimed that when Washington approached him in 1971, Washington and his friends were also experiencing the same problem with gangs in the east side of Los Angeles. Washington asked Williams if he was interested in uniting with him, in order to defend themselves from neighborhood gangs. During his meeting, Williams made it clear that he hated gangs. Furthermore, Washington claimed that he wasn't a member of any gang. Williams suggested that they should meet again at the Rio Theatre. During this second meeting at the Rio Theatre, Williams and Washington agreed to form an alliance, as described by Williams:

"I had a sense that something new was beginning here, an alliance that would exceed our imaginations ... Our alliance would begin the urban cleansing of the gang element – or so we thought."

=== Derard Barton's account ===
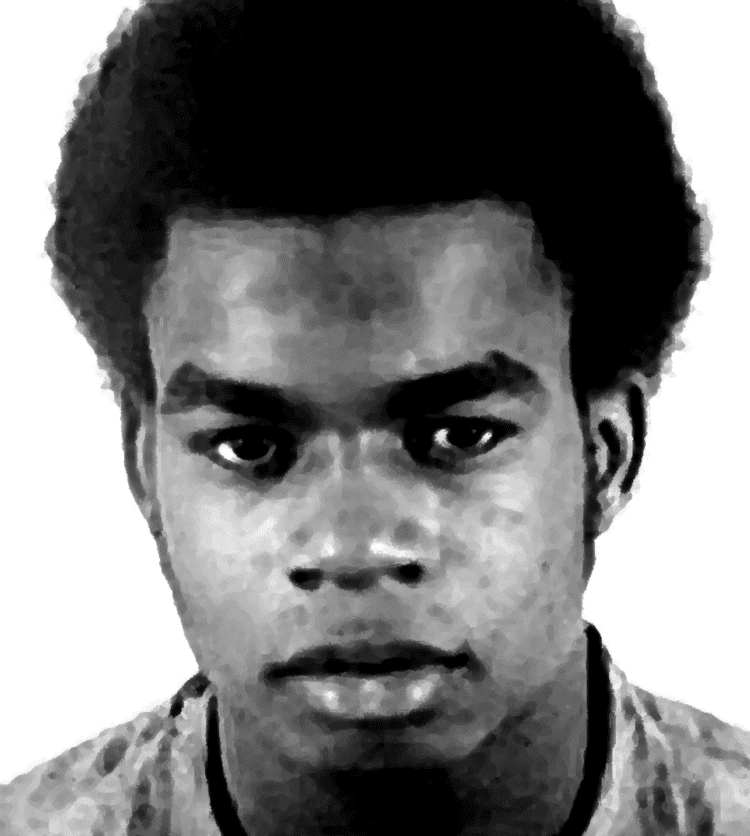
In I Am Raymond Washington (2014) it is claimed that Washington formed the Crips after leaving the Avenues gang in 1969.

While Washington never wrote a memoir like Williams, a biography of Washington titled I Am Raymond Washington was published in 2014 by Zach Fortier, a retired police officer. The book has been described as the only authorised biography of Washington, as Fortier interviewed friends and relatives of Washington to obtain information about the origins of the Crips. Fortier interviewed the half-brother of Raymond Washington, Derard Barton, who outlined his understanding of Washington's motives for forming the Crips.

In the interview, Barton described their brother Reggie, who was a popular musician at Fremont High School. In 1969, Reggie was voted the homecoming king, while the homecoming queen was the girlfriend of Craig Monson. Monson led the Avenues gang, which Washington was a member of. During the homecoming, Monson was jealous of Reggie, so he threatened him with a gun. This angered Washington's brother Ronald Joe, who attacked Monson, while Washington attacked Monson's younger brother. After this incident, Washington left the Avenues, saying "Fuck the Avenues. I'm gonna start my own gang". Fortier considers this account of events plausible.

== Naming the gang ==
=== Stanley "Tookie" Williams' account ===
In Blue Rage, Black Redemption, Williams describes a "great debate" which took place in the school lunch area of George Washington High School, where members of the new alliance discussed possible names for their new group. Williams claimed he didn't care what the name was, as long as it had the word "Tookie" in front of it. Names which were suggested included the Black Crusaders, the Terminators, the Mau-Maus, the Eliminators, the Rebels, and the Black Knights. During this meeting, Raymond Washington suggested Cribs.

The following day, a second meeting was held, where the options were narrowed down to three names, which included the Black Overlords, the Assassins, and the Cribs. A vote was held, and the Cribs was the most popular name. When Williams suggested adding "Tookie" in front of the name, the other members of the group warned that the police would hold Williams accountable for everything the group did, if "Tookie" was included in the group's name.

Williams provided the following explanation as to how Cribs became Crips, stating "Most of us, while intoxicated, mispronounced Cribs as Crips and it stuck."

=== Derard Barton's account ===
Barton claimed that "No matter what you read and no matter what others who are in the gang or in the neighborhood have told you, no one knows where Raymond came up with the name except family members and only immediate family members."

Barton claims that in 1969, he witnessed a conversation between Raymond Washington and Washington's best friend Craig, where the pair were deciding the name of their new gang. During this conversation, Raymond was wearing the shoes of his brother Reggie, whose nickname was "Crip", which was written on the side of the shoe. According to Barton, this was the source of the gang's name.

In both accounts, the word "Crip" is not an acronym for anything, as would be suggested by several sources. For example, "Crip" has often been described as an acronym for "Community Revolution In Progress", "Community Resources for Independent People" or even "Communist Revolution In Progress". However, these suggestions have been refuted by the explanations provided by both Stanley Williams and Raymond Washington's half-brother Derard Barton.

== Cofounders of the gang ==
In Blue Rage, Black Redemption, Williams describes himself and Washington as the cofounders of the Crips. However, this claim is questioned by Zach Fortier in I Am Raymond Washington, where he outlines several points which contradict Williams' claims:

- Based on several interviews, Fortier has concluded that the Crips formed in 1969, which contradicts Williams' claim that the gang was formed in 1971.
- Fortier considers Raymond Washington and Washington's friend Craig as the cofounders of the Crips, based on Derard Barton's description of the conversation he witnessed between the pair.

However, Fortier acknowledges Williams as an "original member", rather than a cofounder.
