= Rollin' 60s Neighborhood Crips =

African-American street gang

Rollin 60s Neighborhood Crips
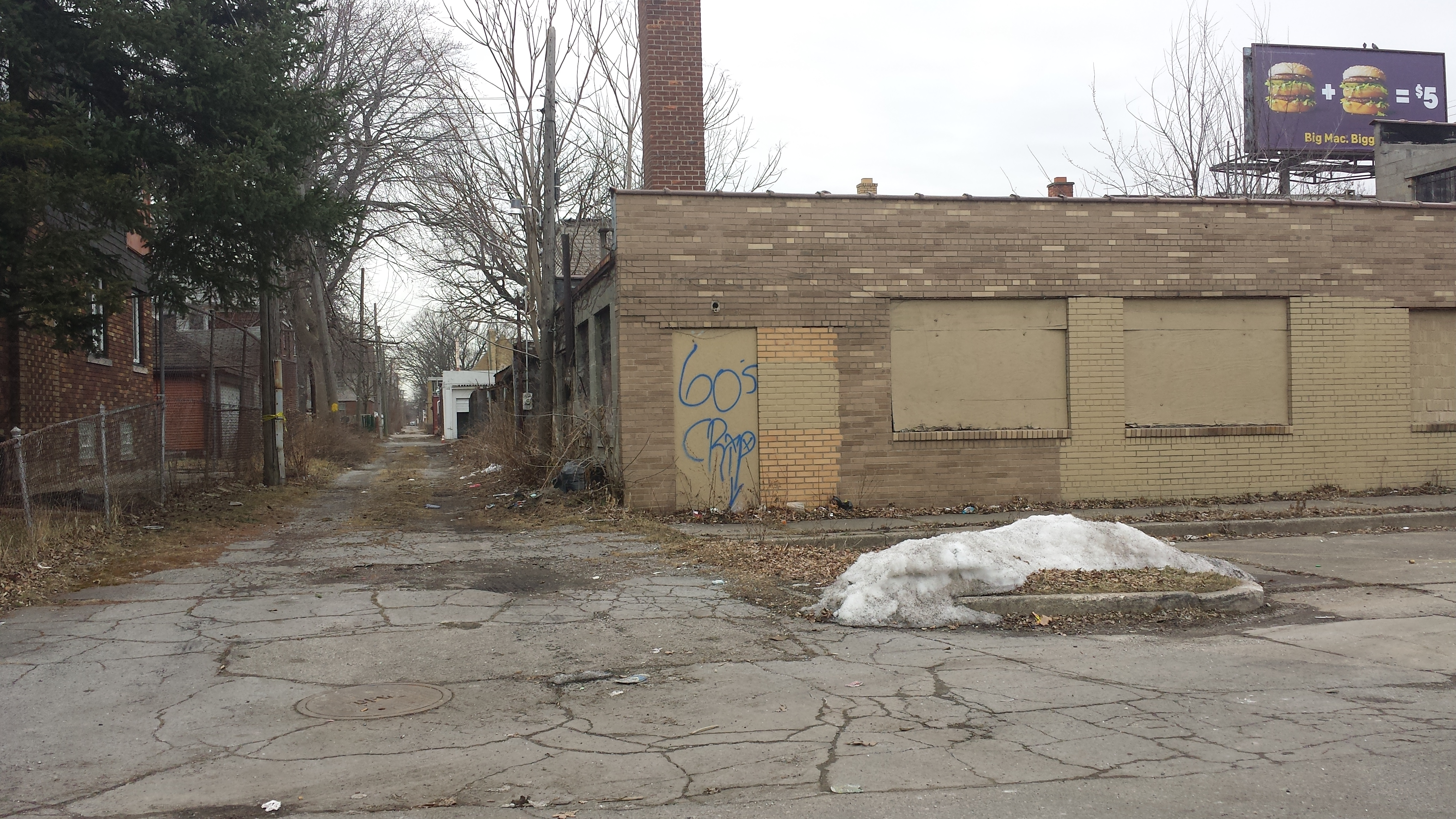
- "60's Crips" graffiti in Detroit
- Founded: 1976
- Founding location: Los Angeles, California
- Years active: 1976–present
- Ethnicity: Predominantly African-American
- Membership (est.): 1,600
- Criminal activities: Racketeering, murder, drug trafficking, arms trafficking, auto theft, armed robbery, burglary, extortion, fraud
- Allies: Rollin 40's and Rollin 90's NHCs
- Rivals: Bloods, "Hoover factions", "Eight Trey Gangster Crip (83GC)"

The Rollin' 60s Neighborhood Crips is a "set" of the Crips street gang alliance based in Los Angeles, California, originally formed around Hyde Park, Los Angeles, in 1976 by Baron Dacosta and having since spread to other cities in the United States. Membership is estimated to be around 1,600 people, making it one of the largest gangs in the Los Angeles area.

Members identify themselves by wearing the Seattle Mariners or Chicago White Sox logos and mark areas they are in with graffiti.

== History ==
The Rollin' 60s Neighborhood Crips were among the first Crip sets to emerge in Los Angeles, and are named after the West 60th Street, which runs through its territory between Slauson and Florence Avenues. The Crips, as well as the Rollin' 60s, spread to other cities across the country in the 1980s as part of the crack epidemic.

In 1992, Crips' Kingpin Keith "Stone" Thomas was killed. Around 400 people, including law enforcement, attended his funeral which prompted many to reflect on the bloodshed and actions of Rollin' 60s. Youth worker and activist Chilton Alphonse reflected on the change marked by Stone's death:

Once upon a time, the Rollin' 60s were a family. Now, I think a lot of these youngsters are beginning to question, is it really worth it.

According to a news outlet in 2004, the Rollin' 60s were "the largest black criminal street gang in the City of Los Angeles" and in 2007 were considered a top gang in Los Angeles by the LAPD.

== Investigations and prosecutions ==
Two men identified as members of the Rollin' 60s were arrested for the 1984 murders of four members of professional football player Kermit Alexander's family. Police say the gang members got the address wrong and killed the wrong family.

In 1988, a member of the Rollin' 60s was responsible for the death of Karen Toshima, who was caught in the crossfire between two gang members in Westwood Village. Her death led to a large crackdown on gangs initiated by then-LAPD chief Daryl Gates in which hundreds of people were arrested.

In 2013, an East Orange, New Jersey drug network overseen by the Rollin' 60s and other Crips sets was dismantled, leading to 23 arrests, and seizure of $300,000 worth of drugs.

In 2018, the Roosevelt, Long Island set of the Rollin' 60s was dismantled after dozens of members were arrested in 2014 and 2018, and multiple members cooperated with law enforcement. This set had been established in 2003 and was responsible for dozens of shootings over the years as part of a feud with the Roosevelt Bloods gang.

In 2016, a dozen members of the Detroit branch of the Rollin' 60s were arrested and indicted on assault, robbery, carjacking, and drug and firearms trafficking charges. The Detroit set was started around 2006 and in 2016 had 150 members.

In 2023, 19 members of the Savannah, Georgia branch of the Rollin' 60s, including rapper Quando Rondo, were arrested on 49 counts of drug charges and gang affiliation.

In 2025, 19 members of the Los Angeles Rollin' 60s were arrested and charged with racketeering, extortion, human trafficking, fraud, and murder. Those arrested include music executive Eugene "Big U" Henley Jr., who authorities said acted as the gang's leader while posing as a community activist. Henley is accused of kidnapping and killing a rival rapper and leaving his body in the Las Vegas desert, among other crimes.

== Notable members ==
- Tiequon "Lil Fee" Cox was a known member of the gang who murdered multiple members of football player Kermit Alexander's family, and was sentenced to death in 1984.
- Rapper, businessman, and community activist Nipsey Hussle was a member of the Rollin' 60s Neighborhood Crips, and was killed by a fellow member of the gang.
- Rapper Kurupt is considered an affiliate.
- Dallas rapper Lil Loaded stated in an interview that he was an affiliate.
- Georgia rapper Quando Rondo is also a member of the Savannah branch of the Rollin' 60s Neighborhood Crips and in June 2023 was arrested for having an alleged leadership role in the gang.
- Music executive Eugene "Big U" Henley Jr. and father of Chargers linebacker Daiyan Henley was arrested in December 1991. He was a member before he was caught in a drug sting and sentenced to 23 years in prison. He founded the non-profit Developing Options Inc. after being released in 2004. Some gang experts described him as the leader and "top man" of the Rollin' 60s, and he has been interviewed about the history of the set. The Los Angeles Times describes Henley as an O.G. or "original gangster" of the Rollin' 60s. He has discussed being a founding member of the set in interviews, and additionally is on wiretap calls describing himself as being a bigger member than any other Rollin' 60s member. Henley was arrested in March 2025 amid accusations that he ran a "mafia-like" organization as a leader of the Rollin' 60s.
