= Sin City Deciples Motorcycle Club =

Outlaw motorcycle club

Sin City Deciples MC
- Abbreviation: SCDMC, 1934 Express, Sin City Nation
- Founded: 1967; 59 years ago
- Founded at: Gary, Indiana, United States
- Type: Outlaw motorcycle club
- Region served: Chapters in 43 U.S. states

The Sin City Deciples Motorcycle Club, also known as Sin City Nation, is a mixed race one-percenter motorcycle club. They are one of the best-known and oldest black outlaw motorcycle clubs in the United States, with multiple chapters across the nation and have an additional presence in Canada, Europe, Asia, Australia, and South America. Additionally, the organization has many support clubs in across the U.S. in select states.

== Background ==
The Sin City Deciples Motorcycle Club was founded in Gary, Indiana in 1967. Only later did the club establish a chapter in Las Vegas, NV, commonly known as "Sin City". Members of the group have described the organization as a "one percenter" club.

Though primarily composed of black men, the club affirms that it is, in fact, open to men of all races and ethnicities.

The Sin City Deciples have chapters in the following American states: Alabama, Ohio, Colorado, Michigan, Illinois, Indiana, Virginia, Tennessee, Nevada, Georgia, Kentucky, Wisconsin, Arizona, Pennsylvania, Missouri, South Carolina, Florida.

The popular motto, "death before dishonor", is utilized by the group as well as the phrase "Deciples Forever, Forever Deciples" – abbreviated as DFFD. Additionally, the Sin City Deciples make use of the term "1934 Express" used to signify the numerical initials of the group (19th letter of the alphabet = S, 3rd letter of the alphabet = C, and 4th letter of the alphabet = D). Members of the Motorcycle Club refer to each of their clubhouses as "Sity Hall".

The club is reportedly allied with the Dahuru MC and Mixbreed MC. Some of the group's support clubs include the Street Misfitz MC, Black Angels MC, So Solid Ryders MC, Ridin’ Like We Stole It MC, and Chauns MC. While historically the Sin City Deciples has required that all members own and ride Harley Davidson motorcycles, riders of metric bikes, including sport bikes, are able to join the Deciple's sibling club, the Sin City Titans. The Sin City Deciples are rivals with the Wheels of Soul Motorcycle Club.

== Criminal allegations and incidents ==
The revenue of the Sin City Deciples reportedly comes from the sale of illicit drugs and they are regarded as a criminal organization by law enforcement.

The earliest documented instance of the group's run-in with the law dates back to July 1968 when a pair of Sin City Deciples members were arrested and charged with raping a white woman in Gary, Indiana. The arrests subsequently sparked racial tensions and resulted in local riots that led to lootings. In response, curfew laws were put into effect and hundreds of police in addition to 550 members of the National Guard were deployed with the intent of suppressing the conflict. The riots went on for days and ended with the arrest of 123 African Americans who were charged with resisting arrest. An additional 47 individuals were charged with curfew violations.

On January 11, 2009, a Sin City Deciples member by the name of Charlie Joe "Coyote" Wilson Jr. gunned down 33-year-old Charles Edward "Big Charlie" Bevelle Jr. in an execution-style shooting. The murder, which took place on an interstate road in Birmingham, Alabama, stemmed from a gang conflict as Bevelle had been the president of a rival biker gang to the Sin City Deciples, Sho' Nuff.

Three Sin City Deciples were stopped by authorities while they were riding in a car en route to the Annual Bikers Roundup in Hampton, Georgia, on August 6, 2006. The vehicle was searched where drugs and weapons were uncovered. The driver, Ernest Jackson, were arrested for speeding and theft while passenger Melvin Bartcher was charged with drug possession and theft. The third passenger, Vernon "Bobcat" Rogers, was also charged with theft and received harsher theft charges on account of being a convicted felon.

Following an FBI investigation, four members of the belonging to the Cleveland, Ohio chapter of the Sin City Deciples were indicted on check fraud charges: Vincent “Gutta” Butler, George “Geo” Hannet, Darnell “Lyfe” Milton and Deonte “Smoke” Sullins. The individuals had allegedly purchased 25 vehicles and two stereo systems with phony checks from sellers on various online marketplaces such as Craigslist. After buying many of the automobiles, they were resold and/or stripped down for parts. Some of these vehicles were found at the group's old clubhouse in Cleveland.

On June 7 of 2011, an unidentified biker was spotted throwing a flammable item through the window of the group's Pittsburgh, Pennsylvania clubhouse before departing from the scene on a Honda motorcycle.

An individual named Virgil Means attended a party at the Sin City Deciples Colorado Springs chapter clubhouse on March 2, 2011. He ended up being beaten and forcibly thrown out of the premises after a brawl erupted on the compound. He later returned by car with a friend to collect his wallet but was attacked by three Sin City Deciples: Christopher Mountjoy, John Burrell and Eric Bartholomew. He later died in the hospital after sustaining a gunshot wound. Five individuals were arrested for their involvement in the homicide.

The Sin City Deciples clubhouse in Pittsburgh was torched yet again on June 26 of 2012.

In Dayton, Ohio, an unidentified member of the Sin City Deciples in Cincinnati attacked a member of the Toro's Motorcycle Club on March 10 of the year 2013. According to the victim, Dylon Lauderdale, he had run into a group of Sin City Deciples and both parties exchanged words until one of the bikers used a machete on him. The assault yielded significant bleeding and a fractured skull for Lauderdale, requiring multiple stitches. The assailant remains unidentified.

A road rage conflict occurred between a car driver and an intoxicated Sin City Deciples member James L. Norman in August 18 of 2014 on Highway 41 in Milwaukee, Wisconsin. After believing that the car had cut him off, Norman sped up to the vehicle's side and fired a gunshot through the front window. He was arrested shortly after the incident and charged with attempted homicide, possession of a firearm by a felon and drunken driving. The victim only sustained minor injuries.

In March 2017, Richard Byrd was sentenced to a short term in prison for the murder of Dion Nixon. He, along with Rufus Billups, Gregory Clark, another unidentified male and three unidentified females, went to the home of Nixon in response to a female, who belonged to the club as property not as a member, had stated being abused by Nixon. Nixon was the first to open fire on the group. Clark pleaded guilty to reckless manslaughter and Billups to possession of a firearm.

In October 2021, 15 members of Sin City in Gary, Indiana, faced a superseding indictment for racketeering and conspiracy. The charges included accusations of violence, drug trafficking, and even solicitation of murder. The operation involved multiple law enforcement agencies spanning Northwest Indiana, Chicago, and Pittsburgh.

== In the media ==
The Sin City Deciples are the subject of a 2019 documentary on Amazon Prime Video entitled Sin City Deciples. They are also featured on another Amazon Prime Video documentary by the name of Ride Free or Die, also released in 2019. The Los Angeles chapter of Sim City Deciples was featured in the 2006 film Crank.
