= Big U =

American music manager and alleged gang leader (born 1966)

Eugene "Big U" Henley Jr.
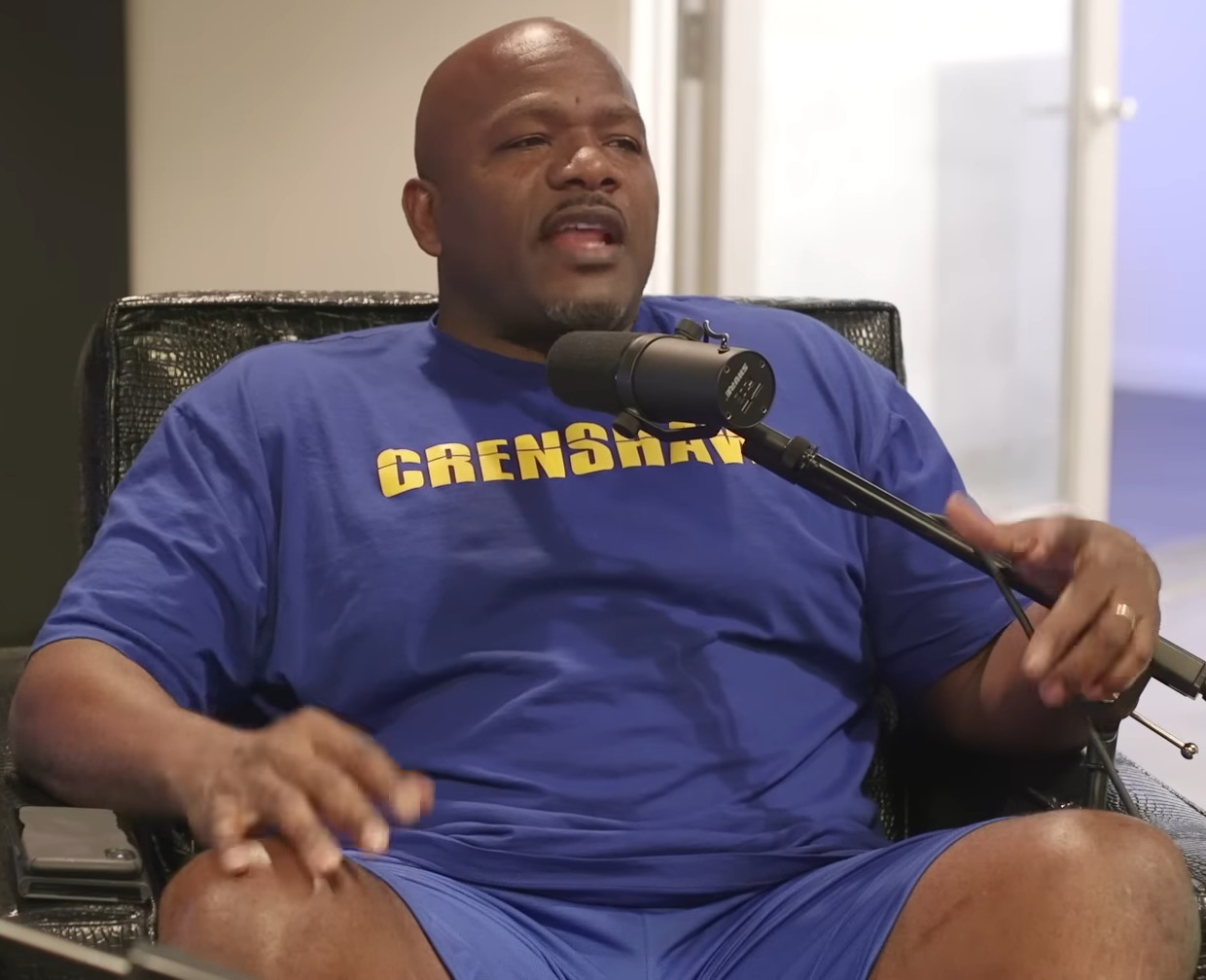
- Big U in 2020
- Born: Eugene Henley Jr. 1966 (age 59–60)
- Occupations: music manager, CEO, Alleged Gang Leader
- Children: 4, including Daiyan

Eugene Henley Jr. (born 1966) known professionally as Big U, is a music manager, CEO of "Big U Enterprises", and alleged leader of the Rolling 60's Neighborhood Crips. He has managed the rappers Kurupt and Nipsey Hussle.

== Career ==
Eugene "Big U" Henley Jr., is the alleged leader of the rolling 60's Los Angeles "Crips" street gang. After serving 13 years in prison for a robbery gone bad in 1991 Henley resurfaced, and assumed the role of a music manager, and community activist. Henley first became a part of the Hip Hop music industry by managing Dogg Pound rapper Kurupt. Henley is noted as a key figure in the rise of Los Angeles rapper Nipsey Hussle's career. His ties in the music industry was further developed with the assistance of Death Row Records co-founder Suge Knight. Henley also became known for the practice called "Checkin In" which is, when a Hip Hop artist, musician or high profile individual from out of town visits a city and meets with the local street gang representative. They would then pay this person a "tax' or "fee" to be able to move around the city without the fear of being met with violence or conflict.

On October 31, 2025, Henley's son, Jabari "Baby Uiie", was shot and killed outside of a smoke shop in South Los Angeles.

== Legal Issues ==
In April 2025, a federal grand jury returned a 43 count indictment against Henley. Federal authorities have compared his Big U Enterprises to a mafia like criminal organization. Charges brought against Henley include fraud, robbery, extortion, tax evasion, embezzlement and attempted murder. Authorities claim he used his influence with his street gang to intimidate business owners and the citizens of Los Angeles. Henley deceived celebrities such as Shaquille O'Neal, Draymond Green and other donors into believing his Big U Enterprises was helping young athletes to achieve their dreams. He also led them to believe his organization was helping to curb gang violence. In reality Henley was amassing the funds for his own financial gain. According to authorities Henley also received federal grants for his charity, which were also diverted to fund his criminal enterprise.

Henley remains in Federal custody.
