= Darren Taylor =

American gang member (1966–2008)

Darren "Bo" Taylor (January 20, 1966 – August 11, 2008) was an American gang member who helped negotiate a truce following the 1992 Los Angeles riots.

Taylor was born in Memphis, Tennessee, and moved to Los Angeles, California, five years later. He joined the Crips at age 14. After graduating from Los Angeles High School and being honorably discharged after four years in the United States Navy, he drifted back into gang life before having an awakening. He founded a gang violence prevention program called Unity One and counseled inmates at the Los Angeles County Jail.

Taylor died of cancer in San Diego, California.
