= Tiequon Cox =

American mass murderer on death row

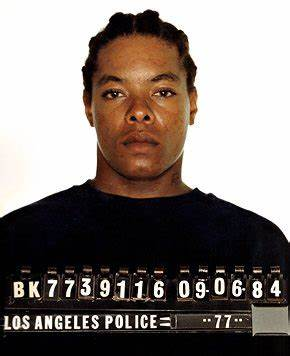
- Cox in a 1984 police mugshot
- Born: Tiequon Aundray Cox; December 1, 1965 (age 60); Los Angeles, California, U.S.
- Other name: Lil Fee
- Status: Incarcerated at California State Prison, Sacramento
- Conviction: First degree murder with special circumstances (4 counts)
- Penalty: Death

Tiequon Aundray "Lil Fee" Cox (born December 1, 1965) is an American criminal and mass murderer who was sentenced to death for the August 31, 1984, murders of various family members of the NFL football player Kermit Alexander. Cox is currently incarcerated in San Quentin State Prison.

Cox was one of the prime suspects of a mass murder investigation into the deaths of Ebora Alexander, aged 59, Dietra Alexander, aged 25, and two boys Damon Bonner, aged 6, and Damani Garner-Alexander, aged 12. They were relatives of the former NFL defensive back Kermit Alexander. Cox was also a member of the Rollin 60 Neighborhood Crips, and on parole on an unrelated charge.

== Murders and possible motives ==
The events of August 31, 1984, are not clear, but what is known is that two suspects, described as being male, were seen bursting into the house of Ebora Alexander (the mother of Kermit Alexander) and opening fire, killing four people in the process. Two other family members who had previously been hiding managed to scare off the shooters, who were seen fleeing in a brown or maroon van. Later, the two suspects were caught and identified as Tiequon Cox, aged 18, and a man Horace Edwin Burns, aged 20. Both were known affiliates of the Rollin' 60s. However, Burns was not one of the gunmen, but a lookout, along with two women, Lisa Brown and Ida Moore, who drove the getaway vehicle. Darren Charles Williams was later caught and identified as the other gunman.

The intended victims actually lived in a house two doors down.

In 1986, he was found guilty of four counts of first-degree murder under premeditation laws in the state of California. The jury further determined that he should be sentenced to death, placing him on death row. Since there is a moratorium on the death penalty in California, he has since been transferred to California State Prison, Sacramento.

== Prison crimes ==
Tiequon Cox stabbed Stanley Tookie Williams in 1988 while on death row. This is depicted in the 2004 TV film Redemption: The Stan Tookie Williams Story.

On July 18, 2000, Cox was one of three inmates who almost escaped from San Quentin. The three rushed towards a hole that had been unraveled from a four-foot section of a chain-link fence, nearly escaping with the intent of taking hostages. Officers subdued all three inmates and took them into a controlled yard. The escape attempt prompted officials to address security problems plaguing San Quentin for years. The other inmates who tried to escape were Paul Tuilaepa and Noel Jackson.
