= Crips =

Street gang from Los Angeles, California

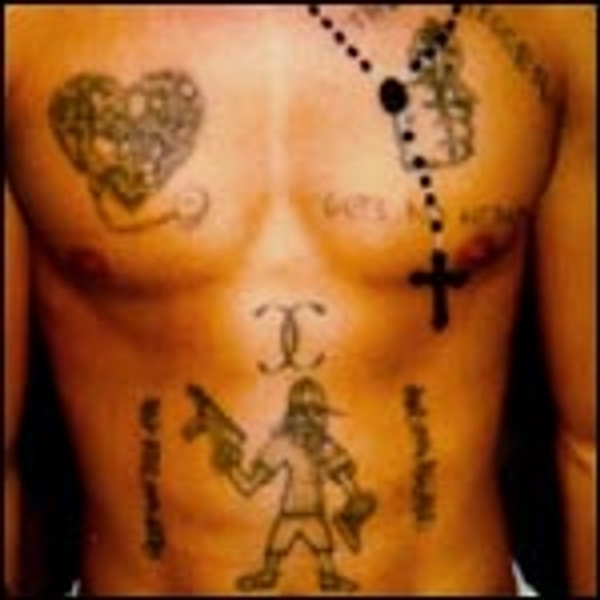
- Tattooed Crip
- Founded: ~1969–1971
- Founders: Raymond Washington; Stanley Williams
- Founding location: Los Angeles, California, United States
- Years active: ~1969/1970s–present
- Territory: 41 U.S. states, Canada and Belize
- Ethnicity: Predominantly African American
- Membership (est.): 30,000–35,000
- Activities: Drug trafficking, murder, assault, auto theft, burglary, extortion, fraud, robbery
- Allies: American Mafia; Black Guerrilla Family; Black Power; CIA; Folk Nation; Gangster Disciples; Juggalos; Sin City Deciples MC; Tiny Rascal Gang
- Rivals: Aryan Brotherhood; Bloods; Florencia 13; Latin Kings; People Nation; Playboys; Santa Monica 13; Tiny Rascal Gang; United Blood Nation; Venice 13
- Notable members: Orlando Anderson; Tiequon Cox; Duane Davis; Kelly Jamerson; Kody Scott; Colton Simpson; Darren Taylor; Cameron Terrell

The Crips are a primarily African-American alliance of street gangs that are based in the coastal regions of Southern California. Founded in Los Angeles, California, in 1969, mainly by Raymond Washington and Stanley Williams, the Crips began as an alliance between two autonomous gangs, and developed into a loosely connected network of individual "sets", often engaged in open warfare with one another. Its members have traditionally worn blue clothing since around 1973.

The Crips are one of the largest and most violent associations of street gangs in the United States. With an estimated 30,000 to 35,000 members in 2008, the gangs' members have been involved in murders, robberies, and drug dealing, among other crimes. They have a long and bitter rivalry with the Bloods.

Some self-identified Crips have been convicted of federal racketeering.

== Etymology ==
Some sources suggest that the original name for the alliance, "Cribs", was narrowed down from a list of many options and chosen unanimously from three final choices, over the Black Overlords and the Assassins. Cribs was chosen to reflect the young age of the majority of the gang members. The name evolved into "Crips" when gang members began carrying around canes to display their "pimp" status. People in the neighborhood then began calling them cripples, or "Crips" for short. In February 1972 the Los Angeles Times used the term.

Another source suggests "Crips" may have evolved from "Cripplers", a 1970s street gang in Watts, of which Washington was a member. The name had no political, organizational, cryptic, or acronymic meaning, though some have suggested it stands for "Common Revolution In Progress", a backronym. According to the film Bastards of the Party, directed by a former member of the Bloods, the name represented "Community Revolutionary Interparty Service" or "Community Reform Interparty Service".

== History ==
Gang activity in South Central Los Angeles has its roots in a variety of factors dating to the 1950s, including: post-World War II economic decline leading to joblessness and poverty; racial segregation of young African American men, who were excluded from organizations such as the Boy Scouts, leading to the formation of black "street clubs"; and the waning of black nationalist organizations such as the Black Panther Party and the Black Power Movement.

Stanley Tookie Williams met Raymond Lee Washington in 1969, and the two decided to unite their local gang members from the west and east sides of South Central Los Angeles in order to battle neighboring street gangs. Most of the members were 17 years old. Williams however appears to discount the sometimes-cited founding date of 1969 in his memoir, Blue Rage, Black Redemption.

In his memoir, Williams also refuted claims that the group was a spin-off of the Black Panther Party or formed for a community agenda, writing that it "depicted a fighting alliance against street gangs—nothing more, nothing less." Washington, who attended Fremont High School, was the leader of the East Side Crips, and Williams, who attended Washington High School, led the West Side Crips.

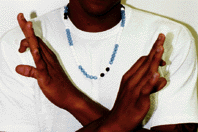
A Crip gang signal

Williams recalled that a blue bandana was first worn by Crips founding member Curtis "Buddha" Morrow, as a part of his color-coordinated clothing of blue Levis, a blue shirt, and dark blue suspenders. A blue bandana was worn in tribute to Morrow after he was shot and killed on February 23, 1973. The color then became associated with Crips.

By 1978, there were 45 Crip gangs, called sets, in Los Angeles. They were heavily involved in the production of PCP, marijuana and amphetamines. On March 11, 1979, Williams, a member of the Westside Crips, was arrested for four murders and on August 9, 1979, Washington was gunned down. Washington had been against Crip infighting and after his death several Crip sets started fighting against each other. The Crips' leadership was dismantled, prompting a deadly gang war between the Rollin' 60 Neighborhood Crips and Eight Tray Gangster Crips that led nearby Crip sets to choose sides and align themselves with either the Neighborhood Crips or the Gangster Crips, waging large-scale war in South Central and other cities. The East Coast Crips (from East Los Angeles) and the Hoover Crips directly severed their alliance after Washington's death. By 1980, the Crips were in turmoil, warring with the Bloods and against each other.

=== Nicaraguan Revolution, Contras, and increased drug trafficking ===
After the Nicaraguan Revolution in 1979, many of the former government people of Anastasio Somoza Debayle fled to the U.S. and were supported by the CIA to counter the communists. Enrique Bermúdez was allegedly picked by the CIA to head the contras, who met with Oscar Danilo Blandón and Norwin Meneses to discuss fundraising. They decided to use drug trafficking to raise funds, and targeted black communities in South Los Angeles.

The gang's growth and influence increased significantly in the early 1980s when crack cocaine boomed and Crip sets began distributing the drug. Large profits induced many Crips to establish new markets in other cities and states. As a result, Crips membership grew steadily and the street gang was one of the nation's largest by the late 1980s. In 1999, there were at least 600 Crip sets with more than 30,000 members transporting drugs in the United States.

== Membership ==
As of 2015, the Crips gang consists of between approximately 30,000 and 35,000 members and 800 sets, active in 221 cities and 41 U.S. states. The states with the highest estimated number of Crip sets are California, Texas, Oklahoma, and Missouri. Members typically consist of young African American men, but can be white, Hispanic, Asian, and Pacific Islander. The gang also began to establish a presence in Canada in the early 1990s; Crip sets are active in the Canadian cities of Montreal and Toronto.

In 1992, the LAPD estimated 15,742 Crips in 108 sets; other source estimates were 30,000 to 35,000 in 600 sets in California.

Crips have served in the United States armed forces and on military bases in the United States and abroad.

== Practices ==
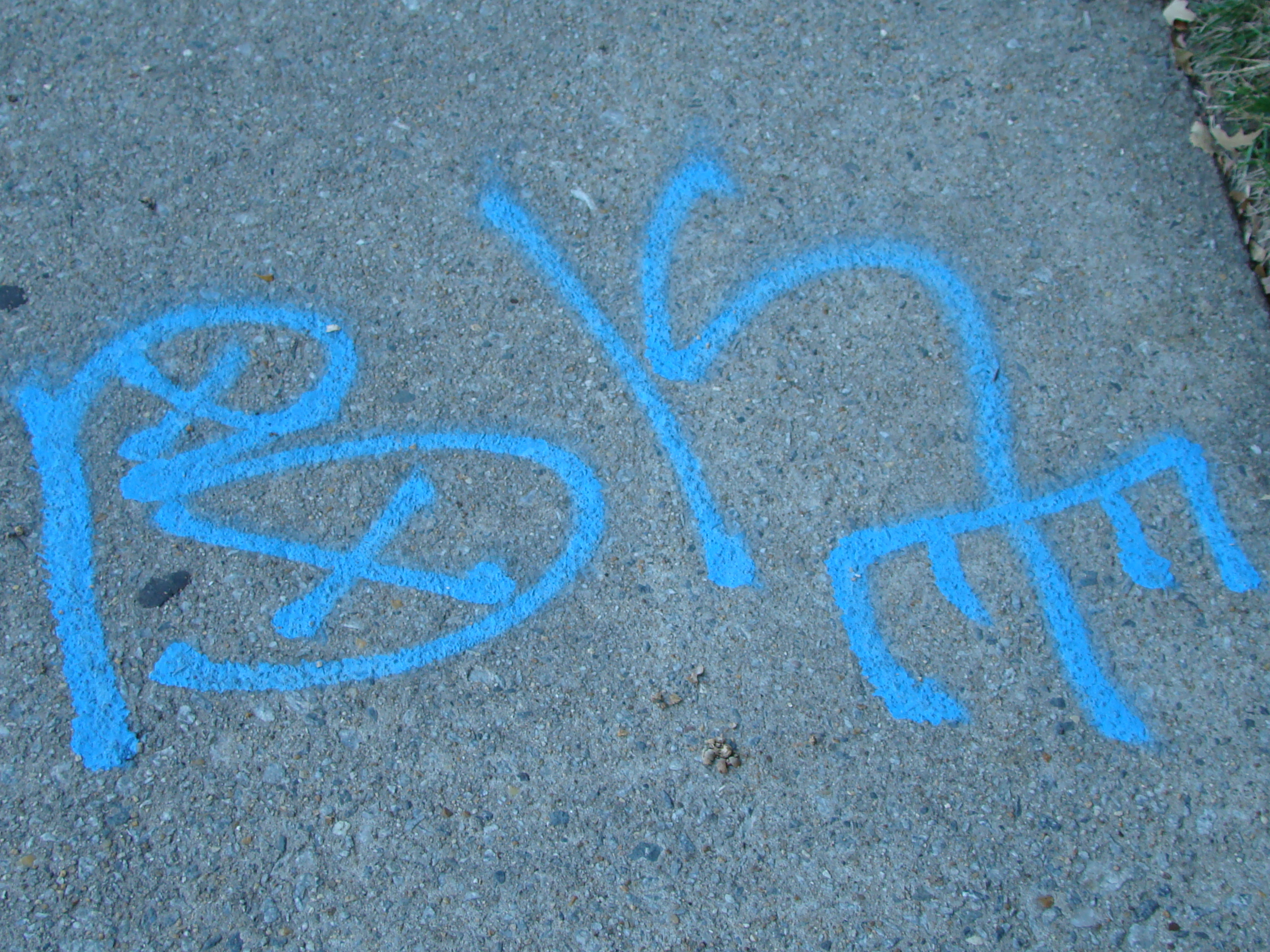
"BK" ("blood killer") graffiti, Alexandria, Virginia

=== Language ===
Some practices of Crip gang life include graffiti and substitutions and deletions of particular letters of the alphabet. The letter "b" in the word "blood" is "disrespected" among certain Crip sets and written with a cross inside it because of its association with the enemy. The letters "CK", which are interpreted to stand for "Crip killer", are avoided and replaced by "cc". For example, the words "kick back" are written "kicc bacc", and block is written as "blocc". Many other words and letters are also altered due to symbolic associations. Crips traditionally refer to each other as "Cuz" or "Cuzz", which itself is sometimes used as a moniker for a Crip. "Crab" is the most disrespectful epithet to call a Crip, and can warrant fatal retaliation. Crips in prison modules in the 1970s and 1980s sometimes spoke Swahili to maintain privacy from guards and rival gangs.

=== Criminal rackets and street activities ===
As with most criminal street gangs, Crips have benefited monetarily from illicit activities such as illegal gambling, drug-dealing, pimping, larceny, and robbery. Crips also profit from extorting local drug dealers who are not members of the gang. Along with profitable rackets such as these, they also participate in vandalism and property crime, often for gang-pride reasons or simply enjoyment. This can include public graffiti (tagging) and "joyriding" in stolen vehicles.

The gang's current primary source of income is street-level drug distribution, however many Crip members also make notable amounts of funds from the black market sale of illicit firearms. The gang's size and power was greatly augmented by the profits from the street sale of crack cocaine throughout the 1980s. The gang's initial phase of growth and popularity was due to the explosion of crack cocaine in the United States during the 1980s.

== Crip-on-Crip rivalries ==
The Crips became popular throughout southern Los Angeles as more youth gangs joined; at one point they outnumbered non-Crip gangs by 3 to 1, sparking disputes with non-Crip gangs, including the L.A. Brims, Athens Park Boys, the Bishops, The Drill Company, and the Denver Lanes. By 1971 the gang's notoriety had spread across Los Angeles.

By 1971, a gang on Piru Street in Compton, California, known as the Piru Street Boys, formed and associated itself with the Crips as a set. After two years of peace, a feud began between the Pirus and the other Crip sets. It later turned violent as gang warfare ensued between former allies. This battle continued and by 1973, the Pirus wanted to end the violence and called a meeting with other gangs targeted by the Crips. After a long discussion, the Pirus broke all connections to the Crips and started an organization that would later be called the Bloods, a street gang infamous for its rivalry with the Crips.

Since then, other conflicts and feuds were started between many of the remaining Crip sets. As well as feuding with Bloods, they also fight each other — for example, the Rolling 60s Neighborhood Crips and 83 Gangster Crips have been rivals since 1979. In Watts, the Grape Street Crips and the PJ Watts Crips have feuded so much that the PJ Watts Crips even teamed up with a local Blood set, the Bounty Hunter Bloods, to fight the Grape Street Crips. In the mid-1990s, the Hoover Crips rivalries and wars with other Crip sets caused them to become independent and drop the Crip name, calling themselves the Hoover Criminals.

== Alliances and rivalries ==
=== Rivalry with the Bloods ===
The Bloods are the Crips' main rival. The Bloods initially formed to provide Piru Street Gang members protection from the Crips. The rivalry started in the 1960s when Washington and other Crip members attacked Sylvester Scott and Benson Owens, two students at Centennial High School. After the incident, Scott formed the Pirus, while Owens established the West Piru gang. In late 1972, several gangs that felt victimized by the Crips due to their escalating attacks joined the Pirus to create a new federation of non-Crip gangs that later became known as Bloods. Between 1972 and 1979, the rivalry between the Crips and Bloods grew, accounting for a majority of the gang-related murders in southern Los Angeles. Members of the Bloods and Crips occasionally fight each other and, as of 2010, are responsible for a significant portion of gang-related murders in Los Angeles. This rivalry is also believed to be behind the 2022 Sacramento shooting, where six people were killed. On June 15, 2025, a teenager allegedly opened fire during a festival in West Valley City, Utah, killing three people including an eight-month-old infant and wounding two others; one of the two wounded was pregnant and the fetus was not delivered as a result, thus leading a fourth murder charge. The shooter was suspected to be a Titanic Crip Gang member and was feuding with alleged Bloods members as gang epithets were being espoused during a friction; at least one of the victims had ties or friendships with the Bloods gang.

=== Alliance with the Folk Nation ===
In the late 1980s and early 1990s, as many Crip gang members were being sent to various prisons across the country, an alliance was formed between the Crips and the Folk Nation in Midwest and Southern U.S. prisons. This alliance was established to protect gang members incarcerated in state and federal prison. It is strongest within the prisons, and less effective outside. The alliance between the Crips and Folks is known as "8-ball". A broken 8-ball indicates a disagreement or "beef" between Folks and Crips.

== See also ==
- African-American organized crime
- Gangs in Los Angeles
- Gangs in Belize
- List of California street gangs
- Crip Walk
- Crips and Bloods: Made in America
