= Bang'n on Wax: The Best of the Crips =

Compilation album by Nationwide Rip Ridaz
- Released: February 11, 1997
- Recorded: 1993–1995
- Genre: Gangsta rap Hardcore rap West Coast rap
- Label: Dangerous Records
- Producer: Ron "Ronnie Ron" Phillips

Nationwide Rip Ridaz chronology
| Nationwide Rip Ridaz (1995) | Bang'n on Wax: The Best of the Crips (1997) | Betrayed (Can't Trust Nobody) (1998) |

Professional ratings
Review scores
| Source | Rating |
|---|---|
| Allmusic | 3/5 stars |

Bang'n on Wax: The Best of the Crips is a compilation album by the Crip rap group, Nationwide Rip Ridaz. The album was released on February 11, 1997, for Urban Avenue Records And This Album Contains 10 New Bonus Tracks Songs And 23 Old Songs For The 3 Previous Albums: This Album Contains 12 For Nationwide Rip Ridaz, 4 For Bangin' on Wax 2... The Saga Continues & 6 For Bangin' on Wax

== Track listing ==
| # | Title | Album |
|---|---|---|
| 1 | Ronnie (Wake-Up Call) | (Bonus Track) |
| 2 | Load'n the Clip (Set Trip) | (Bonus Track) |
| 3 | Better Watch Your Back (Fucc Slob) | (Bonus Track) |
| 4 | Smok'n H2O | (Bonus Track) |
| 5 | Not the Nigga You Thought I Was | (Bonus Track) |
| 6 | Hood Ratz | (Bonus Track) |
| 7 | Slob B.K.O. | (Bonus Track) |
| 8 | Going to Crip Nicc | (Bonus Track) |
| 9 | C Alright [Remix] | (Bonus Track) |
| 10 | Throw the C's in the Air | Nationwide Rip Ridaz |
| 11 | Nationwide Rip Ridaz | Nationwide Rip Ridaz |
| 12 | Swervin Thru the East Side | Nationwide Rip Ridaz |
| 13 | What We Celieve In | Nationwide Rip Ridaz |
| 14 | Crip Keeper | Nationwide Rip Ridaz |
| 15 | Everything Gonna C Alright | Nationwide Rip Ridaz |
| 16 | Break a Slob Down | Nationwide Rip Ridaz |
| 17 | Atlantic Drive Hoo Ride | Nationwide Rip Ridaz |
| 18 | Crip'n Ain't Easy | Bangin' on Wax |
| 19 | Crip Crip Crip | Bangin' on Wax |
| 20 | Puttin in Work | Bangin' on Wax |
| 21 | Steady Dippin' | Steady Dippin' (single) |
| 22 | Maccin' to Slob Bitches | Bangin' on Wax |
| 23 | East Side Rip Ridaz | Bangin' on Wax 2... The Saga Continues |
| 24 | Slob 187 | Bangin' on Wax 2... The Saga Continues |
| 25 | Every Dog Has His Day | Bangin' on Wax 2... The Saga Continues |
| 26 | Niggaz Don't Want No Problem | Nationwide Rip Ridaz |
| 27 | Compton Nut | Nationwide Rip Ridaz |
| 28 | Another Slob Bites the Dust | Bangin' on Wax |
| 29 | K's Up | Bangin' on Wax |
| 30 | Little Blue Devil | Nationwide Rip Ridaz |
| 31 | Crip 4 Life | Bangin' on Wax 2... The Saga Continues |
| 32 | Sess in the Day" (Chronic at Night) | Nationwide Rip Ridaz |
| 33 | Bang'n Outro | (Bonus Track) |
