= O.Y.G Redrum 781 =

American rapper (1972–2021)

redruM 781
- Also known as: O.Y.G redruM 781, @Bighomierum
- Born: Jermaine Carter; July 22, 1972, Bronx, New York, U.S.
- Origin: Inglewood, California, U.S.
- Died: October 30, 2021 (aged 49)
- Genres: Hip hop
- Occupations: Rapper; producer
- Instrument: Vocals
- Years active: 1992–2021
- Labels: Death Row (1993–1994); Warlock Records; Come Get It Records LLC
- Website: www.oygredrum781.com

RedruM 781 (born Jermaine Carter) (July 22, 1972 - October 30, 2021) was an American rapper from Inglewood, California. RedruM 781, Tweedy Bird Loc and producer Ronnie Phillips organized the hip hop project Bloods & Crips, a collaboration between Bloods and Crips members. He was a Piru gang member himself. redruM 781 is also known for his key role on "Bangin' on Wax", he and his fellow female MC Bloody Mary were the two key players for getting this particular Bangin' on Wax project off the ground. He was the cousin of the rapper Kurupt, with whom they had a long-time beef.

== History ==
Carter was born in Bronx, New York. He resided with his mother and young brother there until the age of 5, when he relocated to Inglewood, California with his family. Unfamiliar with their new surroundings and because of the infestation of drug dealers and addicts, pimps and prostitutes, hustlers, and gang-bangers, his mother feared when he and his young sibling would try to venture outside. Eventually his younger brother was initiated into the Avenue Piru Blood Gang (APG's, in Inglewood, CA); being fearful for his little brother's safety RedRum soon found himself being initiated into the same gang to protect his younger brother. He began to write and rhyme, to express his life experiences through his music. He actively started rapping when he attended Morningside High School, winning several talent shows and contests.

== Career ==
=== Death Row Records and later career ===
O.Y.G. redruM 781 has shared the booth with rapper Tupac Shakur. During 1993–1994, he joined Death Row Records, the famous label known for artists such as Tupac, Snoop Dogg, Dr. Dre and DJ Quik. That time there gave him a great opportunity to grow in his music, making collaborations with all of these artists in the label directed by the infamous Marion Suge Knight. He has recently shared the stage with the world-famous Ice-T and Dilated Peoples. Redrum has done numerous collaborations with well known West Coast artists such as Kam, N.U.N.E., Big Wy and a big roster of rappers.

=== Death ===
Carter died of bone cancer on October 30, 2021, at the age of 49. He is interred at Inglewood Park Cemetery.

== Discography ==
Studio albums

- 2007: Back Pay
- 2014: Blood Transfusion

Collaboration album(s)

- 1993: Bangin' on Wax (With Bloods & Crips)
- 1994: Bangin' on Wax 2... The Saga Continues (With Bloods & Crips)
- 1994: Murder Was the Case (With Young Soldierz)
- 1994: How Deep Is Your Hood (With Damu Ridas II)
- 1996: Bangin' on Wax: Greatest Hits (With Bloods & Crips)
- 2006: Rep Yo Set (With Bloods & Crips)

Mixtape(s)

- 2009: Blood Module Mixtape
- 2010: Stars & Stripes (With Apollo Mafia)
- 2011: The Legend Damu Ridaz

Guest Appearance(s)

- 2009: Day 1 (with Young Sau and Ula)
- 2013: Everything Aint Always In Color
- 2013: Never Settle (with Bossolo & Bigfase100)
- 2013: Conspiracy Theory (with Bossolo)

=== Solo singles ===
Year	Title	Album
2014	"Luv Neva Diez"	Blood Transfusion

== Guest appearances in videos ==
- Piru Love
- Bangin' on Wax (Duet)
- Won't Stop Being A Blood
- Shot Kallas
- Piru'N
