= Pirus =

Street gang alliance in Los Angeles

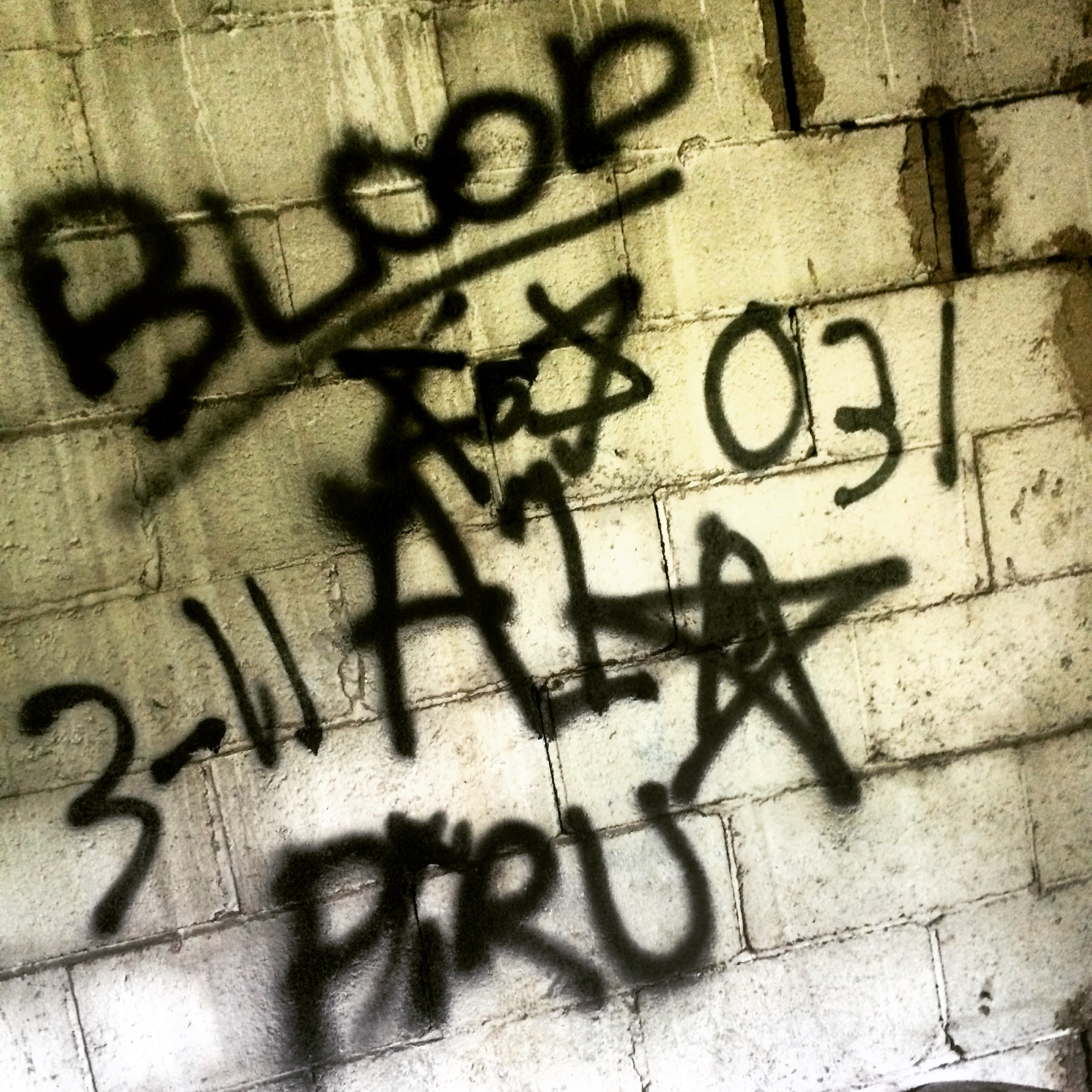
- Piru graffiti
- Founded: 1969; 57 years ago
- Founder: Sylvester Puddin Scott, Vincent Benson Owens
- Founding location: Compton, California, United States
- Years active: 1969–present
- Ethnicity: Primarily African American
- Activities: Drug trafficking, robbery, extortion and murder
- Allies: Bloods; Juggalos
- Rivals: Crips

The Pirus (/ˈpaɪ.ruː/) are a subset of the larger Bloods gang alliance, an organized crime group in the United States.

In the early 1960s, the Los Angeles, California, area was filled with street gangs fighting for power. At that time, the Crips, founded by Raymond Washington and Stanley "Tookie" Williams, were rapidly growing in influence. They expanded quickly, pressuring smaller gangs to either join them or submit.

A group of young Black Americans from Compton and nearby areas felt threatened by the Crips' dominance. They refused to submit, and eventually formed their own gang as the main rival to the Crips. From there, the Pirus were born, who later became part of the larger group known as the Bloods.

The name “Piru” originated from Piru Street in Compton, which was named after the town of Piru. It is from this area that young men from Piru Street opted to stand up to the Crips. They joined hands with some other smaller gangs that were not willing to be dominated. They all agreed to adopt red as their color against the blue of the Crips.

Over time, the violence between the Crips and the Bloods (with the Pirus included) became increasingly brutal. Gang wars erupted in the streets of Los Angeles, escalating from simple fights to shootings, murders, and territorial battles.

In the 1980s and 1990s, the conflict grew even larger with the rise of drug trafficking, especially crack cocaine. Many young members were recruited straight from the streets, often teenagers growing up in harsh environments with few options.

The Pirus and Bloods had their own codes, body language, and symbols. They also became well known for their hand signs and graffiti used to mark territory. While they were strongly associated with criminal activity, for some members, joining the gang was also seen as a form of "family" or protection from the tough streets of Los Angeles.

== History ==
In 1969, a gang called the Playboy Piru Bloods was founded by Sylvester Scott and Vincent Owens. According to some sources, the Piru Street Boys were initially associated with the Crips, but later had a falling-out. However, other sources dispute any alliance, claiming that the Piru Street Boys were victimised by the Crips. Nevertheless, by the early 1970s, the Playboy Piru Bloods formed an alliance with other smaller street gangs such as the Brims, Bishops and Denver Lanes, which also opposed the Crips. This alliance became known as the Bloods, as the members of this alliance called each other "blood".

Eventually, more Piru sets would form. There are 15 known Piru sets within the Greater Los Angeles area. Piru sets have fought against each other. For example, the Mob Piru and Fruit Town Piru developed a rivalry by the late 1990s, which resulted in the murders of several Mob Pirus associated with Death Row Records.

The 300 Playboy Piru Bloods are considered the forerunners to the Bloods, which is why the terms "Piru" and "Blood" are often used interchangeably. However, this interchangeable use of the terms is inaccurate, as many non-Piru gangs such as the Denver Lanes and Brims were also instrumental in the formation of the Bloods.

Furthermore, the Pirus are an alliance of street gangs within the larger Bloods alliance, meaning that not all Bloods sets will identify as "Pirus".

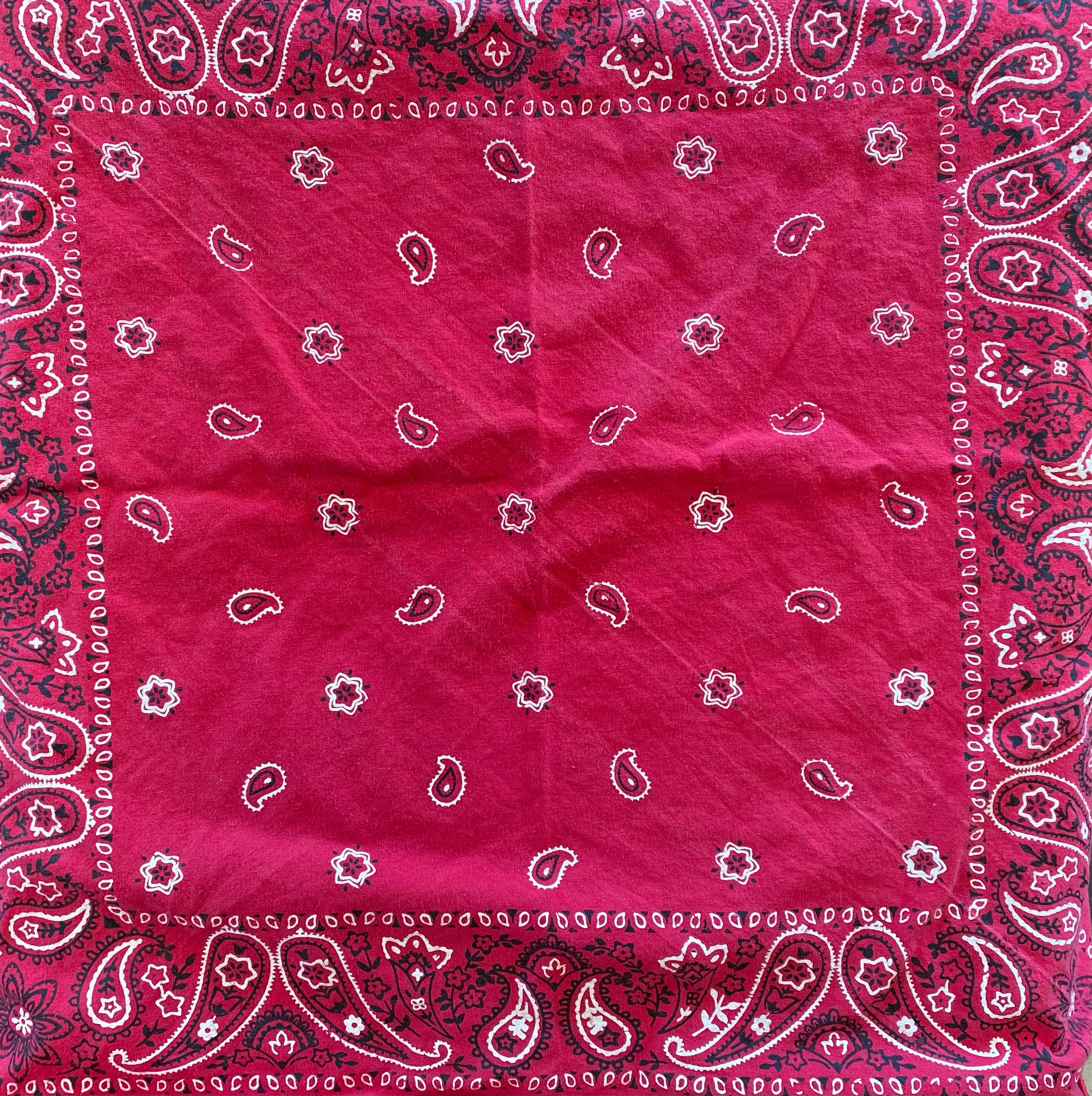
Piru sets often use burgundy or red bandanas as a form of identification, although other colors may be used to evade detection from law enforcement

== Piru sets ==
- Cedar Block Piru
- Elm Street Piru
- Fruit Town Piru
- Lueders Park Piru
- Mob Piru
- Tree Top Piru

== In popular culture ==
- The song "Piru Love" from Bangin' on Wax (1993) by Bloods & Crips makes references to various Piru sets, including Holly Hood, Elm Street and Lueders Park.
- The song "M.A.A.D City" from good kid, m.A.A.d city (2012) by Kendrick Lamar makes references to the Bloods, being Pirus particularly with the line "If Pirus and Crips, all got along" in the song.
- In the song "Strange Clouds" from Strange Clouds (2012) by B.o.B. featuring Lil Wayne, Lil Wayne references the Piru: "Piru, gangsters, outlaws" at the end of his verse.
- In the song "Let The Beat Build" from Tha Carter III (2008) by Lil Wayne, Lil Wayne references the Piru: "I can buy you, but I wouldn't try you, feed you to Piru".
- In the song "Stop Breathing" from Whole Lotta Red (2020) by Playboi Carti, he references the Piru: "I'm hangin' with the Pirus, hangin' with the Fives".

== See also ==
- African-American organized crime
- Gangs in Los Angeles
- List of California street gangs
