= Elm Street Piru =

American street gang

- Elm Street Piru gang apparel. Note the "CK", which stands for "Crip Killer".
- Territory: Started in Compton, California, but now active in various cities across the United States such as Norfolk, Virginia and Various cities in Virginia, Newark, New Jersey, St.Louis, Missouri, Atlanta, Georgia, Brooklyn, New York, Jamaica Queens, New York
- Ethnicity: Primarily African-American
- Allies: Cedar Block Piru; Fruit Town Piru; Tree Top Piru
- Rivals: South Side Compton Crips; Kelly Park Compton Crips; Santana Blocc Compton Crips

The Elm Street Piru (also known as the Elm Street Piru Bloods) are a "set" of the Piru gang alliance, which itself is part of the larger Bloods alliance. The Elm Street Piru started in Compton, California. It has since spread to other parts of the United States.

== History ==
After the Bloods alliance formed in 1972, many "sets" of the Bloods would emerge, including the Elm Street Piru. The Elm Street Piru has since spread to other parts of the United States, including Brooklyn, Atlanta, and Virginia.

=== Recruiting high school students in Virginia (2009) ===
In 2009, a 17-year-old girl, who was a member of the Elm Street Piru, was charged with recruiting high school students across northern Virginia. She was instructed to recruit other students by her father, who was the leader of the local Elm Street Piru set.

=== Conspiracy to murder a witness in South Carolina (2018) ===
In 2018, Antonio Devon Williamson, the leader of the Elm Street Piru for all of South Carolina, was charged with conspiring to kill a witness for an upcoming trial. The witness was the victim of an armed robbery committed by Williamson.

=== Shooting of Secoreia Turner in Atlanta (2020) ===
On July 4, 2020, 8 year-old Secoreia Turner was in a car with her mother, during the Rayshard Brooks protests. When Turner's mother failed to stop at a barricade erected by members of the Elm Street Piru, one gang member opened fire on the vehicle, killing Secoreia Turner.

== Depictions in media ==
- In the 1993 song "Piru Love" by the Bloods & Crips, Bloody Mary references the Elm Street Piru when she says "Every town has an Elm Street, but not a Freddy Krueger".
