= No Holds Barred (Tweedy Bird Loc album) =

Studio album by Tweedy Bird Loc
- Released: August 23, 1994
- Recorded: 1994
- Genre: West Coast hip hop, gangsta rap, g-funk
- Length: 1:08:39
- Label: Dangerous Records
- Producer: Tweedy Bird Loc, Ronnie Phillips

Tweedy Bird Loc chronology
187 Ride By (1992)	No Holds Barred (1994)

Singles from No Holds Barred
- 1. "Walk That Walk" Released: 1994

No Holds Barred is the second and last album by American gangsta rapper Tweedy Bird Loc. It was released on August 23, 1994, via Dangerous Records and includes features of members of Young Soldierz and the Bloods & Crips.

== Background ==
No Holds Barred was released soon when Tweedy was a member of the Bloods & Crips. This album became more commercially successful than Tweedy's debut album 187 Ride By. Tweedy in this album dissed rappers Eazy-E, MC Ren, Uncle Luke, Queen Latifah, KRS-One, Fat Joe, Vanilla Ice, Everlast, MC Serch, Pete Nice, Ultramagnetic MCs and Tim Dog, which most of the rappers dissed are from the East Coast.

== Track listing ==
1. "Album Bitch" (featuring Fo' Clips Eclipse)
2. "Tweedy For President" (featuring Young Soldierz)
3. "Dub Sacc"
4. "I'm Calling You A Bitch" (featuring Fo' Clips Eclipse) (Queen Latifah diss track)
5. "Walk That Walk" (featuring Young Soldierz, Keystone, 4-Clips, Lil' Leak and Big Stretch)
6. "Outta Here" (featuring Lil' Leak, O.Y.G Redrum 781, Fo' Clips Eclipse and Silkski) (KRS-One, Fat Joe, Vanilla Ice, Everlast, MC Serch, Pete Nice, Ultramagnetic MC's, Queen Latifah, Uncle Luke, Poison Clan, and Tim Dog diss track)
7. "Girls I've Done Fucc Before" (featuring Dog, Skit, Lil' Leak, Big Bun and Fo' Clips Eclipse)
8. "Keep On Walkin" (featuring Big Wy and Fo' Clips Eclipse)
9. "My Dicc Is Still Prejudiced"
10. "Gangsta Tweed"
11. "I Got My Strap"
12. "Fucc Miami" (Uncle Luke of 2 Live Crew and Poison Clan diss track) (Featuring Lil' Leak, Fo' Clips Eclipse, Keystone)
13. "C Thru The Bullshit" (featuring Baby Bird) (MC Ren diss track)
14. "Real Gangsta Shit (Skit)"
15. "Y'all Can't Fucc With Us" (featuring Fo' Clips Eclipse, Red Rum 781, Lil' Stretch, and Big Bun) (Eazy-E & MC Ren diss track)
16. "Street Jokes" (featuring Lil' Stretch, Troll, Fo' Clips Eclipse, Big Bun, Burnout and Da Marvin)
17. "Dangerous Is The Shit" (featuring Lil' Stretch, Big Wy, Lil' Leak, Red Rum, Fo' Clips Eclipse, Big Stretch, Keystone and Popps)
18. "Shout Out" (featuring Big Bun, D. Fingaz, Fo' Clips Eclipse and KeyLow G)

Eazy-E responded to "Y'all Can't Fucc With Us" on the track "Ole School Shit" from his Str8 off tha Streetz of Muthaphukkin Compton album. The verse however, was omitted for the final album due to Tweedy Bird Loc having made amends with him before his death.

This album was re-released in 2004, with a slightly different cover, Also the 2004 re release does not include the track "Album Bitch" and instead begins with the track "Tweedy for President".

== Samples ==
- "Dub Sacc" samples "Funky Drummer" by James Brown
- "My Dicc Is Still Prejudiced" samples Remind Me by Patrice Rushen
- "Fucc Miami" samples Dre Day by Dr. Dre
- "Y'all Can't Fucc With Us" samples "Wild Night" by One Way

== Album single ==
"Walk That Walk"

- Released: 1994
- Format: Video
