= Demonstrations in support of Donald Trump =

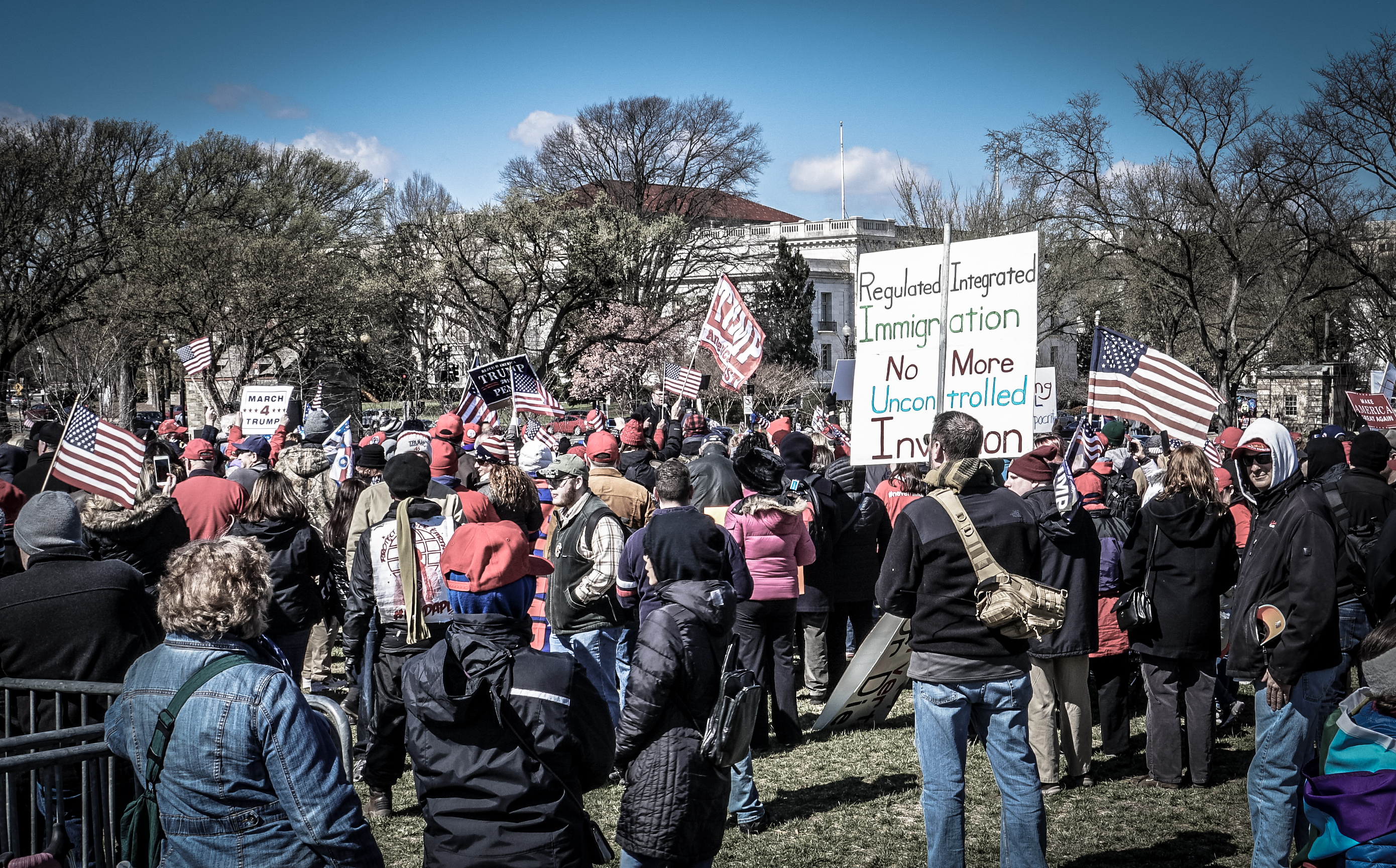
The March 4 Trump rally in Washington, D.C., in March 2017

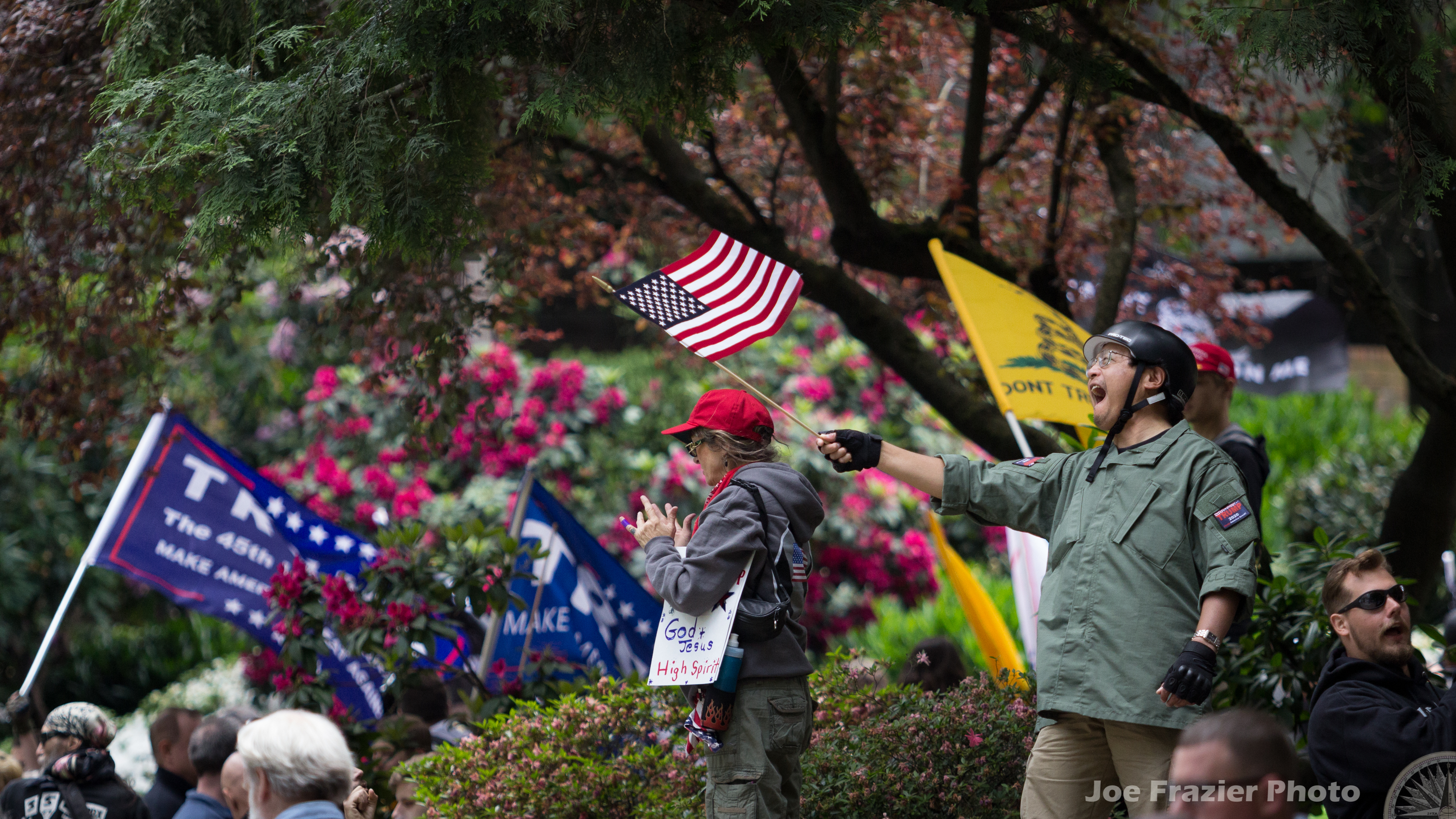
Trump Free Speech Rally participants in Portland, Oregon, in June 2017

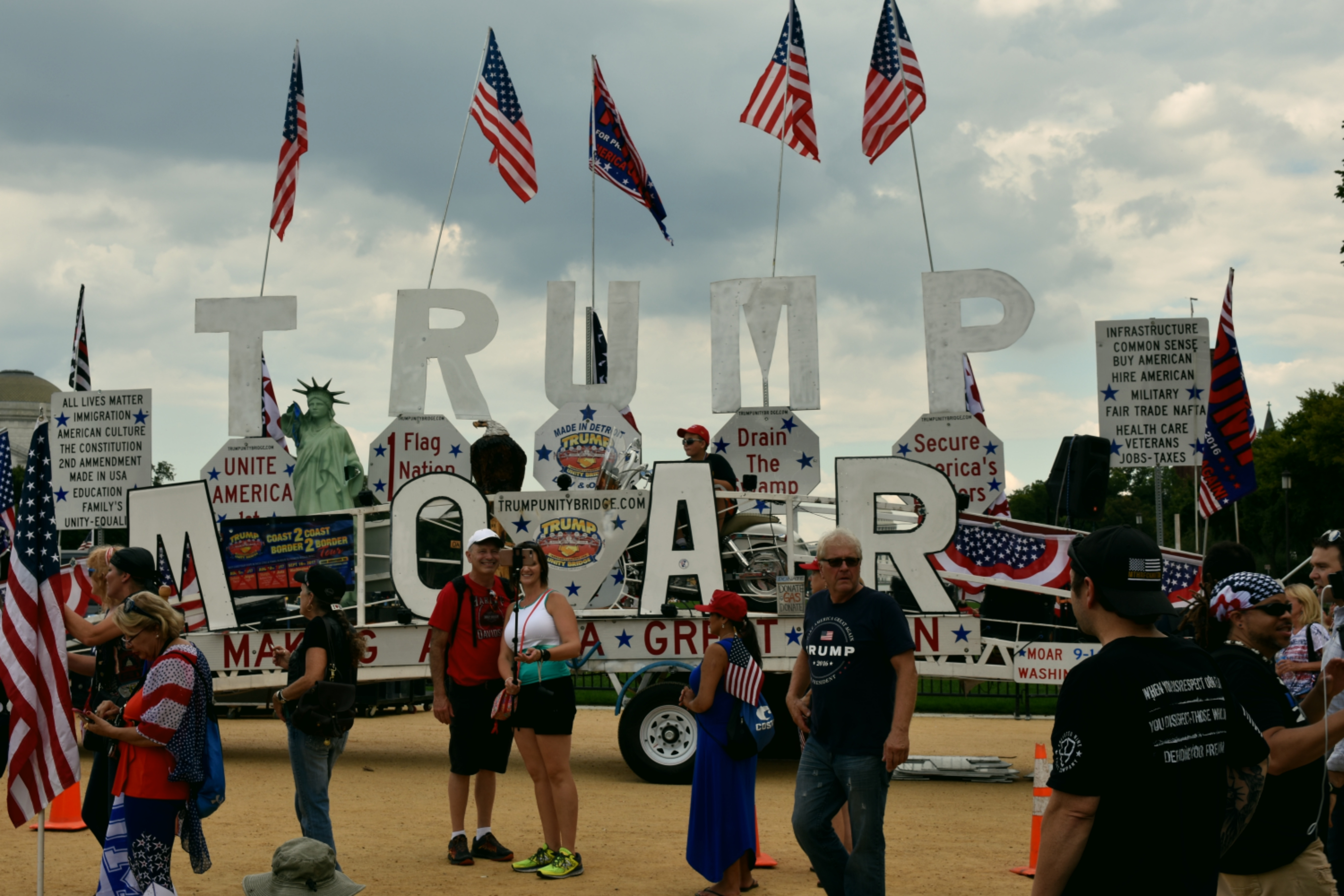
The Trump Unity Bridge at the Mother of All Rallies, in Washington, D.C., September 2017

Demonstrations in support of the presidency of Donald Trump were held in various parts of the United States following Trump's assumption of the office of President on January 20, 2017.

== Demonstrations during Trump's first presidency ==
=== 2017 ===
Although the series of nationwide, pro-Trump "Spirit of America" rallies held on January 27, 2017 failed to draw crowds, some subsequent rallies saw sizeable turnouts. The March 4 Trump was a series of more than two dozen demonstrations organized throughout the United States on March 4. The Trump Free Speech Rally was organized by Patriot Prayer and held in Portland, Oregon in June, and saw clashes with counter protesters. The Mother of All Rallies was held on the National Mall in Washington, D.C., on September 16 and drew several hundred participants.

=== 2018 ===
In July 2018, during President Trump's visit to the United Kingdom, demonstrators in support of far-right activist Tommy Robinson as well as Trump were held. The march in support of the US president were organized just a day after there was a held a big rally to oppose President Trump's visit to Britain. It had been planned from the beginning that Trump's supporters would merge with those of the EDL founder. The pro-Trump protesters wore Make America Great Again hats chanting "USA" as they also supported Tommy Robinson.

A day before the protests, Scotland Yard had announced that it would impose restrictions to "prevent serious disorder and disruption to Londoners" after violence was witnessed during the previous protest in a bid to free Robinson. The order stated that no vehicles would be involved and the two groups of protesters had to use the route from Temple Place to Whitehall. Even as the two groups merged to protest, Trump himself had not made any public remark on the imprisonment of Tommy Robinson. Nonetheless, his son Donald Trump Jr. had expressed his support for the extremist on his Twitter handle. Also, the Republican Congressman Paul Gosar who also attended the "Free Tommy" rally as well as the former White House chief strategist, Steve Bannon, who had given a message supporting the protest to free Robinson.

=== 2020 ===
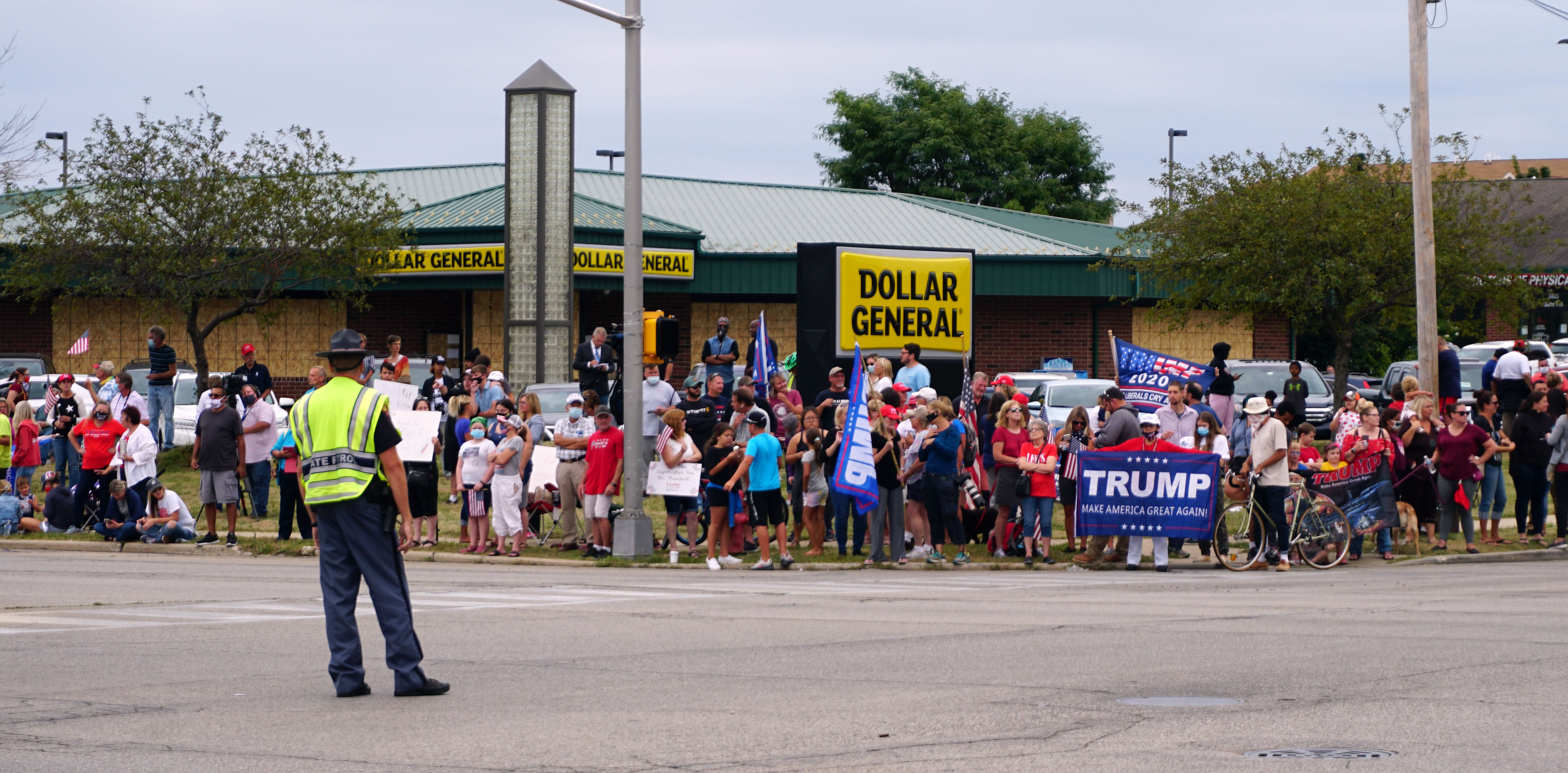
Supporters of President Trump during his visit to Kenosha, Wisconsin on September 1, 2020

Demonstrations were held in reaction to President Donald Trump's false claims of electoral fraud in light of Joe Biden's victory in the 2020 presidential election.

=== 2021 ===
On January 5 and January 6, 2021, supporters of U.S. President Donald Trump gathered in Washington, D.C., to protest against the result of the 2020 presidential election, and support Trump's demand for Vice President Mike Pence and Congress to reject president-elect Joe Biden's victory. On January 6 protestors marched on Congress and broke into the United States Capitol. Several buildings in the U.S. Capitol complex were evacuated. This also led multiple cabinet members, including Mick Mulvaney, Elaine Chao, and Betsy DeVos, to resign.

== See also ==
- Attempts to overturn the 2020 United States presidential election
- List of rallies for the 2016 Donald Trump presidential campaign
- List of post-election Donald Trump rallies
- Patriot Prayer
- Protests against Donald Trump
