= Nationwide Rip Ridaz (album) =

Studio album by Nationwide Rip Ridaz
- Released: September 26, 1995
- Recorded: 1995
- Genre: West Coast hip hop, gangsta rap
- Label: Dangerous Records
- Producer: Ron "Ronnie Ron" Phillips; Tweedy Bird Loc

Nationwide Rip Ridaz chronology
Bangin' on Wax 2... The Saga Continues (1994)	Nationwide Rip Ridaz (1995)	Betrayed (Can't Trust Nobody) (1998)

Singles from Nationwide Rip Ridaz
- 1. "Nationwide Rip Ridaz" Released: 1995; 2. "Crip Keeper" Released: 1995

Nationwide Rip Ridaz is the debut album by the American rap group Nationwide Rip Ridaz released in 1995.

== Track listing ==
1. "Throw the C's in the Air" – 3:08
2. "Nationwide Rip Ridaz" – 5:41
3. "Swervin' Thru the Eastside" – 3:35
4. "What We Celieve in" – 3:36
5. "Crip Keeper" – 6:18
6. "Everything Gonna C Alright" – 6:46
7. "Break-A-Slob-Down" – 4:05
8. "Skits" – 0:55
9. "Slobs Keep on Slippin'" (Remix) – 6:06
10. "Niggaz Don't Want No Problems" – 4:31
11. "Little Blue Devil" – 4:01
12. "Compton Nut" – 4:01
13. "Atlantic Drive Hoo Ride" – 3:30
14. "Sess In the Day Time, Chronic at Night" – 3:11
15. "Roll Call" – 1:49
16. "Bullets Don't Have No Names" – 5:09
