= Juggalo gangs =

American loosely organized hybrid gang based on the eponymous hip hop duo

Juggalos
- Founding location: Detroit
- Years active: Mid-2000s–present
- Ethnicity: Multi-ethnic
- Activities: drug trafficking, armed robbery, extortion, burglary, theft, vandalism, drive-by shootings, homicide, assault, alleged domestic terrorism
- Allies: Bloods; Crips; Gangster Disciples; Aryan Circle; KKK; Sureños; Aryan Nations; Folk Nation

Juggalo gangs are criminally-affiliated groups using the name and associated imagery from the Juggalo subculture, dedicated fans of the hip hop group Insane Clown Posse or any other Psychopathic Records artist. Juggalos have been classified as a criminal street gang by government and law enforcement agencies, including the Federal Bureau of Investigation, the National Gang Intelligence Center, and particularly in the states of Arizona, California, Florida, Michigan, Missouri, Pennsylvania, Texas, and Utah. Juggalo gang sets have been documented by law enforcement in at least 21 states, including those that do not recognize Juggalos as a gang at the state level.

Juggalo gangs band together under the Juggalo banner in order to engage in patterns of criminal activity. Unlike members of the general Juggalo subculture, these gangs have handbooks detailing gang ranks and responsibilities, and commit crimes for financial gain.

The National Gang Intelligence Center has also predicted that "The formation of rivalries or alliances to gangs outside their group will allow the Juggalos to evolve into a more sophisticated criminal entity through associations with hardened, experienced gang members."

Insane Clown Posse objects to characterizations of its fanbase as a gang and has challenged the federal gang designation in court. In December 2017, the U.S. Court of Appeals for the Sixth Circuit ruled that ICP failed to demonstrate harm caused by the FBI's 2011 report.

== Criminal activities ==
According to the National Gang Intelligence Center, there are more than one million self-proclaimed Juggalos across the United States. It is estimated that 85–90% of self-described Juggalos are peaceful, non-criminal music fans. The other 10–15% make up the Juggalo subculture's criminal element, which has been linked to numerous crimes including extortion, murder, domestic terrorism, drive-by shootings, drug trafficking, arson, burglary, armed robbery, aggravated assault, and weapon offenses, and has been documented collaborating with a wide array of street and prison gangs.

A series of arsons on a Navajo reservation have been linked to a local Juggalo gang set, which uses arson as a way to increase Juggalos' rank within the gang.

In 2009, members of a Juggalo set who claim to also be Southwest Bloods were charged with aggravated assault after one member who wanted to leave the gang was told to stab another member.

Juggalos in Rose Hill, Fairfax County, Virginia, have been linked to the Gangster Disciples.

Juggalos were identified by the New Jersey Department of Law & Public Safety as the most actively recruiting gang in New Jersey in 2010.

Also in 2010, a Juggalette who was not affiliated with any gang was assaulted by a new Juggalo gang called the Juggalo Killers, who knocked her unconscious before carving the letters "JK" into her chest, because they wanted to be the only group wearing Insane Clown Posse merchandise in their territory.

In 2012, a Juggalo gang member, who was wanted for violating probation, was placed on New Mexico's most wanted list.

Juggalos in Oregon have been reported to have extorted homeless and homosexual individuals on the street with the threat of beatings.

In August 2013, a Juggalo street gang member was arrested on charges of attempted murder, battery with a deadly weapon and possession of a controlled substance for allegedly attacking a cyclist with two meat cleavers in northeast Las Vegas, calling the man a "snitch".

Also in 2013, a Juggalo member in Washington state allegedly stabbed a 14-year-old boy at a birthday party after being mocked for his Juggalo affiliation.

=== Rivalries and alliances with other street and prison gangs ===
The National Gang Intelligence Center has noted a high number of Juggalo sets with ties to the Los Angeles-based Bloods gang, although the reason why Juggalos align themselves with Bloods sets remains unclear. In at least one case, the gangs aligned because they share the same gang color (red). Bloods and Juggalos have also collaborated to commit drive-by shootings.

In Pennsylvania, the Bloods and Crips dominate the incarcerated Juggalo gangs and use them for recruitment. In addition, certain Juggalo gangs have allied with certain violent prison gangs.

=== Potential for violence ===
According to the National Gang Intelligence Center, Juggalo gangs are a threat to the community because of their tendency for violence against law enforcement, innocent civilians, and other members of their group. Several law enforcement officers have commented on the Juggalo gangs' tendency toward extreme violence. Arizona Department of Public Safety Detective Michelle Vasey has also expressed concern at the Juggalos high potential for violence, stating "The weapons, they prefer, obviously, hatchets ... We've got battle-axes, we've got machetes, anything that can make the most violent, gruesome wound," and "Some of the homicides we're seeing with these guys are pretty nasty, gruesome, disgusting homicides, where they don't care who's around, what's around, they're just out to kill anybody".

=== Outside the United States ===
On June 28, 2010, three youths in Fairfield, New South Wales, Australia, believed to have been Juggalos attempted to rob a 20-year-old woman waiting outside a club.

== Reaction of artists and FBI lawsuit ==
The FBI's classification of Juggalos as a gang has caused confusion, resulting in many peaceful, non-criminal Juggalos being mistaken for their criminal counter-parts by police and by ordinary citizens. This type of confusion along with the fact that Hot Topic will no longer stock Psychopathic Records merchandise in states that legally consider Juggalos to be a gang, has prompted Insane Clown Posse to file a lawsuit against the FBI. In December 2012, ICP and Psychopathic Records quietly agreed to withdraw as plaintiffs in the case, and the FBI later released a report justifying their decision to classify Juggalos as a gang. However, ICP later announced that they would follow through with the lawsuit anyway. On August 23, 2013, the FBI asked a judge to dismiss the lawsuit against them.

In an interview given in 2013, Shaggy 2 Dope of Insane Clown Posse addressed the Juggalo gang classification and the impending FBI lawsuit. He stated that at first he believed that the classification of Juggalos was "pretty dope" because it would afford the band a tougher image, but later changed his mind after realizing the negative repercussions of being labeled a gang, such as gang enhancements for Juggalos who commit crimes. He also expressed concern about innocent Juggalos being targeted in "Shithole, Nebraska" by MS-13 members. He argued that while some Juggalos are criminals and gang members, he does not believe that Juggalos as a whole constitute a gang.

In January 2014 Insane Clown Posse along with the American Civil Liberties Union of Michigan filed suit again against the FBI. The suit aimed to have Juggalos no longer considered to be a gang and to have any "criminal intelligence information" about Juggalos destroyed. The suit was dismissed in July 2014, ruling that that band and its fans lack standing to bring the suit. The ACLU has stated that it intends to appeal the dismissal.

In September 2015, the U.S. Court of Appeals for the Sixth Circuit in Cincinnati overruled the circuit court and remanded the case for action consistent with the ruling.

On September 16, 2017, the Juggalo March was held in front of the Washington Monument reflective pool in Washington, D.C. calling for the declassification of Juggalos as gang members.

In December 2017 the Sixth Circuit ruled that ICP failed to demonstrate harm caused by the FBI's 2011 report.

== Gang identifiers ==
Gang identifiers used by Juggalo gang members include, but are not limited to:

- Gang colors, depending on the individual set - especially black, white, and red
- Psychopathic Records clothing and paraphernalia
- Tattoos related to Insane Clown Posse and Psychopathic Records, including the six "joker's card" album covers and the record label's "Hatchet Man" logo.
- Throwing gang signs
- Evil clown-themed face paint, mainly in black and white paint

== Perspective of law enforcement officers and gang investigators ==
The emergence of Juggalo gang subsets has created a sharp divide between gang investigators in the United States, with some considering the entire subculture to fit the definition of a criminal gang, while others stress that the subculture's criminal element makes up only a small portion of the Juggalo population. A report released by the National Gang Intelligence Center in 2010 supports the latter assertion.

A report released by the Rocky Mountain Information Network states that, "Just because we do not understand this phenomenon fully, we can’t as gang detectives ignore it ... We in law enforcement must be willing to take that extra step in our intelligence gathering to see if we are in fact dealing with a gang member or just a crazed fan."

Detective Michelle Vasey has stated that not all Juggalos are violent or criminals, and the music is not to blame: "We can't necessarily say that [the music's] to blame. But I think it definitely does have some influences. As an officer we have to decide when we're talking to these guys, who do we need to worry about and who don't we need to worry about."

Police Lt. Scott Conley has stated, "Those involved in the criminal side of (Juggalos) cause us some concern. If they are not involved in criminal activity, they can do their own thing, as long as they haven't crossed that criminal element line ... The attraction to that music, or those people following that music, I have no problem with. When they start breeding disruption in the community, showing up in libraries to harm people with butcher knives up their sleeves, I have a problem. I have to get involved with the community."

The official web site of Montana's department of corrections contains an explanation for Juggalos' classification as a security threat group: "the Juggalos are a recognized STG group that would never classify itself as a street gang. They are more like a cult that follows mimics and idolizes the music group, Insane Clown Posse. The music encourages and condones extreme acts of violence, which some Juggalos carry out. Juggalo members paint their faces black and white, dress in black clothing, attend raves together that often end violently, and consider themselves a family."

However, some law enforcement officers have been firm in their assertion that Juggalos are a criminal group. Police watch commander Jay Mackanin of Citrus Heights has stated that, "Juggalos are a gang. I know sometimes they say they're not, but they are".

Kelly Snyder, a former Drug Enforcement Administration officer who tracks Juggalo activity across the U.S., has stated that "It almost has the taste of a cult...The perception is that something is obviously not right here...It's not going to stop. So far they are almost committing the perfect crime".
