= Piru Love =

1993 song by Bloods & Crips

- Cover art of the CD single

Song by Bloods & Crips

from the album Bangin' on Wax
- Released: March 9, 1993
- Genre: Gangsta rap
- Label: Dangerous Records
- Producers: Ron Phillips (executive producer); J. Stank (producer)

"Piru Love" is a song from the 1993 album Bangin' on Wax by the gangsta rap group Blood & Crips. It was subsequently released as a single, along with several alternate versions of the song. It is the group's most popular single.

== Composition ==
The song sampled "Computer Love" by Zapp & Roger. The song features verses sung by Fo' Clips, Bloody Mary, RedruM 781 and Lil' Leak (CK). In the song, Bloody Mary makes references to several Piru sets, including Elm Street, Fruit Town, Tree Top and Lueders Park.

== Track listing ==
- CD Single (27 July, 1993)
1. Piru Love (Radio Version) – 4:31
2. Piru Love (Long Version) – 6:13
3. Piru Love (Explicit Version) – 6:11
4. Puttin' In Work – 5:25

== Reception ==
Suge Knight was impressed after hearing "Piru Love" and sought out Bloody Mary, who he signed to Death Row Records in 1994. The Chicago Tribune considered "Piru Love" one of the best songs that reference Rosecrans Avenue. The Los Angeles Times included the song on a similar list.
