= Betrayed (Can't Trust Nobody) =

Studio album by Nationwide Rip Ridaz
- Released: 1999
- Genre: West Coast hip hop, gangsta rap
- Label: Dangerous Records
- Producer: Ron "Ronnie Ron" Phillips; Tweedy Bird Loc

Nationwide Rip Ridaz chronology
Nationwide Rip Ridaz (1995)	Betrayed (Can't Trust Nobody) (1999)

Betrayed (Can't Trust Nobody) is the second and last album by the American rap group Nationwide Rip Ridaz released in 1999.

This album introduced two new members of the group: Mac-11 and Duv Mac.

== Track listing ==
1. "Kick 'N' Knowledge"
2. "Gangsta Boogie"
3. "Niggas Don't Bang Like They Used To"
4. "Days of Old" (DuvMac)
5. "Crip Crazy"ft. (DuvMac)
6. "Betrayed"
7. "I'll Ride for You"
8. "Throw the C's in the Air" (Remix)
9. "Lost & Sherm'ed Out"
10. "Take It Personal"
11. "Crip: No Transformers"
12. "Crip Loc"
13. "Between Heaven or Hell"
14. "Crip Card"
15. "Watts Niggas Quick to Pop Niggas"
16. "Drama"
17. "Payin' Dues" Ft. (DuvMac)
18. "No One Can Save You"
19. "Till I Die"
