= Bangin' on Wax: Greatest Hits =

Greatest hits album by Bloods & Crips
- Released: August 27, 1996
- Recorded: 1992–1994
- Genre: Gangsta rap; hardcore rap; West Coast hip hop
- Label: Dangerous
- Producer: Ron "Ronnie Ron" Phillips

Bloods & Crips chronology
Bangin' on Wax 2... The Saga Continues (1994)	Bangin' on Wax: Greatest Hits (1996)

Professional ratings
Review scores
Source	Rating
AllMusic	4/5 stars

Bangin' on Wax: Greatest Hits is a compilation album by American rap group, Bloods & Crips. The album was released on August 27, 1996, by Dangerous Records. The album was produced by Ron "Ronnie Ron" Phillips and written by Bloods & Crips members.

== Track listing ==
No.	Title	Length
1.	"Slob B.K.O."	5:55
2.	"Going to Crip Nick"	1:16
3.	"C-Alright"	4:53
4.	"Break a Slob Down"	4:11
5.	"Steady Dippin'"	4:55
6.	"Nationwide Rip Ridaz"	5:47
7.	"Wish You Were Here"	4:26
8.	"Crip, Crip, Crip"	4:50
9.	"Don't Stress Me"	4:22
10.	"Shit Ain't Over"	3:59
11.	"Shuda Beena B-Dog"	4:38
12.	"Mafia Lane"	4:12
13.	"Damu Ride"	4:46
14.	"Piru Love"	4:30
15.	"Bangin' on Wax"	4:17
16.	"Time Is Gone, Nigga"	4:47
