= Juggalo =

Fan of hip hop group Insane Clown Posse

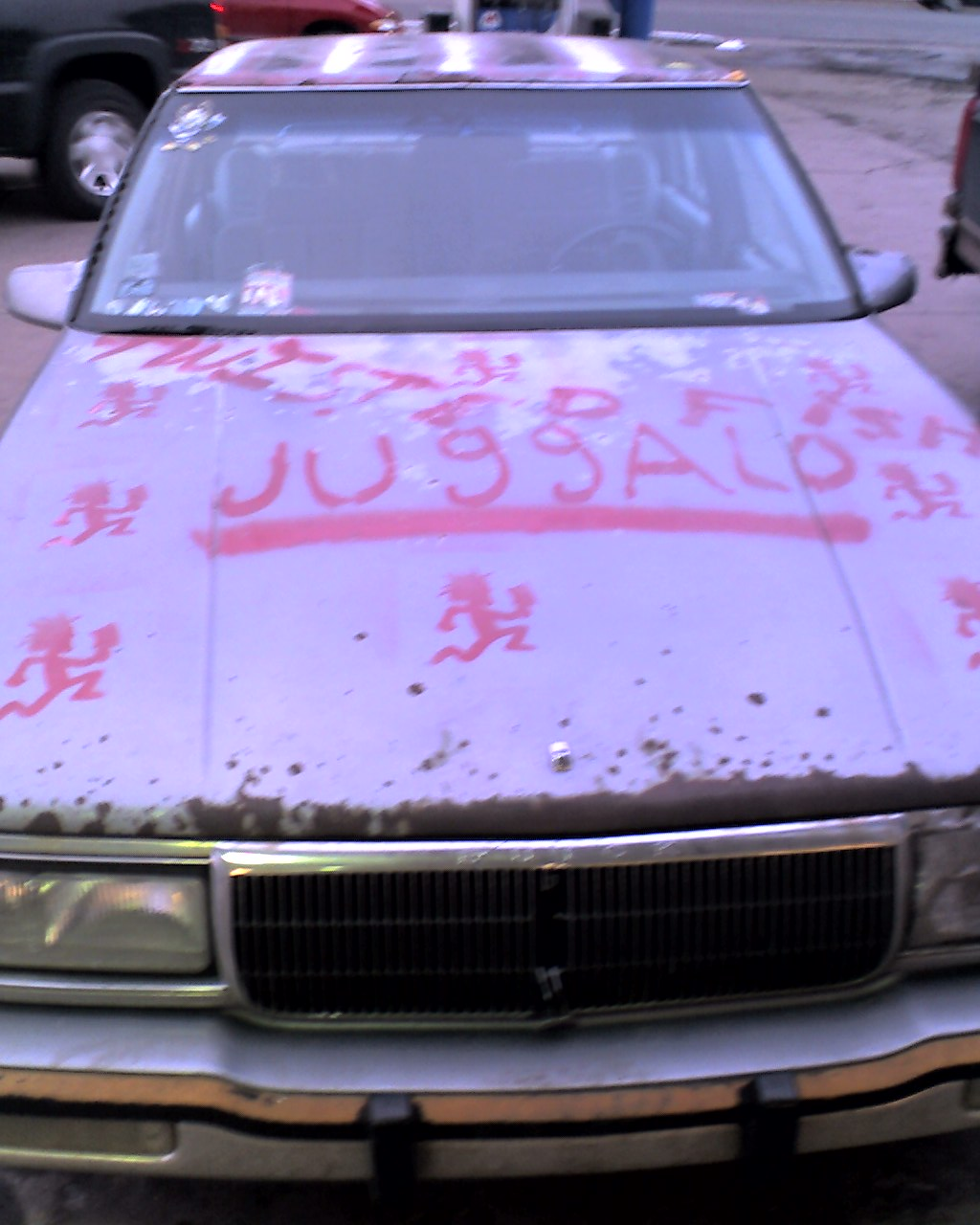
A car painted with the word juggalo and reproductions of the Psychopathic Records logo

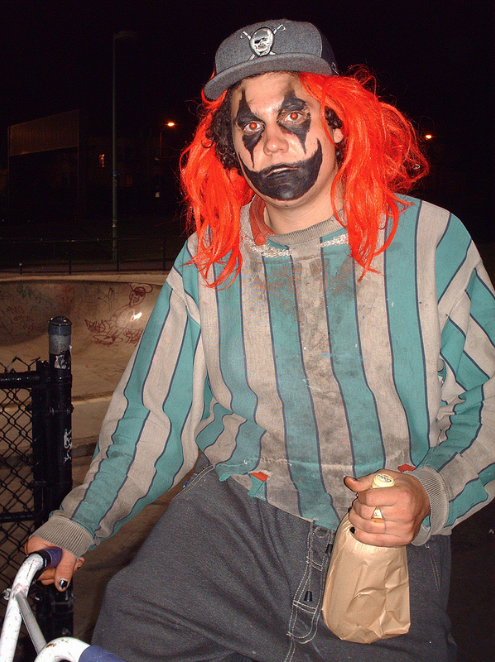
A juggalo on his bike in California

A juggalo (feminine juggalette, or juggala in Spanish) is a fan of the hip-hop group Insane Clown Posse or any other hip-hop group signed to Psychopathic Records. Juggalos have developed their own idioms, slang, and characteristics. The Gathering of the Juggalos, alternatively known as just "The Gathering", is a notable annual festival held by juggalos and the artists that they support, which have included rap stars such as Busta Rhymes, Ice Cube, and MC Hammer; over its first eleven events (2000–2010), the festival drew a total attendance of about 107,500 fans, averaging nearly 9,800 per year, with a peak of 20,000 in 2010.

== History ==
The term juggalo originated during a 1994 live performance by Insane Clown Posse. During the song "The Juggla", Violent J addressed the audience as Juggalos, and the positive response resulted in Violent J and Shaggy 2 Dope using the word thereafter to refer to themselves and their friends, family, and fans, including other Psychopathic Records artists. The fanbase boomed following the release of their third album, Riddle Box, in 1995, leading Insane Clown Posse to write the songs "What Is a Juggalo?" and "Down With the Clown" for their 1997 album The Great Milenko.

== Characteristics ==
The roots music journal No Depression classified Juggalos as "goth clowns", as well as "a true community of music-lovers with a strange and warped view of today’s music scene and a strong connection to modern hillbilly culture." According to Shaggy 2 Dope, "[Juggalos come] from all walks of life – from poverty, from rich, from all religions, all colors. ... It doesn't matter if you're born with a silver spoon in your mouth, or a crack rock in your mouth." Juggalos have compared themselves to a family. However, the subculture is most predominant in rural North America.

Common characteristics of identifying a member of the Juggalo subculture are as follows:

- Drinking and spraying the inexpensive soft drink Faygo
- Listening to horrorcore and other types of underground rap music
- Wearing face paint, generally those either like an evil clown or perhaps similar to corpse paint
- Wearing Hatchet Gear or Chapter 17 branded clothes
- Having the Hatchet man logo applied on personal effects and, die cast, worn as jewelry
- Doing hair in the "spider legs" style, i.e. like the Twiztid members
- Displaying the gesture of "wicked clown", the "westside" sign with the left hand and the "C" sign in American Sign Language with the right, with arms crossed over
- Making and responding to "whoop whoop" calls
- Expressing a (generally) tongue-in-cheek obsession with murder, committed with a blade weapon

Juggalos view the lyrics of Psychopathic Records artists, which are often violent, as a catharsis for aggression.

Many characteristics of the Juggalo culture originated in the 1980s, when Joseph Bruce (Violent J) and his family were living in poverty. He and his brother Robert received all their clothes from rummage sales, and their food from canned food drives held at their school. Due to their poverty, the Bruce Brothers were the butt of many jokes in school. However, the brothers were not ashamed of their living standards and instead embraced them. Joe even made a name for themselves, Floobs. According to Joe, a Floob was essentially a scrub, but not just an ordinary scrub. A Floob "wore the same old shoes and shitty clothes from rummage sales ... but ... didn't even have to be cool. [Floobs] turned [their] scrubbiness into something [they] could be proud of." Though Joe only specifically names himself and his brother as Floobs, he alludes to other Floobs whom he had not met or known of, but were living in the same conditions as he and his brother; the respect that Floobs had for each other and their family-like embrace of likewise people influenced the philosophy held among Juggalos.

== Events and activities ==
=== Gathering of the Juggalos ===
The Gathering of the Juggalos (The Gathering or GOTJ) is an annual festival put on by Psychopathic Records, featuring performances by the entire label as well as numerous well-known musical groups and underground artists. It was founded by Robert Bruce, Insane Clown Posse, and its label in 2000. The Gathering has featured bands of a variety of genres within hip-hop and rock, though the majority of the acts perform horrorcore and hardcore hip-hop, similar to that of Psychopathic Records artists.

Described by Joseph Bruce as a "Juggalo Woodstock", the Gathering of the Juggalos spans four days and includes concerts, wrestling, games, contests, autograph sessions, karaoke, and seminars with artists. According to the roots music journal No Depression, the event displays the Juggalo culture's connection to hillbilly culture, by featuring "backyard wrestling (a tradition that both members of ICP started out in), wild west imagery, county fair performers like Naughty By Nature and Gallagher ... and acres and acres of white guys in wife beaters getting high." Over its first eleven events, the festival has drawn an attendance of about 107,500 fans.

In July 2012, the media organization Vice released American Juggalo, a twenty-minute film documenting the festival, through their subsidiary music channel, Noisey. Sean Dunne directed the work.

On August 9, 2013, 24-year-old Cory Collins died at the festival, following three more deaths at previous festivals.

=== Juggalo Day ===
In 2012, Shaggy and Violent J created the annual Juggalo Day, a yearly event to thank and celebrate its fans.

2013 saw the beginning of the album shows, playing a joker card album from front to back.The "Riddle Box Show" in Detroit also took place in the same year, followed by the 2014 "Great Milenko Show" in Columbus, Ohio. Finally, in 2015, the free concert called "Take Me Home" took place at the Detroit Masonic Temple.

=== Charities and community service ===
==== The Dead Stephanie Memorial Cleanup ====
From 2008-2011, Florida Juggalos organized The Juggalo Cleanup Crew to pick up trash for the Dead Stephanie Memorial Cleanup, in honor of Stephanie Harris, a high school student who died of diabetes in 2008. It is unknown if the event is still active today.

==== Hatchet House and community outreach ====
In Buffalo, New York, a group of Juggalos formed the Juggalos outreach program and started cleaning up Buffalo's East Side. In addition to the community cleanup, they run Hatchet House. The Hatchet House operates a 24/7 helpline referring community members in crises to services and serves as a base of operations for volunteer work and community service programs.

==== Juggalos Making A Difference (J.M.A.D.) ====
Juggalos in Denver, Colorado founded the charitable organization Juggalos Making A Difference.

== Juggalo gangs ==
Although the Juggalo subculture stems from the horrorcore subgenre of the general hip-hop music fandom, criminal and gang-related activity has been attributed to self-described "Juggalos", including assaults, drug trafficking, vandalism, burglary, shootings, theft, robbery, and numerous murders.

=== Interaction between violent and nonviolent Juggalos ===
In October 2010, Ogden, Utah police lieutenant Scott Conley reported that the Juggalo Killers gang had robbed and assaulted a non-gang-affiliated Juggalo.

According to a 2011 National Gang Intelligence Center report, the Juggalo subculture is split between violent and nonviolent factions. The report asserts that some members of the Juggalos street gang look down on non-criminal Juggalos, considering them to be weak. Both Juggalo gang affiliates and nonviolent Juggalos believe in the Juggalo "family." However, some nonviolent Juggalos do not believe that any gang-related activity should be associated with the Juggalo lifestyle.

=== Public and artist reactions ===
The classification of Juggalos as a criminal gang was ridiculed by the technology magazine Wired in a November 2011 article, with journalist Spencer Ackerman referring to previous scandals involving FBI harassment of Muslim-Americans.

In August 2012, Psychopathic Records launched the website juggalosfightback.com for fans to submit stories about unfair treatment by law enforcement. ICP intended to use these stories in their legal battle to declassify Juggalos as a gang. By 2022, the website registration expired. (Note: The url now points to an online gambling site.)

In September 2012, the Insane Clown Posse filed a lawsuit against the FBI about the gang-listing. In December 2012, ICP agreed to withdraw their involvement as plaintiffs.

On January 8, 2014, Insane Clown Posse along with the American Civil Liberties Union of Michigan filed suit again against the FBI. The suit aimed to have Juggalos no longer considered to be a gang and to have any "criminal intelligence information" about Juggalos destroyed.

== In popular media ==
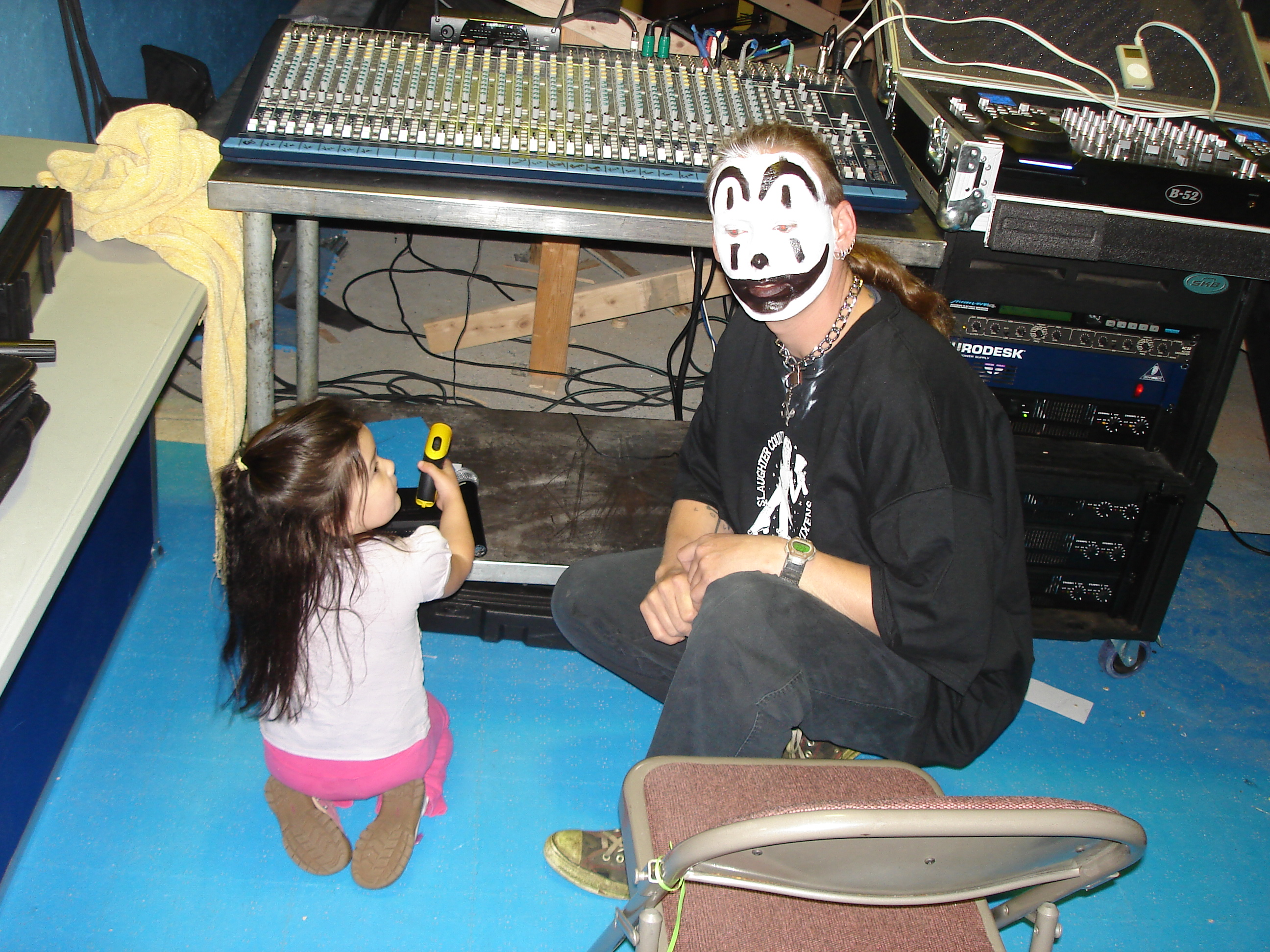
A man in Juggalo face paint next to a small child

Psychopathic Records launched the professional wrestling company Juggalo Championship Wrestling in 1999.

In 2009, Psychopathic Video filmed a documentary about Juggalos entitled A Family Underground.

Mainstream media has also made references to the Juggalo subculture. In 2009, television sketch comedy Saturday Night Live began a reoccurring series of sketches about the "Kickspit Underground Rock Festival" which parodies Juggalos and the Gathering of the Juggalos. The following year, the television show It's Always Sunny in Philadelphia featured a Juggalo character in the episode "Dee Reynolds: Shaping America’s Youth". In 2011, the television show Workaholics aired an episode called "Straight Up Juggahos" that revolved around Juggalos and an Insane Clown Posse concert. Later that year, an independent documentary entitled American Juggalo was released. Gathering Prey, the 2015 crime novel in the Lucas Davenport series by John Sandford, features a villain named Pilate who, with his disciples, are Juggalos. Much of the book takes place at the Gathering of the Juggalos. The 2018 film Family includes characters that identify as Juggalos and a pivotal scene takes place at a Gathering of the Juggalos.

The popular fiction webcomic Homestuck notably features a juggalo-like religion known as the "Cult of the Mirthful Messiahs," whose practitioners bear a strong resemblance to juggalos, and which established a "Dark Carnival" much like the Gathering of the Juggalos. Insane Clown Posse and their work appear throughout the series; at one point, Violent J and Shaggy 2 Dope become the first and last juggalo presidents of the United States.

=== Notable Juggalos ===
Several celebrities and other well-known figures have identified themselves as Juggalos. These include actors Kane Hodder and Charlie Sheen; professional wrestlers Kazushige Nosawa, Vampiro, Colt Cabana, and Willie Mack; and rappers Chuck D, Coolio, Kung Fu Vampire, MURS, MC Lars and Vanilla Ice.

== See also ==
- Juggalo March
