= Tree Top Piru =

Group of the Piru gang alliance

- Tree Top Piru graffiti
- Founded: 1970s West side of Compton but active in Houston, St. Louis, Newark, Norfolk, Virginia, Portsmouth, Virginia, and Birmingham
- Years active: 1970s–present
- Ethnicity: Primarily African-American
- Allies: West Side Piru; Campanella Park Piru
- Rivals: Compton Varrio Tortilla Flats; Fruit Town Piru; Most Compton Crips
- Notable members: DJ Quik; Hi-C (rapper, born 1973); YG (rapper)

The Tree Top Piru (also known as the Bompton Tree Top Piru) are a "set" of the Piru gang alliance, which is itself a part of the larger Bloods gang alliance. The gang gained notability for its connection to rappers DJ Quik, Hi-C, and YG. The gang started in Compton, California in the 1970s, but has since spread to other parts of the United States.

== History ==
=== Formation ===
The Tree Top Piru formed in Compton, California in the 1970s. The gang was named after the various streets in their territory which are named after trees including Acacia Avenue, Poplar Street, Maple Street, Spruce Street, Cedar Street, and Elm Street.

Eventually, the Tree Top Piru would spread to other parts of the United States, including Tennessee, Texas and Maryland.

=== Tree Top Piru in Baltimore ===
In 2007, a high-ranking female member of the Tree Top Piru in Baltimore named Michelle Hebron killed David Leonard Moore, who Hebron believed to be a rival gang member. After killing Moore, Hebron wrote a poem, which was used as evidence in her trial:

"I guess just shot a nigga in the head cause he wear blue but claim red. Plus I just wanted the satisfaction of seeing a nigga dead."

Hebron was sentenced to 30 years in prison for the murder and racketeering.

=== Tree Top Piru in Texas ===
In January 2017, a Tree Top Piru member in Houston named Javan Oxavia Williams shot dead Charlie Bennett Jr., who Williams had an argument with. Williams committed a second murder in February 2017, when he killed Tonius Wayne Frank and ransacked Frank's apartment. Williams was sentenced to life in prison for the two murders.

In August 2024, Texas Department of Public Safety announced the apprehension of Dewarren Donta Knowles, a Tree Top Piru member and fugitive wanted for sex offenses against a child.

== Depictions in media ==
- In the 1993 song "Piru Love" by Bloods & Crips, the Tree Top Piru is mentioned in the lines "Tree Top is to the left, Fruit Town is on the right."
- In his 1995 song "Dollaz + Sense", DJ Quik, who was affiliated with the Tree Top Piru, refers to the gang when he says "West side trees sprayin' all the fleas."
