= Juggalo March =

Rally by fans of Insane Clown Posse hiphop group

Juggalo March on Washington
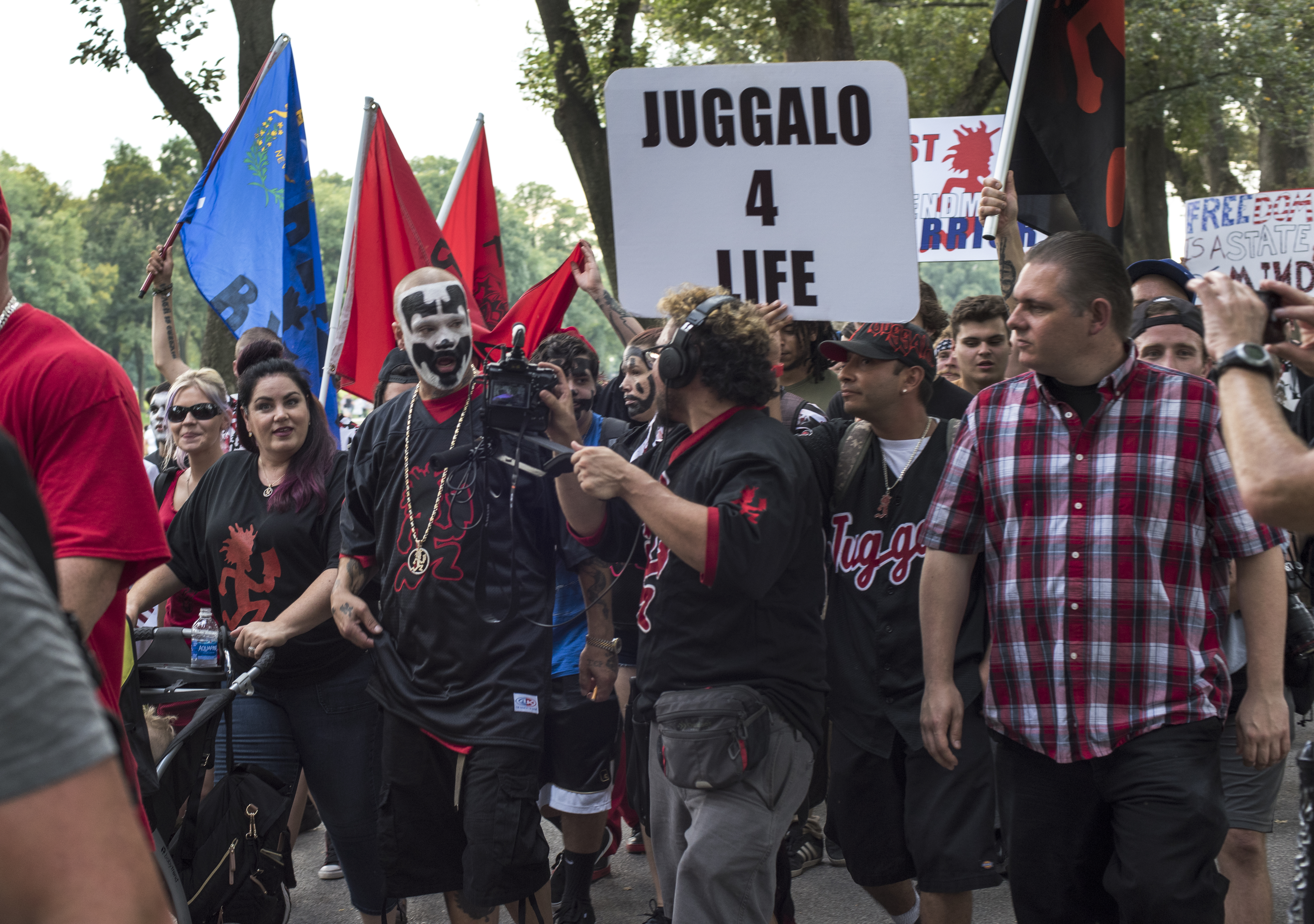
- Shaggy 2 Dope along with other juggalos during the march.
- Date: September 16, 2017
- Location: Washington, D.C., United States
- Cause: Protesting the FBI's classification of Juggalos as a gang
- Participants: ~1,500

The Juggalo March, or Juggalo March on Washington, was a rally held on September 16, 2017, in Washington, D.C., United States. The event, organized by fans of hip hop group Insane Clown Posse that are known as juggalos and juggalettes, took place on the same day as several other demonstrations around the city, including one in support of President Donald Trump called the Mother of All Rallies. The march was organized to protest the FBI's classification of Juggalos as a gang.

Approximately 1,500 demonstrators gathered near the Lincoln Memorial Reflecting Pool. The rally officially started at noon.

== Background ==
Juggalos are fans of the hip hop group Insane Clown Posse. Members often have tattoos and wear face paint. The FBI has classified juggalos as a "loosely organized hybrid gang", and in 2011, the Justice Department's Gang Task Force said group members were "forming more organized subsets and engaging in more gang-like criminal activity".

Jason Webber, an organizer of the march and publicist for Insane Clown Posse's record label Psychopathic Records, said the government's labeling "exposed law-abiding Juggalos to harassment and discrimination by police, employers and others". March supporters claimed they were a nonviolent group who should not be compared to gangs like the Bloods and the Crips.

== See also ==
- Gathering of the Juggalos
- List of protest marches on Washington, D.C.
