= Trump Unity Bridge =

Decorated float in the United States

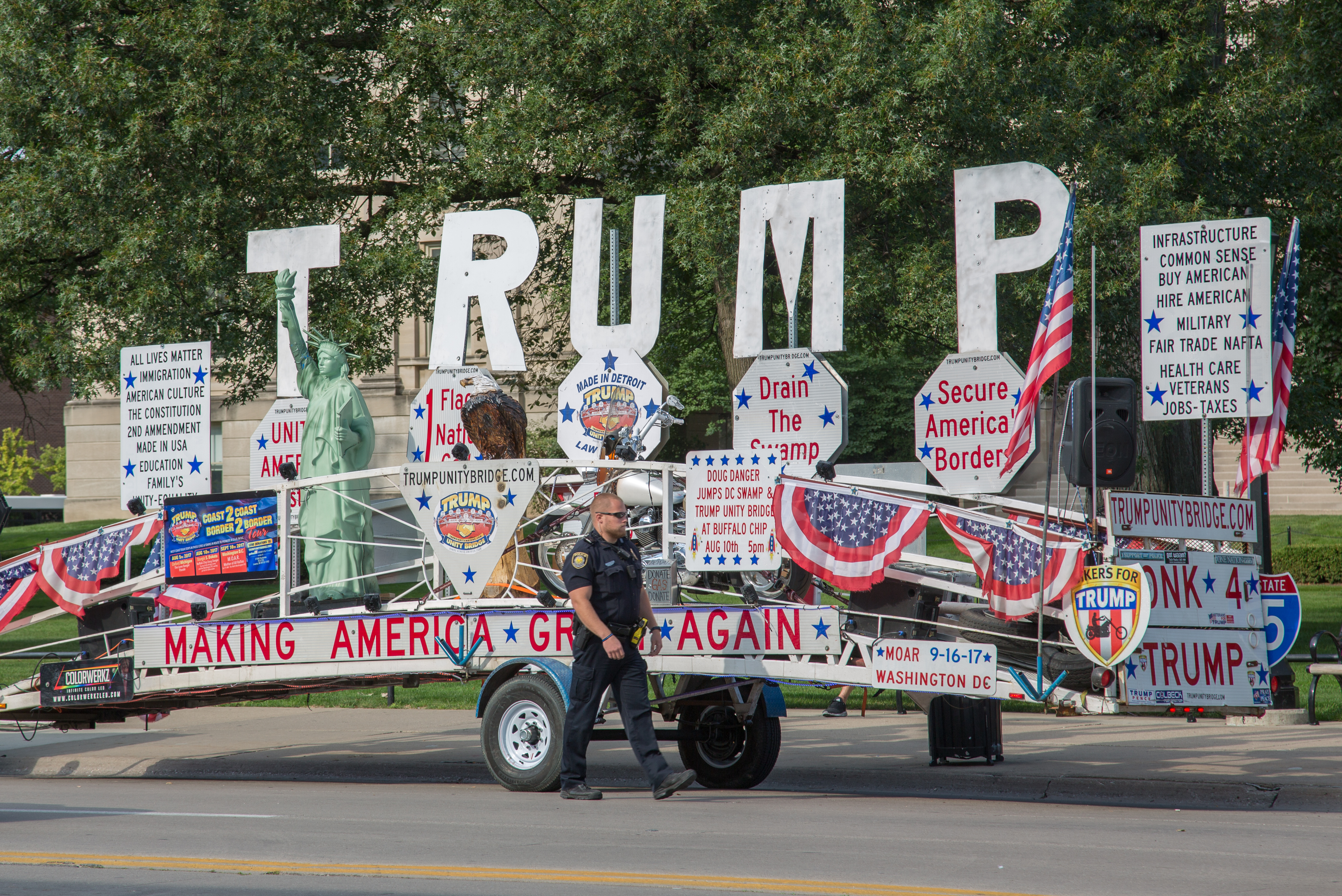
The "bridge" in Iowa City, August 2017

The Trump Unity Bridge, also known as the Presidential Trump Unity Bridge and Trump Mobile, is a decorated float being driven by a Michigan resident throughout the United States, supporting the 45th President, Donald Trump. The float appeared at Trump's inauguration, the 2017 Women's March, and the Mother of All Rallies.

== Description ==
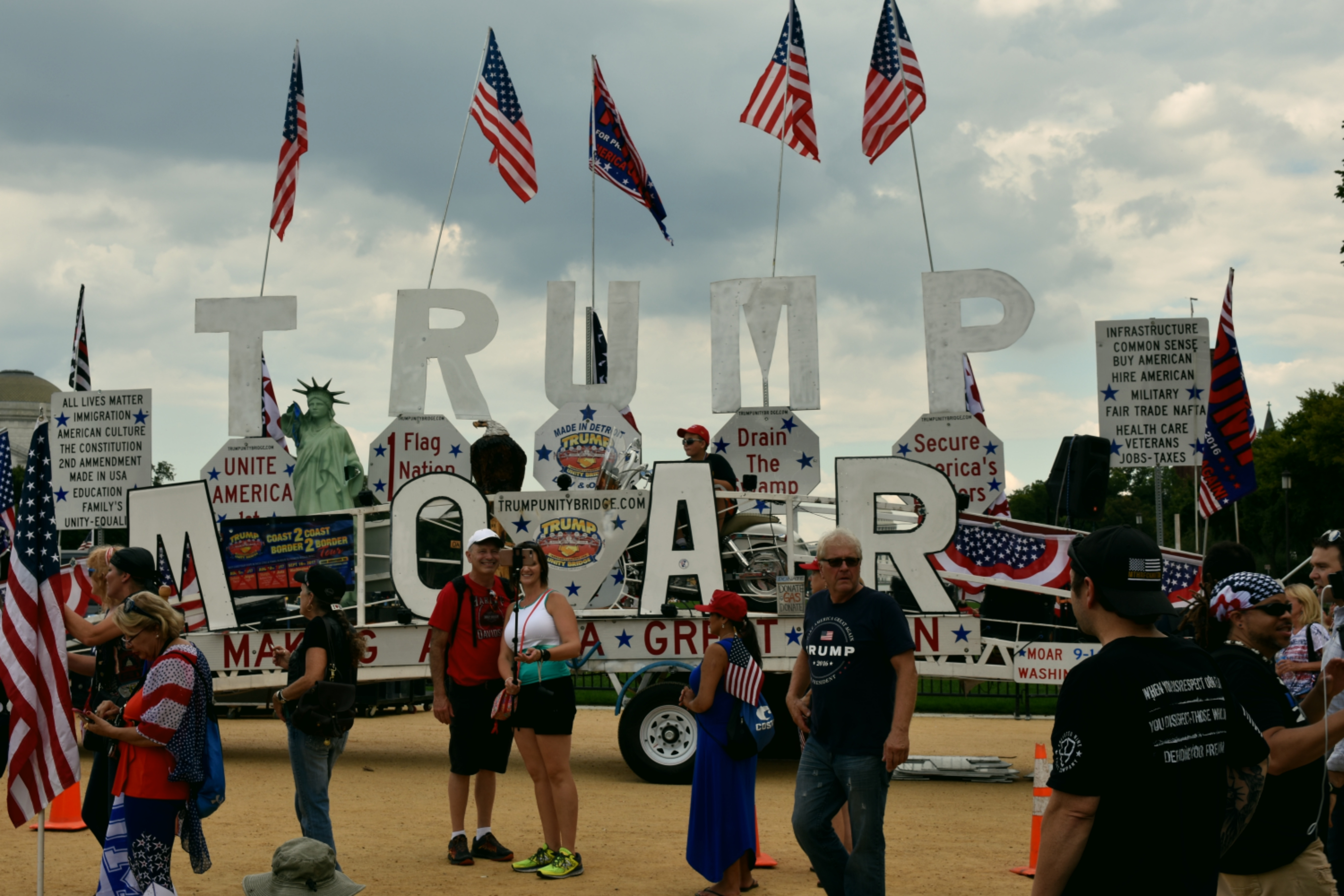
The Trump Unity Bridge at the Mother of All Rallies, in Washington, D.C., September 2017

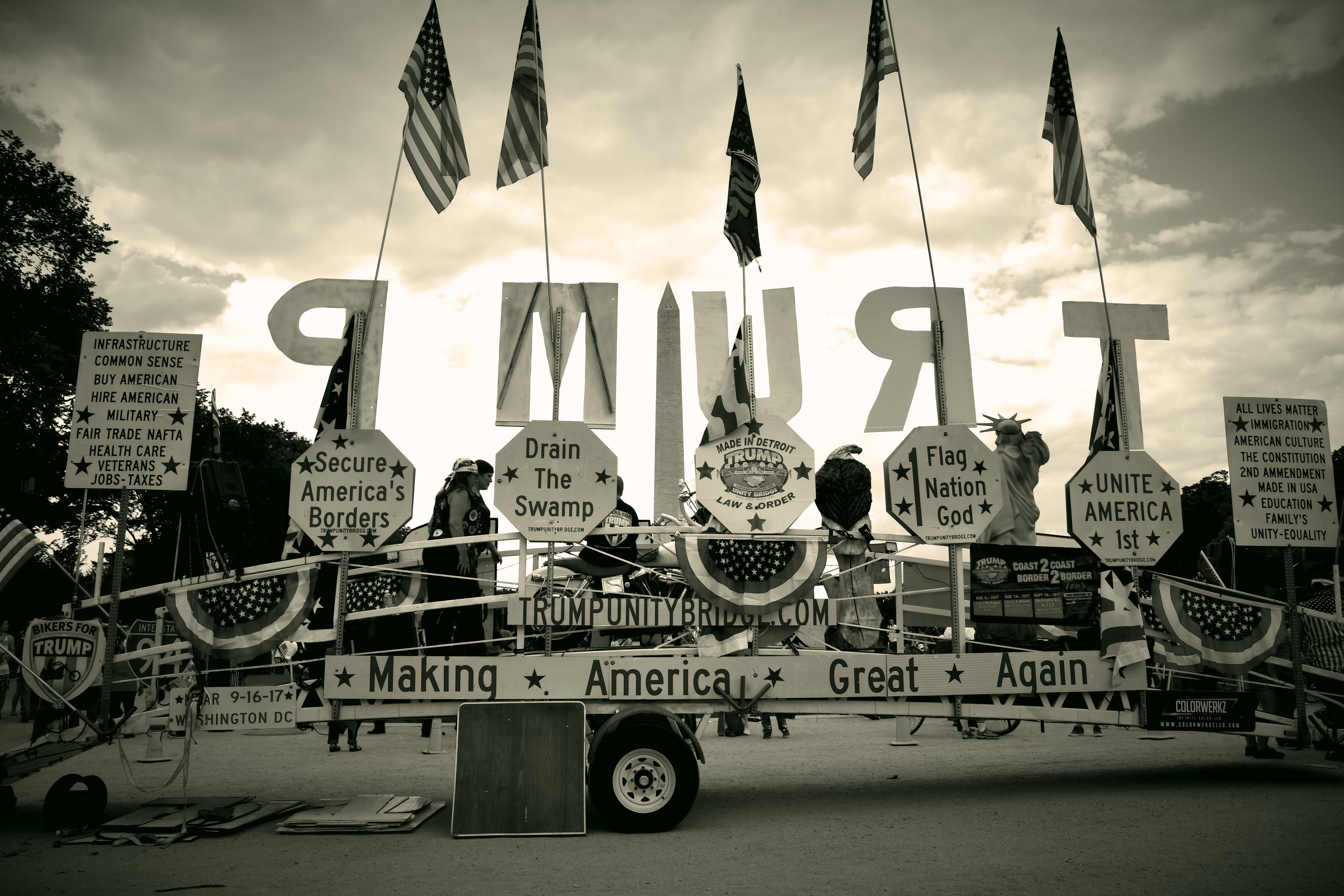
The trailer with the Washington Monument in the background, September 2017

The bridge is 50 feet (15 m) long, over 13 feet (4.0 m) tall, and weighs approximately 9,000 pounds (4,100 kg). To make it road mobile, the bridge was attached to a legally registered motorcycle trailer. It features American flags, signage including six-foot-tall letters spelling "Trump", a carved wooden eagle, and a replica of the Statue of Liberty.

The signs on the bridge include sayings such as "All Lives Matter", "American Culture", "Drain the swamp", "Hire American", and "Secure America's borders".

== History ==
Rob Cortis, a resident of Livonia, Michigan, has owned the bridge since 1985 and originally intended it to be a backdrop for wedding celebrations and photographs. The bridge was stolen from Cortis' Farmington Hills property in December 2014 and recovered in Belleville.

Cortis began driving the pro-Trump trailer in October 2016. He drove 20,000 miles by January 2017, and more than 40,000 miles by August 2017. The float was vandalized in Alexandria, Virginia, en route to the Mother of All Rallies in Washington, D.C.

In March 2019, Cortis interrupted an interfaith vigil in downtown Cleveland, Ohio commemorating the victims of the Christchurch mosque shootings by driving the float past twice while playing loud music.

On November 6, 2020, the float was impounded by Detroit Police for having an invalid license plate, and Cortis was taken into custody because of an outstanding warrant for a charge of disturbing the peace. Police warned him on Wednesday not to return to Detroit, but he did so anyway and was arrested.

On September 22, 2021, the float was involved in a three-vehicle crash in Flint, Michigan. Cortis was driving an ambulance hauling the Unity Bridge back to his home from an event opposing high school mask mandates when he hit another vehicle and spun into a telephone pole. There were no major injuries and there was no damage to the float.

=== Trump tour timeline ===
- October–November 2016: Michigan; Ohio
- December 12, 2016: Cleveland, Ohio
- January 17, 2017: New York City, New York
- January 21, 2017: Washington, D.C., for the inauguration of Donald Trump and 2017 Women's March
- March 2017: Indianapolis, Indiana; Ypsilanti Township, Michigan
- August 16, 2017: North Platte, Nebraska
- August 17, 2017: Lincoln, Nebraska
- August 18, 2017: Iowa City, Iowa
- September 15, 2017: Alexandria, Virginia
- September 16, 2017: Washington, D.C., for the Mother of All Rallies
- May 10, 2018: Elkhart, IN, outside of a Donald Trump and Mike Pence rally at North Side Middle School
- July 13, 2019: Byron, MI, Byron Family Fun Day Parade
- April 15, 2020: Lansing, MI, for Operation Gridlock
- May 18, 2020: Owosso, MI, for an anti-lockdown rally in support of barber and business owner Karl Manke
- August 28, 2020: Stolen and crashed by thief, Tulsa, OK
- September 9, 2020: Alpena, MI.

== See also ==
- Campaign bus
- Mobile billboard
