= Bangin' on Wax 2... The Saga Continues =

Studio album by Bloods & Crips
- Released: September 13, 1994
- Recorded: 1993–1994
- Genre: Gangsta rap, G-Funk
- Length: 74:36
- Label: Dangerous Records
- Producer: Ron "Ronnie Ron" Phillips, Tweedy Bird Loc, Jerome Evans (Silkski)

Bloods & Crips chronology
Bangin' on Wax (1993)	Bangin' on Wax 2... The Saga Continues (1994)	Bangin' on Wax: Greatest Hits (1996)

Singles from Bangin' on Wax 2... The Saga Continues
- 1. "G's & Loc's" Released: 1994; 2. "Wish You Were Here" Released: 1994

Professional ratings
Review scores
Source	Rating
Allmusic	3/5 stars

Bangin' on Wax 2... The Saga Continues is the second and last album by the Bloods & Crips. Music videos were made for G's & Locs and Wish You Were Here.

== Track listing ==
#	Title	Time
1	"Brothers to Brothers"	8:14
2	"G's & Loc's"	3:50
3	"Gangsta Shit"	4:54
4	"Send That Crab Off to Die"	5:41
5	"Mafia Lane"	4:12
6	"Fuck Crab" (Skit)	0:35
7	"Can't Stop, Won't Stop"	4:27
8	"Time Is Gone Nigga"	4:38
9	"Set Trippin'"	5:34
10	"East Side Rip Rider"	4:49
11	"187" (Skit)	0:45
12	"Slob 187"	5:10
13	"Slobs Keep on Slippin'"	4:51
14	"Every Dog Has His Day"	5:23
15	"Crip 4 Life"	6:15
16	"Wish You Were Here"	5:18

== Samples ==
- "G's and Locs"
  - "I Wanna Do Something Freaky to You" by Leon Haywood
- "Mafia Lane"
  - "Mary Jane" by Rick James
- "Time Is Gone Nigga"
  - "Do Your Thing" by Isaac Hayes
- "Every Dog Has His Day"
  - "Got To Be Real" by Cheryl Lynn

== Charts ==
Chart	Peak position
US Billboard 200	139
US Top R&B/Hip-Hop Albums (Billboard)	20

== Trivia ==
- "G's and Locs" has the same beat - albeit slightly modified - as the track "Shuda Beena B-Dog" from the previous album Bangin' on Wax.
