= Mother of All Rallies =

2017 pro-Trump rally in Washington, D.C.

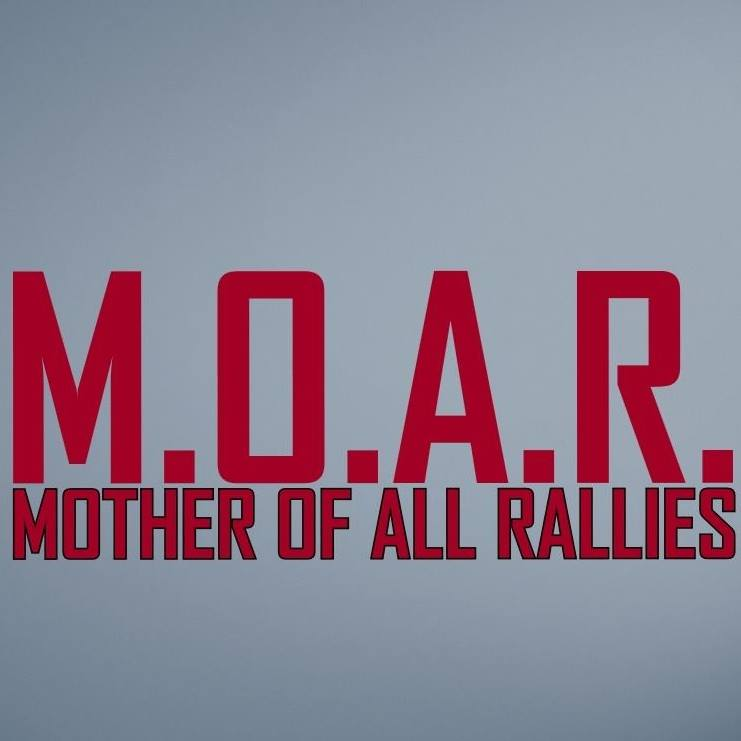
- Promotional artwork used as the rally's Facebook profile image
- Date: September 16, 2017
- Location: Washington, D.C., United States
- Also known as: M.O.A.R.
- Cause: Support of President Donald Trump
- Participants: Several hundred – 1,000
- Website: motherofallrallies.com

The Mother of All Rallies (M.O.A.R.) was a rally held on September 16, 2017, at the National Mall in Washington, D.C., United States, in support of President Donald Trump. The event was held on the same day as other demonstrations throughout the city, including the Juggalo March. Speakers included Marco Gutierrez and the leaders of Gays for Trump and Patriot Prayer, among others. Members of the 3 Percenters, American Guard, Oath Keepers, and Proud Boys were present, as were Antifa and Black Lives Matter activists. Crowd estimates ranged from several hundred to around 1,000 attendees, far less than organizers' original goal of 1 million participants and claims that thousands would attend. No Republican elected officials attended the rally.

== Planning ==
Tommy Hodges (also known as Tommy Gunn) was one of the rally's organizers. The event was billed as "not a left or right rally", and according to The New York Times, was named after the GBU-43/B MOAB, commonly known as the "Mother of All Bombs". Organizers planned to ask attendees with Confederate flags and Nazi symbolism, or hateful signage, to leave or return such belongings to their vehicles. They had a goal of one million participants, and claimed thousands would attend.

Leading up to the event, Boykin told The Washington Post he planned to condemn Deferred Action for Childhood Arrivals, Sharia, and transgender people in military service in his speech. According to The Independent, the Metropolitan Police Department of the District of Columbia expected 1,800 people to attend.

The Mother of All Rallies took place on the same day as more than 30 other events held on federal land in Washington, D.C., including a march organized by fans of the hip-hop duo Insane Clown Posse that was known as the Juggalo March, a small anti-Trump demonstration near the White House, and a protest against white supremacy.

== Participants and activities ==
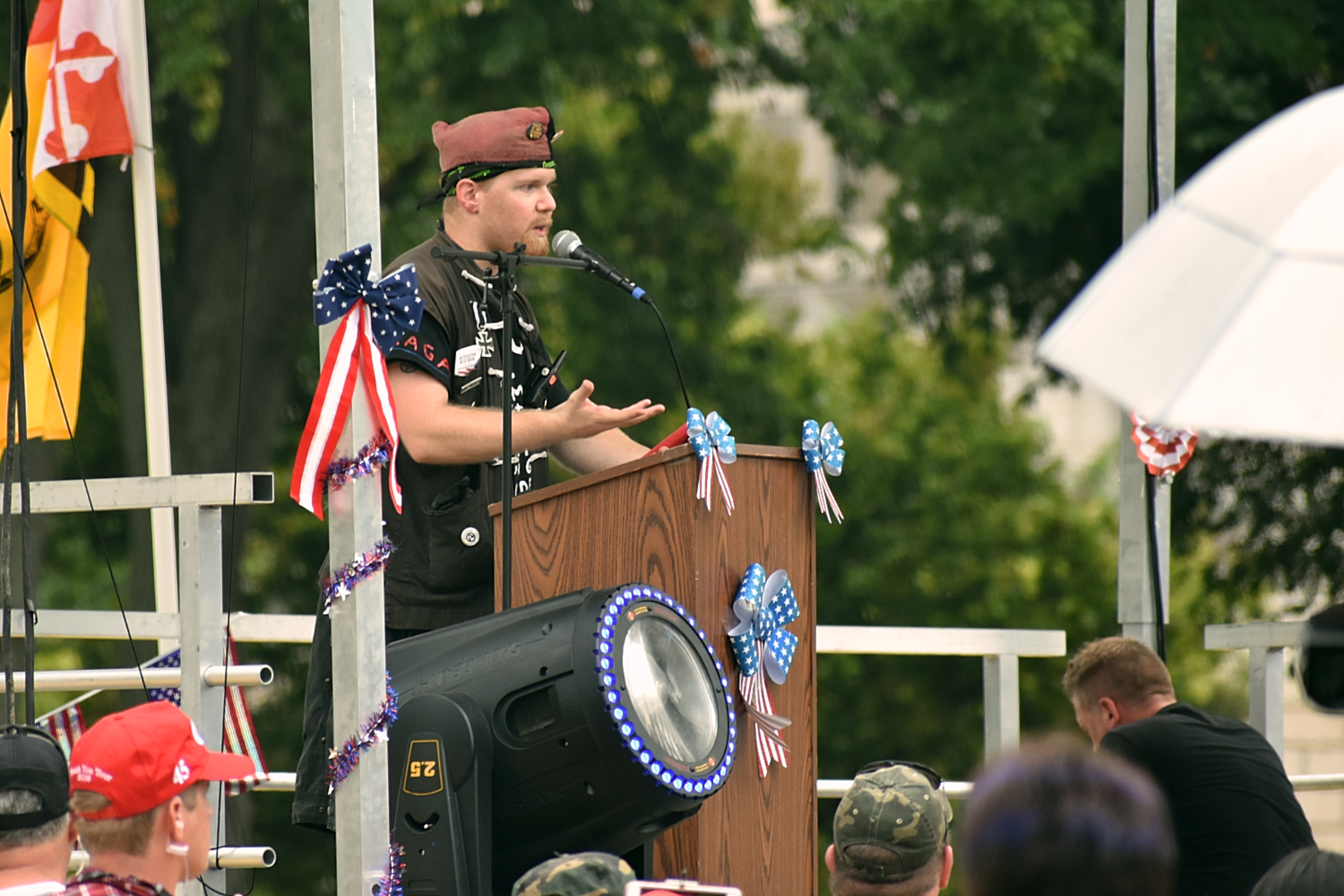
Speaker at the event

Speakers included Peter Boykin of Gays for Trump, Patriot Prayer founder Joey Gibson, Tim Foley of the Arizona Border Recon militia group, Marco Gutierrez of Latinos for Trump, author Hamody Jasim, and Omar Navarro. They reportedly endorsed Trump's Presidential Memorandum for the Secretary of Defense and the Secretary of Homeland Security, which prohibits open military service of transgender individuals, and spoke out against sanctuary cities. Crowd estimates ranged from several hundred to around 1,000 people. The Associated Press reported there were 500 people assembled near the Washington Monument by 1:30pm, and one rally organizer taunted members of the media by inviting them to the stage to film but saying, "I know you don't like to show large pro-Trump crowds". One speaker got attendees to chant "lock her up" in reference to Hillary Clinton, which was often heard at Trump events leading up to the 2016 U.S. presidential election.

Members of the 3 Percenters, American Guard, Oath Keepers, and Proud Boys were present, as was the Trump Unity Bridge. A group of Antifa demonstrators briefly visited the rally; the group was reportedly confronted by regional militia members at the Mother of All Rallies but tensions were reduced by United States Park Police officers. When Black Lives Matter activists gathered near the stage, a Mother of All Rallies organizer invited them to speak from the stage, and said: "It's your right to say whatever you believe, and it's their [the crowd's] right to let you know what they think about what you're saying. The important thing is that everybody has a right to speak their mind." Participants heard the Pledge of Allegiance each hour, and many versions of "The Star-Spangled Banner". No Republican members of Congress or politicians attended the rally.

== Reception ==
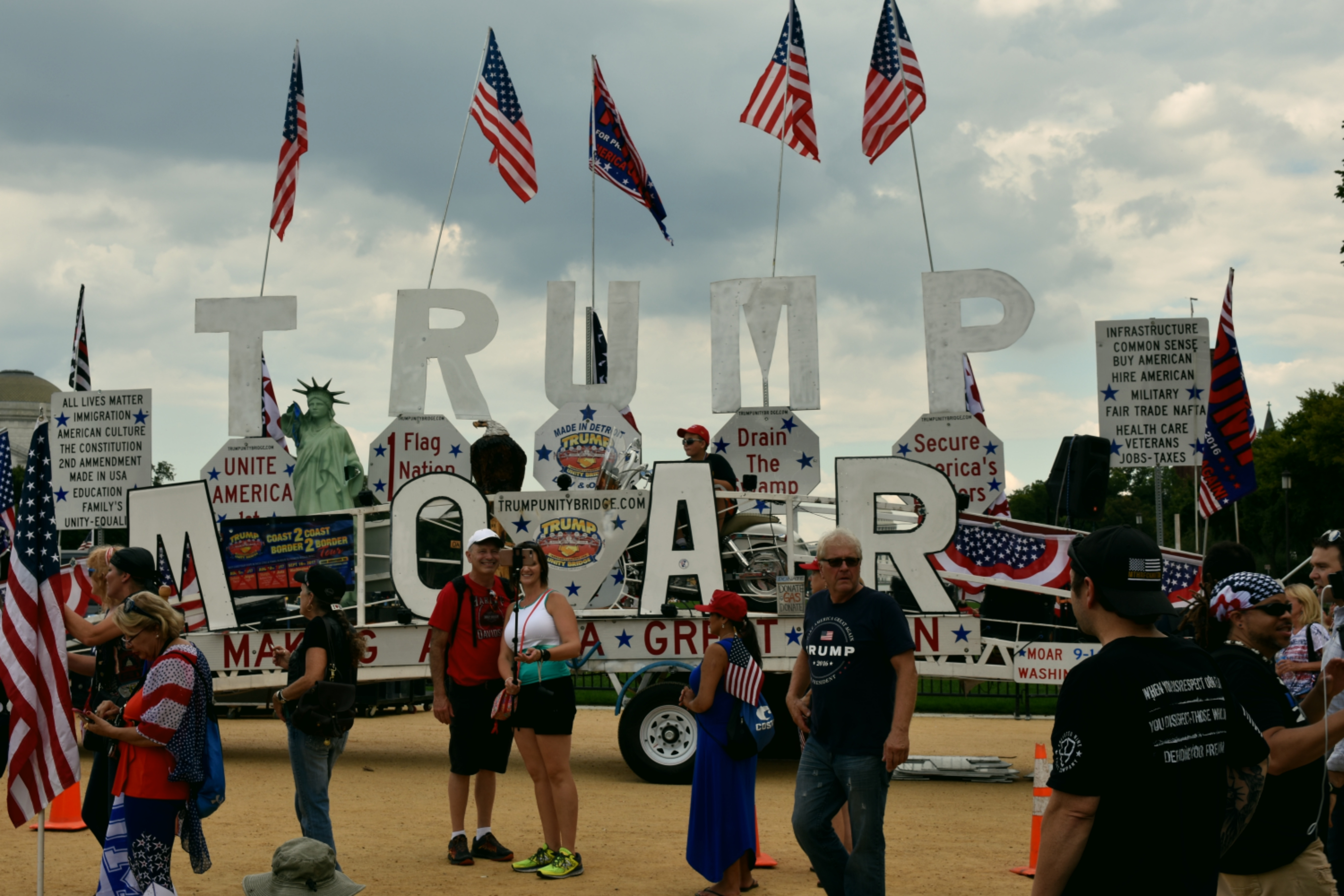
The Trump Unity Bridge at the rally

British newspaper Metro called the rally the "mother of all failures". The New York Times' Emily Baumgaertner said the numerous demonstrations throughout Washington, D.C. "seemed a potentially combustible mix, but clashes were limited to a few harsh words exchanged near some porta-potties, and the city went about its usual business".

In his comparison of the Juggalo March and the March of All Rallies, Adam Gabbatt of The Guardian wrote: "The upbeat, open-minded nature of the Juggalo march, in spite of the reason for it taking place, provided a stark contrast to the Trump event, where people waved anti-communism flags and talked variously about Hillary Clinton's emails, the need to 'take our country back', and craven politicians. The only palpable similarities between the events was that both took place on the national mall and both offered free face-painting – although the stars and stripes designs at the Trump rally differed in style from those of the Insane Clown Posse crowd."

== See also ==
- List of protest marches on Washington, D.C.
