= 187 Ride By =

Studio album by Tweedy Bird Loc
- Released: September 14, 1992
- Recorded: 1991–1992
- Genres: West coast hip hop, gangsta rap, g-funk
- Length: 69:14
- Label: Par
- Producers: Ronnie Phillips, Robert W. Lewis, DJ Battlecat

Tweedy Bird Loc chronology
187 Ride By (1992)	No Holds Barred (1994)

Singles from 187 Ride By
- 1. "Fuck The South Bronx" Released: 1992; 2. "Comin' Out The Cage" Released: 1992

187 Ride By is the debut album of the gangsta rapper Tweedy Bird Loc. It was released on September 14, 1992 via Par Records and produced by Ronnie Ron, Robert W. Lewis and DJ Battlecat.

== Track listing ==
1. "South Bronx Can't Touch Compton (Fuck The South Bronx)" (Tim Dog & KRS-One Diss) (featuring Att Will, Hitman D, Big D-Mark & Nini X) (5:18)
2. "Fu'k Y'all" (intro) (1:03)
3. "What's Really Goin' On" (N.W.A., Tairrie B, The D.O.C, Tim Dog, and D-Nice diss track) (6:11)
4. "My Dick Is Prejudice" (featuring Nini X) (5:03)
5. "Comin' Out The Cage" (featuring Att Will, Hitman D, Notorious Joe, Big D-Mark & Nini X) (4:20)
6. "Who's Makin Love" (intro) (0:47)
7. "Stupid Shit" (4:27)
8. "Hoe Is A Bitch" (H.W.A., Eazy-E, Kokane, and N.W.A diss track) (featuring Nini X) (5:06)
9. "Tweedy's Teed Off" (4:08)
10. "187 Ride By" (featuring Big D-Mark) (3:33)
11. "Punk Motha Fu'ka" (intro) (0:20)
12. "Murder One" (featuring Nini X) (4:23)
13. "Sell Out News Flash" (intro) (0:26)
14. "Takin' Out The Judges" (4:43)
15. "Smoking Chronic" (intro) (1:08)
16. "Compton Blocks" (featuring Geek & Noise) (4:15)
17. "Black Court In Session" (4:05)
18. "Homies Here And Gone" (intro) (1:22)
19. "You Don't Hear Me Though" (4:18)
20. "Jackin' for Transpo" (4:21)

== Samples ==
- "Fuck The South Bronx" samples "Get Up And Get Down" by The Dramatics
- "What's Really Goin On" samples "Back To Life" by Soul II Soul, "Ain't No Future In Yo Frontin'" by MC Breed & "Bitches 2" by Ice-T
- "187 Ride By" samples "Disco To Go" by Brides Of Funkenstein, "Mothership Connection" by Parliament and "Even When You Sleep" by The S.O.S. Band
- "Comin' Out The Cage" samples "Give Up The Funk (Tear The Roof Off The Sucker)" and "Big Bang Theory" by Parliament
- "Hoe Is A Bitch" samples "No Vaseline" by Ice Cube
- "Compton Blocks" samples "Brick House" by The Commodores and "Growin' Up In The Hood" by Compton's Most Wanted
- "You Don't Hear Me Though" samples "Do That Stuff" by Parliament and Trapped by 2Pac
