= Silkski =

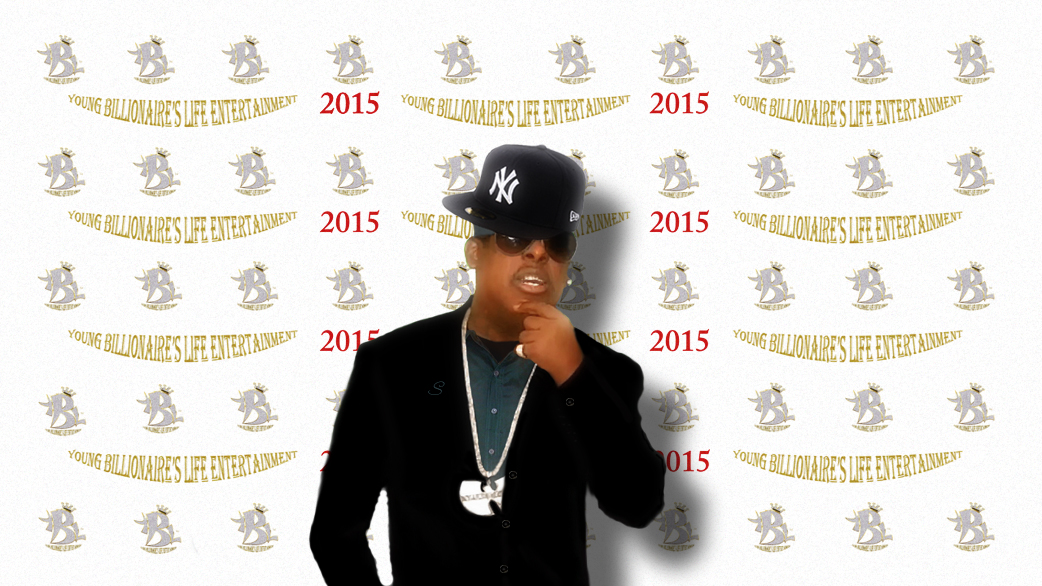
- Silkski

Background information
- Born: Jerome Albert Evans Jr. June 28, 1963
- Origin: Brooklyn, Queens
- Died: October 28, 2016 (aged 53)
- Genres: Hip-hop
- Occupations: Rapper; record producer; songwriter
- Years active: 1988–2016
- Labels: Protect-Ya-Neck Records; Wu Tang Management; Da Gutta Ent; Street Scholar; Bungalo; UMG; Quality; Warlock; Capitol; Geffen; Priority; Def Jam; Milan; PolyGram; Columbia; Death Row; Dangerous; DSX Records; EMI Records

Jerome Albert Evans Jr., known as Silkski, was an American rapper, songwriter, and music producer who is known from his affiliation with Ol' Dirty Bastard (ODB) and the Wu-Tang Clan, whose affiliates are known as the Wu-Tang Killa Beez. Silkski was a member of Brooklyn Zu. Silkski died October 28, 2016.

== Biography ==
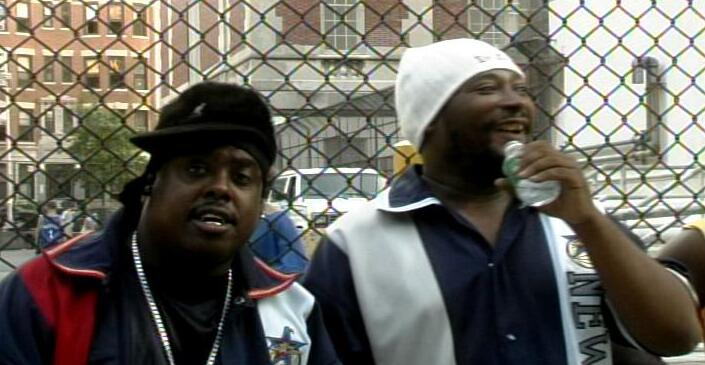
Silkski and ODB

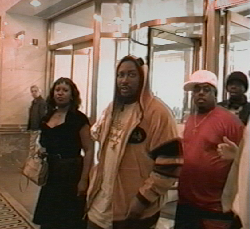
Silkski, ODB and Mother at press conference

While appearing in many Wu-related events, Silkski made appearances on VH1 “Inside out, ODB on Parole”; “The Disciples Of The 36 Chambers” (DVD) concert from ODB's last major Wutang concert July 17, 2004, before ODB's death; “Rock the Bells” movie documentary of the same concert now on DVD; The Wu-Tang Story, and documentary Dirty, One Word Can Change The World; and BET's “Access Granted” with Ghostface and RZA from Ghostface featuring Missy Elliott “Tush” video. Silkski featured on albums, done out of the United States, such as Neplatna Identita Hodne Tvari / Many Faces; 10th Anniversary (CD Collector); and Russia Vs USA “Spy Games” Wu Edition, Compiled By WTCF.

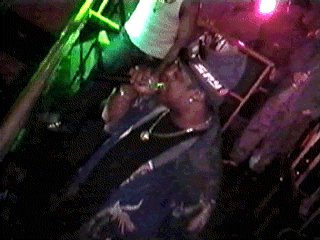
Jerome Evans aka Silkski

In 1995, Silkski performed and produced the song “Techno Boy” for the movie score and soundtrack of the film Copycat. The film grossed $32,051,917 in the United States, and £2,023,443 in the UK. In 1996, Silkski produced the song "Pimp'n Ain't EZ" for the movie and soundtrack of the 1996 animated feature film Beavis and Butt-head Do America, which grossed $20.11 million in its opening weekend, and grossed over $127,118,386 in North American box office sales. Silkski also produced songs that went over platinum on the Bloods & Crips "Bangin' on Wax” albums, as well as an album for Ice-T that went gold.

Silkski family is well connected into the music industry, but that didn't give him his start in the industry. “She (Silkski’s mom) tried to keep me in the nice area”, said Silkski, “but I went the other way.”” As a child Silkski cut school and sneak into the movies in Times Square on 42nd street or Broadway; jump on back of moving commercial trucks to get a tow home; hop the train; and would often Hang ten on the subways that went over 100 miles an hour between stops. On the A train express that went non-stop from 59th Street in mid-town Manhattan to 125th Street and Broadway in Harlem; he would hang off the back of the train on the last car for a thrill ride, holding on to nothing but the door knob with his feet barely touching the platform. With his stunts and rebelliousness, it led to one of the most defining moments in Silkski’s life; his mother turned him over to the state. His mother put him in a group home in Staten Island (Mount Lorreto) “Mission of the Immaculate Virgin”. Eventually, Silkski left the group home and moved in with his cousin who lived in the roughest area of Jamaica Queens. While in Jamaica Queens, Silkski along with others contributed to the negativity of Queens inner city streets. Although he lived in a grimey area, he stood out with his extreme tagging graffiti techniques and style of dancing, which led him to be nicknamed "Kid Boogie". During Silkski's adolescence and preteen years, he was known as the kid with the sleepy eyes. People around him would call him sleepy because his eyes use to droop down or appear as if he was high or falling asleep. But at the age of 12 he decided that he wanted a nickname that sounded cool or slick. He chose the name Silk because older people use to say that he was smooth as silk; because he had the wavy hair, smooth talk, and swagger with the way he dressed. Although he liked the name Slick, he decided to go with Silk because it was cool, sounded slick, and at the time was original. During the early stages of hip hop; b-boys, emcees, d-jays and graffiti artist were giving themselves nicknames with a common tag at the end; which was a letter of the alphabet or something that gave that individual a swagger that represented a form of expression, a character, or alto ego of themselves. At that time, growing up, he would frequently wear ski jackets, ski hats, beanies, and ski goggles, because of the cold weather in New York, which in turn contributed to his persona and ultimately became a part of his name. He put the two words together “Silk and Ski”, and that is what formed the name Silkski.(https://m.imdb.com/name/nm3006221/bio/?ref_=nm_ov_bio_sm).

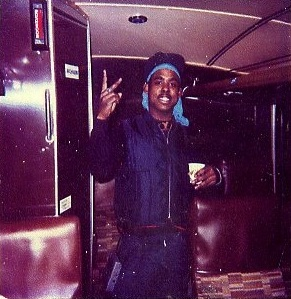
Silkski at age 21

Aside from living in Staten Island and Queens, Silkski lived in Manhattan, Brooklyn, and Harlem. While in Harlem, Silkski connected with B-boy dancer Larry Love of the Zulu Nation who was famous in Harlem for his unique dance known as the Float. As a B-boy, Silkski became known for his unique electric boogie style where he would vibrate his hands, legs, and body. Before Silkski connected with Larry Love, he changed his dance name from "Kid Boogie" to "Gangsta Boogie". Together, Silkski and Larry Love would battle dance different crews throughout the Burroughs of New York. Larry Parker (Larry Love), known for the song "Larry's Dance Theme, by Grandmaster Flash and the Furious Five connected Silkski with the owner of Harlem World. At Harlem World, Silkski met Kurtis Blow. One day while Silkski practiced his dance moves, Kurtis Blow went into the club to set up for a show. Silkski asked Kurtis Blow to watch him dance; and that same night, he was on stage dancing in the show. Although Silkski lived in New York, he also had family in Los Angeles, California. He would travel back and forth, bringing and taking new hip hop trends with him. In Los Angeles, his good friend and cousin, Dougie D, reunited Silkski with Kurtis Blow, which led Kurtis to take Silkski on a 40-city European tour with him. After the tour, Silkski continued to work with Kurtis Blow for a number of years. He danced as a member of his crew, appeared in music videos, was a dee jay at major events, and worked behind the scenes as Kurtis Blow’s producer.

Later in California, Silkski joined Ice-T’s rap group Rhyme Syndicate.

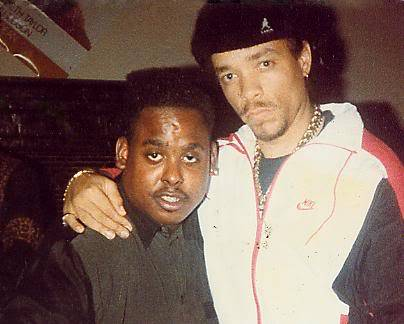
Silkski with Ice T back in the day

He started as a rapper producing his own music, but his beats were considered so good that many artists and record labels wanted him to produce their tracks. He produced songs for the Bloods and Crips’ albums, produced songs for Geffen Records, Def Jam Recordings, PolyGram, Milan Records and was signed to Death Row Records under Char Jones as a producer. While at Death Row Records, at Can-Am Studios in Tarzana, California, he worked with Tupac Shakur, Snoop Dogg, the Lady of Rage, Kurupt and Daz Dillinger from Tha Dogg Pound, and many others until Shakur's untimely death.

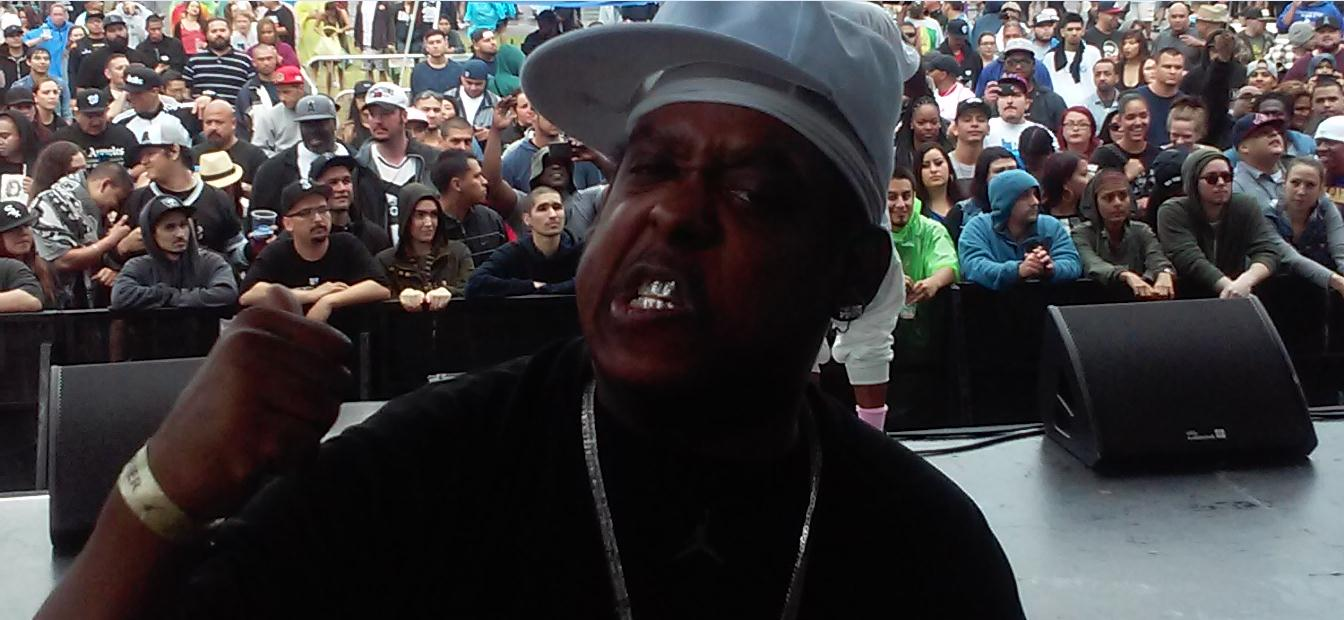
Silkski on stage 2015

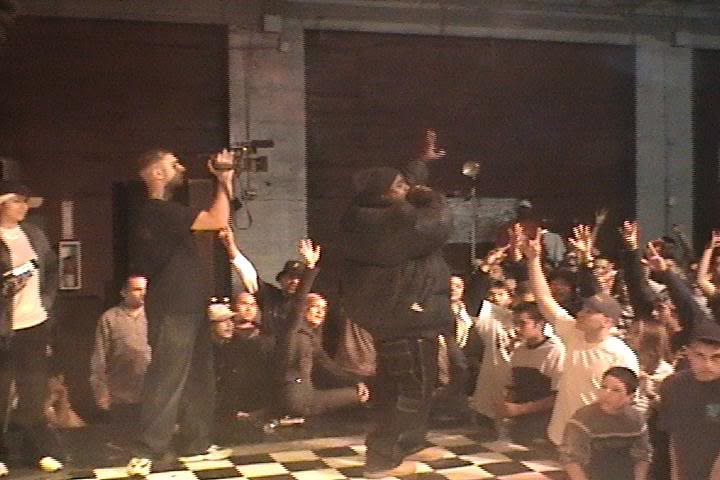
Silkski on stage

== Discography ==
=== Film ===
- Rock the Bells (2006) Denis Hennelly, Casey Suchan
- Disciples Of The 36 Chambers (2004) Wu-Tang Clan
- “Gold Diggin' For Love of Money” A Documentary Film (2009) Brass Ring Enterprises

=== Television ===
- Howard Stern Show (2003) Howard Stern
- Upside Down TV (2003) Johnny Neurotic and Bridget "the Midget" Powerz
- The Roof T.V. (2003) (Telemundo)
- Access Granted "Tush" video Ghostface and Missy Elliott (2004) BET
- Inside out, ODB on Parole (2004) VH1

=== Music ===
Mixtape / Album	Song	Year
Co-Defendants - Criminal Season -Exclusive-	Part Of The Zoo	2012
VA Wu-Brick Presents Wu-World Order Vol. 2	The Hajj	2011
Ice-T's The Final Destination Vol 1 "The Cure"	Tha Cure	2011
Russia vs USA - Spy Games compiled by WTCF	Goodbye Weapons	2011
Co-Defendants - Killa Season	Intro of Silkski	2010
Dj Scarface - The Congregation (Hosted By Cappadonna)	Sista Love (What Happened)	2009
Neplatna Identita - Many Faces	Reloaded; Fake MCS	2009
Shawneci – Killa Angelz	Fist of The Drunken Tiger	2009
Wu-Fam - Myspace Exclusives Vol. 7	Silkski In Paris	2008
Dj Swarm - Wu-Underground Vol. 3	No Money	2006

=== Albums and singles ===
Title	Credit	Label	Year
Alcoholism Single Painkillas (Silkski & Tash) ft. Papa Chief Single	artist	Da Gutta Ent.	2013
Sista Love (What Happened) ft. Cappadonna Single	artist / producer	Bungalo Records, Universal Music Group	2008
Zu-Chronicles, Vol. 2 - Like Father, Like Sonn "Watchin Me"	producer / artist	Duck-Lo Records / Chambermusik	2005
24/8 Tha EP (Strickly For Tha Underground)	producer / artist	Protect-Ya-Neck Records, Wutang Management, DaGutta Entertainment	2003
Tha Don Of All Donz Single	producer / artist	Protect-Ya-Neck Records, Wutang Management, DaGutta Entertainment	2003
No Money Single	producer / artist	Protect-Ya-Neck Records, Wutang Management, DaGutta Entertainment	2003
Bang'n On Wax: The Best Of The Damu's	producer	Quality Records / Warlock Records / Capitol Records	1997
Beavis and Butt-head Do America "Pimpin Aint EZ"	producer	Geffen Records, Paramount Pictures	1996
Madd Head - Tripp2nite (remix)	producer	Geffen Records	1996
Ice T "VI – Return of the Real"	producer	Priority Records	1996
LL Cool J - Ain't Nobody / Madd Head - Pimp'n Ain't Ez Single	producer	Def Jam Recordings	1996
Copycat Soundtrack (Techno Boy)	performer / writer	Milan Records	1995
Raiders of the Lost Art "G-Party" (Kurtis Blow)	Bass, Keyboards, Vocals: Background, Chant	PolyGram, DCC Compact Classics/Sony Music Special Products, Columbia Records	1994
Bang'n On Wax, Vol. 2: The Saga Continues" (Slob 187)	producer	Quality Records / Warlock Records / Capitol Records	1994
NiNi X - She's Dangerous (Take That Mutha F-Cka)	producer	Dangerous Records	1994
No Holds Barred (Tweedy Bird Loc album)(Outta Here)	artist	Quality Records / Warlock Records / Capitol Records	1994
Ronnie Ron* - Gangsta Boom - Sample Your Ass Off	producer	Dangerous Records, Pump Records, Warlock Records	1993
Bang'n On Wax: (C-Sick, K's Up)	producer	Quality Records / Warlock Records / Capitol Records	1993
Silkski Shawborn Featuring Project "X" - Depression "99" / Ya! On A Mission	producer / artist	DSX Records	1989
