= National Gang Intelligence Center =

Agency of the US Department of Justice

The National Gang Intelligence Center (NGIC) is an agency of the US Department of Justice established by the FBI upon order of Congress in 2005. The NGIC is a multi-agency effort that integrates the gang intelligence assets of federal, state, and local law enforcement entities to serve as a centralized intelligence resource for gang information and analytical support.

== See also ==
- Gangs in the United States
  - List of gangs in the United States
- National Drug Intelligence Center (DEA)
