= Bangin' on Wax =

Studio album by Bloods & Crips
- Released: March 9, 1993
- Recorded: 1992–1993
- Genres: West Coast hip hop; gangsta rap
- Length: 71:21
- Label: Dangerous
- Producers: Ronnie Phillips; Tweedy Bird Loc; Jerome Evans (Silkski); Battlecat; David Scott Lindley; Big Qluso; J. Stank

Bloods & Crips chronology
Bangin' on Wax (1993)	Bangin' on Wax 2... The Saga Continues (1994)

Singles from Bangin' on Wax
- 1. "Bangin' on Wax" Released: 1993; 2. "Piru Love" Released: 1993; 3. "Crip, Crip, Crip" Released: 1993; 4. "Steady Dippin'" Released: 1993

Professional ratings
Review scores
Source	Rating
AllMusic	3/5 stars

Bangin' on Wax is the debut album by American hip hop group Bloods & Crips. The album was released in 1993 by Dangerous Records. Bangin' on Wax peaked at No. 86 on the Billboard 200 albums chart. Four singles were released: "Bangin' on Wax", "Piru Love", "Crip, Crip, Crip", and "Steady Dippin'". Music videos were made for "Bangin' on Wax", "Piru Love" and "Steady Dippin'". The album was produced by Ronnie Phillips, DJ Battlecat, Big Qluso, Siilski, Tweedy Bird Loc, and J. Stank. To minimize conflict, Phillips decided to use gang members from geographically separate areas of Los Angeles.

== Track listing ==
No.	Title	Length
1.	"Slob B.K.O."	5:55
2.	"Gangsta Talk" (Intro)	3:10
3.	"Bangin' on Wax"	3:47
4.	"Shuda Beena B-Dog"	3:41
5.	"C-Sick"	4:09
6.	"Rip a Crab in Half"	4:00
7.	"Piru Love"	6:12
8.	"No Way Out"	3:59
9.	"I Killed Ya Dead Homies"	3:33
10.	"C-K Ride"	4:15
11.	"Crippin' Ain't Easy"	5:18
12.	"Crazy Lil' Nigga"	0:18
13.	"Another Slob Bites the Dust"	3:49
14.	"Crip, Crip, Crip"	3:50
15.	"Puttin' in Work"	5:26
16.	"Steady Dippin'"	4:23
17.	"Mackin' to Slob Bitches"	5:51
18.	"K's Up"	4:47
19.	"Bro Dahwood-Transmigrator of the Soul"	0:44

== Samples ==
"Bangin' on Wax"	"More Bounce to the Ounce" "Peanut Butter"	by Zapp & Roger by Twennynine & Lenny White
"Shuda Beena B-Dog"	"I Wanna Do Something Freaky to You"	by Leon Haywood
"Rip a Crab in Half"	"Mothership Connection"	by Parliament
"Piru Love"	"Computer Love"	by Zapp & Roger
"No Way Out"	"Do Your Thing"	by Lyn Collins
"Another Slob Bites the Dust"	"Hollywood Swinging"	by Kool and the Gang
"Crip, Crip, Crip"	"Bounce, Rock, Skate, Roll" “I Can Make You Dance”	by Vaughn Mason & Crew Zapp & Roger

== Charts ==
Chart (1993)	Peak position
US Billboard 200	86
US Top R&B/Hip-Hop Albums (Billboard)	18
