= Bloods & Crips =

American hip hop group

- Origin: Los Angeles County, California, U.S.
- Genres: West Coast hip-hop; gangsta rap; g-funk
- Years active: 1992–1995, 2004
- Labels: Warlock (U.S.); Dangerous (U.S.)
- Past members: Damu Ridas (Bloods); Nationwide Rip Ridaz (Crips)

Bloods & Crips was an American gangsta rap group from Los Angeles County mostly known for their record-selling song "Piru Love".

== History ==
The success of N.W.A. had frustrated many in the gang community who saw the group capitalizing on the gang lifestyle. The Bloods & Crips project was originally organized by rappers O.Y.G Redrum 781 and Tweedy Bird Loc. Actual gang members — Crips from Compton, Watts and Long Beach, and Bloods from Inglewood and Los Angeles — auditioned for the group and the best ones were chosen for the album. In 1993, the Bloods & Crips released their debut album entitled Bangin' on Wax for Warlock Records. One year later, the group's second and final studio album, Bangin' on Wax 2... The Saga Continues was released. After Bangin' on Wax 2, the Bloods & Crips parted ways, with the Bloods becoming the Damu Ridas and the Crips becoming the Nationwide Rip Ridaz.

=== First album ===
Bangin' on Wax was the first album by Bloods & Crips. The album was released in 1993 under Dangerous Records. Bangin' on Wax was a success, making it to No. 86 on the Billboard 200. Four singles were released "Bangin' on Wax", "Piru Love", "Crip, Crip, Crip" and "Steady Dippin'". The album went on to sell over 500,000 copies, achieving Gold status. Official music videos for "Bangin' on Wax", "Piru Love" and "Steady Dippin'" were made, gaining widespread attention for the group.

On the group's single "Piru Love", the hook is sung by Fo' Clips Eclipse, one of the group's Crip members.

The next single, "Steady Dippin'", was performed by Crip members Do Or Die (a.k.a. A-Love), Miss C-Note (a.k.a. Dannygirl), Sin Loc, and Blue Ragg (a.k.a. The General). They emerged as a group called the Underworld Connection. The Underworld Connection was formed in the early 1990s but was put on hold for projects like Tweedy Bird Loc's "187 Ride By" and the controversial album Bangin' On Wax. It was the first time the group reconnected in the late 2000s since the 1990s. Also DJ Battlecat made an appearance in the "Steady Dippin'" music video as the event's DJ for the intro. The song was produced by him along with QLuso and Ronnie Ron.

=== Second album ===
Bangin' on Wax 2... The Saga Continues was the second and last album by the Bloods & Crips. Music videos were made for the album singles "G's & Locs" and "Wish You Were Here". Both videos gained positive reviews. The album was recorded and released in 1994 under Dangerous Records. The album made it to No. 139 on the Billboard 200 and #20 for Top R&B/Hip-Hop Albums.

=== Third album ===
A third album: Bangin’ on Wax Part 3: No Passes was originally recorded in 2004, but not released until 2014. Only a few of the original artists are featured on the album, although it was still distributed through Dangerous Records with the help of Tweedy Bird Loc, following the death of producer Ronnie M. Phillips on November 1, 2003, over a decade prior to release.

== Aftermath ==
Following the end of the project, the two gangs started separate projects, with the Crips releasing albums under the Nationwide Rip Ridaz name, and the Bloods under the Damu Ridas.

=== Nationwide Rip Ridaz ===
The Nationwide Rip Ridaz released two albums, the self-titled Nationwide Rip Ridaz in 1995 and Betrayed (Can't Trust Nobody) in 1999.

A notable member of the group was Donald “AWOL” Levell Stallworth (Born February 15th, 1976) from Kelly Park, he was also an active member of the Kelly Park Compton Crips who was killed by law enforcement on July 4, 1997. Big Freeze, who was a member of the Watts Franklin Square Crips, was killed in 1999.

=== Damu Ridas ===
Damu Ridas released their own self-titled album Damu Ridas in 1995, followed by How Deep Is Your Hood in 1999.

The core members of the Damu Ridas were from two different Blood gangs: the L.A. Denver Lane Bloods and the Crenshaw Mafia Bloods. The two gangs have been close allies for decades and are still allied today.

B-Brazy, Peanut II and Lil' Laniak II were from the Denver Lanes. Tip Toe, Pimp D, Spyder, O.G Mad Eye, Big Hawk and Lil' Hawk were from the Crenshaw Mafia. Of those 9 members, 7 have been confirmed deceased.

B-Brazy was shot and killed in a set up in 2003. Peanut II was shot 17 times and died in November 1995 by members of the Crips. Lil' Laniak II was with his daughter when he was killed around 1995 by the 83 Gangsters. Tip Toe was killed by a member of the Neighborhood Piru. Spyder was in the neighborhood of the Rollin' 60 Crips when he was shot and killed in 2000. O.G Mad Eye and his little brother Lil' Mad Eye were both killed before 2001. Green Eyez died due to health problems. Big Hawk is deceased and Lil' Hawk was serving a 25 to life prison sentence for murder but was released on parole.

== Members ==
- 8 Ball
- Ahmed Younes a.k.a. Lefty
- 031AK Juice
- AWOL (Donald Stallworth)
- Baby Hawk
- Baby Maniak
- Baby Stretch
- BabyMak
- Blaze
- B-Brazy
- B.G. Scarface
- Big Freeze
- Big FM
- Big Hawk
- Biggy Mad-Eyez
- Big Stretch
- Big Wy (Red Rag)
- Bloody Mary (Rajni Faulks)
- Blue Ragg
- Breo
- Broncoe
- Boot
- Cixx Pac
- DeathRow
- Domino
- Findas
- Fo' Clips
- FroLo
- Gangsta Red
- Gangsta Yank
- G-Len
- Green AK
- Green Eyez
- G-Spyder
- June Dawg
- Knots
- Koolay
- Lady S
- Lil’ 8
- Lil' CK Stretch
- Lil' Leak (CK)
- Lil' Hawk (Bobby Williams)
- Lil' Ms. Chyna
- Miss C-Note
- Moe-B
- Ms. Bonnie
- O.Y.G Redrum 781
- Peanut I
- Peanut II
- Popa Smurf
- Pops
- Quiet Storm
- Robert W. Lewis III (Producer)
- Saif Salama a.k.a. Big S
- Samari Doby (Lil' Stretch)
- Sin Loc
- Lil’ SlepRock
- $car
- Scratch
- Smile
- $pazzG
- $qeakz4k0
- Storm
- Tip-Toe
- Toto
- Tweedy Bird Loc
- Twin Loc (O.G. Cell-E-Cel)
- Vixen
- Witeout

== Discography ==
=== Bloods & Crips ===
- Bangin' on Wax (1993)
- Bangin' on Wax 2... The Saga Continues (1994)
- Bang'n on Wax: The Best of the Crips, Compilation album (1997)
- Bangin’ on Wax Part 3: No Passes (2014)

=== Damu Ridas ===
- Damu Ridas (1995)
- Bang'n on Wax: The Best of the Damu's, Compilation album (1997)
- How Deep Is Your Hood (1998)

=== Nationwide Rip Ridaz ===
- Nationwide Rip Ridaz (1995)
- Betrayed (Can't Trust Nobody) (1999)

== See also ==
- Crime in Los Angeles
