= Tweedy Bird Loc =

American rapper (1967–2020)

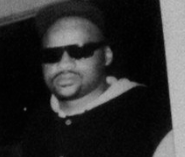

Background information
- Also known as: Tweedy Bird; Gangsta Tweed; Blood Killa
- Born: Richard Johnson; August 4, 1967; Compton, California, U.S.
- Died: April 3, 2020 (aged 52) Compton, California, U.S.
- Genres: Hip hop
- Occupations: Rapper; record producer
- Instrument: Vocals
- Years active: 1992–2020
- Label: Dangerous Records
- Formerly of: Bloods & Crips

Richard Johnson, better known by his stage name Tweedy Bird Loc, was an American rapper. Johnson and producer Ronnie M. Phillips organized the hip-hop project Bloods & Crips, a collaboration between members of the California-based Bloods and Crips street gangs. Johnson was himself affiliated with the Kelly Park Compton Crips.

== Early life ==
Richard Johnson went to Manuel Dominguez High School and was childhood friends with Eazy-E and MC Ren before he had rap rivalries with them.

== Career ==
=== 187 Ride By ===
Tweedy Bird Loc, with the help of producer Ronnie Phillips, began recording his solo debut album 187 Ride By in 1992. He was now beefing with Eazy-E and MC Ren at the time; because when Tweedy Bird Loc overheard Eazy on an interview saying that he won't sign Tweedy Bird Loc to Ruthless, Tweedy felt very disrespected so he and his fellow rappers Big D Mark, Nini X and Notorious Joe wrote a vicious diss track aimed at Eazy, his manager Jerry Heller, and his protegee Kokane titled "Hoe is a Bitch" in which he attacks and criticizes Eazy of selling out, being sexist towards women, and from Tweed's point of view, brown-nosing his manager Jerry Heller for fame. "Hoe is a Bitch" would eventually be recorded on 187 Ride By. Eazy-E never responded to the track. Tweedy Bird Loc also aggressively insults the all female hip hop group H.W.A. who were affiliated with Eazy at the time. Kokane and H.W.A. never responded to the track either.

Tweedy dissed MC Ren in 187 Ride By on the track "What's Really Goin' On", and MC Ren responded in 1993 with his disstrack named "One False Move" on his album Shock of the Hour. The song "What's Really Goin' On" also dissed former N.W.A members Dr. Dre and DJ Yella, Tweedy in the third verse claimed Dre of beating up Dee Barnes and wearing female outfits with Yella, although Yella didn't respond Dre did, with his song "Puffin' on Blunts And Drankin' Tanqueray" from his 1993 single Fuck wit Dre Day (And Everybody's Celebratin') from his solo debut album The Chronic.

Tweedy was also having a feud with Bronx MC Tim Dog for dissing Tweedy's city and the West Coast hip hop scene in general on his single Fuck Compton. Tweedy would eventually respond to this with his single "Fuck The South Bronx" (also a diss aimed at other East Coast rappers such as KRS-One and D-Nice) on the other song "What's Really Goin' On". Tweedy Bird Loc also had a single from 187 Ride By called "Comin' Out The Cage". 187 Ride By was released officially on September 14, 1992.

Besides being a solo rapper, Tweedy was also a producer. He and Ronnie Phillips organized the project Bloods & Crips, a collaboration of gangsta rappers who are members of the gangs, Bloods and Crips. Tweedy produced Bloods & Crips' debut release, Bangin' on Wax in 1993.

=== No Holds Barred ===
Tweedy Bird Loc started working on his second and last solo album, No Holds Barred in 1994. The album spawned his new single "Walk That Walk". This album had more commercial success than his previous '187 Ride By' album. Tweedy also had a television interview live from Compton.

Tweedy released another diss targeted at Ruthless Records and Eazy-E from No Holds Barred entitled "Y'all Can't Fucc With Us". He also disses MC Ren on the track.

Tweedy also dissed Miami rapper and 2 Live Crew member Luke Campbell on this album in response to his west coast diss song "Cowards In Compton". Tweedy responded with his own song, "Fucc Miami". The main reason Tweedy dissed Luke was because Luke dissed his city, although "Cowards In Compton" was not actually aimed at Dangerous Records or Tweedy—Luke targeted the song at Dr. Dre and Snoop Dogg as revenge for being dissed by the duo on Dre's song "Fuck wit Dre Day (And Everybody's Celebratin')" on The Chronic. In early 1995, before Eazy-E's death from AIDS, Tweedy and Eazy-E ended their feud. The posthumous Eazy-E song "Ole School Shit" initially contained a diss verse towards Tweedy ridiculing him for his unsuccessful rap career, but it was removed in post production by DJ Yella.

== Death ==
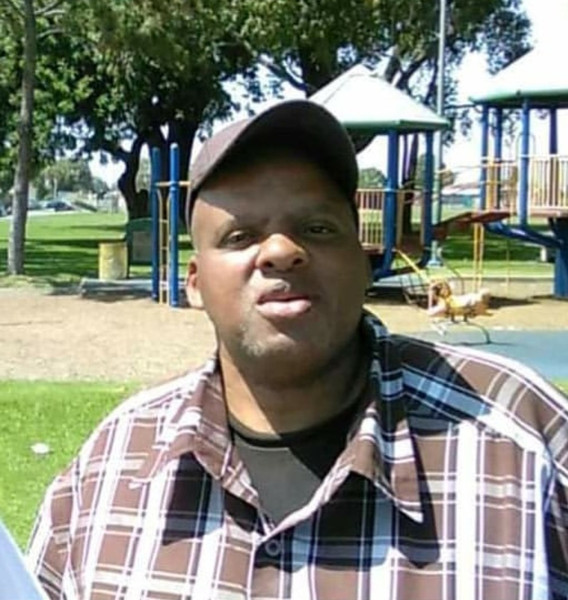
Richard in 2020, months before he passed away.

Johnson died in April 3, 2020. One report said he died of heart or health complications.

== Discography ==
=== Solo albums ===
- 187 Ride By (1992)
- No Holds Barred (1994)

=== Solo singles ===
Year	Title	Album
1992	"Fuck The South Bronx"	187 Ride By
1992	"Comin' Out The Cage"	187 Ride By
1994	"Walk That Walk"	No Holds Barred
