= Regium =

Regium may refer to:

- Reggio Calabria, town in Calabria, Italy; Latin name Regium
- Reggio Emilia, town in Emilia, Italy; Latin name Regium
- Regium Donum, an annual grant formerly voted by Parliament to augment the stipends of the Presbyterian clergy in Ireland
- Collegium Regium (disambiguation), Latin for King's College or Royal College

== See also ==
- Regis (disambiguation) (Latin "of the king")
- Regius (disambiguation) (Latin "royal" masculine adjective)
- Regia (disambiguation) (Latin "royal" feminine adjective)
- Regnum (disambiguation) (Latin for "kingdom", see e.g. Kingdom (biology))
