= Regis (given name) =

- Gender: Male

Origin
- Origin: Occitan
- Meaning: King

Regis or Régis is a given name. Notable persons with that given name include:

- Régis (footballer, born 1965), full name Reginaldo Paes Leme Ferreira, Brazilian footballer
- Régis Amarante Lima de Quadros (born 1976), Brazilian association football player
- Regis J. Armstrong, American Roman Catholic priest and professor
- Régis Avila (born 1962), Brazilian fencer
- Régis Barailla (1933–2016), French politician
- Régis Blachère, French orientalist
- Régis Bonissent (born 1948), French fencer
- Régis Boyer (1932–2017), French scholar
- Regis Louise Boyle (1912–2007), American educator
- Regis Brodie (born 1942), American Professor of Art and potter
- Régis Brouard (born 1967), French association football player
- Régis Campo (born 1968), French composer
- Regis Canevin (1853–1927), American Roman Catholic prelate
- Regis Chakabva (born 1987), Zimbabwean cricketer
- Régis Clère (born 1956), French road bicycle racer
- Regis Cordic (1926–1999), American radio personality and actor
- Régis Debray (born 1941), French intellectual, journalist and politician
- Régis Delépine (born 1946), French road bicycle racer
- Régis Dericquebourg (born 1947), French sociologist
- Régis de l'Estourbeillon (1858–1946), French aristocrat and politician
- Régis de Oliveira (born 1944), Brazilian politician
- Regis de Souza (born 1982), Brazilian association footballer
- Régis de Trobriand (1816–1897), French aristocrat, lawyer, poet and novelist
- Régis Dorn (born 1979), French association football player
- Regis Felisberto Masarim (born 1973), Brazilian football player
- Regis Fernandes Silva (born 1976), Brazilian association football player
- Régis Fuchs (born 1970), Swiss ice hockey winger
- Régis Genaux (1973–2008), Belgian association football player
- Régis Ghesquière (born 1949), Belgian decathlete
- Regis Ghezelbash (born 1951), Iranian-French film director
- Régis Gurtner (born 1986), French association football player
- Régis François Gignoux (1816–1882), French painter
- Régis Gizavo, Malagasy accordionist
- Regis Gurtner (born 1986), French football goalkeeper
- Régis Jauffret, French writer
- Régis Jolivet (1891–1966), French philosopher and Roman Catholic priest
- Régis Juanico (born 1972), member of the National Assembly of France
- Regis B. Kelly, Scottish neuroscientist and university administrator
- Regis "Pep" Kelly (1914–1990), Canadian ice hockey player
- Régis Kittler (born 1979), French football player
- Régis Koundjia (born 1983), former Central African Republic basketball player
- Régis Labeaume (born 1956), Canadian businessman and writer
- Régis Laconi (born 1975), French motorcycle racer
- Régis Laguesse (born 1950), French association football player and coach
- Régis Laspalès (born 1957), French comedian and actor
- Régis Le Sommier (born 1969), French journalist
- Regis Leheny (1908–1976), American baseball pitcher
- Régis Loisel (born 1951), French comics writer and artist
- Regis Malady (1917–1985), American politician from Pennsylvania
- Regis McKenna, American marketing entrepreneur
- Régis Messac (1893–1945), French writer
- Regis Monahan (1908–1979), American football player
- Regis Philbin (1931–2020), American television personality
- Regis Pitbull (born 1976), Brazilian association football player
- Regis Henri Post (1870–1944), New York politician and Governor of Puerto Rico
- Régis Racine (born 1970), French basketball player
- Régis Rey (born 1929), French ski jumper
- Régis Rothenbühler (born 1970), Swiss association football player
- Régis Schleicher (born 1957), French anarchist
- Régis Sénac, French fencer and instructor
- Régis Simon (born 1958), French road bicycle racer
- Victor Maria Regis "Vico" Sotto (born 1989), Filipino politician
- Regis Deon Thomas (born 1970), American convicted murderer on death row in California
- Regis Toomey (1898–1991), American actor
- Régis Wargnier (born 1948), French film director, producer, screenwriter, actor and film score composer

== See also ==
- Regis (disambiguation)
