= Regis =

Regis or Régis may refer to:

== People ==
- Regis (given name), a given name (including a list of people with the name)
- Regis (surname), a surname (including a list of people with the name)
- Regis (musician), full name Karl O'Connor, an English electronic music and techno DJ
- Régis (footballer, born 1965), full name Reginaldo Paes Leme Ferreira, Brazilian football goalkeeper
- Régis (footballer, born 1976), full name Régis Amarante Lima de Quadros, Brazilian football manager and former centre-back
- Régis (footballer, born June 1989), full name Régis Ribeiro de Souza, Brazilian football right-back
- Régis (footballer, born November 1989), full name Régis dos Santos Silva, Brazilian football defensive midfielder
- Régis (footballer, born 1992), full name Régis Augusto Salmazzo, Brazilian football attacking midfielder
- Régis (footballer, born 1998), full name Régis Tosatti Giacomin, Brazilian football forward

== Education ==
- Regis College (Massachusetts) (town of Weston), United States
- Regis College, Toronto, Ontario, Canada
- Regis School (disambiguation), several schools
- Regis High School (disambiguation), several schools
- Regis University, Denver, Colorado, United States

== Places ==
- Regis (place), an English toponym for places with a Royal connection
- Regis, Denver, a neighborhood in Denver, Colorado, United States

== Other uses ==
- Regis (The Witcher), a fictional character in The Witcher novels and adaptations
- ReGIS, a Remote Graphic Instruction Set used on video terminals produced by Digital Equipment Corporation
- Regis Corporation, a hair salon chain
- The REGIS Mark V, a villain on the cartoon show Megas XLR
- Regis, a character in R. A. Salvatore's Forgotten Realms novels and one of the Companions of the Hall
- USS Regis II (SP-1083), a United States Navy patrol boat in commission from 1917 to 1919

== See also ==
- Saint Regis (disambiguation)
- Regi (disambiguation)
- Regia (disambiguation)
- Regius (disambiguation)
- IWG, a serviced office accommodation company that previously traded as Regus
