= Regia (disambiguation) =

The Regia was a structure in the Forum of Ancient Rome, originally the residence of the Kings. Regia may also refer to:

Latin

- Aqua regia, mixture of concentrated nitric acid and concentrated hydrochloric acid
- Regia Anglorum, British medieval reenactment organisation
- Bulla Regia, former Roman city near modern Jendouba, Tunisia
- Editio Regia, third and the most important edition of the Greek New Testament of Robert Estienne
- Via Regia, "King's Highway"
- "Vivas Schola Regia", song of the Royal High School of Edinburgh.
- Regia, a classical type of building.

Italian

- Regia Marina, "Royal Navy" 1861-1946
- Regia Aeronautica, "Royal Air Force" 1923-46
- Scala Regia, "Royal Staircase"
- Sala Regia (disambiguation), "Regal Room or Hall"

Spanish

- Fuerza Regia, Mexican professional basketball team based in Monterrey

== See also ==
- Regis (disambiguation) (Latin "of the king")
- Regius (disambiguation) (Latin "royal" masculine adjective)
- Regium (disambiguation) (Latin "royal" neuter adjective)
