= Lolita Files =

American novelist

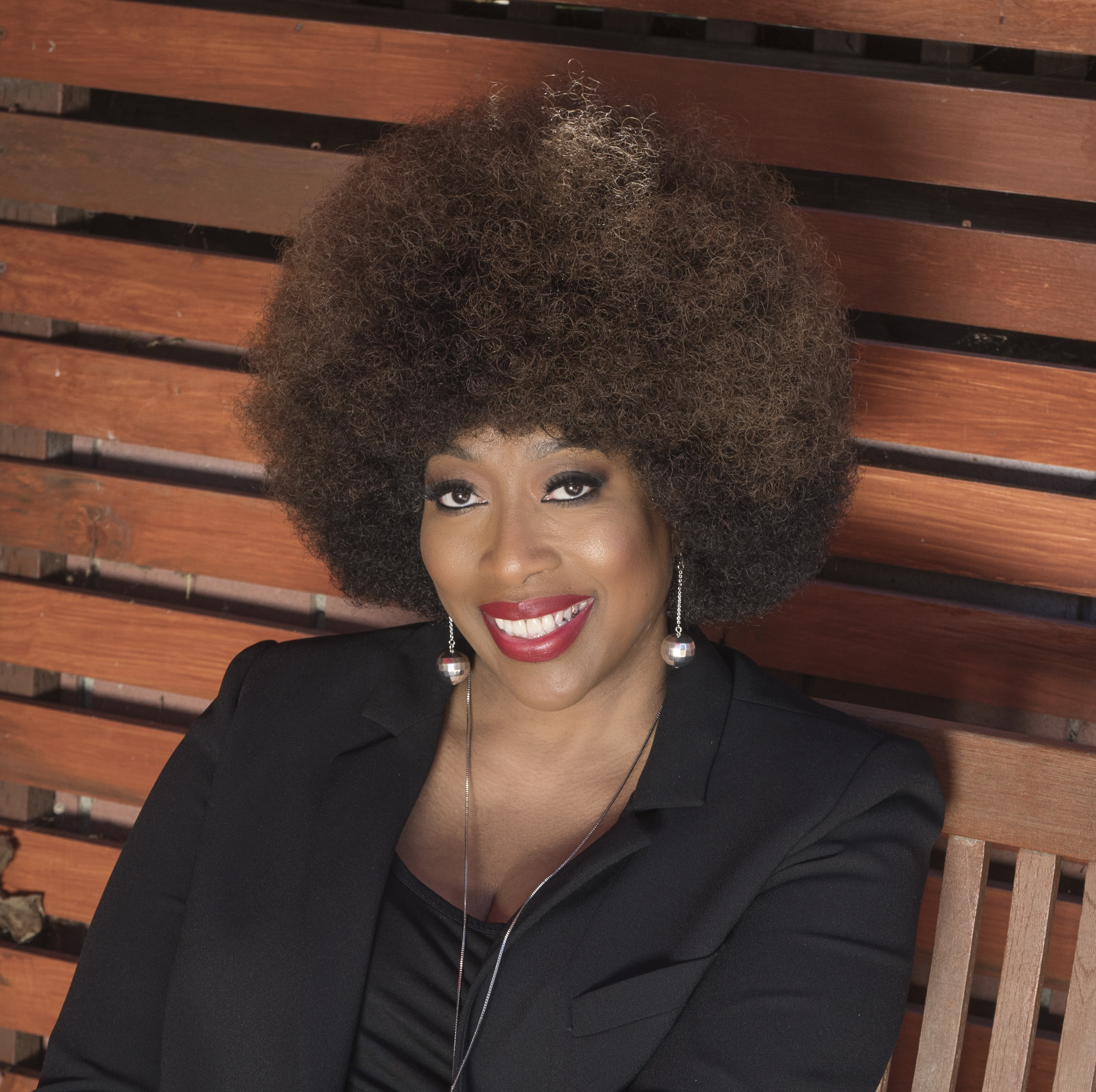
- Born: Fort Lauderdale, Florida, U.S.
- Education: University of Florida (BS)
- Occupations: Author; Screenwriter; Producer
- Years active: 1997–present
- Website: www.lolitafiles.com

Lolita Files is an American author, screenwriter, and producer. Among her six bestselling novels are book club favorites Scenes from a Sistah and Child of God. Her sixth novel, sex.lies.murder.fame was optioned for film by Carolyn Folks for Entertainment Studios with Files adapting the screenplay.

The book Once Upon A Time In Compton, by former Compton Gang Unit Detectives Timothy M. Brennan and Robert Ladd, along with Files, about Brennan and Ladd's years in the gang unit, the rise of Gangsta rap, gang wars, the L.A. riots, the investigations of the murders of rappers Tupac Shakur and The Notorious B.I.G., and the fall of the Compton Police Department was published on April 25, 2017.

Files has a degree in Broadcast Journalism from the University of Florida and is a member of Alpha Kappa Alpha sorority.

Files lives in Los Angeles, where she writes novels, nonfiction, and writes and produces projects for television, film, and new media.

== Early life and education ==
Lolita Files was born in Fort Lauderdale, FL, to Lillie (née Brackett) (d. 2008) and Arthur James Files, Sr. (d. 1999), She was named by her mother after the Stanley Kubrick film Lolita. She has one older sibling, Arthur James Files, Jr.

An avid reader from an early age, she was heavily immersed in mythology (Greek mythology, Roman mythology, Norse mythology, Arthurian legend), Dante's Divine Comedy, and the works of J. R. R. Tolkien. Her love of Shakespeare, Toni Morrison, Fyodor Dostoyevsky, Zora Neale Hurston, Louise Meriwether, Vladimir Nabokov, Chinua Achebe, Claude Brown, Richard Wright, Gustav Flaubert, and Greek playwrights Sophocles, Aeschylus, Euripides, and Aristophanes would inform and influence much of her work.

Files graduated from Dillard High School with seven scholarships and attended the University of Florida at Gainesville. She briefly worked as a stringer for the student newspaper, The Independent Florida Alligator, was a member of the University of Florida Gospel Choir, and pledged Alpha Kappa Alpha sorority (Iota Lambda chapter). In her senior year, she was a Senator representing the College of Journalism and Communications in UF's Student Senate.

== Career ==
After graduating with a Bachelor of Science degree in Broadcast Journalism, Files returned to Fort Lauderdale, working as a marketing manager for a pharmaceutical company and as a regional property coordinator for Great Atlantic Property Management, a real estate management company based out of Newport News, VA with commercial and residential properties that spanned the Eastern Seaboard and parts of the Midwest. Her experience with the world of property management would later inform her first two novels, Scenes from a Sistah (1997), and its followup, Getting To The Good Part (1999).

From 1992 to 1996, Files was the National Communications Manager for the Facilities Management division of KinderCare Learning Centers, the nation's largest provider of for-profit child care and early childhood education, then based in Montgomery, AL.

=== Writing ===
In the fall of 1994, Files overnighted two comedic short stories and fifty pages of Child of God, a dramatic novel she'd been sporadically working on for five years, to literary agency Jay Garon-Brooke Associates, Inc., the agency that represented bestselling author John Grisham. In her query letter, Files stated she had eight more short stories that went with the two she sent.

Nancy Coffey, an agent from Garon-Brooke, called the next morning requesting to see the rest of the material. A week later, Files was signed by the agency.

"Her voice just leapt off the page," Coffey told the Miami Herald. "It was fresh, uplifting and funny."

=== Scenes From A Sistah and Child of God ===
After signing with Garon-Brooke, while working on completing Child of God, Files began writing another novel, Scenes from a Sistah, completing the first draft in seven days. In February 1996, Warner Books purchased Scenes for an advance of $50,000.

"It's a Cinderella story," says Caryn Karmatz Rudy, Files' editor at Warner Books. "Most often, you hear about people writing and getting a zillion rejections. But Lolita writes this book, sends it to the agency of the most successful writer in the country, and they take it. Then, we publish it. That's not your typical story."

In April 1996, Files left Corporate America for a full-time career as a writer. Scenes from a Sistah debuted a year later in April 1997 and was an instant hit, quickly selling out of its first printing and landing on several bestseller lists.

"Child of God" was published in September 2001, after the release of Scenes sequel Getting to the Good Part in 1999 and Blind Ambitions, in 2000.

=== HodgePodge ===
The short stories that helped Files get signed by the Garon-Brooke literary agency were expanded into HodgePodge, a novel including several characters who feature prominently in the Scenes trilogy (Scenes from a Sistah, Getting to the Good Part, and Tastes Like Chicken). To-date, Files has not chosen to publish the book.

=== Off Broadway ===
In 1998, Files appeared in the play "Sisters Who Get Everything Without Giving Up Anything" at the Homefront Theatre, playing lead character Rea Montgomery.

=== Shakespeare's Hamlet vs Files' Child of God ===
SUNY Empire State College offers an eight-week course, "Exploring The Disciplines: Literature (EDU-232072)," centered around the examination of Shakespeare's Hamlet and Lolita Files' novel, Child of God.

Per the course description:

"Both texts include a similar story-line: a murder, an incestuous relationship, an uneasy resolution at the end. By exploring these texts written over 300 years apart, students will learn about the types of themes, questions, comparisons and insights that literature has to offer."

=== Who Killed Tupac? television docuseries ===
Files produced and appears as an investigator for A&E's six-part limited series Who Killed Tupac? In the series, civil rights attorney Benjamin Crump leads an in-depth investigation into the unsolved murder of hip-hop artist Tupac Shakur.

== Personal life ==
In December 2012, Files took a genealogical DNA test through lineage tracing company African Ancestry. Results came back revealing a direct link of Files' maternal ancestry to the Brame and Balanta people of Guinea-Bissau in West Africa.

== Bibliography ==
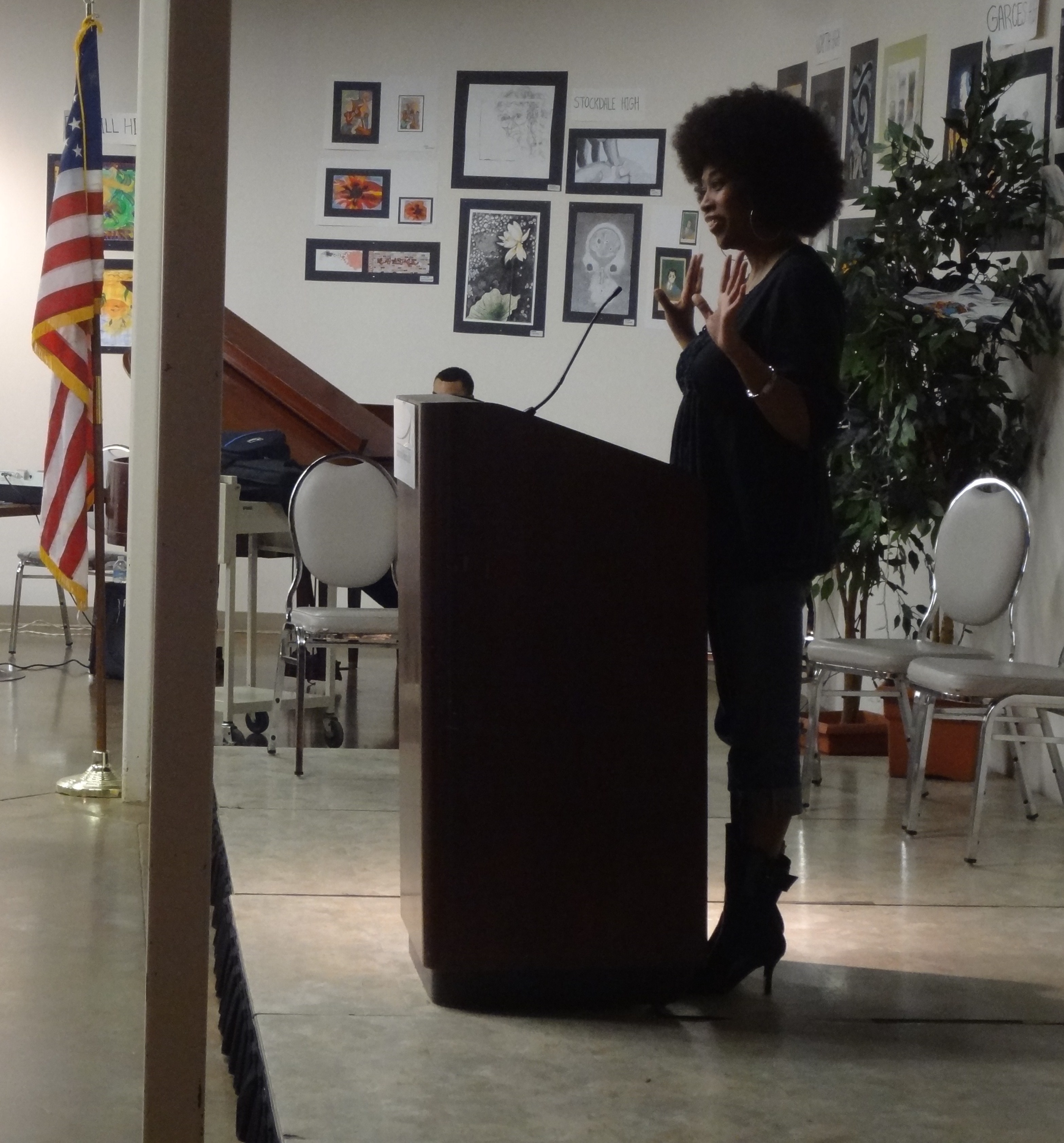
Files speaking in Bakersfield, CA in February 2013

=== Novels ===
- Scenes from a Sistah - Warner Books, April 1997
- Getting to the Good Part - Warner Books, January 1999
- Blind Ambitions - Simon & Schuster, September 2000
- Child of God - Simon & Schuster, September 2001
- Tastes Like Chicken - Simon & Schuster, May 2004
- sex.lies.murder.fame. - Amistad/HarperCollins, January 2006

=== Short stories ===
- "Roses, Red, Room 416" in the anthology Black Silk - Warner Books, February 2002
- "Bobby Q's Sauce" in the anthology Twilight Moods - Flowers in Bloom Publishing, September 2002
- "Standing Room Only" in the anthology Brown Sugar 3: When Opposites Attract - Washington Square Press, January 2004
- "Appropriate Measures" - The Lo Zone, November 2014

=== Novella ===
- "Three For The Road" in the anthology You Only Get Better - Kimani Press, March 2007

=== Nonfiction ===
Once Upon A Time In Compton (Tim Brennan & Robert Ladd with Lolita Files) - Amazon, April 2017

== Filmography ==
=== Producer ===
- Uncovered: Killed by Hate (TV Series, 2019) - Producer
- Who Killed Tupac? (TV Mini-Series, 2017) - Producer
- HBO First Look: All Eyez on Me (TV Series, 2017) - Producer
- Baggage Claim (Film, 2013) - Associate Producer
- Love in the Nick of Tyme (Video, 2007) - Associate Producer
