= Timothy M. Brennan and Robert Ladd =

American gang unit duo

Timothy Brennan & Robert Ladd
- Born: Timothy M. Brennan; March 2, 1959; Chicago, Illinois, U.S. Robert Ladd; February 19, 1959 (age 67); Hawthorne, California, U.S.
- Died: Brennan: November 16, 2021 (aged 62)
- Police career
- Country: United States
- Department: Compton Police Department; Los Angeles County Sheriff's Department; Garden Grove Police Department
- Service years: 1982 – 2014
- Rank: Police Officers - 1982–1988; Detectives - 1988–2015
- Other work: Gang Work Experts; Seminars and Training; Los Angeles Riots Experts; Experts on Tupac Shakur and The Notorious B.I.G./"Biggie Smalls" Murder Cases

Timothy M. Brennan (March 2, 1959 – November 16, 2021) and Robert Ladd (born February 19, 1959) joined the Compton Police Department as officers in 1982 and 1983, respectively. In 1988, they were promoted to become Compton's two-man gang unit. The police department could only afford to have two people at the time, even though many smaller cities typically had up to four times as many. As the gang unit, Brennan and Ladd were responsible for dealing with and investigating over 55 gangs in the 10.1 square mile area that makes up the City of Compton. They served as the primary or assisting investigating officers on hundreds of gang-related murders and thousands of gang-related shootings, and witnessed instances of gang-related rapes, robberies, drive-by shootings, and shootings at police officers.

Brennan and Ladd were present in Compton during the burgeoning days of Gangsta rap when it began in the 1980s and knew many of the artists involved in what would become the hip hop genre. They investigated and/or assisted investigations involving such figures as Tupac Shakur, Marion "Suge" Knight, David "DJ Quik" Blake, Eric "Eazy-E" Wright, Calvin "Snoop Dogg" Broadus, Eric "Lil Eazy" Wright, Jr., Jayceon "The Game" Taylor, and Christopher "Biggie Smalls" Wallace, among others. In the 1980s, when Brennan and Ladd were a presence on the Compton streets, a young DJ Quik released an underground rap song called "Blondie," describing Brennan.

Brennan and Ladd are featured in the Noisey/Vice.com film The Story Of 'Fuck Tha Police', starring N.W.A members Ice Cube and DJ Yella discussing the making of their eponymous seminal rap protest song. They are also heavily featured in the three-part A&E miniseries Streets of Compton, executive produced and narrated by rapper The Game.

Brennan and Ladd each retired from law enforcement in 2014 and resided in Orange County. They remained involved in providing gang training to schools, businesses, federal and local police and prosecutors across the country, U.S. military personnel, and police departments in countries in Europe. They provided gang-related intelligence and evidence for prosecution for law enforcement and prosecutorial agencies across the country. As gang investigators, they traveled extensively throughout California, Texas, Nevada, Illinois, Oklahoma, Louisiana, Washington, Arizona, and Iowa on gang-related investigations.

Their book Once Upon A Time In Compton, written with author/screenwriter Lolita Files, about their years in the Compton Gang Unit, the rise of Gangsta rap, gang wars, the L.A. riots, the investigations of the murders of rappers Tupac Shakur and The Notorious B.I.G., and the fall of the Compton Police Department, was published on April 25, 2017.

Brennan died on November 16, 2021. The cause of his death was not made public at the time, but Ladd later confirmed to DJ Vlad that Brennan died from cancer.

== Biography ==
=== Early lives ===
Timothy M. Brennan was born in Chicago and grew up in Park Ridge, near O'Hare International Airport on the northwest side of the city. Brennan's family had a long history in construction and law enforcement. His father Richard and brothers Mike and Pat were carpenters. His mother Madeleine had been a longtime secretary and matron for the Park Ridge Police Department, and both of his grandfathers and his great uncle were Chicago police officers from the 1920s through the 1950s and had worked through the gang wars of Al Capone and the Italian gangsters against Bugs Moran and the Irish gangsters. Brennan joined the U.S. Coast Guard Reserve at seventeen, while still in high school. He was stationed in New Jersey, Virginia, Louisiana, and Illinois. He worked construction by day and got his high school diploma by going to school at night. Eventually, the Chicago winters took their toll, and in February 1981, Brennan put his motorcycle and clothes in the back of his mini pickup and headed out west with $1,200, a new lease on life, and a desire to be a cop - a real cop in an area with a high crime rate, where real police work could be done. After looking for work and a place to stay in Arizona and Nevada, and with only $500 left, he decided to try Long Beach, California. He stored his bike and, as his money dwindled, slept in his truck. He eventually found construction work and got an apartment in downtown Long Beach.

Robert Ladd was born in Hawthorne, California and was raised in and has lived in Garden Grove all of his life. He met his wife Kathy when they were in junior high, attended high school with her, and they were married shortly after graduating. Ladd worked several different construction jobs until he decided that he wanted to become a police officer.

=== Joining Compton Police Department ===
In January 1982, Brennan joined the Compton Police Department. Even though Compton was not ranked nationally because the population was under 100,000, the city consistently had murder rates topping the nation's major cities. In the fall of that year, Brennan met his future wife, JoAnna Ramirez, who also worked for the department. Two-and-a-half years later they married and had two children, Brian (born 1987) and Jamie (born 1990).

In 1983, 24-year-old Ladd was fresh out of the police academy. He had been working as a reserve officer at the Garden Grove Police Department. By this time, Ladd had one child, his son Brian, and his wife was pregnant with his daughter Shannon. He was struggling financially, working construction at Miller's Outpost at the time, making just $200 a week. His pregnant wife Kathy was working as a waitress at Coco's Restaurant. Ladd was working several days a week at the Garden Grove Police Department trying to learn how to be a cop, but he needed a full-time position. During that time, however, Garden Grove P.D. had a hiring freeze. Ladd started applying everywhere. One of his arrest and control tactical officers during his time in the academy was a guy from the Huntington Beach Police Department named Barry Case. Case had started his career at the Compton Police Department and Ladd could tell the man loved his time there from the war stories he told. Case had advised Ladd and others in the academy that if they wanted to be a real cop, go work for Compton. Compton had been among the many police departments where Ladd had put in an application, and they were the first to offer him a position. Remembering Barry Case's words and wanting to learn real police work, he took the job.

In 1985, Brennan and Ladd became partners and remained a team until 2000, when the Compton Police Department closed.

=== Promotion To Compton Police Department gang unit ===
In 1988, the Compton Police Department formed a gang unit, but because there was a manpower shortage, it only consisted of two men: Brennan and Ladd. Even though the police department was predominantly African American, Brennan and Ladd, who were both white, were promoted because of their reputation for being exceptional at gang work and the regard they had among gang members and citizens who often felt they could be trusted to treat them with respect and humanity. Their sergeant, Reggie Wright Sr., chose them for the positions and Lieutenant Hourie Taylor approved the promotion. It did not take Brennan and Ladd long to start infiltrating gangs, solving murders, and drive-by shootings. Over the next twelve years, they developed an exceptional level of expertise regarding the dynamics of gang culture.

=== Murders of Compton police officers Kevin Burrell and James MacDonald ===
On the night of February 22, 1993, veteran Compton police officer Kevin Burrell and reserve officer James MacDonald rode together. MacDonald had just been hired full-time as a police officer in Northern California and was working his last night as a part of the Compton force. Both men were brutally murdered by "Bounty Hunter" Bloods gang member Regis Deon Thomas. Brennan and Ladd were a part of the task force that was formed in the wake of these murders that ultimately led to the arrest and conviction of Thomas, who was sentenced to California's death row.

=== Fall of Compton Police Department/post-Compton PD police work ===
On September 16, 2000, the Compton Police Department was disbanded by the City Council and law enforcement services were provided by the Los Angeles County Sheriff's Department. Brennan joined the LA Sheriff's Department and served as a Gang Investigator on a Gang Homicide Task Force. Ladd joined the Garden Grove Police Department and served as a Sergeant in charge of the gang unit. Both men retired from active duty in law enforcement in 2014, but still acted as consultants on gang training and are experts on the Los Angeles riots, the Tupac Shakur murder case, and the murder of The Notorious B.I.G.

== 1992 Los Angeles riots ==
In the wake of the 1992 Los Angeles riots that erupted after the not-guilty verdict for the police officers who were filmed beating Rodney King, a task force consisting of members of the Los Angeles County Sheriff's Department, the LAPD, the Long Beach Police Department, the Inglewood Police Department, the Compton Police Department, and the FBI, along with the Los Angeles County District Attorney's Office and State's Attorney's Office, was formed to investigate riot-related crimes. Brennan was appointed as the Compton PD representative. This was his first task force. Brennan divided his time between investigating ongoing shootings and murders in Compton with his task force investigations. Thousands of hours of video were reviewed and hundreds of gang members and others were identified in numerous crimes and numerous arrests were made.

== Tupac Shakur and The Notorious B.I.G. murder investigations ==
In 1996, Brennan and Ladd were assigned to assist the Las Vegas Police Department in the Tupac Shakur murder investigation.

In 1997, Brennan was assigned to assist the LAPD in rapper The Notorious B.I.G.'s murder investigation. From 2006 to 2007, he was assigned to The Notorious B.I.G. Task Force investigation with the LAPD.

Brennan wrote a 40-location gang warrant affidavit that chronicled the investigation into these shootings. The affidavit named Orlando "Baby Lane" Anderson as a suspect in Tupac's shooting. The affidavit established the "East Coast vs West Coast" rap rivalry, and the rivalry between The Notorious B.I.G. and Puff Daddy who used the South Side Compton Crips as security, & Tupac Shakur and Suge Knight, who used the Mob Piru as security.

He was quoted in a September 7, 2002 article in the Los Angeles Times:

I believe Tupac's murder could have been solved--and it still could be," said Tim Brennan, a Compton gang investigator now with the Sheriff's Department. "All the clues are right there. What the investigation lacked was input from detectives who understood the gangs involved and how they operate and who all the players are. I believe justice could still be served."

== Books ==
The book Once Upon a Time in Compton, by Brennan and Ladd with author/screenwriter Lolita Files, about their years in the Compton Gang Unit, the rise of Gangsta rap, gang wars, the L.A. riots, the investigations of the murders of rappers Tupac Shakur and The Notorious B.I.G., and the fall of the Compton Police Department, was published on April 25, 2017.

== Television ==
Brennan and Ladd were previously working with writers and producers to develop a dramatic television series inspired by their experiences in the Compton Gang Unit. However, Brennan died suddenly in 2021. (Death date- in this article)
