= Regi =

Regi or REGI may refer to:

- Reģi, a village in Alsunga Municipality in Latvia
- Regi Penxten (Belgian musician, born 1976), Belgian DJ and record producer
- László Régi (born 1911), Hungarian international football player
- María Vallet-Regí (born 1946), Spanish inorganic chemist
- The Regi, a group of Legendary Pokémon in the Pokémon franchise.
- Committee on Regional Development, committee within the European Parliament
- Raptor Education Group Inc., wildlife rehabilitation centre in Wisconsin, USA

== See also ==
- Regis (disambiguation)
- Reggie (disambiguation)
- Reg (disambiguation)
