= Saint Regis =

Saint Regis (or St. Regis) may refer to:

== People ==
- John Francis Regis, recognized as a saint by the Roman Catholic Church

== Hotels ==
- St. Regis Hotels & Resorts
  - St. Regis New York the original from which the brand is named

== Places ==
=== Canada ===
- Saint Regis, Quebec, the Canadian side of the St. Regis Mohawk Reservation, also called Akwesasne
- Saint-Régis River (Roussillon), a tributary of the south shore of the St. Lawrence River in Quebec

=== United States ===
- St. Regis Park, Kentucky, part of Louisville Metro
- St. Regis, Montana, a census-designated place
- St. Regis Falls, New York, a census-designated place in the town of Waverly
- St. Regis Mohawk Reservation, New York, along the Canada–US border
  - St. Regis, New York, a hamlet within the reservation
- Saint Regis Mountain, New York
- St. Regis River in New York
  - Saint Regis Canoe Area
  - Lower St. Regis Lake
  - Upper St. Regis Lake
  - Saint Regis Pond
- St. Regis River (Montana)

== Other uses ==
- St. Regis Indians, former lacrosse team from New York
- Saint Regis University, a defunct diploma mill
- Dodge St. Regis, an automobile (1979–81)
- St. Regis Corporation, a major forest products company, merged with Champion International Paper in 1984
- USS St. Regis River (LSM(R)-529), an American military landing craft

== See also ==
- Regis (disambiguation)
