= Regius =

Regius may refer to:

- Regius Professor, "Royal" Professorships at the universities including Oxford, Cambridge, St Andrews, Glasgow, Aberdeen, Edinburgh and Dublin
- Regius Keeper of the Royal Botanical Garden Edinburgh
- Raphael Regius (c.1440–1520), Venetian humanist
- Henricus Regius (1598–1679), Dutch philosopher and physician
- Codex Regius, Icelandic manuscript in which the Poetic Edda is preserved
- Hippo Regius, ancient name of the modern city of Annaba, Algeria
- Titulus Regius, 1483 statute of the Parliament of England, giving the title "King of England" to Richard III

== See also ==
- Regis (disambiguation) (Latin "of the king")
- Regia (disambiguation) (Latin "royal" feminine adjective)
- Regium (disambiguation) (Latin "royal" neuter adjective)
