= Regis School =

Regis School may refer to:

- The Regis School, Bognor Regis, West Sussex, England
- The Regis School of the Sacred Heart, Spring Branch, Houston, Texas, United States

== See also ==
- Regis High School (disambiguation)
