= Regis (surname) =

Regis or Régis is a surname. Notable persons with that surname include:

- Albert Regis (born 2003), American football player
- Balthasar Regis (died 1757), Canon of Windsor
- Cyrille Regis (1958–2018), English association football player
- Dave Regis (born 1964), English association football player
- David Regis (born 1968), French-American association football player
- Ed Regis (author) (born 1944), American author and educator
- Hazel-Ann Regis (born 1981), Grenadian sprinter
- Jean-Baptiste Régis (died 1738), French Jesuit missionary
- John Regis (athlete) (born 1966), English sprinter
- Johannes Regis (c. 1425 – c. 1496), Franco-Flemish composer
- John Francis Regis (1597–1640), French Jesuit and Roman Catholic saint
- Louis-Marie Régis (1903–1988), Canadian philosopher, theologian, and scholar
- Miles Regis (born 1967), American-Trinidadian multi-media artist
- Pierre-Sylvain Régis (1632–1707), French philosopher
- Robert Regis (born 1967), English association football player
- Rogério Fidélis Régis (born 1976), Brazilian football player
- Sheryn Regis (born 1980), Filipina pop singer and composer
- Simone Régis, Brazilian fashion model and beauty queen
