= Regnum =

Regnum may refer to:

- Latin for kingdom or dominion, see realm
- Regnum, Latin word for Kingdom (biology)
- REGNUM News Agency, a Russian news agency
- Champions of Regnum, a computer game
- An online database for PhyloCode
