= Sala Regia =

Sala Regia (Italian, 'Regal Room') may refer to:

- Sala Regia (Vatican)
- Sala Regia of Quirinal Palace in Rome, Italy
- Sala Regia in the Appartamento Cibo of Palazzo Venezia in Rome, Italy
- Sala Regia, the main hall of Palazzo dei Priori, Viterbo, Italy
- Sala Regia in the Royal Palace of Naples

== See also ==
- Salón Regio in the Generalife in Granada, Spain
