= Regis Deon Thomas =

American murderer and Bloods gangster on death row

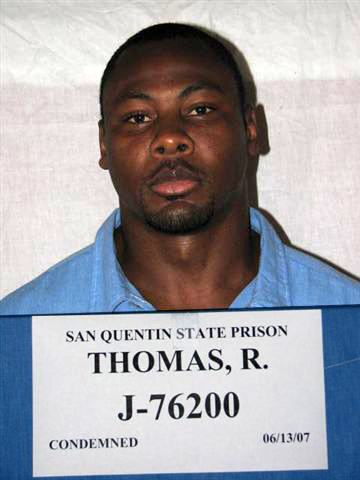
- Born: June 16, 1970 (age 56); Los Angeles, California, U.S.
- Convictions: First degree murder with special circumstances (2 counts); Second degree murder Perjury; Being a felon in possession of a firearm Possession of a concealed firearm in a vehicle
- Penalty: Death

Details
- Victims: 3
- Span of crimes: 1992–1993
- Country: United States
- State: California
- Date apprehended: April 6, 1993
- Imprisoned at: San Quentin State Prison

Regis Deon Thomas (born June 16, 1970) is an American serial killer and Bloods gang member who was sentenced to death for the 1993 murders of Kevin Michael Burrell and James Wayne MacDonald, two officers in the Compton Police Department who were shot dead during a traffic stop in the City of Compton. They were the only Compton police officers killed in the line of duty in the department's 65-year history. Thomas was also convicted of murdering another man in 1992 in Torrance, California.

== Background ==
Thomas was born on June 16, 1970. He was the oldest of four children and grew up in South-Central Los Angeles. He was a member of the Bounty Hunter Bloods street gang, a Bloods subset based out of Watts, Los Angeles, California. Thomas was convicted of perjury in 1990. He had once worked at a liquor store as a security guard, but the building was burned down during the 1992 Los Angeles riots, resulting in Thomas being out of work for a year.

== Murders ==
On January 31, 1992, Thomas murdered Carlos Adkins in an apartment in Torrance by shooting him.

Over a year later, on the night of February 22, 1993, at about 11 p.m., Compton Police Officer Kevin Michael Burrell, 29, and Reserve Officer James Wayne MacDonald, 24, made a routine traffic stop in Compton, at the intersection of Rosecrans Avenue and Dwight Avenue, on a red 1992 Chevrolet 454 pickup truck being driven by Thomas. As the officers exited their patrol car and approached the pickup truck, Thomas exited his vehicle and opened fire on both officers. Both officers were knocked down to the ground by bullet wounds. According to trial testimony, Thomas shot at their heads execution-style. Both officers were wearing bulletproof vests and were found lying face down near their patrol car with their guns holstered. There were nine spent nine-millimeter shell casings in front of the patrol car. Burrell died of multiple gunshot wounds to the arm, face, left foot, and head. MacDonald was also shot four times in his left armpit, middle back, upper back, and behind the right ear and died of a gunshot wound to the chest. After the shootings, Thomas returned to his truck and drove away.

== Trial ==
Neither officer had notified dispatchers to report the traffic stop or request a background check on the truck's license plates. Detectives initially worked under the assumption that there were at least two assailants in the truck. Burrell and MacDonald were armed, but neither had even been given a chance to draw their gun. MacDonald and Burrell, a 5-year police veteran, were the second and third police officers killed on duty in the history of the Compton police force. MacDonald was killed during his last ever shift as a volunteer reserve officer on the Compton force. A massive manhunt ensued after the officers' deaths, which led to five arrests in other cases, solving three murders and two attempted killings. Compton police officers Timothy M. Brennan and Robert Ladd were a part of the task force that was formed in the wake of the murders that ultimately led to the arrest and conviction of Thomas.

Thomas was captured on April 6, 1993, when he surrendered to KTLA television reporter Warren Wilson. He was found guilty of two counts of first degree murder and one count of second degree murder, and was sentenced to death on August 15, 1995. He is currently on death row awaiting execution and is imprisoned at San Quentin State Prison. His CDCR number is J76200.

== See also ==
- List of death row inmates in the United States
- List of serial killers in the United States
