= Collegium Regium =

Collegium Regium is the Latin for King's College or Royal College. It is or has been the Latin name, occasionally used also in the vernacular, for a number of institutions, such as:

- Collegium Regium Stockholmense, a short-lived Jesuit-influenced college in late 16th century Stockholm.
- Collegium Regium, better known as Regensen, a residential college at the University of Copenhagen, inaugurated in 1623.
