= Régis Pitbull =

Brazilian footballer

Regis Pitbull
Personal information
- Full name: Regis Fernandes Silva
- Date of birth: September 22, 1976 (age 50)
- Place of birth: São Paulo, Brazil
- Height: 1.75 m (5 ft 9 in)
- Position: Forward

Team information
- Current team: Caxias-SC

Senior career*
Years	Team	Apps	(Gls)
1996–1997	Marítimo		
1997–2002	Ponte Preta		
1999	→ Ceará (loan)		
2000	→ Kyoto Purple Sanga (loan)	21	(4)
2001	→ Bahia (loan)		
2002–2003	Gaziantepspor	2	(0)
2003	Vasco da Gama		
2004–2005	Corinthians		
2004	→ Portuguesa (loan)		
2005	Portuguesa Santista		
2006	Inter de Limeira		
2006	Daejeon Citizen	7	(0)
2007	Vilavehlense		
2007	Rio Branco-MG		
2007	ABC		
2008	Rio Branco-MG		
2009	Poços de Caldas		
2010	São Raimundo-AM		
2011–	Caxias-SC		
- * Club domestic league appearances and goals as of 17:33, 25 April 2021 (UTC)

Régis Fernandes Silva (born September 22, 1976 in São Paulo), better known as Régis Pitbull or simply Régis, is a former Brazilian footballer who played as a forward.

== Club statistics ==
Club performance			League		Cup		League Cup		Total	
Season	Club	League	Apps	Goals	Apps	Goals	Apps	Goals	Apps	Goals
Japan			League		Emperor's Cup		J.League Cup		Total	
2000	Kyoto Purple Sanga	J1 League	21	4	0	0	4	3	25	7
Total			21	4	0	0	4	3	25	7

== Personal life ==
Régis has battled drug addiction. In April 2021, he was admitted to a rehabilitation clinic.
