= Régis (footballer, born 1965) =

Brazilian footballer

Personal information
- Full name: Reginaldo Paes Leme Ferreira
- Date of birth: 23 April 1965 (age 61)
- Place of birth: Itumbiara, Brazil
- Height: 1.88 m (6 ft 2 in)
- Position: Goalkeeper

Senior career*
Years	Team	Apps	(Gls)
1985–1992	Vasco da Gama	72	(0)
1986–1987	→ America (loan)	28	(0)
1988	→ Cabofriense (loan)	10	(0)
1990–1991	→ Braga (loan)	29	(0)
1993–1999	Paraná	139	(1)
1998	→ Coritiba (loan)	2	(0)
Total		280	(0)

International career
1987	Brazil	2	(0)
- * Club domestic league appearances and goals

Reginaldo Paes Leme Ferreira, best known as Régis (born 23 April 1965) is a Brazilian former footballer who played as a goalkeeper, best known for his performances for Vasco da Gama and Paraná. He was born in Itumbiara, Goiás State.
