= Regis High School =

Regis High School may refer to several schools in the United States:

- Regis High School (Iowa), located in Cedar Rapids, Iowa
- Regis High School (New York City)
- Regis High School (Oregon), located in Stayton, Oregon
- Regis High School (Wisconsin), located in Eau Claire, Wisconsin
- Regis Jesuit High School, located in Aurora, Colorado
- The Regis School of the Sacred Heart, located in Houston, Texas
