= Compton Police Department =

California, United States (1888–2000)

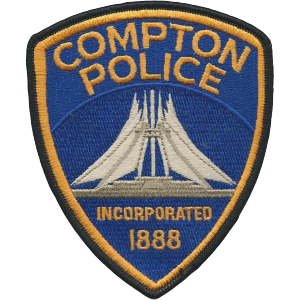
- Patch of the Compton Police Department
- Abbreviation: CPD

Agency overview
- Formed: 1888
- Dissolved: September 2000

Jurisdictional structure
- Legal jurisdiction: Compton, California
- General nature: Local civilian police

The Compton Police Department was the municipal law enforcement agency for the city of Compton, California until it was disbanded by the City Council in September 2000. The Compton City Council then contracted with the County of Los Angeles for law enforcement services provided by the Los Angeles County Sheriff's Department.

Since the dissolution of the department, there have been repeated unsuccessful efforts to re-establish a police force.

== History ==
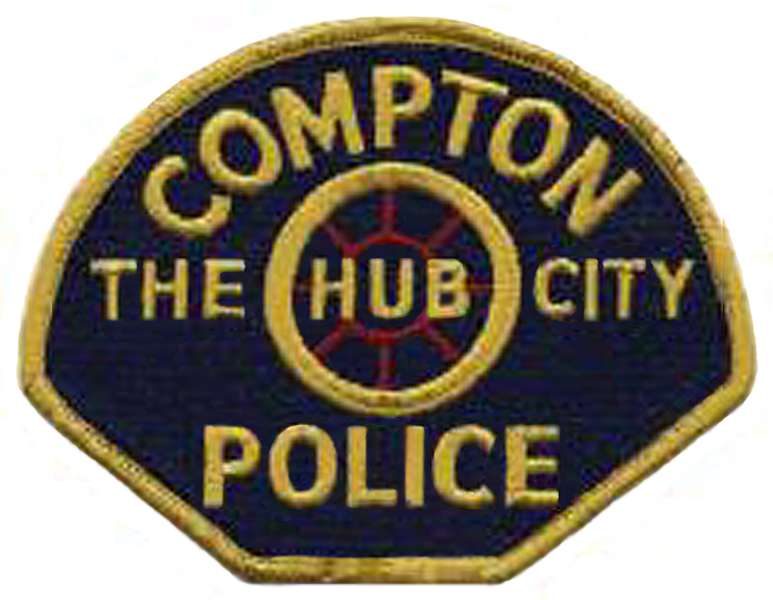
Old Compton Police patch

The City of Compton is a Los Angeles area middle-class suburban community and dubbed the Hub City because it is 11 miles from Los Angeles and as many miles from Long Beach Harbor. The city police was founded in 1888, when the city of Compton became incorporated. City of Compton police served the city of Compton and areas outside of its city limits such as the community of Willowbrook.

=== Early law enforcement in Compton ===
Three days after the official date of incorporation of the city on May 14, 1888 at the first meeting of the Compton Board of Trustees, the board recognized the need for a local law enforcement agency. Asbury McComas, owner of a local livery stable, was named to the post. Two weeks later on May 28, the Board of Trustees established the first committee on police matters and set the City Marshal's salary at $100 annually.

McComas was asked to resign over questions of license and dog tax fees in early 1889, however he was reappointed in 1892 after F.H. Carson was unable to qualify for the position.

C.W. Lyman replaced McComas and the Marshal's salary was raised to $15 per month plus 10 percent of the dog tax. An entry to the minutes of the board of trustees for July 22, 1889 shows that Marshal Lyman was paid $1.95 for "taking care of an intoxicated woman."

In 1890, G.F. Willits replaced Lyman as City Marshal. Sometime that same year, the Marshal and other elected officials agreed to donate four months' salary to make up a budget deficiency so that the city could purchase four fire hydrants.

=== 1891 disbandment ===
In 1890 Compton voters decided to shed large portions of the city, dropping in size from approximately 600 acres to 80 acres. As a result of this dramatic decrease in size, there were only five registered voters living within the boundaries of Compton. With so few residents, the government was unable to support itself with enough people to occupy various positions, and the city quietly stagnated with limited or no local governance. This effectively ceased all policing activities by the city, with the Los Angeles County Sheriff's Department (LASD) stepping in to fill the gap. Due to the lapse in governance between 1891 and 1906, records do not show when Marshal Willits left office. He most likely served until the LASD took over local police duties in 1891.

By 1906, attorneys Emmett Wilson and E.T. Sherer filed suit to nullify the votes of 1890, and Compton was brought back to the 600 acre size it was at the time of incorporation.

=== 1906 re-establishment ===
With the return of local government in late 1906, a slate of candidates for the Board of Trustees (the People's Ticket) was voted in without opposition. H.J. Mayo, the candidate for City Marshal, served until sometime in 1907, when he was succeeded by Howard Peck. Peck was replaced sometime in 1906 by W.J. Davis, who served until 1911.

=== 1910s–1920s ===
On April 7, 1908, the Marshal's pay had been raised to include 1.5 percent of all taxes collected by him as ex officio City Tax Collector. On July 7, 1909, Marshal Davis was authorized to purchase two handbooks on street law. Effective June 7, 1910, the Marshal's salary was raised to $15 per month plus 10 percent of license money and 15 percent of dog tax money collected. On January 3, 1911, Davis asked to Board of Trustees for authority to hire motorcycle officers. Two weeks later, the request was granted. The officers were to be employed part-time for a 30-day period effective January 17. Their pay was set a 50 percent of all fines they collected, minus recorder's fees.

Records show that L. J. Grout became City Marshal sometime in 1911 and resigned that same year. He was succeeded by J.W. Stone.

On February 21, 1911, the board voted to pay the officers $6 from each $10 fine and 50 percent of the gross of fines above $10. Apparently, this arrangement was viewed as being biased in favor of the officers because the city soon found itself in its first recorded contract negotiations with the motorcycle policemen. On April 14 that same year, an agreement was reached whereby the officers were to receive $6 from each $10 fine and $7.50 from each fine over $15 until further notice.

In 1916, A.E. Kenoyer became Marshal, replacing Stone, who had held office longer than anyone else up to that time. In 1920, Kenoyer was succeeded by Charles G. Davidson and in 1921, the Marshal was authorized to place a red light at the front of the police station, possibly to signal patrol officers to check the station for calls.

In June of that same year, the city's first salaried part-time motorcycle officer, Claude Bonta, was hired. He was paid $1 per hour and was to work not less than 20 hours per week. On March 7, 1922, Ray Hecock was hired as the first full-time salaried motorcycle officer. He was paid $175 per month. Hecock would later become a Captain in the department, and serve as acting chief of the department during the War of the Chiefs in March of 1936.

Effective July 17, 1923, the salary of the City Marshal was also set at $175 per month.

==== From Marshal to Chief of Police ====
John Oliver (J.O.) Burris, a city trustee, became Marshal in 1922 and served until February 27, 1923. The Board of Trustees then appointed Evert Albert West Police Chief and by minute motion gave him authority over all the city's police officers. This move by the Board effectively removed law enforcement from the political arena. Henceforth, police chiefs would be appointed, not elected as had been the case with City Marshals.

=== 1930s–1950s ===
West joined the Los Angeles Police Department as a patrolman in 1912. For seven years, he served as a traffic officer, plainclothesman and detective. After resigning and going into business, he returned to police work in 1924, joining the Compton, California, force. He became chief of the Compton Police Department and was involved in the "War of the Chiefs", along with his replacement, Thomas J. Potter. Both men claimed to be the legal chief of police between 1935 and 1936. West died in 1962.

Potter served as Chief of Police for almost 19 years, dying of a heart attack in 1952 while in office. Under Potter, the department consisted of seventeen officers and was divided into three major activities: traffic regulation and control, criminal investigation and patrol. The majority of the force of the department was assigned to patrol activity. Two-way radio communication was expanded to include motor officers and fire equipment. A full-time radio technician maintained the equipment and built all new transmitters and receivers, and all radio equipment was in the process of being converted to ultra high frequency range for elimination of interference.

During the war period, the department worked without adequate manpower. The increase in the city's population during and shortly after the war required the police personnel to almost double in size in 1940. The increase in activity and number of personnel necessitated re-organization. These efforts culminated with the City Council announcing a plan for restricting the department. At that time, the force consisted of 39 officers and men equipped with ten motorcycles, six radio patrol cars and one three-wheel motorcycle.

Compton's sole female police officer, Lucille Stroh, helped the department create a juvenile division in 1952. This division was tasked with working with parents and "juvenile delinquents" to help "determine the cause behind the act and take corrective measures if needed".

=== 1960s–1970s ===
William K. Ingram was chief from 1953 to 1973. Under his tenure, the Police Department was organized into six divisions: patrol, jail, detective, traffic division, records, and juvenile.

Construction on a new station was started in 1962. This station included requirements for proper detention facilities for juveniles, as well as a pistol range, laboratory, photograph dark room, evidence and records vaults and classrooms. The structure cost approximately $750,000, and the lead architect was Marion J. Varner, noted for his civic and police building designs.

==== 1962 death of Officer Phipps ====
In 1962, Officer Dess Kingsley Phipps was killed in a vehicle pursuit of two suspects wanted in an armed robbery. According to records, "Another vehicle struck Officer Phipps's patrol car at the intersection of Artesia Boulevard and Wilmington Avenue. The vehicle then struck two other vehicles. A second accident then occurred when another car collided with several cars that were stopped for the first crash. One driver involved in the second accident was also killed. The subjects in the vehicle being pursued fled the scene but were later apprehended. They were charged with murder and burglary."

==== 1970 station bombing ====
Twenty-three year old Thomas Lige Harper was killed when a bomb he was carrying exploded outside of the Compton Police station. Harper had several minor run-ins with law enforcement, and at the time of the bombing was wanted on a bench warrant for failing to adhere to his probation for marijuana possession. A search of his apartment turned up three sticks of dynamite, three sticks of plastic explosives, several lengths of pipe, three pistols, two rifles and a shotgun, and around 200 rounds of ammunition. Harper was also found to have literature related to the Black Panther Party, however his possible involvement was unknown to law enforcement. Police believe that Harper was attempting to bomb the station and that he miscalculated the timing of the device. Harper's motives are unclear as he died in the explosion, but the LA Times noted "Tommy Harper, who never used to fight back, apparently thought he found a simple solution to a complex problem".

==== 1971 "Blue Flu" strike ====
In 1971, Compton officers rejected a proposed four percent wage increase and initiated a "work slowdown". Stating that they wanted an 11% raise to match LASD deputies, the officers engaged in "professionalization" of their work. This entailed exhaustive work on even the most trivial cases, tying up resources while ostensibly still engaged in their work. They stated that by July 15 they would initiate the "Blue Flu" On July 16, an officer was terminated from the department after he refused an evaluation by the City Physician after calling out as part of the "blue flu". Harkening back to the tumultuous "War of the Chiefs" in the mid-1930s, the city charter allowed only the city manager to terminate officers, and Acting City Manager Berton Wills, as recommended by Chief Ingram, initiated the termination.

A Superior Court judge issued a restraining order prohibiting "activities which would constitute a work stoppage or otherwise inhibit the providing of police services". Officers and the city agreed to postpone talks of the raise until March 1972. In total four officers were fired for engaging in the "blue flu", they were later rehired.

==== Rising crime rates ====
By the mid-1970s, Compton residents vocally complained about rising crime rates, feeling as if they were "under siege". Resident Dr. Earnest Smith noted "That doesn't mean just by the juvenile gangs, but by the police, politicians and officialdom as well". Residents felt caught between violent criminals and oppressive policing, with "racial undertones" permeating the city. Statistics from the early 1970s paint a dire image of crime in Compton, with the city ranking at the top of the crime per capita of the nation. Inextricably linked in residents minds with the rising crime were concerns and complaints against the services of the Compton Police, including slow (or none-existent) response time, lack of access to senior police officials, and police brutality. In 1973, the department (and the city) were faced with multiple lawsuits over police misconduct, all of which the department and chief vehemently denied.

In addition to mounting concerns over crime in Compton, a 1974 Grand Jury Report released a report on six southeastern California jail facilities with significant problems, including Compton. Among concerns over Compton's jail facilities, the report also presaged the future by recommending the city consolidate their emergency services (both police and fire) with the County of Los Angeles.

Thomas W. Cochee, chief from 1973 to 1976, was a former Los Angeles County Sheriff's sergeant. In addition to being Compton's first black chief, he was the first to be appointed in the state of California. As a veteran of law enforcement and as an educator, Cochee was offered the job by the city because "...they wanted someone who represented a blend of law and order and community relations awareness." He and his family lived in a Compton apartment, eventually hoping the entire police force would be made up of Compton residents.

The city of Compton, the police department and Cochee were the subject of a 1974 book entitled Ghetto Cops: On the Streets of the Most Dangerous City in America by Bruce Henderson.

"Crime in Compton had reached the unbearable level. The law-abiding residents of Compton lived in homes with bars on windows and double locks on doors. They felt as though they had been imprisoned while the criminals roamed free." That grim, foreboding assessment was made in 1975 by the Los Angeles Grand Jury (headed by a black foreman for the first time) to sum up the critical situation faced by what was termed "the most crime-infested city" in the U.S. What was most dismaying was that Compton was 99 per cent non-white with a black mayor and a black police chief. More than any place in the nation, the California city dramatized the growing concern of blacks about black crime and how to stop blacks from victimizing other blacks. When asked what he hoped to accomplish as Compton's police chief, Cocheé replied, "By 1985, we want to change Compton's image and make it the safest city in the state."

===== Contentions between Cochee and City Council =====
In August 1975, Cochee was "temporarily" moved from his position by the city manager as Chief to a "special assignment" to "evaluate federal programs pertaining to police", for a period of no more than 90 days. The town council noted that there were charges against the chief that "are too serious to be brought up here". A few days later Cochee made his own allegations that his temporary removal was related to a conspiracy by the City Council to create a "West Coast gambling mecca" in Compton, however this statement was based only on rumors and conjecture.

Cochee was subsequently fired from his position as chief in mid-August 1975, on the grounds of "insubordination, willfully making false statements to the press and failure to follow personal rules and regulations". Cochee's second in command, Manual Correa stepped in as temporary chief. Acting City Council Manager Daniel Lim stated that this action was taken "unilaterally", without "any direction from the City Council". Lim maintained that Cochee should have followed procedures of filing a complaint with the city personnel board, rather than an unauthorized press conference. Yet again reminiscent of the "War of the Chiefs", the police department and city council were at odds with each other. Residents of Compton were also divided on Cochee's removal.

After Cochee requested a formal hearing in late August 1975, the city personal board began to conduct hearings. Testimony during the hearings included allegations of cheating on promotion tests, and that Cochee offered "little active support" in the ensuing investigation. After more than twenty hours of hearings, Cochee was formally reinstated in September. The board discounted many of the charges by Lim, upholding only the charges of false statements and failure to accept an assignment, also going on to state that termination was "too harsh a penalty".

In addition to his contentious relationship with the city council, Cochee also came under criticism for his involvement in the book Ghetto Cops. It was originally published in late 1974, however Cochee requested that the specific details and names be removed. The publisher agreed, and destroyed the initial 20,000 copies printed, eventually releasing 40,000 copies with substitutions. Many people in Compton took exception to the portrayal of the city in the book, as well as the unfettered department access Cochee afforded the authors.

===== Compton Police Officers Association and The Guardians =====
Turmoil within the department did not cease with the reinstatement of Cochee. Racial tensions boiled over within the Compton Police Officers Association (CPOA), with a majority of the African-American members leaving the CPOA and forming their own group, The Guardians. Both African-American and Caucasian officers of the department made allegations of racism. Sixty-three of the 135 officers of the department were African America (47%), while 71% of Compton identified as black. Officers stated that the makeup of the CPOA did not accurately of effectively represent the department. The Caucasian officers of the CPOA then threatened to sue the city for alleged "discriminatory acts" by the department and by the Chief. Cochee responded that there was lack of support for him "from white racist police officers. There are some white officers on our Police Department who don't give a damn about black people in general, nor do they care...for the residents of Compton".

In March 1976, the CPOA filed a civil rights suit against Cochee and the city's personnel director. The suit alleged "discrimination against non-black police officers and applicants...with respect to employment, promotion or transfer on account of their race". The lawsuit was eventually dropped.

Cochee was also noted as being lax in issuing concealed weapon permits, frequently granting them to "persons in the entertainment industry who couldn't get permits elsewhere." Cochee issued between 25 and 50 permits during his tenure, helping Compton to be known as the easiest place in the Southland area to get a permit.

===== Cochee's Resignation =====
A study by the Los Angeles County Commission on Human Relations, provided to Cochee in March (and made public in July), called into question his abilities to lead the department. It cited a loss of "...control of the department personnel", and that "...detectives use time to plan against the chief". The study went on to note that officers reported racism "between individuals" was an issue, that Cochee needed to "take control firmly and make his own decisions regardless of pressures and intimidations from political forces" and that he must "lead decisively, swiftly and fairly". It also went on to note that issues with racism frequently stemmed from the competing fraternal organizations (the CPOA and The Guardians). Shortly after the public release of the report, Cochee submitted his resignation as chief.

In 1976, Joseph T. Rouzan, Jr., a 21-year veteran of the LAPD, was appointed chief. To address some of the complaints by the Human Rights Commission, one of Rouzans first acts was to restructure the department, creating three commander posts. The three commanders oversaw administrative services (records, communications, the jail), special services (narcotics, vice, intelligence, personnel) and community services (patrol, gang, robbery, traffic).

In 1979, the department had 128 sworn officers, with an additional 14 out on long-term leave or disability, a ratio that was noted as being higher than average. This deficit was highlighted by the city having to lay off employees the previous year to balance the budget, an action that saw further strife and contention between the department and the city, along with continued questions about the departments ability to function.

Rouzan left the office of the Chief in 1979 and was appointed City Manager.

=== 1980s ===
James L. Carrington was the first black chief to rise through the ranks. He began his law enforcement career in 1960 with the Los Angeles County Sheriff's Department. In 1962, he joined the Compton Police Department. He left Compton Police Department as a lieutenant after serving 13 years when he was selected by the City of Irvine to be a member of its team establishing a new police agency. After three years in Irvine, Carrington returned to Compton as a police commander. In 1980, three successive promotions saw him become Director of Police services, Assistant Chief of Police, then Chief of Police.

In 1983, in an effort to alleviate an overpopulated workspace for the department staff and to save money, Compton decided to close their jail. While people charged with felonies and serious misdemeanors were already jailed in the LASD facility in Carson CA, the new plan saw Compton transporting prisoners to the county facility three times a day. The LASD did not charge Compton for this service as it was covered by taxes, and the move was projected to save Compton $185,000 per year. By 1984, the jail had been converted from a 48-hour holding facility to a 6-hour holding facility, with a savings of $55,000 per year to the department.

Gang crime continued to escalate, with residents complaining loudly to the City Council in a 2-hour city council meeting in October 1984 that they felt like "prisoners in their own homes". Councilmember Robert Adams believed that Chief Carrington needed to be replaced, and many residents agreed. Some members of the council and citizens believed that the LASD should assume policing duties for the city, stating "...when it is mentioned the Sheriff's Department is on the way, they [gang members] run like rats".

In a press conference in November 1984, Carrington responded to the charges from the city council about the performance of the department. The council alleged that police officers were "rude, ineffective, poorly led and insensitive to citizen complaints", and that "drugs are blatantly sold on the streets". Carrington retorted "I'd rather fly with the eagles of this department than flounder with the turkeys who are going to try to bring us down". He went on to stated "It's taken me almost four years to reach (this point)…purging those (officers) who should not have been here in the first place and changing some of the attitudes of those who want to remain...I'm not going to say to you that none of our officers are rude...look at the track record on (officer) discipline". Carrington refused to resign as some on the City Council demanded, citing confidence and support of his officers.

Carrington's 21 years of service with the City of Compton concluded with his retirement on October 7, 1985.

In late 1985, narcotics officer Theodore Brown pleaded guilty to the theft of six grams of cocaine during the execution of a search warrant.

Ivory J. Webb, who replaced Carrington as chief on January 31, 1986, spent nearly three decades with the Compton Police Department. He became a sergeant in 1968, a lieutenant in 1969, a commander in 1977 and his last 4½ years as chief. Webb faced increasing calls for action by the department to curb ever growing gang activity. By 1987, the LA Times reported that there were "at least 36 identifiable street gangs...within the city's 10-square-mile limits". In response, Webb and the department pledged to increase the number of officers assigned to the gang unit (from five to fifteen), mandating all sworn officers on patrols, enforcing curfew and loitering laws, and shifting focus for the drug enforcement unit to gang narcotics trafficking.

In 1987, the department established an Air Support Squad. The squad was based out of Compton Airport with three helicopters and provided helicopter based air-support for the officers on the ground. In 1990, one of the Compton helicopters collided with LASD helicopter, with no injuries or fatalities.

The gang and narcotic units were disbanded in 1987. The gang unit dissolved ostensibly over a lack of manpower, and the narcotics unit for "improprieties". The gang unit was reconstituted in 1988, but the officers involved, Sergeant Hourie Tayler (later to be Chief) and Ramon E. Allen (also later to be Chief), created an interdepartmental rivalry that would only deepen the discord and frustration of those working in the department.

Testifying before the US House of Representatives in 1988, Webb reported that "approximately 36 active street gangs presently exist...with about 19 Crips sets, about 10 Piru or Blood sets, and 7 Hispanic gangs".

==== Street Terrorism Enforcement and Prevention (STEP) Act ====
In 1988, the California State Legislature enacted the Street Terrorism Enforcement and Prevention Act (STEP Act) to help curb gang and gang related crimes. The act, which has been updated and strengthened in the intervening years, was aimed at "the eradication of criminal activity by street gangs". The STEP Act made it illegal (and punishable) for being engaged in gang related activity. The Act identified gangs as "a formal or informal group of more than three people with a primary activity of committing crimes, who have a common name or..symbol and whose members individually or collectively engage in...criminal activity". In 1989, Compton began serving written notices to known gang members. The intent of this written notice was to assist prosecutors should the member come up for other charges.

In the summer of 1988, the department set up two substations in Leuders and Gonzales Parks, "giving the parks back to the people". The substations had an officer present from 8:30 AM to 12:30AM, and responded to calls within a 12-block radius. Also present in the substation were security guards and a community services officer. The substations were a success at lowering the crime rates and lauded by citizens.

===== Ivory's Retirement =====
As part of a "golden handshake" deal with the City Council, officers with twenty years of service or more were offered retirement with full pension. Ivory participated in this arrangement and took early retirement in 1990. The City Council appointment former chief James Carrington as interim head of the department during the candidate search.

==== City of Compton code enforcement officers ====
In the 1980s under the auspices of the department, city code enforcement officers were issued weapons. According to the city website, "As is the case in many cities, the Code Enforcement function in Compton has, at various times in its history been housed in the Police Department. It was through this police affiliation that the Code Enforcement Officers were initially provided City-issued weapons." The authority to carry weapons by the code enforcement officers was revoked in 2014.

=== 1990s–2000 ===
Terry R. Ebert took command of the department in 1990. He served as a Compton police officer for 23 years, including allegedly being involved in a scandal as a detective that brought into question his abilities as an officer. In April 1993 he was charged with grand theft for stealing $5,000 from the police department's drug enforcement "buy" money, and forced to resign. According to the LA Times, "The $5,000 he is accused of stealing was kept in a locked...box for use by officers in drug stings. The box was kept in a locked cabinet in Ebert's office and Ebert had the only keys." Pending an audit of the department, Ebert "had a property officer take money from the police vault and replace the missing money". An anonymous caller tipped off the city controller, resulting in the charges against the Chief. He eventually pleaded "no contest", facing a maximum of 3 years sentence.

Placed on administrative leave during the investigation, Ebert announced his retirement in August 1992. Hourie L. Taylor, having filled in for Ebert since the first day of the Rodney King Riots in 1992, formally stepped in as Chief of police at Ebert's retirement.

==== Surging Crime Rates ====
The number of homicides, having doubled between 1984 and 1989, dropped from 84 to 78 for 1990. The rate would drop again for 1992 (58), rising slightly in 1993 (62) before dramatically increasingly again for 1994 (81) and 1995 (79). According to the Uniform Crime Reports and Index of Crime, Compton had a significant number of violent crimes during the 1980s and 1990s:

In December 1995, the Santa Cruz Sentinel reported that "Police took to the streets in force...after the mayor [Omar Bradley] declared a state of emergency and cancelled police days off to stop a wave of murders and drive-by shootings. Since late August, gang gunfire has killed or wounded at least eight youngsters in Compton." Taylor noted there had been 79 homicides in 1995.

Year	Population	Murder/ Man- slaughter	Rape	Robbery	Aggravated Assault	Total Violent Crime
2000	93,493	45	38	544	898	1,525
1995	96,962	79	45	840	826	1,790
1990	90,454	82	115	1,227	1,719	3,143
1985	90,657	57	140	1,157	1,178	2,532
1980	79,261	56	117	1,052	969	2,194

==== 1992 Los Angeles riots ====
Compton was one of the cities in which riots and civil disturbances surrounding the acquittal of LAPD officers involved in the arrest and beating of Rodney King occurred.

From the May 7, 1992 Los Angeles Times detailing the chronology of the riots and Compton Police Department involvement:

Wednesday:

- About 7 p.m.: As night fell, Compton Police received the first riot-related call: looters at Bill's Food Market, 133rd Street and Wilmington Avenue. Ten officers responded in five cars and dispersed the crowd. There were no arrests. At 7:42, after police had left, vandals returned and torched the building. Bill's Market, destroyed by fire, became the first casualty of rioting in Compton.
- 8:15 p.m.: A Compton policeman, responding to reports of looting in the 1300 block of East Peck Street, shot at a fleeing suspect who appeared to pull a gun. The suspect escaped. (On Sunday afternoon, police arrested a man driving a stolen vehicle and discovered a bullet wound in his thigh. The officer who fired the shot Wednesday night identified the driver as the looting suspect.)
- 8:30 p.m.: Fires erupted in at least half a dozen businesses scattered throughout the city, and callers jammed 911 emergency lines with reports of fires, looting, fights, shots fired and noise. On Compton Boulevard, looters struck Blake's Jewelry and Loan pawnshop and neighboring Gus's liquor store. Police arrested 20 people. Merchandise was scattered throughout the stores and outside. "They were all laughing. I couldn't believe it," Lt. Steve Roller said.
- 11:15 p.m.: Police crisscrossed the city in futile attempts to respond to looting and vandalism at store after store. Orange glows from scattered fires lit the night sky. During a hastily called City Council meeting, officials declared a local state of emergency in response to widespread looting and arson. Council members imposed a dusk-to-dawn curfew but with little immediate result.

Thursday:

- Just after midnight: The emergency switchboard was completely lighted up by incoming calls and would remain that way for hours.
- 2:30 a.m.: Sam Chung, one of many Korean business owners in Compton, was awakened by the phone in his Cerritos home. Looters had broken into his Compton Boulevard market. Residents near the building kept it from burning, but several adjacent markets also owned by Koreans were not so fortunate.
- 9 a.m.: City officials assessed the damage from the night of terror: 43 buildings destroyed or damaged by fire, 87 buildings looted or vandalized, $12 million in estimated property damage. Police announced they had made 141 arrests. No deaths related to the riot were reported.
- 11 a.m.: Mayor Walter Tucker III canceled the city's Cinco de Mayo celebration. The mayor, other council members and other city leaders appeared on the local public-access cable TV channel to pray for peace.
- Late morning: Vandalism continued to spread. Entire strip malls were looted and burned. Merchandise was strewn ankle-deep in some parking lots. Ministers and civic leaders issued appeals for calm.
- 12:30 p.m.: An unidentified man was shot by police officers near the corner of Rosecrans and Chester avenues. Police are investigating the shooting.
- 2:30 p.m.: Thanh Lam, 25, was shot to death while driving down Alondra Boulevard with a pickup truck filled with cases of beer. Witnesses said the assailants were blacks who screamed racial epithets at the driver before shooting him.
- 3 p.m.: Looters broke into the Pep Boys store at 1900 Long Beach Blvd., ignoring police officers guarding the J. J. Newberry department store a few feet away. Police attempted to arrest some looters, but the stealing continued. "At that point I knew we had completely lost control of the city," police Lt. Roller said. "As I drove back to the station--with lights and sirens going--the street was filled with pedestrians who refused to get out of the way. They were pointing and laughing at me."
- 6 p.m.: National Guard troops were scheduled to arrive but did not appear until Friday morning.
- Throughout the night: Looters and arsonists continued their rampage. Incidents were so voluminous that police and fire officials, working 12-hour shifts, were overwhelmed and had difficulty recalling specific incidents and when they occurred.

Friday:

- Early morning: Reinforcements arrived: 275 National Guard troops, 150 deputies from San Diego County and 45 law enforcement officers from various cities gathered at a staging area at the city-owned Ramada Inn.
- 10 a.m.: Eighty officers in more than 40 patrol cars rolled out of the staging area with sirens screaming to respond to a report of looting at the Family Ranch Market on South Long Beach Boulevard. As they headed down Artesia Boulevard, citizens on the sidewalks applauded the show of force.
- Late morning: The troops and deputies scattered on patrols throughout the city. Riot-related incidents dropped significantly, Roller said.

Two people were killed, 98 businesses and 63 other buildings were destroyed in Compton during the riots.

===== 1993 Death of Officers Burrell and MacDonald =====
On the night of February 22, 1993, at about 11 p.m., Compton Police Officer Kevin Michael Burrell, 29, and Reserve Officer James Wayne MacDonald, 24, made a routine traffic stop in Compton, at the intersection of Rosecrans Avenue and Dwight Avenue, on a red 1992 Chevrolet 454 pickup truck being driven by Regis Deon Thomas. As the officers exited their patrol car and approached the pickup truck, Thomas exited his vehicle and opened fire on both officers. Both officers were knocked down to the ground by bullet wounds to their limbs, despite wearing bulletproof vests. According to trial testimony, Thomas shot at their heads execution-style. Both officers were wearing bulletproof vests and were found lying face down near their patrol car with their guns holstered. There were nine spent nine-millimeter shell casings in front of the patrol car. Burrell died of multiple gunshot wounds to the arm, face, left foot, and head. MacDonald was also shot four times, in his left armpit, middle back, upper back, and behind the right ear, and died of a gunshot wound to the chest. Thomas was tried, convicted and sentenced to death.

==== 1997 "Blue Flu" Strike ====
After contract negotiations stalled in June 1997, approximately ten percent of the 138 members of the department called out sick. CPOA noted that they did not authorize the strike.

==== Chief Hourie Taylor ====
During his tenure as chief, Taylor and the department were embroiled in multiple controversies and much contention with the mayor, Omar Bradley. According to an internal investigation:

What the investigators noted as even more shocking is that when the Compton Police's Internal Affairs Division forwarded a case regarding these matters to the district attorney against then-Compton Police Chief Hourie Taylor – whose locker they said contained two kilos of the missing 60 kilos taken from the 1992 drug bust – the case was rejected by Deputy D.A. Kerry White. This is the same deputy D.A. who prosecuted [Mayor Omar] Bradley…According to page 49 of the report, Taylor told the investigators that the 60 kilos of dope were turned over to the FBI. The FBI told investigators they had no record of it. The investigation report includes copies of the logs which people must sign before they enter the Compton Police Department's narcotics vault. It shows that Chief Taylor entered the vault 2,700 times between 1992 when the drugs went into it and 1999 when they were reported missing.

Following these allegations, Taylor and his second in command Captain Percy Perrodin were placed on administrative leave in August 1999. In response to this removal and ultimate termination, in February 2000 the CPOA held a "no confidence" ballot for the mayor and city manager. It won with overwhelming support from the association, with claims of low morale and politicization of the department.

==== Mayor Omar Bradley ====
The firing of Taylor and Perrodin were part of a larger ongoing contentious relationship between the department and Mayor Bradley. The CPOA planned to attend a city council meeting to present their "no confidence" vote, but the meeting was cancelled. Around fifty officers staged a protest over the cancellation, picketing with signs stated "Stop the Corruption" and "No More Omar". During the following city council meeting, ten Compton officers arrived while it was in progress. Officers claim that there was a coterie of bodyguards for Bradley, and a scuffle ensued between the officers and the bodyguards. The mayor's office responded that the bodyguards were only private supporters, and the officers refused to leave the meeting at the request of the major. Four officers were suspended over the meeting.

==== Last Chief of Police ====
Ramón Allen, Sr. was a 30-year veteran of the department and its last Chief. As the ranking captain at the time of Taylor's administrative leave in August 1999, he was appointed to the position of acting chief, by Compton City Manager John Johnson.

The Juvenile Behavioral Health Services Division was created by Allen to respond to scenes of violent crime and provide mental health services to victims, family members, and other individuals necessitating such on-scene services.

In 2000, the department had 150 sworn officers and 70 civilian employees with a budget of $18.9 million.

== Controversies ==
=== 1888 – Asbury McComas ===
After an investigation of some widely circulated allegations, a special meeting of the city board of trustees was held on December 31, 1888, and formal charges were filed against Asbury McComas. The board had concluded that the Marshal was not turning license fees and dog taxes over to the City Treasurer as he was legally bound to do. He was asked to pay up and resign, which he did shortly thereafter. Records do not indicate whether he ever turned the taxes over to the city.

One history of Compton, referring to the appointment of the first City Marshal, Police Judge and Street Superintendent, states that bonds of up to $5,000 were fixed for "principal officers". It is not clear whether McComas was included among these, but if so, that would have been a means for the city to recoup its funds.

McComas was reappointed in 1892 to the Marshal's position, to "fill the vacancy caused by the failure of F.H. Carson, the constable recently elected, to qualify".

=== 1924 – World War I Veterans abuse allegations ===
In October 1924, the LA County grand jury investigated charges against Compton officer F.E. Carpenter and other officers for the "mistreatment" of World War I veterans. Paul Dalton, a disabled vet was shot at by Carpenter when he refused to stop for a traffic violation. Other disabled veterans, E.C. Wilson and Henry Engbarth, also testified that Wilson was "beaten by a police officer at Compton without cause".

=== 1934 – Attacks on Communism ===
In 1934, the City of Compton and the Police department actively engaged in a "war on communist agitators". In May 1934, Compton Police arrested Thomas W. Patterson, a vocal communist for violation of the "Criminal Syndicalism Act". He was "forcibly removed from the stage...by officers after he assertedly advocated overthrow of the United States Constitution". In June of that same year, a protest against Patterson's arrest lead to violent clashes between Compton Police, LASD and protestors. Law enforcement officers used water hoses to disperse the crowds, which later would be described as a "riot".

The city council passed stringent laws against anyone suspected of trying to organize citizens with possible communist sympathies. According to the Los Angeles Times, "The City Council last night placed additional power in the hands of the police by adopting emergency ordinances making illegal the conduct of street meetings and parades without special permits". Chief Potter organized a "special detail" of fifty "citizen police". This detail was issued with night sticks and tear gas.

=== 1933–1936 – "War of the Chiefs" ===
In 1933 newly elected Compton Mayor Clifton S. Smith announced significant (and contentious) changes to the city department heads, including Chief West. In October 1933, West was replaced by Thomas J. Potter. By July 1935, after a troubled stint as Chief of Police of Long Beach, West had been reappointed as Chief. In August 1935, the LA Times reported "Compton Loses Move in Police Chief Fight", with the Superior Court siding against Mayor Smith and the city in declining to dismiss ousted Chief Potter's request for reinstatement.

The reinstatement of West lead to major dispute between Smith, the city council and the police department, colloquially known as the "War of the Chiefs". According to the LA Times:

The feud between the two has been approaching the boiling point ever since Smith was elected Mayor in 1933. At that time he ordered the City Manager to remove the Chief which was done. In the meantime, a new City Manager went into office and he reappointed West...a civil service proposal was defeated by the voters at an election last January [1936] which aided the Police Chief in claiming his salary. However, Thomas J. Potter who was appointed to succeed west in 1933, has refused to give up the post with the result that Compton has been served by two police chiefs since West was reappointed in July of last year, A.B. Gridley, the new city manager, reappointed West.

By April 1936, the LA Times noted that the leadership of the Compton Police Department had descended into chaos, stating "the whole file concerns the question: Which of the two Chiefs – Chief West or Chief Potter – really is entitled to the job?" Smith refused to sign paychecks for West, with neither Chief drawing a salary since July 1935. Later that same month, Smith and West engaged in a physical altercation that put West in the hospital in critical condition and charges for both Smith and West. At this same time, the city council appointed an acting chief, Wayne Wright, that the Mayor also refused to acknowledge. At the end of the month of April at a city council meeting, West's daughter and son-in-law Harold Derfelt were involved in another physical altercation, resulting in further charges for all parties involved. All charges were eventually dropped between the Mayor, West and the Derfelts.

July 1936 saw the District Court of Appeals authorizing the reinstatement of Potter as chief, however City Manager Gidley refused to acknowledge this, stating "the decision has no bearing on the Police Department now". The resolution for the "War of the Chiefs" finally came in October 1936, with a Superior Court writ of mandate ordered the City Council to formally reinstate Potter, with back pay to August 1935. West served fifteen months as Chief without pay.

=== 1955 – Carmen Loyd ===
Superior Court Judge H. Burton Noble rejected a confession of a burglary suspect Carmen Loyd, citing "dungeon" like conditions in the Compton City Jail. Noble noted that Loyd had been held for four days in solitary confinement. The cell was a windowless nine by twelve foot room, with limited air supply, no water or toilet and a lightbulb outside the cell that was lit continuously. Noble stated "The day of the screw and the dungeon have passed – I thought it had – but apparently it hasn't. I'm not going to accept any confession made by a defendant after incarnation in a hole like that." Chief Ingram responded that Noble "had never seen the cell", and that an unannounced inspection of the facility by two members of the LA County Grand Jury and an investigator from the District Attorney's Office determined "the jail was up to par" and "equal or better than any jail facility in Los Angeles County". Ingram however did advise that a "foolproof and injury-proof" toilet were being installed, and that a fresh coat of paint was also scheduled to be applied.

=== 1977–1979 – Investigator Saul Lankster ===
Saul Lankster served with the department for nine years, most of which was fraught with controversy and contention. In 1971, he was one of the leaders of the "Blue Flu" slowdown. That same year, he leveled allegations that the city council published a list of names and address of Compton officers, leading to several assaults and home ransacking's. He was also involved in the fighting between the CPOA and the Guardians in 1976, claiming "...the CPOA ceased to be a labor organization. It's become a club wherein the dissident members are not given a right to have their say". Lankster clashed with the city again when he unsuccessfully ran for Congress in 1976, contesting a city charter rule that required him to take a leave of absence from his job with the department while running for office.

Charges were brought against Lankster in March 1977 for allegedly using "excessive and unnecessary force" in four separate instances against teenagers. Chief Rouzan requested the Los Angeles County District Attorney investigate Lankster, with a department insider noting "The fact that it has been submitted to the DA should tell you something". The charges were not brought about by the four teenagers, rather it was reported from within the department. After a six-month investigation, the grand jury proceeded with charges, with at least a half-dozen witnesses providing testimony. In November 1977, the DA declined to file charges against Lankster.

Simultaneous with the grand jury inquiry, Lankster was terminated from the police department on charges of "theft of public funds and falsification of police records". Rouzan noted that Lankster submitted false overtime pay requests.

Lankster fired back at Rouzan and the department in February 1978 by filing an $8 lawsuit over his "ruined reputation" after his firing. Lankster was granted unemployment benefits from the state, which the city appealed and lost. January 1979 found the City Council upholding Lanksters termination. An appellate court upheld the termination in 1981 while Lankster was unsuccessfully running for Mayor of Compton.

=== 1978 – Officer James Allen Perry ===
Officer James Perry shot Robert Anderson, security guard for Compton Unified School District in the home of Anderson and his fiancé, Gwendolyn Baker. The off-duty incident was initially classified as "self-defense" by Compton Police but Chief Rouzan, in an effort at transparency, referred the case to the Los Angeles County District Attorney for further investigation. The DA's office uncovered evidence indicating that it was not in self defense, and brought charges against Perry and Baker, charging Perry with murder and being an accessory after the fact.

=== 1981 – Luis Velasquez ===
In January 1981, sixteen-year-old Luis Velasquez was riding with two others in a vehicle that was engaged in a high-speed pursuit with Compton officers. Once the car stopped, he reportedly failed to heed commands of the officers to raise his hands. Velasquez, unarmed, "moved suddenly and the officers shot him". The LA County DA initially cleared officers Brett Garland and Jasper Jackson of any wrongdoing in the incident, stating that the two shots fired by Garland and the single shot fired by Jackson were justifiable, and that they "committed no criminal offense...the actions of both officers were proper and justified under the law concerning justifiable homicide and self-defense."

In August of that same year, the DA admitted that they made several "factual errors", and instructed the Special Investigations Division (SID) to reopen an inquiry. Gilbert Garcetti, head of the SID noted the initial report "contained a number of errors and some conflicts between evidence cited and the reports conclusions". Velasquez's mother filed a $1.5 million wrongful death suit against the city over the death, citing "substantial inconsistencies".

By October 1981, the second inquiry again cleared the officers of any blame, with additional information included from three un-interviewed witnesses of the incident.

In 1992, an LA Superior Court ruled in favor of Luis Velasquez's family, awarding them $2.3 million (eventually lowered to $1.6 million) for the wrongful death of a minor. The jury noted that the autopsy report indicated that the teen had been shot three times, once in the back of the head, once in the back of his leg and once in his forearm. Both officers were dropped from the suit, and remained on the force

In the book Vice: One Cop's Story of Patrolling America's Most Dangerous City, the authors contend that Velasquez was a notorious gang leader of the Lime Street Hoods. They go on to assert that Velasquez died after being involved in a gang-related drive-by shooting in "1982", and that he "jumped out of his car and began firing at the officers". They also allege that Velaquez's gang "put a hit out on Officer Garland". These allegations are directly contradicted by court documents, eyewitness reports and contemporary news reports.

=== 1983 – Anthony "Fatso" Amey ===
During a routine call in 1983, Anthony "Fatso" Amey was attacked and beaten by Compton officers, who claimed that Amey attempted to reach for one of their service weapons. The department reported that "Amey...died of a head wound during a struggle for control of the pistol belonging to Officer M. Davis". Witnesses claim that Amey possibly ran when the police approached, and "they caught him in the street and starting hitting them with their night sticks...everyone at the party was seeing how bad they was beating him, so they started running up on the police and throwing bottles at them, trying to get them off Fatso". Others noted that after Amey escaped from an initial attempt at handcuffing, the officers continued to beat him. In the scuffle, officers drew their weapons and fired into the air in an attempt to calm the situation, eventually ending with a single shot to Amey's head. The department issued a statement contradicting these events, stating that Davis was defending his life. The internal investigation declared that were no issues with the shooting, and it was referred to the DA for further review.

The death of Amey highlighted the frustration and growing gulf between the police of Compton and the citizens they were sworn to protect.

=== 1991 – Taulaulelei Brothers ===
In 1991, two Samoan brothers, Pouivi and Italia Taulaulelei were shot and killed by Compton officer Alfred Skiles, Jr. Police accounts state that the brothers attacked the officer and attempted to take his weapon, after which the officer shot the brothers multiple times (reports vary from 19, 20 or 21 shots). Family members dispute this account, stating that there was no struggle and that the brothers were unarmed and that the officer emptied his weapon and stopped to reload before continuing to shoot. Pouvi was shot eight times in the back, and Italia five times in the back. Skiles faced two counts of manslaughter charges in the shooting, pleading innocent.

Highlighting the growing discord between the department and the citizens of Compton, in November 1991, the COPA held a picnic in support of the officers. The family's lawyer, Kevin McLean stated "From the Samoan community standpoint, I'm sure it will be considered bad taste. But they've had to endure police brutality for a good many years".

After the jury was deadlocked 9–3 in favor of acquittal and Judge John H. Reid denied the DA's attempt at a second trial. Skiles was never convicted.

This incident was discussed in the US House of Representatives at that time, highlighting the need for investigation into police conduct in Compton and other California agencies.

The family of the brothers filed a civil lawsuit against the City of Compton, eventually settling for between $4 and $6 million in 1994.

=== 1991 - Charmagne Evon Drew ===
In early 1992 Drew, a 14-month veteran of the department, was accused of grand theft of money from motorists that she had stopped. The four separate incidents, taking place in August and November 1991, saw Drew allegedly stopped Spanish-speaking people for traffic violations, and taking hundreds of dollars from their wallets. A sting operation conducted by the department (utilizing an officer from a different department) caught Drew, she was fired from the department and charged.

After being convicted of three counts of grand theft, Drew was eventually sentenced to a year in county jail.

=== 1994 – Felipe Soltero ===
The FBI and the LA County grand jury investigated an alleged beating of 17-year-old Felipe Soltero by Compton officer Michael Jackson in July 1994. A 59-second video of the incident was recorded by a neighbor and played on KNBC-TV, spurring the investigation. Only portions of the incident were videotaped, showing Jackson "lunging at the youth and striking him at least six times with his baton", with the attack continuing "even after the youth falls to the ground". Witnesses claim that prior to the start of the recording, "Soltero attacked Jackson, wrestling with him for several minutes before the officer drew his baton and beat and kicked the youth".

Chief Taylor, after viewing the tape, remarked "I was surprised, certainly. I was shocked. I'm not saying his actions were incorrect...but I wasn't expecting it". Taylor rebuffed calls for his resignation. Jackson was never charged with the beating, with the prosecutor citing "lack of evidence". The family filed an unsuccessful lawsuit against the city and the department.

=== 1997 – Long Beach Officer Brian Watt ===
In 1997 a weapon, booked into evidence at the Compton station as evidence in 1986 and subsequently stolen, was reportedly used in a shooting of a Long Beach police officer Brian Watt. Officers Reginald Wright, Sr. and Reginald Wright, Jr., with known connections to Death Row Records, were with the department at the time the weapon went missing. They were deposed as part of an investigation of corruption, and are suspected to have taken the gun from evidence, provided it to Death Row Records, where it then ended up on the street and was used in the Long Beach shooting.

=== 1999 - Ed'ourd Peters ===
Patrol officer Ed'ourd Peters was arrested and fired after being accused of having unlawful sex with a 14-year old runaway while on duty. Peters, a nine-year veteran of the department at the time, had criminal charges dismissed after the victim failed to show at court hearings.

=== 1999 – Internal Affairs report ===
In a 2013 article in the Lost Angeles Wave former Compton Mayor Omar Bradley discussed a confidential Internal Affairs' Division investigation from 1999. This 95-page report uncovered missing narcotics (including cocaine, PCP and marijuana) and weapons. Bradley alleged that his 2004 conviction was in retaliation for his attempts to "take on" corruption in the department.

=== 2017 – Missing weapons ===
In 2017, city officials offered a $10,000 reward for information relating to 31 missing firearms from storage. It is unclear if the weapons belonged to the former department, disarmed Code Enforcement officers, or as part of equipment purchased during an attempted reestablishment of the department. All of the 198 weapons were accounted for during a March 2017 inventory, however when the city transferred the weapons to the LASD in August 2017, 31 weapons were missing. According to retired LASD commander Charles Heal, "It is fair to say, it was likely an inside job", noting that "few people probably knew about the storage of the firearms, and the vault combination had probably remained the same for decades". The Alcohol Tobacco and Firearms department took charge of the investigation.

As of 2018, the weapons were still missing.

=== Connections with Death Row Records ===
Compton Officer Reginald Wright, Jr. was heavily involved with Death Row Records, being employed as head of security and eventually CEO after leaving the department. Wright's father, Reginald Wright, Sr., was also a member of the Compton Police Department in the gang enforcement, and was still working with the department while his son was employed by Death Row Records and running Wrightway Security. Off-duty officers from multiple Southern California departments, including Compton, were employed as guards by Wright's firm.

Wright, Sr. moved to the LASD at the time of the closure of the department in 2000. Former Mayor Omar Bradley claimed there was no difference between Death Row Records and Compton Police..."they functioned as one entity" once Wright, Jr. became involved with the label.

=== Shooting of Tupac Shakur ===
Speculation places Wright, Jr. as having heavy involvement with the death of rapper Tupac Shakur, and that his and his father's former role as an officer with Compton impacted ongoing Compton (and subsequent LASD) investigations. Chief Taylor removed Wright, Sr. from the Shakur shooting investigation over these concerns.

Both Wright, Sr. and Wright, Jr. were charged in 2017 of multiple drug offenses.

In 1998, the weapon used to murder Tupac Shakur was found in a backyard of a Compton resident. The weapon was booked into evidence, and at the time LASD absorbed the Compton department, it (along with 3,800 other weapons) were transferred to LASD custody.

== Disbandment ==
With a troubled legacy of racial tensions, public conflict with the city council, and questionable conduct by officers, governing authorities had considered disbanding all local emergency services (police and fire) several times. The 1974 Grand Jury report on jail conditions noted that Compton could greatly benefit from merging with the LASD. In 1978, City Manager Allen Parker stated "It is a consideration for budgetary reasons", noting that the city could save upwards of $1 million against a budget of $9 million for the 268 person department. Chief Carrington, in a 1985 press conference, stated "Every two years we go through this sheriff's thing", in response to yet another call for LASD's assumption of policing.

Unified Crime Report (UCR) statistics for 1997 - 2000 indicated problems with the performance of the department:

a 44.6% homicide clearance (national urban average = 61.2%), 12.8% robbery clearance (national urban average = 27.6%), 28.4% clearance for assaults (national urban average = 55.4%), 6.2% for theft (11.2% national urban average), 7.6% for burglary (11.9% national urban average), and 9.0% for larceny (21.9% national urban average). CPD clearance rates for rape were still lower (36.3% compared with 39.8%), though more consistent with national averages.

After a spate of eight murders in ten days in July 2000, and with the below average UCR numbers, the City Council, in a contentious attempt to come to grips with increasing crime rates, voted (with one "no" vote by council member Marcine Shaw) to disband the department. City spokesperson Frank Wheaton stated "The crime rate has surpassed the Compton Police Department's ability to control". The LASD was granted a $12.3 million contract (the most expensive of the 41 cities they served) to assume law enforcement responsibilities. Sheriff Lee Baca extended an offer to any eligible Compton officer to join his department, with most of the 113 officers receiving conditional offers. Chief Allen opted to retire after 31 years of service, refusing an offer to remain with the city in an executive position.

Opponents of the disbandment cite the move as politically motivated, driven by Bradley and his ire with the department over officers involvement in a recall campaign against him.

Often referred to as Compton Police Department's transition chief of police, Allen vocally opposed the assimilation of the department by the Los Angeles County Sheriff's Department. Research indicated that the county's proposal for contractual services to the city was a gross underestimation of personnel and equipment requirements for a full-service police department.

After the disbandment of the Police Department in August 2000, the Juvenile Behavioral Health Services Division morphed into the Compton branch of the Weed and Seed Program under the direction of the United States Department of Justice.

A 2018 report by the Dolan Consulting Group also suggested that changing demographics of the Compton were in also part of the dissolution of the department. The city of Compton was 88% Caucasian in 1950, but by 1970 it was 70% African-American. By the 1990s, African-Americans held a majority of city government positions (including the police force). However the city demographics had then moved to a majority of Hispanic and Asian-American residents, which once again did not reflect the makeup of the city employees.

In September of 2000, four former officers filed a civil rights lawsuit against the city of Compton, Mayor Bradley and the former chief Allen. The suit alleged that during a city council meeting discussing the disbandment of the department, the four officers received retribution for appearing at the meeting and voicing their opinions.

== Attempts at re-establishment ==
In 2004 an advisory vote occurred for the City of Compton. "We the qualified electorate of the City of Compton support the reestablishment of the Compton Police Department" was placed on the ballot as "Measure D". In a vote of 32% yes to 67% no, the vote was defeated. This advisory vote was supported by then mayor Eric Perrodin (a former Compton officer and gang unit investigator) at the cost of $50,000.

In 2008, the City Council approved a no-bid contract with former Chief Rouzan for $984,500 for a study on the re-establishment. This study reported that the city could re-establish an 85-person department over 18 months at a cost of $18 million. Compton residents who opposed the re-establishment believed the report to be flawed, as it was conducted by a former officer. Approximately $1.3 million of this money was also used to purchase police radios.

During budget talks in 2009, $11.2 million for the Compton Senior Center and $8.7 million for a parking structure were re-allocated for a possible reestablishment of the department. Mayor Perrodin stated:

I do not believe that the Sheriff's Department, because of its size is the best law enforcement agency for the citizens of Compton. … There has not been a two-way street. The Sheriff's Department tends to tell you and dictate to you how things are going to be. They are non-responsive to not only my needs but to the needs of the citizens of Compton.

In the summer of 2010, the City Council formally voted 3–2 to authorize the city manager to reestablish the department. Sheriff Baca advised the Council that "I believe the Compton Police Department could come back, I also say that in order to do this with the financial stability that is necessary, you probably shouldn't do it now". Baca and the LASD further noted that "the county pumped more than $20 million in station-level and countywide services into policing Compton, including access to the county's special units such as the arson and homicide bureaus, beyond the $17.8 million the city paid the sheriff's department for its services last year." While supporting the reestablishment of a department, City Manager Willie Norfleet also privately noted that "If the city is unable to pay the sheriff's contract on time next fiscal year, this will be a major indicator that the city will not be able to pay the salaries and other expenses of the Compton Police Department." The Sheriff Department claimed that Compton was regularly behind paying for services rendered, being $5.7 million in arrears in 2009, and $6 million in 2010. Compton residents reactions were mixed at idea of reestablishing a department, with much of the support coming from former Compton officers.

A December 2010 vote by the city council to secure funding did not pass, making the reestablishment of the department unlikely.

On March 8, 2011, Perrodin withdrew the proposal due to lack of support from his council colleagues, and by April 2011 the City Council rescinded their vote of 2010 to re-establish the department due to funding concerns.

In June 2020, residents of Compton lead a protest of over 5,000 people against alleged police brutality by the LASD in Compton. According to the LA Sentinel City Council was considering the establishment of an 11-member Law Enforcement Review Board to independently evaluate allegations of misconduct.

In September 2021 after whistleblower allegations, the City of Compton filed a lawsuit against the LASD. In the lawsuit, City Attorney Damon Brown alleged "breach of contract, intentional misrepresentation, negligent misrepresentation, concealment, false promise and unfair competition". This lawsuit extends retroactively to the start of the LASD providing services for Compton, with the city believing that the LASD inappropriately billed Compton for services never rendered to the city.

== See also ==
- List of law enforcement agencies in California
