= The Thin Blue Line =

The thin blue line is a colloquial term for police forces. The Thin Blue Line or Thin Blue Line may also refer to:

== Films ==
- The Thin Blue Line (1966 film), a documentary film by William Friedkin about the police and the problems they encounter
- The Thin Blue Line (1988 film), a documentary film by Errol Morris concerning the murder of a police officer

== TV series ==
- The Thin Blue Line (American TV series), a 1952 American panel show produced by LAPD Chief William H. Parker
- The Thin Blue Line (British TV series), a 1995–1996 British sitcom set in a police station
- Thin Blue Line (Swedish TV series), a 2021 Swedish police drama series set in Malmö

== Other uses ==
- Thin Blue Line, a 2009 NASA side-view photograph of Earth's atmosphere

== See also ==
- Blue Line (disambiguation)
- Long Blue Line (disambiguation)
- The Thin Red Line (disambiguation)
- Thin Blue Line Act, or H.R. 115, a U.S. law passed in January 2017
- Thin Blue Line flag, a symbol used by Blue Lives Matter and far-right movements
