= Blue Lives Matter =

Countermovement in the United States

- Thin blue line flag, commonly associated with the Blue Lives Matter movement
- Formation: 2014; 12 years ago
- Founders: Active and retired law enforcement officers
- Founded at: New York City, New York, U.S.
- Type: Social movement
- Location: United States

Blue Lives Matter (also known as Police Lives Matter) is a countermovement in the United States that aims to show solidarity with law enforcement. It emerged in 2014 in direct opposition to the Black Lives Matter movement and gained traction following the high-profile homicides of NYPD officers Rafael Ramos and Wenjian Liu in Brooklyn, New York. Supporters of Blue Lives Matter have called for crimes committed against police officers to be classified as hate crimes.

Critics have said that, while being Black is an inherent characteristic, being a police officer is a choice, and that police officers are already respected in most communities. They add that attacking or killing a police officer already carries a higher penalty than attacking a non-police officer in most states. Brutality against police officers during the January 6 United States Capitol attack by Blue Lives Matter supporters has fueled further accusations of hypocrisy, especially following Donald Trump's pardon of January 6 United States Capitol attack defendants on the first day of his second presidency.

== History ==
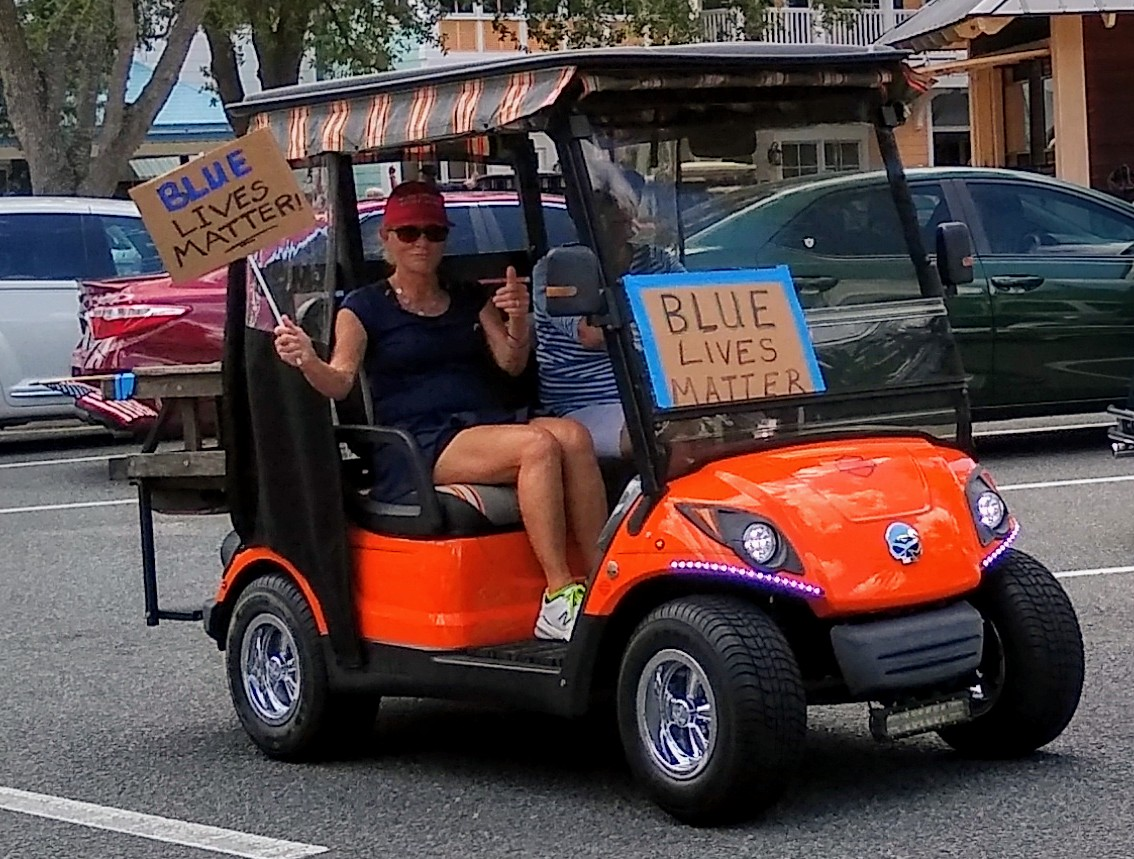
A golf cart participating in a Blue Lives Matter rally held in The Villages, Florida, in June 2020

On December 20, 2014, in the wake of the murder of Rafael Ramos and Wenjian Liu, a group of law enforcement officers formed Blue Lives Matter to counter media reports that they perceived to be anti-police. Blue Lives Matter is made up of active and retired law enforcement officers. The current national spokesman for Blue Lives Matter is retired Las Vegas Metropolitan Police Department Lieutenant Randy Sutton.

In September 2015, over 100 Los Angeles police officers took part in a Blue Lives Matter rally in Hollywood to "show support for the department at a time when [...] the ambush killings of police officers in cities elsewhere have left authorities across the nation feeling under siege".

== Legislation ==
=== Louisiana ===
The Blue Lives Matter movement led to a state law in Louisiana (HB953) which made it a hate crime to target police officers, firefighters, and emergency medical service personnel. The Louisiana law, passed in May 2016, makes it a hate crime to target police officers or firefighters. The legislation, authored by state Representative Lance Harris, was signed into law by Governor John Bel Edwards. The law allows for hate crime felonies to carry an additional $5,000 fine or five years in prison, while hate crime misdemeanors to carry an additional $500 fine or six months in prison.

The ACLU and others, including supporters of enhanced penalties for crimes against police officers, have opposed the bill. The law has also been criticized for weakening the impact of the Hate Crimes Act by adding categories of people who are already better protected under other laws and characterized by their career choice instead of people persecuted for lifelong personal characteristics they cannot choose such as race, sexual orientation, and gender identity. That police deaths are decreasing overall has also led some to question the need for such laws.

== Criticism ==
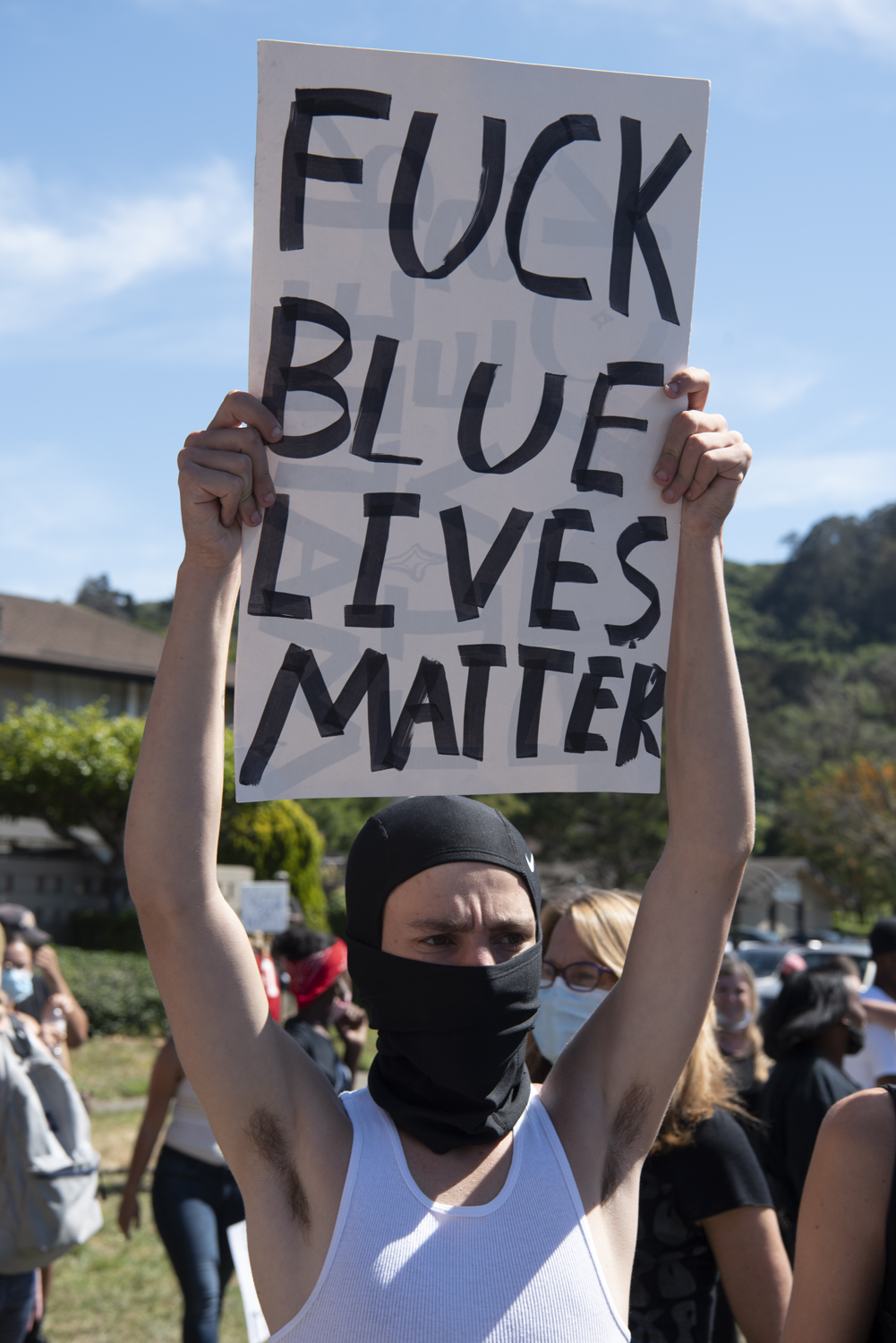
A sign criticizing Blue Lives Matter at a Black Lives Matter protest

Critics of Blue Lives Matter state that one's job does not have the deep identity significance and source of solidarity that one's racial identity can, and that Black identity and history is constantly under threat of erasure while police officers do not face this threat. Another source of criticism is the belief that African Americans in urban areas are unfairly suspected of being thieves and freeloaders, while police officers are typically respected and honored in communities. Some state that supporters of Blue Lives Matter are intentionally or unintentionally supporting a system of discriminatory policing and racial profiling.

Some critics of Blue Lives Matter laws state the laws are redundant as attacking or killing a police officer would already result in a harsher punishment than attacking a non-police officer.

Others, such as St. Martinville Police Chief, Calder Hebert, say these laws will make resisting arrest a hate crime, which has drawn criticism as hate crimes are crimes in which victims are targeted because of identity-based characteristics such as race, sexual orientation, or gender. According to FBI data, violence against police officers, as well as crime in general has decreased without these laws; calling into question their necessity.

Frank Rudy Cooper, an expert on the intersectionality of identities and policing, wrote that the Blue Lives Matter movement is essentially an extension of the blue wall of silence, and the newest manifestation of police resistance to criticism.

=== Violence against police by Blue Lives Matter supporters ===
Following the January 6 United States Capitol attack, many have called the Blue Lives Matter movement hypocritical, as many rioters showed support for Blue Lives Matter despite assaulting United States Capitol Police (USCP) and Metropolitan Police Department of the District of Columbia officers. Harry Dunn, an African-American USCP officer, spoke of officers being beaten with Blue Lives Matter flags.

In an opinion piece for The New York Times, Charles M. Blow opined that Blue Lives Matter "was never really about the protection of officers, generally speaking, but about allowing officers to treat with more impunity the people who protested the maltreatment of Black people". In her opinion piece for The Washington Post, Karen Attiah referred to Blue Lives Matter as "a bald-faced, hypocritical lie", noting that Capitol rioters brutally attacked African-American police officers such as Eugene Goodman. Writing for Mother Jones magazine, Nathalie Baptiste concluded that "Blue Lives Matter has never actually been about supporting law enforcement. It's been about trafficking in this implicitly racist message: What really matters is supporting police brutality against Black people and BLM protesters."

Trump's pardon of January 6 United States Capitol attack defendants—who collectively assaulted at least 174 police officers—on the first day of his second presidency led to further speculation about the sincerity of his and other Republicans' support for Blue Lives Matter.

== See also ==
- ACAB
- All Lives Matter
- Blue wall of silence
