= Draganflyer X6 =

General information
- Type: Miniature UAV
- Manufacturer: Draganfly Innovations
- Designer: Draganfly Innovations
- Status: In production (2014)

History
- Manufactured: 2008–present
- Introduction date: 2008

Draganflyer X6 is a commercial unmanned aerial vehicle.

== Description ==
Draganflyer X6 is a remote-controlled miniature helicopter that allows users to control it to a maximum height of 8,000 feet (2,400 m). It allows for a fixed altitude to be set. The helicopter is mounted with a camera that can collect up to five hundred gigabytes of real-time recording data. It can be set to record at 1080 HD, low-light vision and thermal vision. The camera is mounted on the vibration-free bottom of the drone. The Draganflyer has six rotors and can fly up to a speed of 20 miles per hour (32 km/h).

The drone is controlled by a single operator with a handheld controller. The controller wears glasses, which display a live feed of what is recorded by the camera.

== Privacy concerns ==
The drone is in use in Canada and the United States by law enforcement.

In Seattle, the use of the Draganflyer X6 by police was prohibited by mayor Mike McGinn due to protests from privacy advocates and the general public. The drones would have been used in missing persons cases and in limited criminal investigations, according to police.

In May 2014, the Los Angeles Police Department obtained two of the drones as a gift from the Seattle Police Department. An official from the police department stated that the drones would only be used in limited cases such as hostage situations and that they would not be used to spy on law-abiding citizens. However, this did not stop criticism from the American Civil Liberties Union, which questioned whether the marginal benefits of the drones justified their serious threat to privacy. On October 31, 2014, Los Angeles City Council instructed Los Angeles Police Department to create a drone policy in order to move forth with using their Draganflyer X6.

In February 2014, the Federal Aviation Administration allowed the Grand Forks, North Dakota police department to start using the drone. The University of North Dakota, in an attempt to preemptively solve objections regarding privacy, created a committee of private citizens and members of the government with the power to alter or completely stop the drone flights. However, the actual testing was met with little objection from the public.
