= Operation Cul-de-Sac =

Los Angeles Police Department crime reduction effort

Operation Cul-de-Sac (OCDS) was a Los Angeles Police Department effort to reduce violent crime, particularly drive-by shootings by gangs. It consisted of installing concrete barriers, later iron fencing, to block fourteen residential streets to vehicle traffic. During the two years it was in effect, it substantially reduced violent crime.

== History ==
In Los Angeles, the Los Angeles Police Department (LAPD) noticed that gang violence was higher in some neighborhoods. LAPD hypothesized that this was related to rival gang fighting for territory to sell drugs. They determined that 80–90% of drive-by shootings occurred on streets near the edge of the community, which offered a quicker escape due to proximity to major roads and highways. LAPD targeted fourteen of these streets near traffic arteries, installing permanent vehicle barriers beginning in February 1990. The barriers were initially concrete, but were replaced by iron gates that could be unlocked for emergency access. All the barriers were in an area of about 1 sq mi (2.6 km^{2}) near Jefferson High School. In addition to vehicle barriers, ten officers patrolled the area on bicycles.

Funding for the project was reduced in 1991, and OCDS ended in December 1991. By 1992, most of the iron gates were damaged to the point that they no longer stopped vehicle traffic.

== Effects and reception ==
OCDS dramatically lowered assault and homicides, resulting in a 20% reduction in 1990 and 14% reduction in 1991 compared to levels in 1989. There was no clear evidence of crime displacement, meaning OCDS prevented crime rather than shifting it to other neighborhoods. After the removal of the barriers, violent crime rates rose to their previous levels. OCDS also had a positive effect on truancy, increasing attendance at Jefferson High School by around 200 students daily.

In 1991, the Los Angeles Sentinel published a commentary that was critical of OCDS, saying that it existed, in part, to create a network of informants, and that "virtually any part of life behind the walls will be subject to invasion, involvement, and control by the LAPD."

== See also ==
- Operation Hammer (1987)
