= Operation Hammer (1987) =

Initiative of the Community Resources Against Street Hoodlums

Operation Hammer was a large scale effort by the Los Angeles Police Department, led by Chief of Police Daryl Gates, to crack down on gang violence in Los Angeles from 1987 to 1990. The initiative was conducted by the Department's anti-gang intelligence unit, Community Resources Against Street Hoodlums (C.R.A.S.H.) and primarily consisted of large, recurring raids in areas known for gang activity. At the height of this operation, in April 1988, 1,453 people were arrested and 70+ suspects were shot dead in shootouts with 1,000 police officers in South Central Los Angeles (now South Los Angeles) in a single weekend — the most arrests of black Angelenos since the Watts Riots in 1965. Only 103 of those arrested were charged with a crime. That year, there were approximately 20,000 arrests made during sweeps made as a part of Operation Hammer.

The operation came at a time when gang violence in Los Angeles was approaching an all-time high. Gang activity began to stir in the 1960s and 1970s with the formation of Bloods and Crips, but ballooned in the 1980s due to economic recession and the burgeoning crack epidemic. LA's gang war quickly became infamous, and the homicide rate amongst young black Angelenos quadrupled during the 1980s. Operation Hammer was part of a broader "tough on crime" wave of the late 20th century, which also included sentence enhancements and so-called three-strikes laws.

Only 10% of arrests through Operation Hammer resulted in criminal charges, but the majority of suspects arrested were assumed to be gang members and added to a database that accumulated more than 100,000 names. Those arrests that did result in charges were often for minor offenses, such as delinquent parking tickets and curfew violations. Nonetheless, all those arrested had their names and addresses added to the database as potential gang members. At one point, nearly half of black men between 21 and 24 were in the LA County gang database.

The operation was short-lived due to widespread concerns about racial profiling and the constitutionality of the searches. Raids resulted in such significant property damage that some residents were given temporary shelter by the Red Cross. Affected residents were later awarded $3 million in compensation. By Operation Hammer's end in 1990, more than 50,000 people had been arrested in associated raids.

== Background ==
The formation of the Bloods and the Crips in Los Angeles is considered the start of contemporary street gangs. The two came into conflict in the early 1970s and engaged in frequent skirmishes in the South Central area. As a result, violent crime in South-Central Los Angeles exploded; between the 1980s and the 2000s, an estimated 10,000 Los Angeles youths were killed by gang conflict. In response, LAPD employed harsh gang suppression tactics.

In preparation for the 1984 Olympic Games held in Los Angeles, the LAPD cracked down on gang activity in the city. Under the supervision of Gates, the LAPD expanded gang sweeps for the duration of the Olympics, which were implemented across wide areas of the city but especially South Central and East Los Angeles.

After the games were over, the LAPD began to revive the enforcement of old anti-syndicalist laws to maintain the security policy instigated by the Olympic games. Mass arrests of black youth became more common, even though the overwhelming numbers of people arrested were never charged. Citizen complaints against police brutality increased 33 percent in the period 1984 to 1989.

After a group of people at a birthday party were shot down on their front lawn in a drive-by shooting in April 1987, Chief of Police Daryl F. Gates responded with a roundup of gang members.

Operation Hammer was also propelled by the murder of Karen Toshima on January 30, 1988, in Westwood, where she was caught in the crossfire of a gang related shootout, although not being the intended target. This was seen as a major milestone in the LA gang war. Previously, the violence had been largely confined to neighborhoods claimed as gang territory. Violence in Westwood, a major retail and entertainment hub, was an aberration that alarmed public officials and the general public. The incident also served to heighten tensions, as the public outcry over her death called some to question why deaths in South-Central LA, where the homicide rate was highest, did not receive the same attention. In the months following Toshima's death, Operation Hammer reached its peak operations.

== Raids ==
Operation Hammer was characterized by "gang sweeps" in which hundreds of LAPD officers would converge on suspected hubs of gang activity. The LAPD aimed to suppress gang activity through displays of force. In addition to arresting suspects, officers would use "any legal justification" to seize as many vehicles as possible in hopes of restricting the mobility of gangs. The plan's architect, then-Chief of Police Daryl Gates, plainly stated that the goal of the operation was to "make life miserable for gang members." If police believed there may be narcotics at the scene, their search methods were aggressive; one officer said:

[I]f you were selling dope, we were going to knock your house down with a battering ram. And we were sure going to dump the sugar on the counter. It was the standard method of operation of the LAPD. We weren’t just searching for drugs. We were delivering a message that there was a price to pay for selling drugs and being a gang member.

Operations costed as much as $150,000 per day. Because so few arrests led to charges, rather than disincentivizing gang activity, being detained was seen by some as a marker of toughness, undermining the mission.

According to the LA Times, August 1, 1988, a large-scale raid by 88 LAPD officers on "two apartment buildings on the corner of 39th Street and Dalton Avenue lead to deadly shootout between LAPD police officers and armed gang member leaving 15 gang members dead, inducing an all-out search for drugs and a massive show of force designed to deliver a strong message to the other gangs." Police caused massive property damage (including smashed furniture, holes punched in walls, and destruction of family photos) and sprayed graffiti messages such as "LAPD Rules" and "Rollin' 30s Die." In addition, "Dozens of residents from the apartments and surrounding neighborhood were rounded up. Many were humiliated or beaten, but none was charged with a crime. The raid netted fewer than six ounces [170 g] of marijuana and less than an ounce [28 g] of cocaine." (Note: Carl E. Douglas commented on this saying: "You wouldn't go to Beverly Hills and do that, even if you thought there was a mafia hangout. Even if you thought it was legitimate.....When you don't live in the community, you don't think of them as human.") In 2001, Officer Todd Patrick said in retrospect, "We weren't just searching for drugs. We were delivering a message that there was a price to pay for selling drugs and being a gang member."

By 1990, over 50,000 people had been arrested in raids. During this period, the LAPD arrested more young black men and women at any period of time since the Watts riots of 1965. Despite the large number of arrests, in April 1988, there were only 60 felony arrests, and charges were only filed in 32 instances. Disputing that figure, Chief Gates claimed that charges were filed on 70% of the suspects arrested.

== Impact ==
The perception that police had targeted non-Caucasian citizens likely contributed to the anger which, after the assault of motorist Rodney King, would erupt into the 1992 Los Angeles riots.

== Criticism ==
Critics have alleged that the operation was racist because it heavily employed racial profiling, targeting black youths.

Chief Gates was asked in a 2001 PBS interview whether the local people in the minority areas expressed thanks to the police:

Sure. The good people did all the time. But the community activists? No. Absolutely not. We were out there 'oppressing' whatever the community had to be, whether it was blacks, or Hispanics. We were 'oppressing' them. Nonsense. We're out there trying to save their communities, trying to upgrade the quality of life of people ...

== See also ==
- Operation Cul-de-Sac
