= The Thin Red Line =

The Thin Red Line may refer to:

== Arts and entertainment ==
- The Thin Red Line (painting), an 1881 painting of the Battle of Balaclava by Robert Gibb
- The Thin Red Line (novel), a 1962 novel by James Jones
  - The Thin Red Line (1964 film), a film by Andrew Marton based on Jones's novel
  - The Thin Red Line (1998 film), a film by Terrence Malick based on Jones's novel
    - The Thin Red Line (soundtrack), a soundtrack album from the 1998 film
- The Thin Red Line (album), a 1986 album by Glass Tiger, or the title track
- "The Thin Red Line" (The Mentalist), a television episode
- "The Thin Red Line", 1966 episode of the British television series Gideon's Way
- "The Thin Red Line", a song by Saxon from the 1997 album Unleash the Beast

== Military ==
- The Thin Red Line (Battle of Balaclava), an 1854 military action during the Crimean War
- Argyll and Sutherland Highlanders, a military unit nicknamed the Thin Red Line
- Regimental marches of the British Army, of the Argyll and Sutherland Highlanders

== Other uses ==
- The Thin Red Line, an emblem representing the camaraderie of firefighters. A similar emblem used for law enforcement; see The Thin Blue Line

== See also ==
- Red Line (disambiguation)
- The Thin Blue Line (disambiguation)
- The Thin Yellow Line, a 2015 Mexican film
