= Jesse Rosenquist =

American police radio dispatcher

- Born: August 26, 1899; Martin, Tennessee, United States
- Died: June 1966; Los Angeles, California, United States
- Occupation: Police radio dispatcher
- Employer: Los Angeles Police Department
- Known for: One of the first police radio dispatchers; voice on CBS radio's Calling All Cars

Jesse Rosenquist (26 August 1899 in Martin, Tennessee, United States – June 1966 in Los Angeles, California, United States) was one of the world's first police radio dispatchers.

A sergeant with the Los Angeles Police Department, he achieved unexpected fame due to the early police radio frequencies being tuned in on home radios, which were hundreds or even thousands of miles away. Furthermore, procedures at the time included an announcement of the dispatcher's name at the end of each broadcast. His offhanded "ROSE-n-quist!" told listeners who he was.

When the CBS Radio Network started their Calling All Cars series (heard in the western United States from 1933 to 1939), Jesse Rosenquist was the voice that producers sought, to add authenticity to their programs. The only surviving audio examples of his dispatching style are the recordings of those shows, but generations of radio, movie and television "dispatchers" were trying to copy Rosenquist's voice and pronunciation. Due to his having become a household name in the 1930s and 1940s—before LAPD radio moved to newer equipment and frequencies—a public safety bulletin in the 1940s or 1950s was often referred to as a Rosenquist.
