= Josephine Serrano Collier =

First Latina woman

Josephine Serrano Collier (March 14, 1922 – February 25, 2014) was the first Latina woman to join the Los Angeles Police Department.

== Early life ==
Collier grew up in Lincoln Heights, Los Angeles.

== Career ==
Collier worked for the Lockeed Corporation building P-38 Ventura fighter planes during World War II.

In 1946, she was one of nine women to be hired by the Los Angeles Police Department. Of these nine women, Collier was the only one of Mexican descent making her the first Latina woman to join the Los Angeles Police Department.

In 1951, she posed as a distressed patient. Dr. Ralph Reed, a practicing physician for 28 years, felt so sorry for her he knocked $20 off his usual $100 abortion fee. Collier paid him in marked bills.

Collier retired from the Los Angeles Police Department in 1960.

== Personal life ==
Collier married fellow officer, Darwin "Jack" Collier. The couple, who had three children, moved to Idaho and later to Arizona where Collier died at the age of 91.
