= Thin blue line =

Figurative reference to the position of police in society

The blue line symbol

The "thin blue line" is a term that typically refers to the concept of the police as the line between law-and-order and chaos in society. Blue refers to the color of many police uniforms.

The phrase originated as an allusion to the Thin Red Line incident during the Crimean War in 1854, wherein a Scottish regiment—wearing red uniforms—famously held off an Imperial Russian Army cavalry charge. Its use referring specifically to the police was popularized by Los Angeles Police Department Chief William H. Parker during the 1950s; author and police officer Joseph Wambaugh in the 1970s, by which time "thin blue line" was used across the United States; and Errol Morris's documentary The Thin Blue Line (1988). In recent years, the symbol has also been used by the Blue Lives Matter movement in the United States, which aims to show solidarity with the police, and a number of far-right movements in the U.S., particularly after the Unite the Right rally in 2017.

== History ==
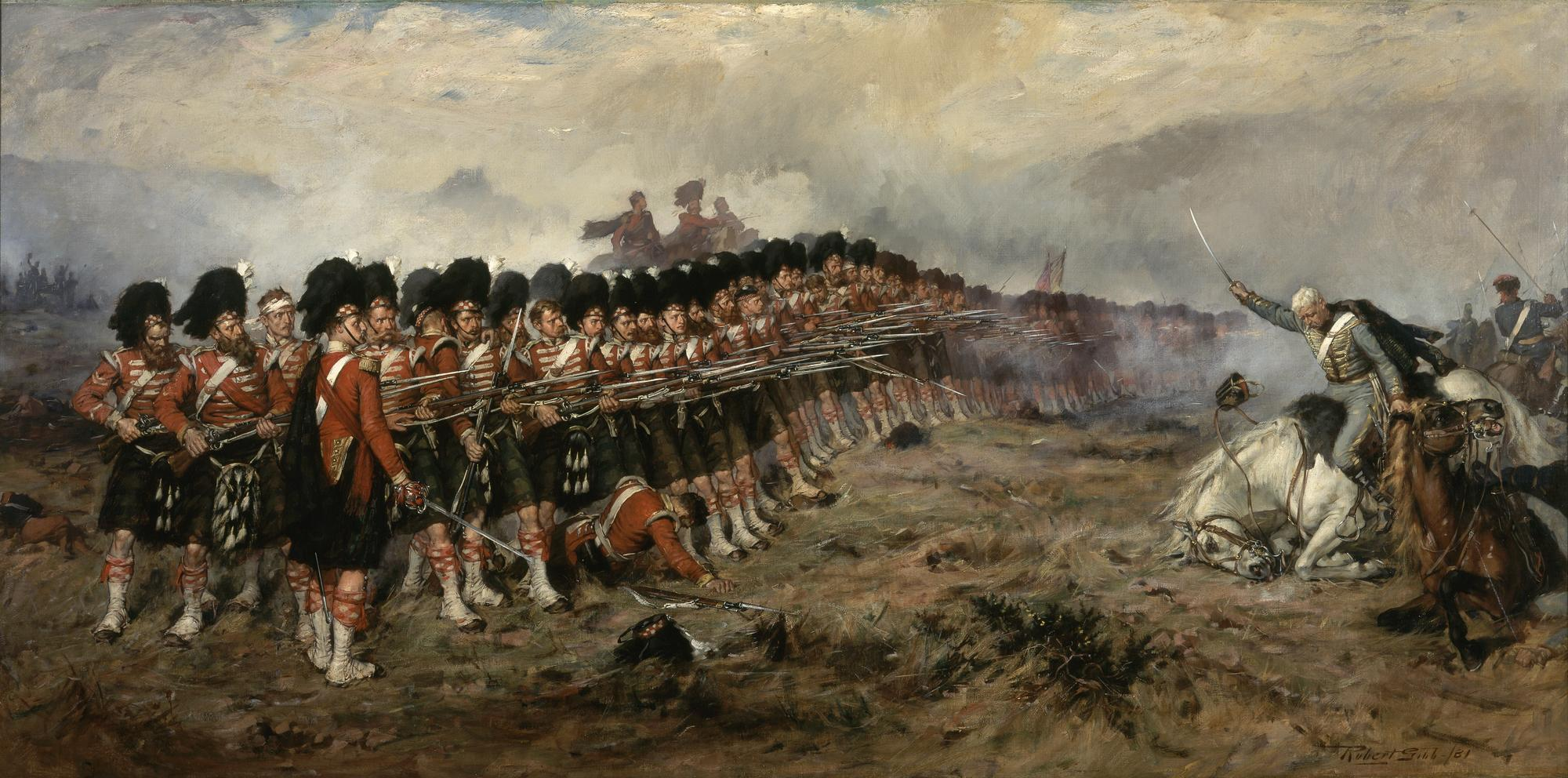
The Thin Red Line, by Robert Gibb (1881)

The term is adapted from the Thin Red Line, an incident of the 1854 Battle of Balaclava during the Crimean War where troops the 93rd Regiment of Foot successfully stood their ground against an Imperial Russian Army cavalry charge. This action was widely publicized by the British press and depicted in several artworks, becoming one of the most famous episodes of the entire conflict. The name is now used for firefighters today.

In the book Lawtalk, James Clapp and Elizabeth Thornburg say the term spread to other professions, e.g., a "thin white line of bishops".

An early known use of the phrase "thin blue line" is from a 1911 poem by Nels Dickmann Anderson, titled "The Thin Blue Line". In the poem, the phrase is used to refer to the United States Army, alluding both to the Thin Red Line and to the fact that US Army soldiers wore blue uniforms from the eighteenth century through the nineteenth century.

It is unknown when the term was first used to refer to police. New York police commissioner Richard Enright used the phrase in 1922. In the 1950s, Los Angeles Police Chief Bill Parker often used the term in speeches, and he also lent the phrase to the department-produced television show The Thin Blue Line. Parker used the term "thin blue line" to further reinforce the role of the LAPD. As Parker explained, the thin blue line, representing the LAPD, was the barrier between law and order and social and civil anarchy.

The Oxford English Dictionary records its use in 1962 by The Sunday Times referring to police presence at an anti-nuclear demonstration. The phrase is also documented in a 1965 pamphlet by the Massachusetts government, referring to its state police force, and in even earlier police reports of the NYPD. By the early 1970s, the term had spread to police departments across the United States. Author and police officer Joseph Wambaugh helped to further popularize the phrase with his police novels throughout the 1970s and 1980s.

The term was used for the title of Errol Morris's 1988 documentary film The Thin Blue Line about the murder of the Dallas Police officer Robert W. Wood. Judge Don Metcalfe, who presided over the trial of Randall Adams, states in the film that prosecutor "Doug Mulder's final argument was one I'd never heard before: about the 'thin blue line' of police that separate the public from anarchy." The judge admitted to being deeply moved by the prosecutor's words, though the trial resulted in a wrongful conviction and death sentence.

According to a 2018 law review article, "thin blue line" also refers to an unwritten code of silence used to cover up police misconduct, also known as the blue wall of silence, a term dating back to 1978.

=== Blue Lives Matter ===
The thin blue line U.S. flag has been banned by some police departments in the United States for its associations with ideologies described as "undemocratic, racist, and bigoted."

The "thin blue line" symbol has been used by the "Blue Lives Matter" movement, which emerged in 2014 as a rebuttal to the Black Lives Matter movement, and gained traction following the high-profile homicides of NYPD officers Rafael Ramos and Wenjian Liu in Brooklyn, New York.

The "thin blue line" has also been associated with white nationalists in the United States, particularly after the Unite the Right rally in 2017, who fly Thin Blue Line flags at their rallies.

The thin blue line US flag has appeared regularly at Trump rallies. The flag, which ostensibly stands for solidarity with the police, also appeared at the January 6 United States Capitol attack, during which police officers were beaten and attacked by the mob of Trump supporters and far right extremists.

Police departments in Madison, Wisconsin, and Los Angeles, California, have banned the thin blue line US flag because of its associations with views and ideologies described as "undemocratic, racist, and bigoted." The Merriam, Kansas, city council voted to ban thin blue line flags from an annual memorial service in remembrance of fallen officers and other first responders.

== Symbols and variations ==
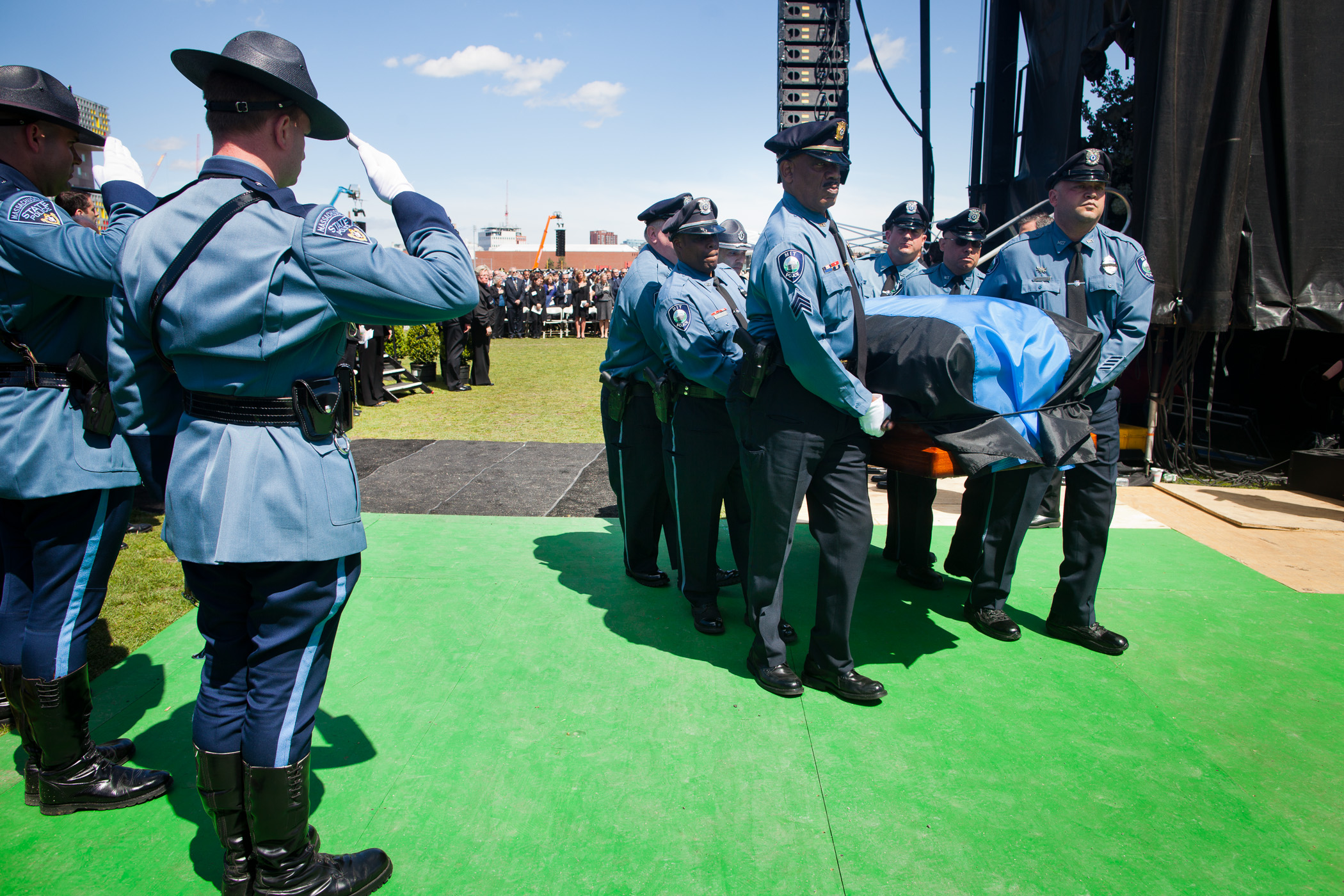
The funeral of Officer Sean Collier, who was shot and killed during the manhunt following the 2013 Boston Marathon bombing. The casket was draped with a "Thin Blue Line" flag.

The "Thin Blue Line" flag is all black, bearing a single horizontal blue stripe across its center. Variations of the flag, often using various national flags rendered in black and white with a blue line through the center, are seen below. The "Blue Lives Matter" movement was created in December 2014, after the homicides of NYPD officers Rafael Ramos and Wenjian Liu in Brooklyn, New York in the wake of the homicides of Eric Garner and Michael Brown Jr. earlier that year and in the context of the greater Black Lives Matter movement.

The skull emblem of the Punisher comics character has become popular within the Blue Lives Matter movement, with many companies producing decals, stickers, and T-shirts featuring the Punisher emblem colored with or alongside the thin blue line. The creator of the Punisher, Gerry Conway, has criticized this usage, saying that police who use the symbol "are embracing an outlaw mentality" and "it's as offensive as putting a Confederate flag on a government building". Conway has also responded by trying to "reclaim the logo" by selling t-shirts adorned with the Punisher logo and Black Lives Matter, with sales going directly to Black Lives Matter-related charities.

The flag was banned by the LAPD from being displayed in public settings in January 2023.

Variations representing professions other than law enforcement exist, such as the "thin red line" flag, representing firefighters, and the "thin green line" representing veterans and active service members of all branches of the US military.

=== National flag variants ===
Australia

Brazil

Canada

Cuba

Finland

Iceland

New Zealand

Switzerland

Ukraine

United Kingdom

United States

=== Other flag variants ===
Hong Kong

Texas

=== Other profession variants ===
Fire Response

Federal Agents (Note: This includes border patrol, park rangers, game wardens and conservation personnel)

Dispatch

Military Personnel (Note: Design is adapted by changing the camo pattern to that being used by the military group.)

Search & Rescue

Corrections Officers

Security Personnel

Nursing

EMS

== Appearances and controversy ==
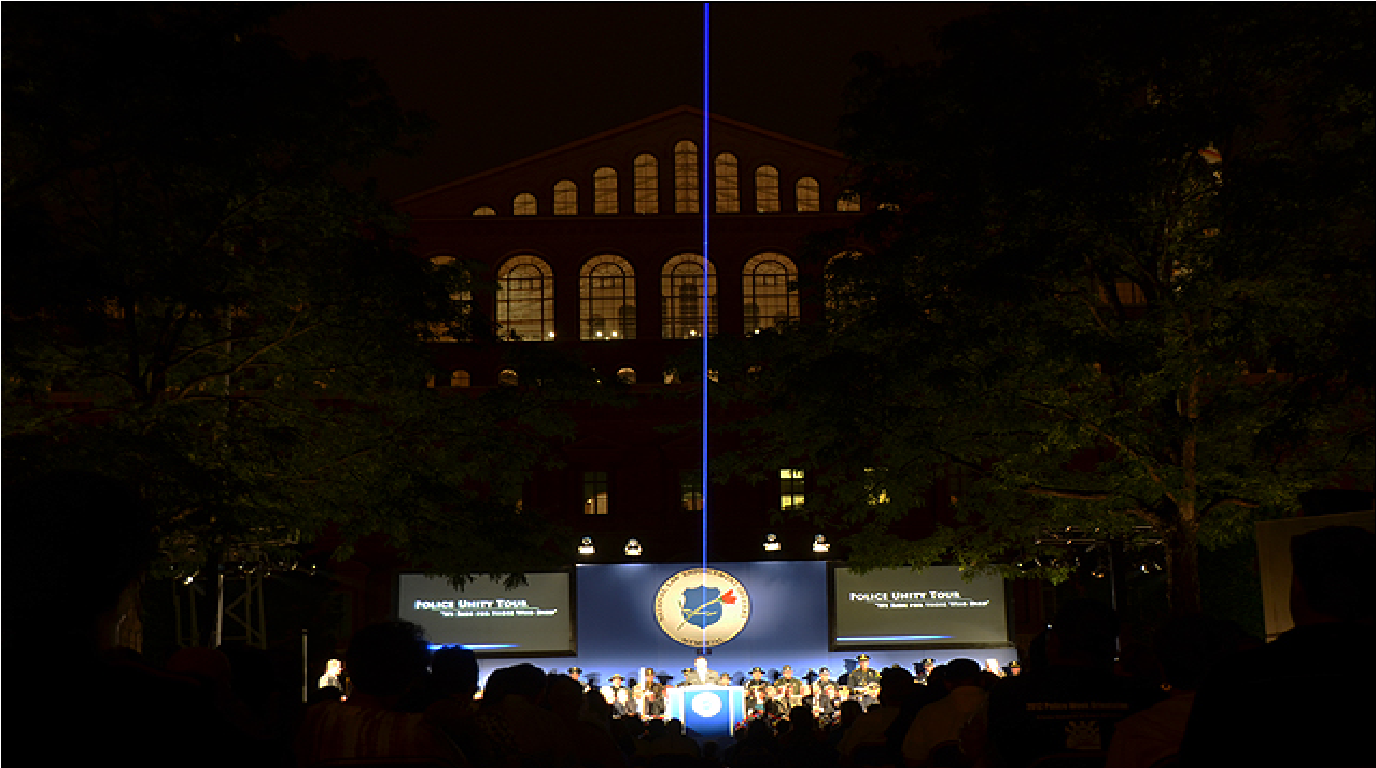
A blue laser beam was projected during the 24th annual National Law Enforcement Officers Memorial on 13 May 2012 in Washington, D.C.

Critics argue that the "thin blue line" represents an "us versus them" mindset that heightens tensions between officers and citizens and negatively influences police-community interactions by setting police apart from society at large. It is sometimes used as a symbol of opposition to the Black Lives Matter movement. The Canadian Anti-Hate Network has stated that it often encounters Thin Blue Line and "back the blue" symbols on social media pages used by hate groups. In the US, white supremacists were documented carrying Thin Blue Line flags alongside the Confederate battle flag and Nazi flags at the Unite the Right rally in Charlottesville, Virginia.

Supporters of the symbol say that it is about paying their respects to law enforcement officers slain in the line of duty, and of officers showing mutual solidarity against attacks by critics, criminals and the general public.

In recent years the use and display of the Thin Blue Line symbol has attracted controversy in several communities.

- In Chicago, in November 2016, counter-protesters carried the black and white US flag symbol to show support for police after the police shooting of Joshua Beal, in opposition to another group of protesters who felt the shooting was unjust and racially motivated.
- In Warwick, New York, the painting of a blue line down a roadway was protested by some citizens as being in opposition to the Black Lives Matter movement. The town has since painted the line red, white, and blue, the colors of the US flag.
- In 2017, Multnomah County Courthouse in Portland, Oregon, removed the flag after it gained notoriety with the Charlottesville demonstrators.
- In July 2019, the "Thin Blue Line" American Flag was put up by residents of York, Maine, as a way to pay tribute to a local police officer who was shot and killed in the line of duty decades earlier. Due to accusations of racism from members of the York Diversity Forum, Charlie Black, the son of fallen State Police Trooper Charles Black subsequently took the flag down.
- On 31 May 2020, the Hamilton County Sheriff's Department in Cincinnati, Ohio, flew the blue line flag in place of the American flag in response to the George Floyd protests. The department tweeted that the original flag had been stolen and the blue line flag flown as a replacement in honor of the Cincinnati Police Department officer shot during the unrest.
- On 30 July 2020, Blue Lives Matter flags were removed from Hingham, Massachusetts fire trucks after days of controversy over whether the flags simply salute police officers or have a more divisive political message. Some townspeople had confused the flag with the genuine "Thin Blue Line" flag.
- In May 2021, the Edmonton Police Association drew criticism for flying a thin blue line flag atop their building. In response, a representative for the police association stated that they didn't "know where and how the symbolism of the blue line flag turned into being considered a racist or hateful type of thing". The police association has refused to remove the symbol.
- In August 2021 the village board of Mount Prospect, Illinois, a suburb of Chicago, voted to remove the thin blue line flag patch from police officers' uniforms. The police chief had stated that the symbol was intended as "a memorial to police officers killed serving their community". However one trustee noted that "this patch is considered racist by many regardless of what the intent is".

== Injunctions against use ==
Since 2015, several jurisdictions have issued injunctions against the use of Thin Blue Line imagery on police uniforms or in other official capacities by emergency services.

=== Canada ===
- On 9 October 2020, the Royal Canadian Mounted Police (RCMP) issued a directive banning the wearing or displaying of symbols related to the Thin Blue Line by officers who are on duty. This directive was opposed by the National Police Federation, the police union that represents RCMP officers. In retaliation, the union ordered Thin Blue Line flags for all of its officers to wear against RCMP orders. On 5 June 2021, RCMP officers engaged in removing protesters at Fairy Creek were criticized for wearing 'Thin Blue Line' patches on their uniforms despite the October 2020 directive forbidding its use.
- In October 2020, shortly after the RCMP directive, the Victoria Police Department in British Columbia banned Thin Blue Line flags from officers' uniforms. The police force in the neighbouring community of Saanich, British Columbia, also confirmed their injunction against police officers applying personalized decorations like the Thin Blue Line flag to their approved uniform.
- In February 2021, the City of Ottawa's police chief implemented uniform standards that would see any alterations, including the controversial "thin blue line" patch, banned from officers' on-the-job attire.
- In May 2021, Toronto police officers were photographed wearing the thin blue line patches on their uniforms while clearing out a homeless encampment at Lamport Stadium. The police officers were reminded that the symbol was not approved by the service's clothing committee or the chief of police. This followed a similar incident in 2020 when a Toronto police officer was ordered to immediately remove a patch featuring a version of the thin blue line superimposed over the black skull symbol used by the Punisher comic book character.

=== Iceland ===
- In October 2020, a photo of an Icelandic police officer was the subject of controversy among the population. In the photo, the officer was wearing a Vinland flag as well as the Thin Blue Line flag overlaid on the Icelandic flag. On 12 May 2021, Minister of Justice Áslaug Arna Sigurbjörnsdóttir issued new regulations that, in part, banned the adornment of these symbols on official police uniform.

=== United Kingdom ===
- In 2015, a number of Sussex Police officers were instructed by their supervisors to remove a badge from their uniforms that consisted of a blue line across a Union Jack on the grounds that it was not part of their official uniform and could be seen as a political statement relating to cutbacks in police budgets.

=== United States ===
- In 2017, following an incident in Riviera Beach, Florida, where a group of police officers flew thin blue line flags on their personal vehicles, an order was issued by their captain to remove the flags.
- In May 2020, officers of the San Francisco Police Department (SFPD) were forbidden from wearing non-medical face masks with "Thin Blue Line" symbols on the job. The SFPD chief of police, Bill Scott, stated that this decision was made "in consideration of concerns some community members have expressed that 'thin blue line' symbolism on some of our officers' face masks may be perceived as divisive or disrespectful".
- On 1 June 2020, the Middletown, Connecticut, Police Chief, William McKenna, made a joint statement along with the mayor of the city, Ben Florsheim, stating that they would be removing the flag from public view at the Middletown Police Department. A change.org petition that garnered over 1,300 signatures for the flags to be removed in wake of the murder of George Floyd influenced the city to make the choice.
- In November 2020, the chief of the University of Wisconsin-Madison Police Department banned use of the flag by officers while on duty on the grounds that the symbol had become associated with 'extremists'. In a statement on 15 January 2021, Chief Roman said that extremists had "visibly co-opted the thin blue line flag".
- In May 2021, the towns of Manchester, South Windsor, Middletown, and Willimantic, all in Connecticut, banned or removed Thin Blue Line flags from their towns. In South Windsor, the flags were removed after the chief of police expressed concerns about displaying the flag. In Manchester, the flags were banned under a new city injunction against banners representing "a particular religious movement or creed," political party flags and flags "that enable violence, discrimination, prejudice, or racism."
- In January 2023, the Los Angeles Police Department banned the use of the flag.

== See also ==
- The Thin Blue Lie, a television film about police brutality in Philadelphia under the mayorship of Frank Rizzo
- Militarization of police
- Blue flu
