= Los Angeles Police Department =

American municipal police department

City of Los Angeles Police Department
- LAPD shoulder patch

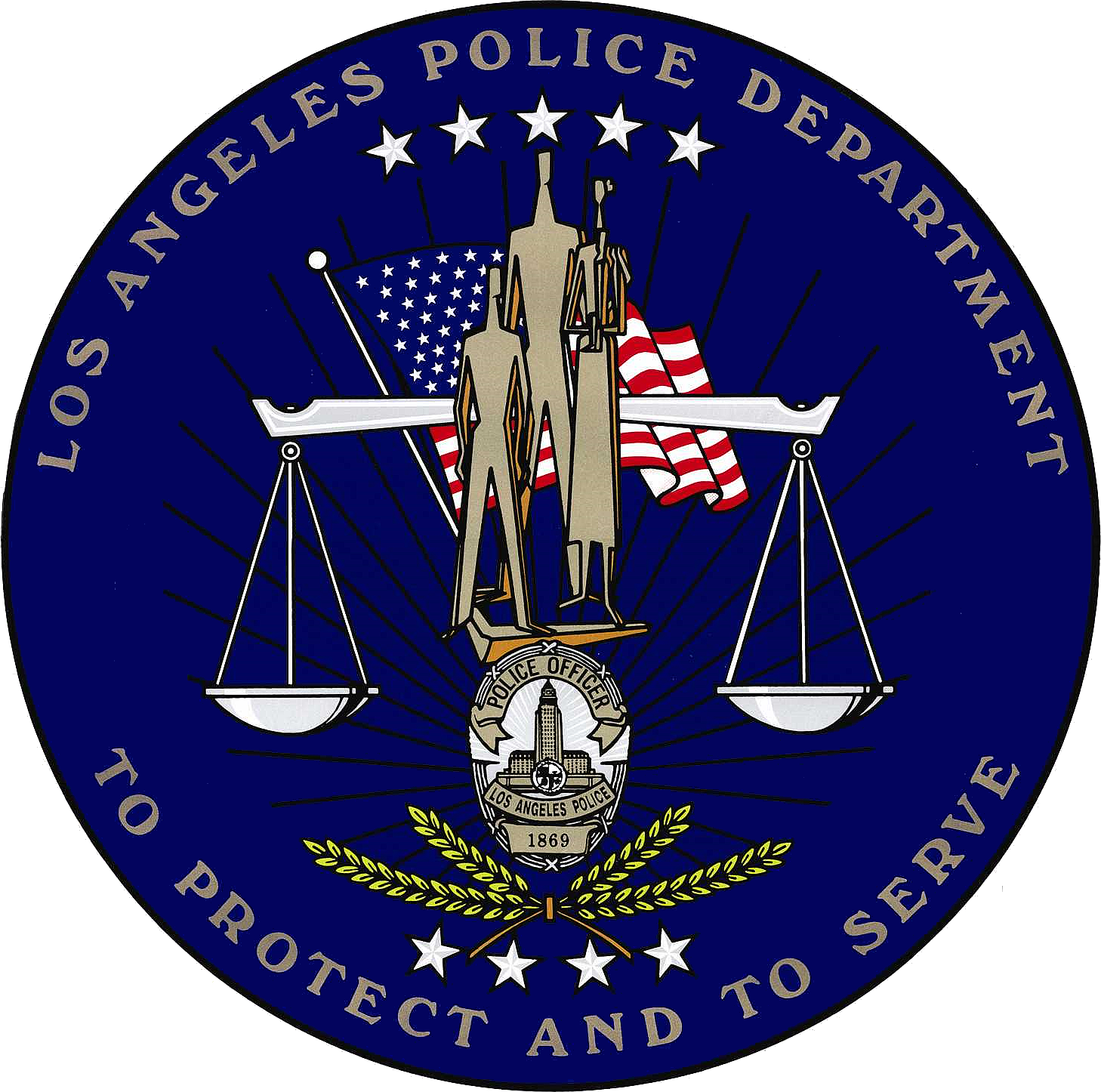
- Seal of the LAPD

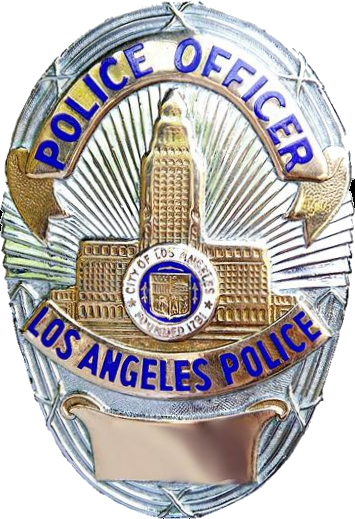
- LAPD officer badge, with number omitted

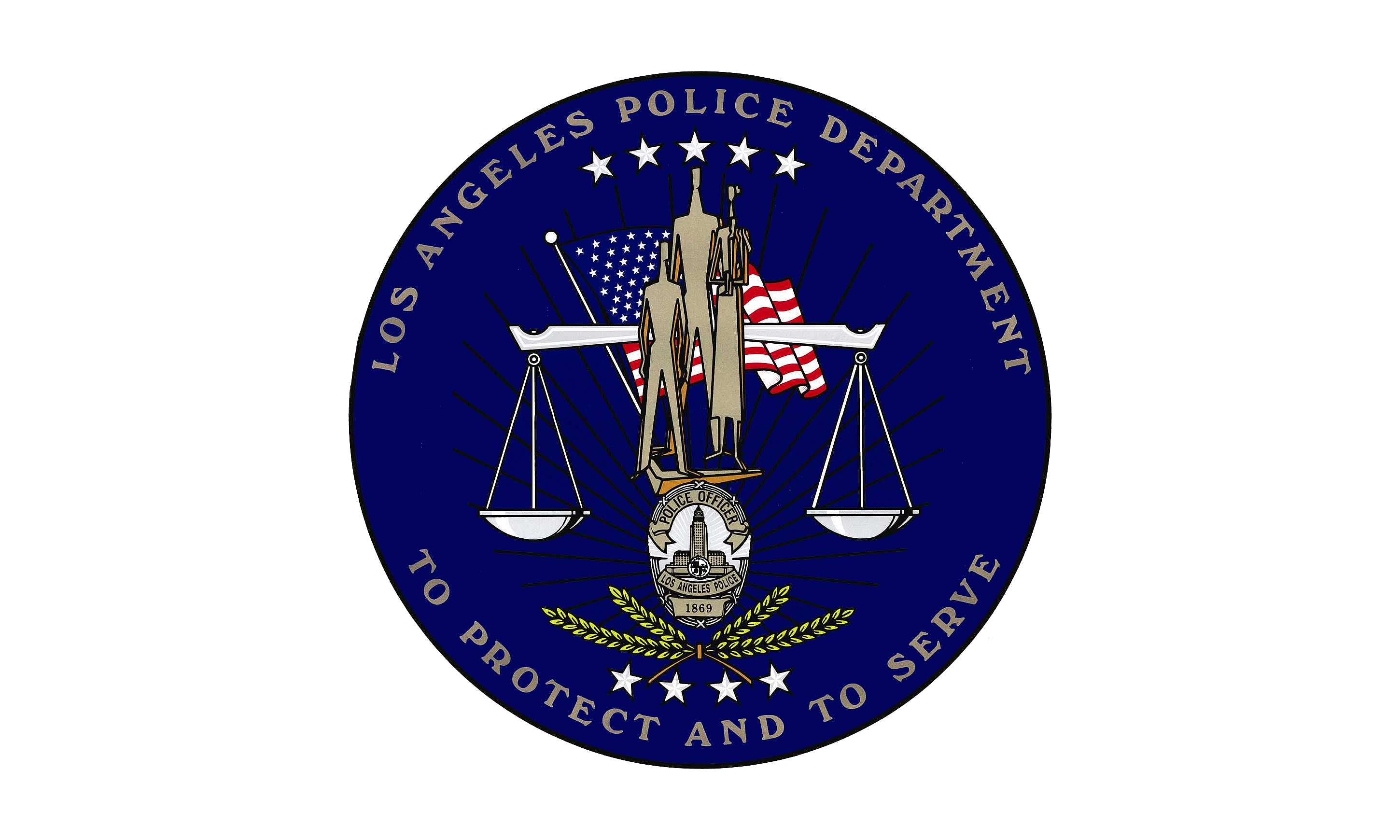
- Flag of the LAPD
- Common name: Los Angeles Police Department
- Abbreviation: LAPD
- Motto: To Protect and to Serve

Agency overview
- Formed: December 13, 1869; 156 years ago
- Employees: About 10,900 funded sworn and civilian positions (2026–27)
- Annual budget: $1.99 billion (2025–26 adopted); about $2.11 billion proposed for 2026–27

Jurisdictional structure
- Operations jurisdiction: Los Angeles, California, United States
- Map showing Los Angeles, the LAPD's primary jurisdiction
- Area: 468 sq mi (1,210 km^{2})
- Governing body: Los Angeles City Council
- Constituting instrument: Los Angeles City Charter, Article XIX
- General nature: Local civilian police

Operational structure
- Overseen by: Los Angeles Board of Police Commissioners
- Headquarters: 100 West 1st Street; Los Angeles, California, U.S.
- Police officers: About 8,555 funded (2026–27)
- Unsworn members: About 2,338 funded civilian positions (2026–27)
- Police Commission presidents responsible: Rasha Gerges Shields, President; Daniel K. Tabor, Vice President; Fabian Garcia, Commissioner; Jeff K. Skobin, Commissioner; Heather Aubry, Commissioner
- Agency executives: Jim McDonnell, Chief of Police; Dominic Choi, First Assistant Chief / Chief of Staff; Emada Tingirides, Assistant Chief, Director of Office of Operations; Michael Rimkunas, Assistant Chief, Director of Office of Special Operations; Timothy "Scott" Harrelson, Assistant Chief, Director of Office of Support Services; Brian G. Maxey, Director, Constitutional Policing and Policy Bureau
- Geographic areas: 21 community police stations

Facilities
- Vehicles: More than 4,700
- Helicopters: 17 at full capacity
- Fixed-wing aircraft: 1

Website
- Official website

The City of Los Angeles Police Department, commonly known as the Los Angeles Police Department (LAPD), is the municipal police department of Los Angeles, California, United States. It is one of the largest municipal police departments in the country. The city's 2026–27 budget plan provides funding for about 8,555 sworn officers and 2,338 civilian positions.

The LAPD is headquartered at 100 West 1st Street in the Civic Center district. The department divides Los Angeles into 21 geographic patrol areas grouped under four geographic bureaus. Other parts of the LAPD handle investigations, traffic and transit policing, counterterrorism, training, technology, internal affairs, aviation, SWAT, and other specialized work.

Independent commissions, courts, historians, journalists, and government investigations have documented a long history of police brutality, corruption, misconduct, racial discrimination, and problems with accountability within the LAPD. After the Rampart scandal, the United States Department of Justice entered into a federal consent decree with the City of Los Angeles in 2001 over systemic civil-rights and accountability problems. Federal court oversight ended in 2013 after major reforms.

== History ==
The first police force specific to Los Angeles was founded in 1853 as the Los Angeles Rangers, a volunteer force that assisted the existing Los Angeles County Sheriff's Department (LASD). The Rangers were soon succeeded by another volunteer force, the Los Angeles City Guards. Neither the Rangers nor the Guards were particularly efficient, and Los Angeles became known for its violence, gambling, and vice.

The first paid force was created in 1869 when six officers were hired to serve under City Marshal William C. Warren. By 1900, under John M. Glass, there were 70 officers, one for every 1,500 people. In 1903, with the start of the Civil Service, this force was increased to 200. In 1910, Alice Stebbins Wells became an LAPD policewoman with arrest powers. She is widely described as the first woman in the United States appointed to a municipal police position with full police powers. Georgia Ann Robinson began volunteering with the LAPD in 1916 and was formally appointed a policewoman in 1919, becoming the department's first Black policewoman and one of the earliest Black female police officers in the country.

Severe corruption issues within the LAPD and the rest of the city government lasted until the 1940s. In 1933, the Reserve Unit was formed, tasked with crime suppression; it would later evolve into the Metropolitan Division. In 1946, the top-secret Gangster Squad was formed to combat the American Mafia and Los Angeles crime family. During World War II, under Clemence B. Horrall, the overall number of personnel was depleted by the demands of the military. Despite efforts to maintain numbers, the police could do little to control the 1943 Zoot Suit Riots. Horrall was replaced by retired United States Marine Corps general William A. Worton, who acted as interim chief until 1950, when William H. Parker succeeded him, serving until he died in 1966. Parker advocated police professionalism and autonomy from civilian administration. However, the Bloody Christmas scandal in 1951 led to calls for civilian accountability and an end to alleged police brutality. In 1967, Officer John Nelson proposed a specialized tactical unit to then-Inspector Daryl Gates and the department organized the Metropolitan Division's Special Weapons and Tactics (SWAT) program. The LAPD program became highly influential in the development of police tactical teams in the United States, as well as the Special Investigation Section, a highly-secretive tactical stakeout unit. The Watts riots began in August 1965 after a traffic stop and confrontation involving police. The unrest took place against a background of long-standing complaints about discrimination, poverty, housing, employment, and police treatment in South Los Angeles.

Parker also had a long and difficult relationship with the Federal Bureau of Investigation and its director, J. Edgar Hoover. Parker wanted the LAPD to operate with greater independence, while Hoover strongly disliked him and at times limited cooperation with the department. Relations between the LAPD and FBI remained strained for years and were reported to be improving by the early 1990s.

Parker was succeeded by Thomas Reddin, who served as chief from 1967 to 1969. Reddin placed greater emphasis on community relations and tried to make the department more responsive to residents. His successor, Edward M. Davis, continued several community-oriented programs while also emphasizing crime control. When Daryl Gates became chief in 1978, the department again became associated with aggressive tactics, especially its gang and drug enforcement programs. Later accounts of LAPD reform often contrast the Gates period with the department's post-1992 changes.

In the 1970s and 1980s, street gangs became a growing issue in Los Angeles; in response, the LAPD established the Community Resources Against Street Hoodlums (CRASH) gang intelligence unit in 1979, conducting Operation Hammer in 1987. In the 1990s, corruption, and misconduct within the LAPD were revealed to the public: the 1991 Rodney King beating led to the 1992 Los Angeles riots, while the 1997 Rampart scandal led to the disbandment of CRASH. Also in 1997, outgunned LAPD officers in North Hollywood were locked into a lengthy shootout with heavily armed and armored bank robbers, prompting police armament upgrades across the United States. Throughout its existence, the LAPD absorbed numerous smaller police forces in Greater Los Angeles, including the LACMTA Police in 1997 and the Los Angeles General Services Police in 2012. The LAPD has made several attempts to absorb the Los Angeles Airport Police and Los Angeles Park Ranger Division, though all attempts failed or did not proceed, and no mergers have been made since 2012.

== Organization ==
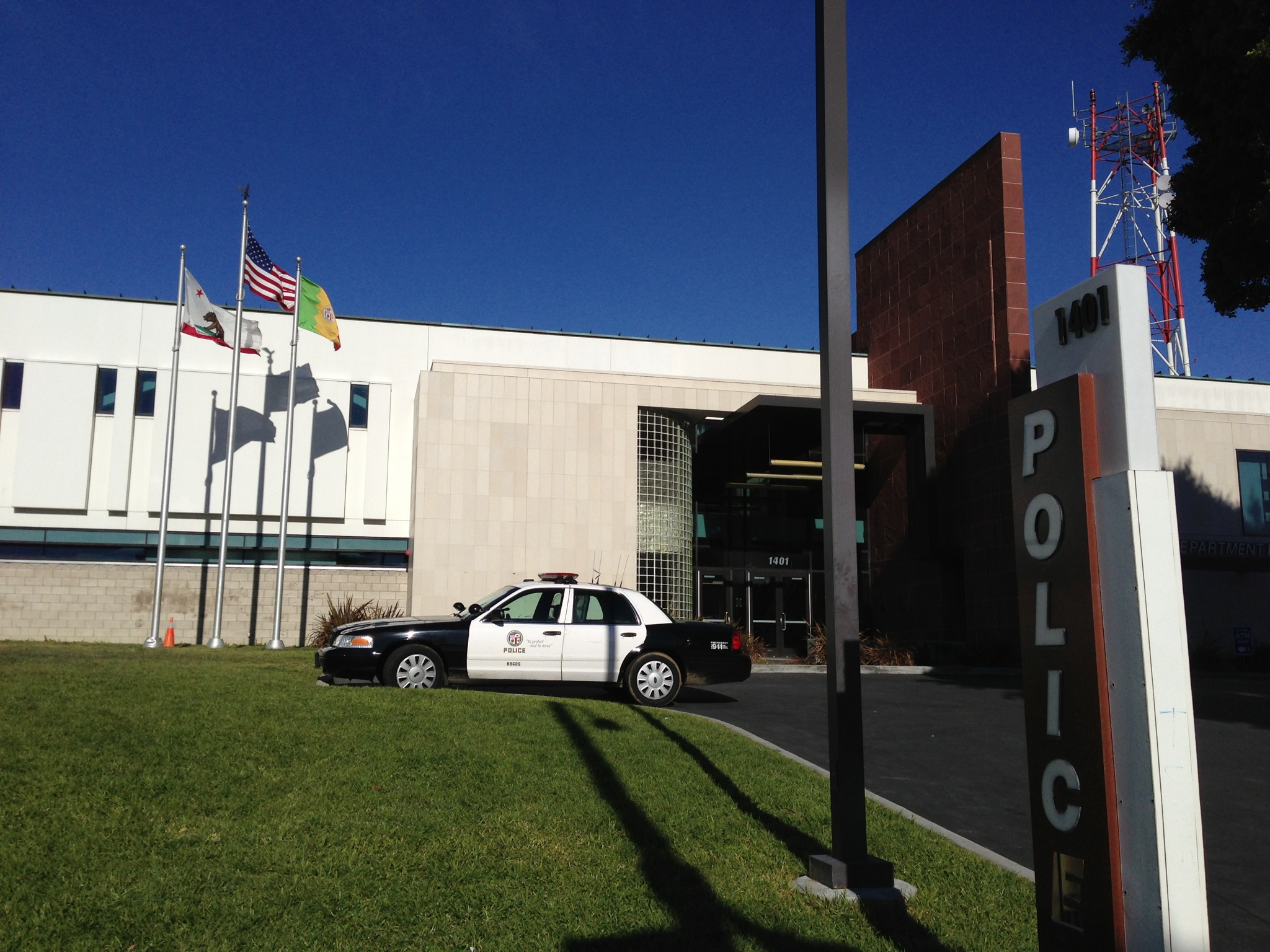
Rampart Community Police Station, one of the LAPD's 21 stations across the city

The Los Angeles Board of Police Commissioners, also known as the Police Commission, is a five-member civilian body that sets policy for and oversees the LAPD. The Chief of Police manages the department and reports to the Commission. As of August 2026, the commissioners are President Rasha Gerges Shields, Vice President Daniel K. Tabor, Fabian Garcia, Jeff K. Skobin, and Heather Aubry.

The Office of the Inspector General (OIG) is an independent oversight office that reports to the Police Commission rather than to the LAPD chain of command. It reviews complaint investigations, discipline, use-of-force cases, and other department practices, and it can conduct audits and special reviews. The current Inspector General is Matthew Barragan, who was appointed in February 2025 and began serving in March 2025.

The LAPD formerly operated an Art Theft Detail that investigated thefts, fraud, forgeries, and other crimes involving art and cultural property. For more than 30 years it was a small specialized unit and recovered nearly $123 million in cultural property after 1993. The LAPD now states that the Art Theft Detail has been discontinued as an investigative specialty. Detective Don Hrycyk was for many years the best-known member of the unit and was described in 2014 as the only known full-time municipal art detective in the United States.

The LAPD Cadet Program grew out of the department's former Explorer Program. In 2009, the Police Commission ended the program's formal relationship with the Boy Scouts of America amid disputes over Boy Scouts membership and leadership rules. The newer program broadened its focus beyond preparing teenagers for police careers. It emphasizes leadership, school performance, citizenship, life skills, tutoring, scholarships, and community service. Cadets take part in ride-alongs, community events, charity work, crowd-management support, and station activities. The program has posts at the LAPD's geographic areas and at several specialized locations. Its membership has changed substantially over time: LAPD publicity reported more than 7,000 cadets in 2016, while a later department page reported about 2,000 in 2020.

=== Office of the Chief ===
The Office of the Chief of Police coordinates the department's senior leadership and supports the Chief in managing policy, communications, personnel issues, and major departmental priorities. Jim McDonnell became the LAPD's 59th Chief of Police in November 2024.

The department's senior structure was reorganized again in 2025. Dominic Choi, who served as interim chief during 2024, is now First Assistant Chief and Chief of Staff. The department also has directors for the Office of Operations, Office of Special Operations, and Office of Support Services, as well as a separate Constitutional Policing and Policy Bureau.

=== Office of Operations ===
The Office of Operations oversees the department's 21 geographic patrol areas and most uniformed field operations. Since 2025 it has been directed by Assistant Chief Emada Tingirides. The 21 areas are grouped into four geographic bureaus: Central, South, Valley, and West.

The current geographic areas are Central, Rampart, Hollenbeck, Northeast, Newton, 77th Street, Southwest, Harbor, Southeast, Hollywood, Wilshire, West Los Angeles, Pacific, Olympic, Van Nuys, West Valley, North Hollywood, Foothill, Devonshire, Mission, and Topanga. Olympic and Topanga opened in January 2009 and remain the two newest geographic areas.

The Office of Operations also oversees the Community Safety Partnership Bureau and coordinates programs dealing with homelessness, youth engagement, and neighborhood policing.

=== Office of Special Operations ===
The Office of Special Operations is directed by Assistant Chief Michael Rimkunas. It includes the Detective Bureau, Counter-Terrorism and Special Operations Bureau, Transit Services Bureau, and Major Events Group. These commands oversee major investigations, specialized tactical resources, counterterrorism, transit policing, and planning for large events.

The Detective Bureau includes units that investigate homicide, robbery, gangs, narcotics, financial crimes, juvenile cases, and other serious offenses. The Counter-Terrorism and Special Operations Bureau includes or coordinates specialized resources such as the Metropolitan Division, SWAT, Air Support Division, Bomb Squad, K-9 units, and other emergency capabilities.

The department has long used CompStat and related crime-analysis systems to review crime patterns and deployment. Former Chief William Bratton brought a version of CompStat to Los Angeles after using the system while he was New York City Police Commissioner.

=== Office of Support Services ===
The Office of Support Services is directed by Assistant Chief Timothy "Scott" Harrelson. Its bureaus and groups cover training, administrative services, information technology, professional standards, personnel, communications, records, custody operations, fleet management, and other functions needed to support field and investigative work.

=== Constitutional Policing and Policy Bureau ===
The Constitutional Policing and Policy Bureau is led by civilian Director Brian G. Maxey. The bureau replaced the former Office of Constitutional Policing and Policy during an August 2025 reorganization. It oversees policy development, audits, legal and risk-management work, strategic planning, and other programs connected with constitutional policing and accountability.

== Headquarters ==
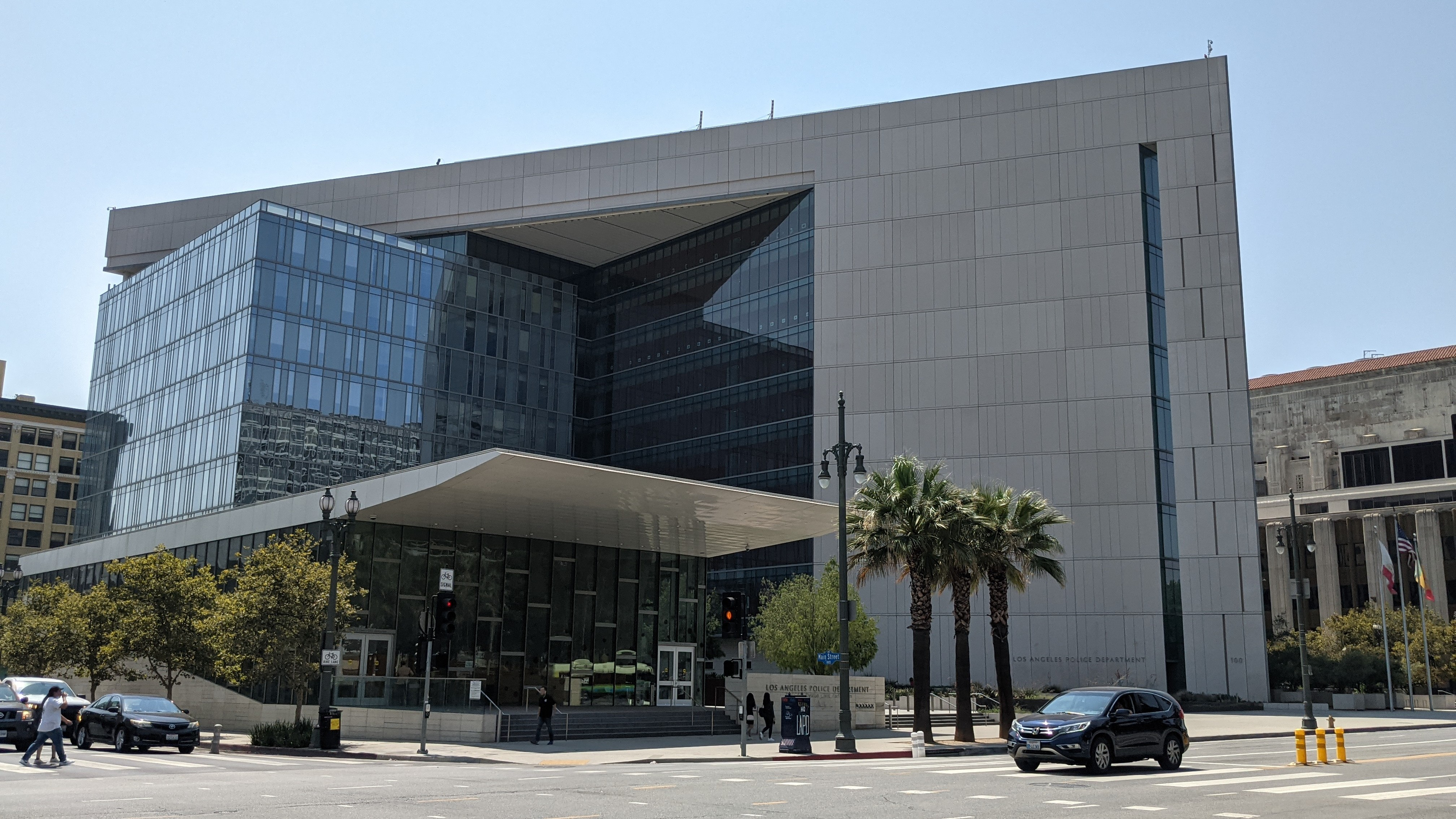
The Police Administration Building, the LAPD's headquarters since 2009

Before 2009, LAPD headquarters was located at Parker Center, named after former chief William H. Parker, which stood at 150 N. Los Angeles St. in the Downtown Los Angeles Civic Center district. It was demolished in 2019.

The Police Administration Building replaced Parker Center as LAPD headquarters in October 2009. It is located at 100 West 1st Street, also in the Civic Center, occupying the entire block between Main, Spring, 1st, and 2nd streets, immediately south of Los Angeles City Hall. Daniel, Mann, Johnson & Mendenhall were the architects. The total cost of the new building complex including the data center, the Main Street Parking Structure, and the Aiso Public Parking Garage was $437 million. The 10-story main building contains about 500,000 sq ft (46,000 m^{2}) of space, a café ("LA Reflections"), underground and structured parking, racks for 50 bicycles, and a 400-seat civic auditorium. It is LEED-certified, uses energy-efficient mechanical systems, daylighting, high-performance glass, and recycled or renewable building materials. The perimeter includes landscaped open space. The complex provides space for about 2,300 workers and allowed the department to bring together functions that had previously been spread among several locations. The opening of the new headquarters marked a symbolic shift for the department, replacing the former Parker Center, which had long been associated with controversial policing eras, including the tenure of Chief William H. Parker and the period surrounding the 1992 Los Angeles riots.

== Ranks ==
The LAPD uses a rank system that separates police officer, detective, supervisory, command, and executive positions. Police Officer I, II, and III are the main officer levels. Sergeants and lieutenants are supervisors, while captains, commanders, deputy chiefs, assistant chiefs, and the Chief of Police make up the higher command ranks. Detective I, II, and III are investigative classifications rather than a separate command chain. The department also uses pay-grade designations such as Police Officer III+1 for Senior Lead Officers and certain specialized assignments.

=== Senior ranks ===
Rank	Insignia	Notes
Chief of Police (highest)		The Chief is in charge of the entire Department. Appointment made by the mayor of Los Angeles, with majority approval of the Police Commission. Should have a college degree and at least 12 years of progressively responsible law enforcement experience. Jim McDonnell became the department's 59th chief in 2024. William H. Parker was the longest serving police chief in LAPD history, serving as chief for 16 years.
Assistant Chief of Police		Deputy Chiefs and Assistant Chiefs are in charge of specific police areas or support areas within the Department
Deputy Chief of Police		Deputy Chiefs and Assistant Chiefs are in charge of specific police areas or support areas within the Department
Commander		Eligibility for rank promotion achieved after completion of required probationary periods.
Captain I–III		Eligibility for rank promotion achieved after completion of required probationary periods.
Lieutenant I–II		Eligibility for rank promotion achieved after completion of required probationary periods.
Insignia are worn as metal pins on the collars of a shirt and as shoulder marks on a jacket.

=== Junior officer ranks ===
Rank	Insignia	Notes
Detective III		At least two years' service as Sergeant II or Detective III before eligibility for promotion to Lieutenant I.
Sergeant II		At least two years' service as Sergeant II or Detective III before eligibility for promotion to Lieutenant I.
Detective II		
Sergeant I		Field supervisor a.k.a. roaming supervisor in patrol division—supervises patrol officers division-wide. Other divisions have their own specific assignment and responsibilities for sergeant I.
Detective I		
Police Officer III+1		The rank of Police Officer III + 1, is a POIII, with a specific certification; e.g. K9, TO, Paramedicine, etc. this is so that the person can be paid more to match up with their certifications.
Police Officer III ^{‡}		At least four years' service as a Police Officer before becoming eligible for promotion to Sergeant I or Detective I (which requires an additional examination and interview).
Police Officer II	No insignia	At least three years' service as a Police Officer before eligibility for promotion to Police Officer III.
Police Officer I	No insignia	Automatic promotion to Police Officer II upon satisfactory completion of an 18-month probationary assignment (6 months at the academy plus a 12-month field assessment).
Insignia are worn as embroidered chevrons on the upper sleeves of a shirt or shoulder strap of a jacket.

== Demographics ==
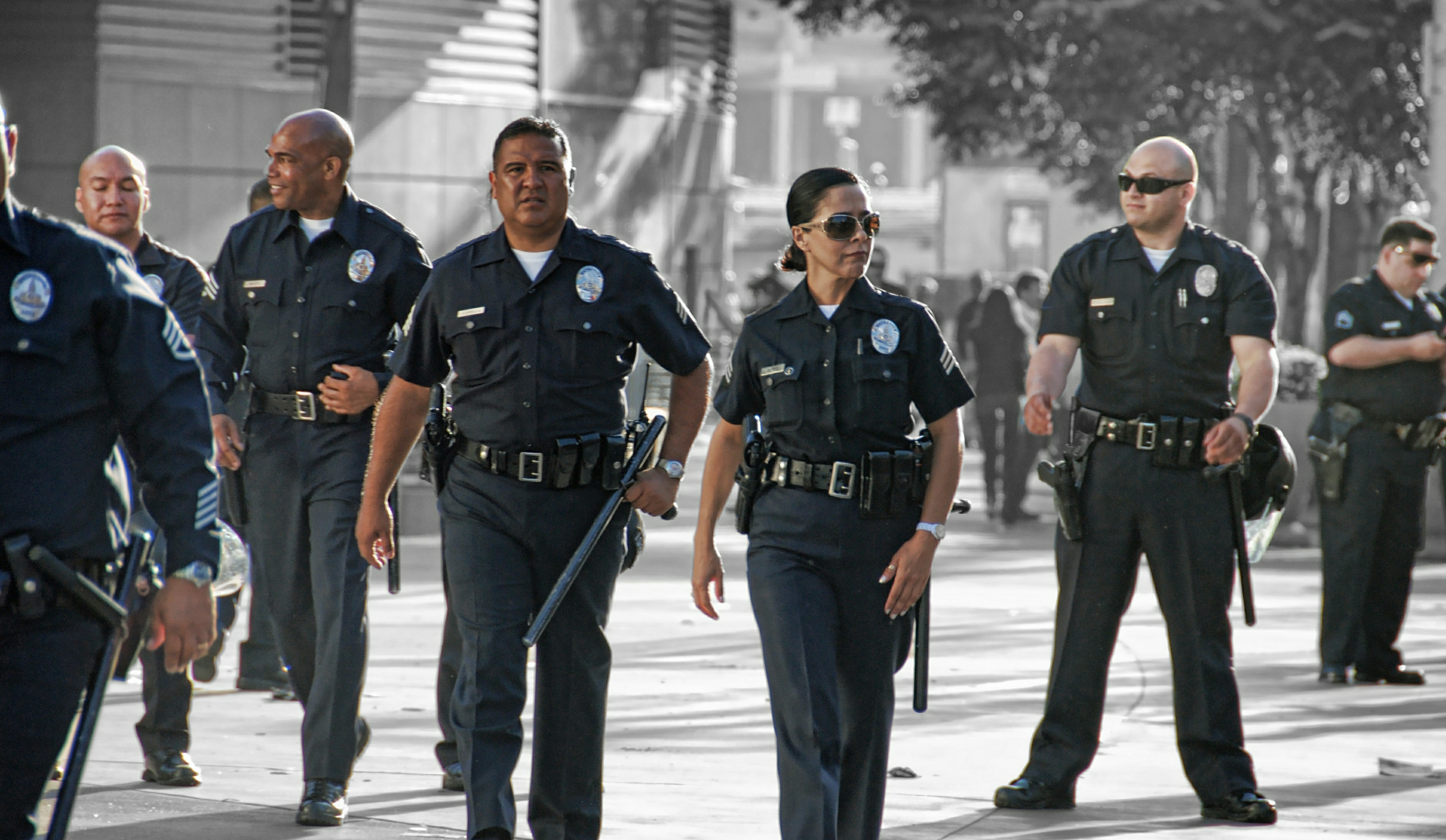
LAPD officers patrolling the then Staples Center during a Los Angeles Lakers game

Up to the Gates administration, the LAPD was predominantly white (80% in 1980), and many officers had resided outside the city limits. Simi Valley, the Ventura County suburb that later became infamous as the site of the state trial that immediately preceded the 1992 Los Angeles riots, has long been home to a large concentration of LAPD officers, most of them white. Hiring quotas began to change this during the 1980s, but it was not until the Christopher Commission reforms that substantial numbers of black, Hispanic, and Asian officers began to be hired onto the force. Minority officers can be found in both rank-and-file and leadership positions in virtually all divisions. In 1910 the LAPD hired the first female police officer with the power to arrest in the United States, Alice Stebbins Wells. LAPD's first Latina officer, Josephine Serrano Collier, was hired in 1946. On the LAPD through the early 1970s, women were classified as "policewomen". Through the 1950s, their duties generally consisted as working as matrons in the jail system or dealing with troubled youths working in detective assignments. Rarely did they work any field assignment, and they were not allowed to rise above the rank of sergeant. A lawsuit by a policewoman, Fanchon Blake, in the 1980s, instituted court-ordered mandates that the department begin actively hiring and promoting women police officers in its ranks. The department eliminated the rank of "policeman" from new hires at that time along with the rank of "policewoman". Anyone already in those positions was grandfathered in, but new hires were classified instead as "police officers", which continues to this day. In 2002, women made up 18.9% of the force. In 1886, the department hired its first two black officers, Robert William Stewart and Roy Green. In 1919, Georgia Ann Robinson became the LAPD's first Black policewoman and one of the earliest Black women to serve as a police officer in the United States. Despite this, the department was slow at integration. During the 1965 Watts riots, only 5 of the 205 police assigned to South Central Los Angeles were black, even though it was the largest black community in Los Angeles. Los Angeles' first black mayor, Tom Bradley was a former LAPD officer and quit the department after being unable to advance past the rank of lieutenant like other black police officers in the department. When Bradley was elected mayor in 1972, only 5% of LAPD officers were black and there was only one black captain in the department, Homer Broome. Broome would break down racial barriers on the force going on to become the first black officer to obtain the rank of commander and the first black station commander, leading the Southwest Division.

The most recent full demographic table cited here is from 2019. Since then, sworn staffing has fallen substantially; the city budgeted for about 8,555 sworn officers in 2026–27. The 2019 figures are therefore useful for the department's demographic makeup at that time, but not for its current total size.

As of 2019, the LAPD had 10,008 sworn officers. Of these, 81% (8,158) were male and 19% (1,850) female. The racial/ethnic breakdown:

- 48.78% or 4,882 were Hispanic/Latino (of any race)
- 30.88% or 3,090 were non-Hispanic White
- 9.61% or 962 were African American
- 7.65% or 766 were Asian
- 2.46% or 246 were Filipino American
- 0.62% or 62 were Native American and Other Ethnicities

The LAPD has grown over the years in the number of officers who speak languages in addition to English. There were 483 bilingual or multilingual officers in 1974, 1,560 in 1998, and 2,500 in 2001 who spoke at least one of 32 languages. In 2001, a study was released that found that non-English-speaking callers to the 911 and non-emergency response lines often receive no language translation, often receive incomplete information, and sometimes receive rude responses from police employees. The issue of a lack of multilingual officers led to reforms including bonuses and salary increases for officers who are certified in second languages. Currently, over a third of LAPD officers are certified in speaking one or more languages other than English. The department also uses a device called the phraselator to translate and broadcast thousands of prerecorded phrases in a multitude of languages, commonly used to broadcast messages in different languages from police vehicles.

== Work environment and compensation ==
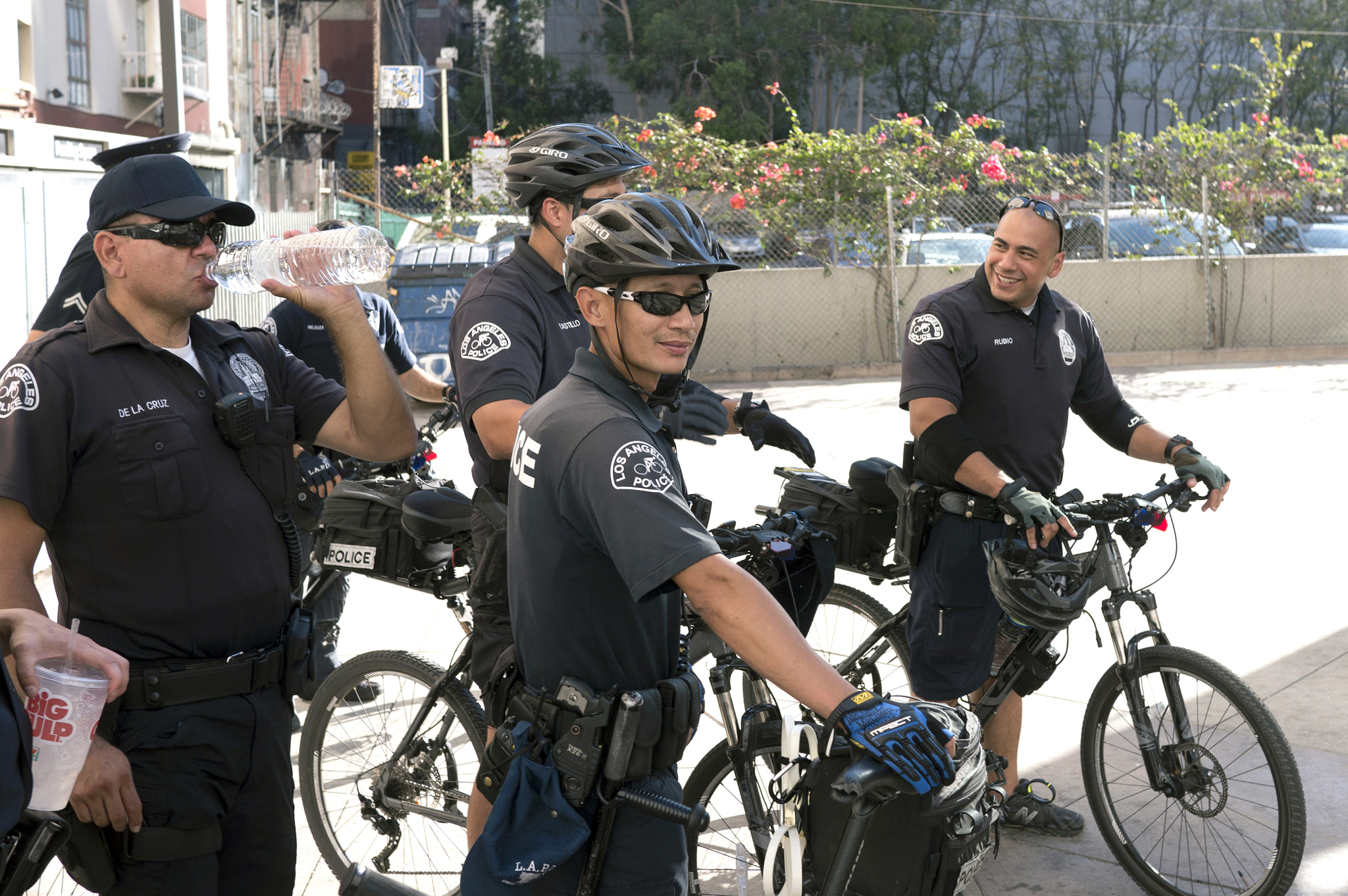
LAPD bicycle officers in 2014

LAPD officers can work compressed schedules, including three 12-hour shifts or four 10-hour shifts, depending on assignment. The department has over 250 types of job assignments, and each officer is eligible for such assignments after two years on patrol. LAPD patrol officers almost always work with a partner, unlike most suburban departments surrounding the City of Los Angeles, which deploy officers in one-officer units to maximize police presence and allow a smaller number of officers to patrol a larger area. The department's training division has three facilities throughout the city, including the Los Angeles Police Academy (Elysian Park), Ahmanson Recruit Training Center (Westchester), and the Edward Davis Training Center (Granada Hills). Current officer pay is much higher than the older salary figures below. A City of Los Angeles job bulletin revised July 31, 2026, listed the annual salary range for Police Officer I and II at $93,730 to $127,660, with a second starting range of $97,363 to $127,660 for some appointments.

The department has changed recruitment pay and bonuses several times. The following figures describe earlier programs and are kept for historical context.

From spring 2007 through the spring of 2009, recruits could earn money through sign-on bonuses ranging from $5,000 to $10,000. Those bonuses ended in 2009. Sign on bonuses were paid 1/2 after graduation from the academy, and 1/2 after completion of probation. $2,000 could be added for sign-ons from outside the Los Angeles area for housing arrangements. As of July 2009, recruits earned starting salaries of $56,522–61,095 depending on education level and began earning their full salary on their first day of academy training.

In January 2010, the starting base salary for incoming police officers was lowered by 20%. At the time If applicants had graduated from high school their starting salary would be $45,226, if they had at least 60 college units, with an overall GPA of 2.0 or better, their salary would start at $47,043, and if the applicant had fully completed a college degree, the salary would start at $48,880. In 2014, after negotiations between the city and the police officers union, an agreement on police officer pay that would give pay increases to nearly 1,000 officers who joined the department since the salaries for incoming officers were cut, was reached. The agreement also raised starting salaries for officers to $57,420 with an additional increase to $60,552 after six months which would become effective in the beginning of 2015. The agreement would also change the current overtime payment system from a deferred payment system, which was implemented to cut costs, to a pay-as-you-go overtime system as well as increase the overtime budget from $30 million to $70 million.

== Resources ==
=== Vehicles ===
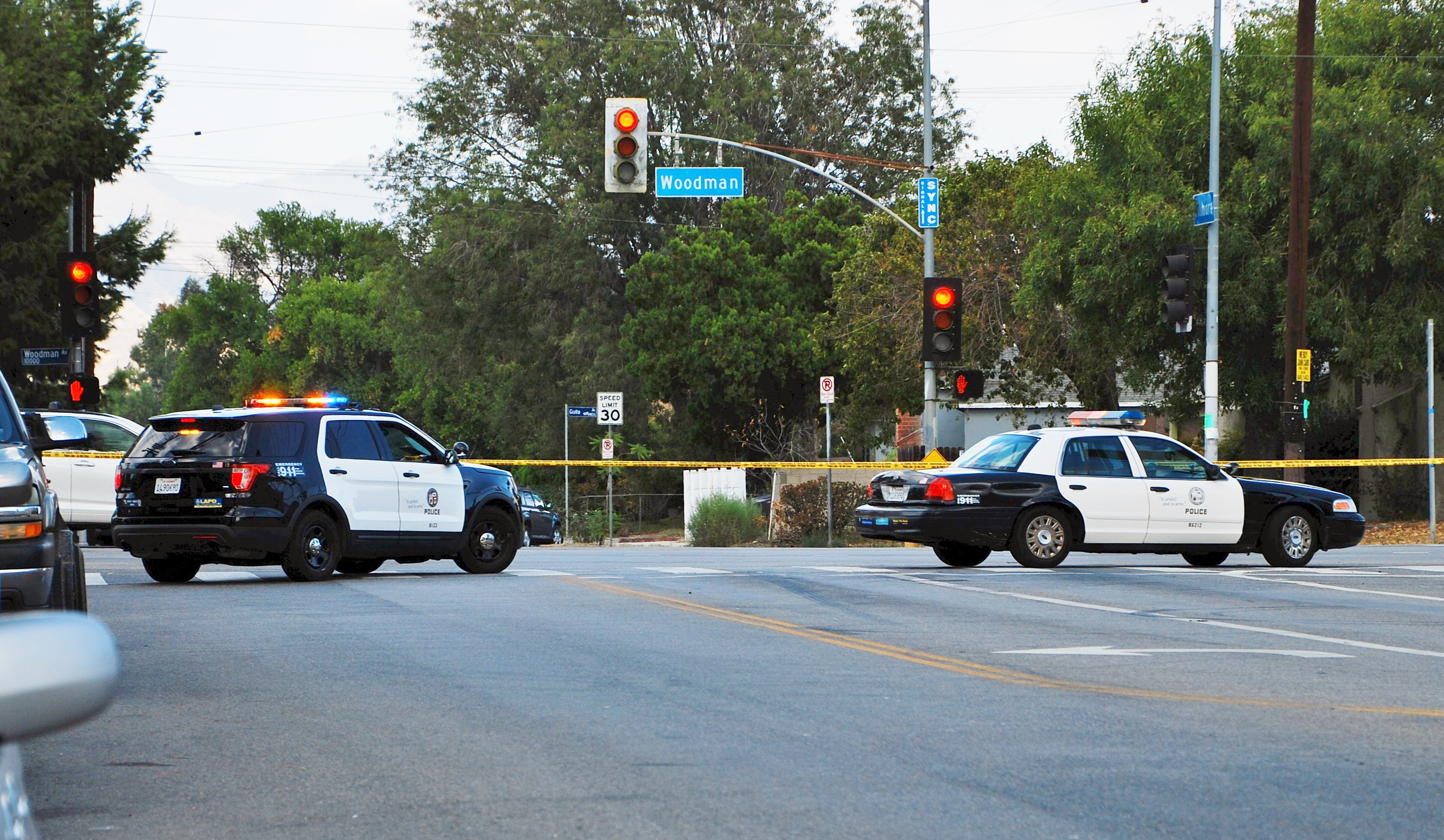
LAPD cruisers at the scene of a traffic collision

Motor Transport Division manages a fleet of more than 4,700 LAPD vehicles. The fleet includes marked and unmarked patrol vehicles, motorcycles, vans, trucks, buses, four-wheel-drive vehicles, armored rescue vehicles, bomb-disposal vehicles, mobile command posts, and vehicles for the dive, mounted, and canine units.

The department's patrol fleet has changed over time. Ford Police Interceptor Utility SUVs are now common in marked patrol service. Earlier fleets included large numbers of Ford Crown Victoria Police Interceptor sedans, Dodge Chargers, Ford Police Interceptor Sedans, Chevrolet Impalas, and other models. Crown Victorias and several other discontinued sedans that once dominated the fleet should be treated as historical vehicles rather than the department's current primary patrol cars.

The LAPD has one of the oldest and largest police motorcycle units in the world, celebrating its 100th anniversary in 2009 with 304 motor officers on its rolls at that time. The fleet currently consists primarily of BMW R1200RT-P and Harley-Davidson FLHP motorcycles.

The LAPD SWAT's primary vehicle is the Lenco BearCat. In the early 1980s, the LAPD obtained two Cadillac Gage Commandos from the U.S. Department of Energy, in preparation for security for the city's hosting of the 1984 Summer Olympics. They were used as battering rams to breach structures and buildings inhabited by hostile occupants. They saw action in the 1997 North Hollywood shootout but have since been retired.

=== Aviation ===
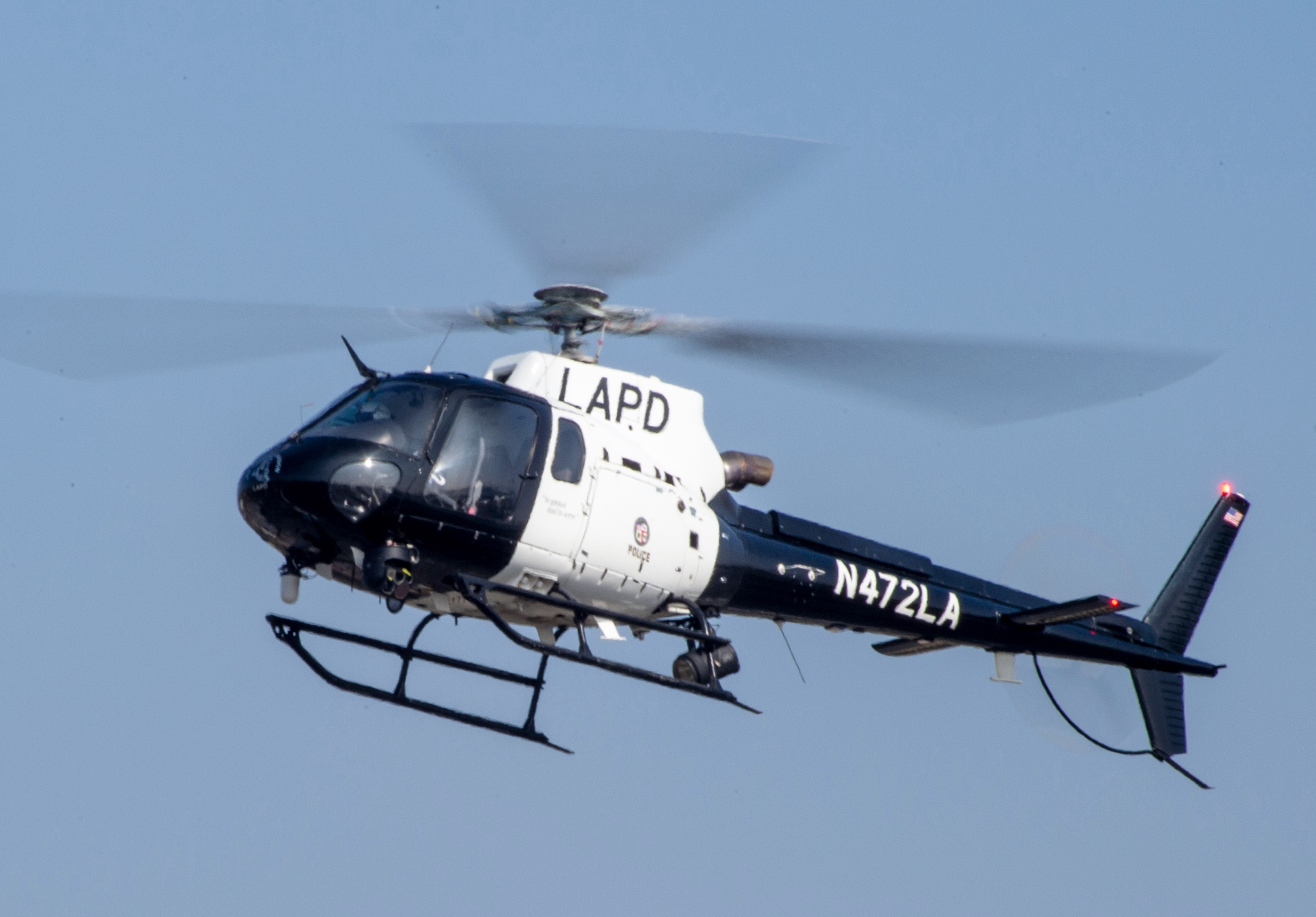
An LAPD Eurocopter AS350

The LAPD began its helicopter program in 1956 with a single Hiller 12J used mainly for traffic work. The unit expanded during the 1960s and became the Air Support Division in 1974.

At full capacity, the LAPD currently lists 16 A-Star helicopters, one Bell 412EP helicopter, and one King Air 200 fixed-wing aircraft. This is a major change from older inventories, including the 2007 federal survey that counted 19 helicopters. LAPD aircraft are operated by the LAPD Air Support Division. Most helicopter missions are flown from Hooper Heliport, near Union Station, and the department also uses facilities at Van Nuys Airport.

=== Body-worn cameras ===
The LAPD began preparing a body-worn-camera trial in 2013 and started field testing cameras with officers in the Skid Row area in January 2014. Reports from the trial program indicated that the cameras functioned well and that they assisted in deescalating situations although there were some technical issues with the cameras along with slight issues with the cameras falling off of officers during movement. In November 2014, the LAPD chose Axon Enterprise (formerly Taser International) as the vendor for body cameras to be used by officers after their trial program earlier in the year. On December 16, 2014, Mayor Eric Garcetti announced that the city would purchase 7,000 body worn cameras from Taser for use by the department. The pilot grew into a department-wide program. The LAPD now states that all field forces are equipped with body-worn video and all patrol units have digital in-car video. Officers are generally required to activate body-worn cameras before investigative or enforcement activity involving a member of the public, unless immediate activation would create a safety problem or is otherwise impractical under policy. 700 of the cameras were deployed to patrol officers in the Central, Mission and Newton patrol areas of the city beginning in January 2015. $1.55 million was raised from private donors to start the body camera program for the initial rollout phase in order to ease budget constraints for the city with another $1 million coming from the National Institute of Justice, a branch of the Department of Justice. Before all of the cameras were deployed to patrol officers, the Police Commission created a policy that governs the use of the cameras and video footage while consulting with department and city officials along with outside organizations including other departments who already use body cameras. The commission has created a policy that officers would have to turn on the cameras whenever they arrest or detain someone for interrogation and that many public interactions such as domestic violence interviews would not be recorded. Prior to the rollout of any body worn cameras, officers were able to carry personally owned audio recording devices since 1994 if they filed an application and obtained the requisite permission.

=== Drones ===
The LAPD received two small unmanned aircraft from the Seattle Police Department in 2014, but kept them grounded while the city debated rules for their use. The department later adopted limited drone use for tactical incidents. In July 2025, it began a Drone as First Responder pilot program. Under the program, drones can be sent to some emergency calls so an operator can give responding officers real-time information before they arrive. LAPD states that these drones are not used for routine aerial patrol and that flights are subject to privacy, recording, and Federal Aviation Administration rules.

=== Firearms ===
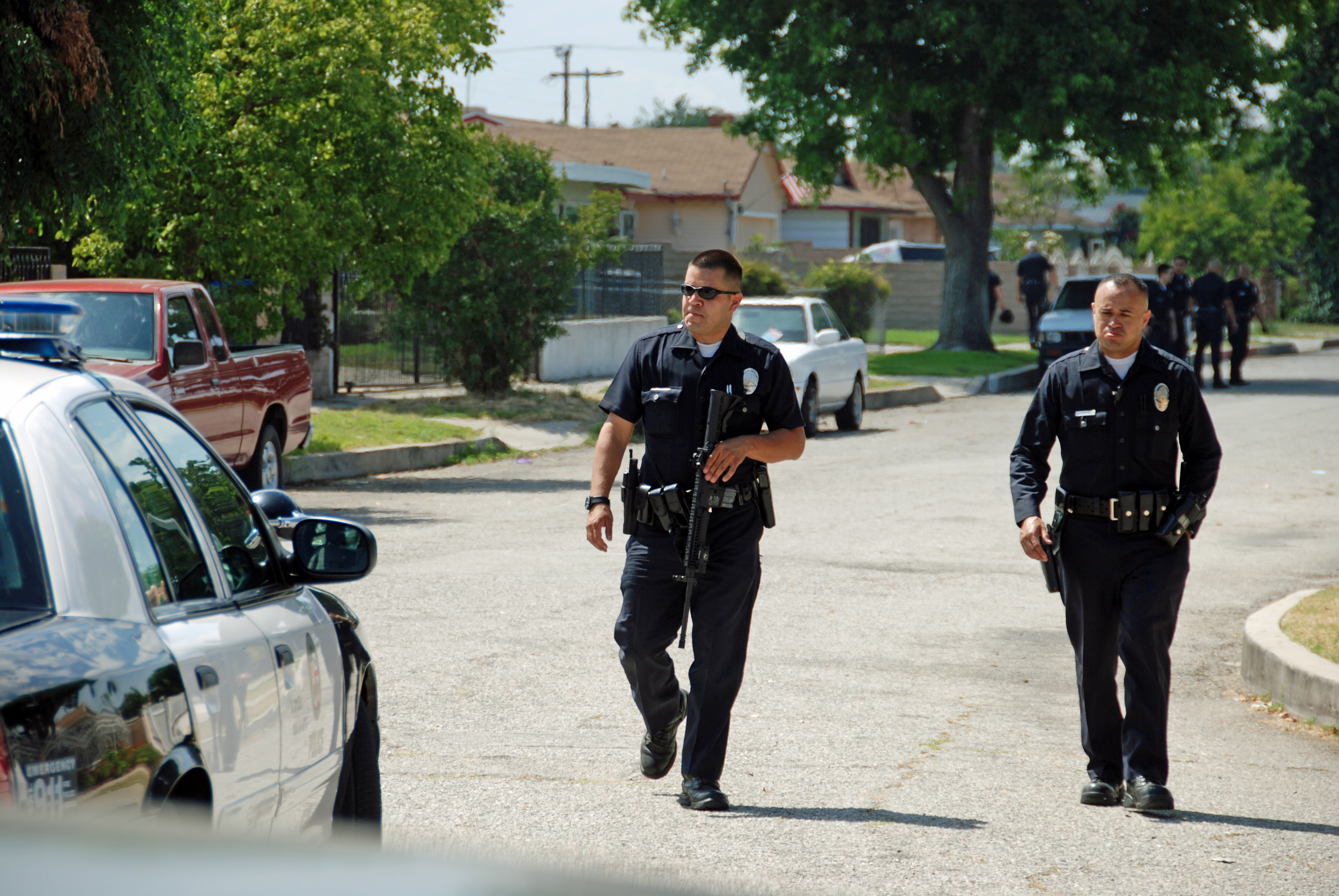
An LAPD officer armed with an AR-15 in 2011

The LAPD selected the FN 509 MRD-LE as the new duty pistol in 2021, and deliveries began in 2022. The FN 509 became a standard issue option for new officers, while several previously approved pistols remained authorized. Officers may also privately purchase and carry a variety of Glock, Kimber, Staccato, Smith & Wesson, or Beretta pistols. Officers are also issued the Remington 870 shotgun as the default long gun. Officers may also privately purchase the Benelli M4 shotgun, provided they complete a separate course instructing on the use of the Benelli shotgun. Officers qualified to use AR-15-style patrol rifles may also be issued or, under department rules, privately purchase approved rifles made by Heckler & Koch, Geissele, Smith & Wesson, Colt, or Bushmaster. LAPD possesses two M60 machine guns reserved for LAPD SWAT as a last resort or in case of "extraordinary circumstances"

The SWAT used the Kimber Custom TLE II as their sidearms in 2002, renaming it the Kimber LAPD SWAT Custom II. As of 2014, SWAT's primary weapons were the Heckler & Koch HK416, M4 carbine, and FN SCAR rifles; the Colt 9mm and HK MP5 submachine guns; the Armalite AR-10, Remington 700, Barrett M82, and M14 sniper rifles; and the Benelli M4 and Remington 870 shotguns. As of 2023, the LAPD adopted the Geissele Automatics Super Duty AR-15 style rifle for its SWAT and Tactical Surveillance Team.

Historically, the LAPD had no standard issue sidearms. After World War II, the LAPD began to issue the Smith & Wesson Model 10. During the 1960s and 1970s the department issued the S&W Model 15 Combat Masterpiece with a 6" barrel. Starting in 1969, these guns were issued with a 4" barrel and modified to fire double action only. These guns were issued with 158 grain round-nosed bullets, with 200 grain Lubaloy bullets authorized but not issued. Some specialized units (specifically Motor Officers) were issued the stainless-steel version, the Model 67. Starting in 1982, LAPD patrol officers were authorized to use Federal 125 grain plus-p hollow point ammunition. In 1989, the LAPD began to issue the Beretta 92F semiautomatic pistol chambered in 9mm to its officers. Later the Smith & Wesson Model 5906 was authorized as a substitute for the Beretta 92. Following the 1997 North Hollywood shootout, the LAPD obtained M16 rifles and officers were given the option of carrying the Smith & Wesson Model 4506 and 4566 service pistols chambered in 45 ACP. In 2002, Chief William Bratton, authorized officers to carry the Glock 22 chambered in .40 S&W, the firearm carried in the two previous departments Bratton led (the New York City Police Department and the Boston Police Department).

=== Specialist Weapons & Less Lethal Inventory and History ===
The LAPD began experimenting with electronic control devices around 1980, when early TF-series devices were assigned to specialized units. Early models were less reliable than later devices. The department adopted the M26 in 2001, the X26 in 2008, the X26P in 2014, and the TASER 7 in 2019. The department began testing the TASER 10 in 2023; the 2023 source cited in earlier versions of this article described a test, not department-wide issue to every officer. As of December 2025, LAPD training directives separately cover both the TASER 7 and TASER 10, showing that both systems are part of the department's current electronic-control-device framework.

The LAPD first approved the usage of less-lethal launchers by the Metropolitan Division in the immediate aftermath of the Rodney King Riots in 1992. It was authorized for usage by patrol officers the year after in November 1993. The LAPD utilizes launchers in older 37mm and the newer 40mm launchers. Initially, the LAPD adopted the Defense Technologies Model 1315 and Federal Model 203-A utilizing the 37mm Model 20 F baton rounds made by Defense Technologies. These older projectiles are designed to bounce off the ground and into their designated targets. These launchers have been kept in reserve with the adaptation of newer designs, though they still see use in cases of serious public disorder such as the 2020 George Floyd Protests and 2025 Anti ICE riots. In modern times, the LAPD generally uses the 40mm LMT model 1425 in combination with the Defense Technology eXact Impact Sponge Round. These newer launchers are painted in LAPD less-lethal green and equipped with an optical sight and forward foregrip to increase accuracy.

The LAPD also utilizes modified Remington 870 shotguns painted green for less-lethal use. Instead of a lethal round such as buckshot, a beanbag round is used which is designed to incapacitate a dangerous suspect whilst reducing the chance of fatal injury. These shotguns are widely made available to patrol officers alongside other less lethal tools.

The Metropolitan Division has access to a variety of specialist equipment and less-lethal tools and weaponry. Metro officers have access to Oleoresin Capsicum (OC) and 2‑chlorobenzylidene malononitrile (CS) gas for use against dangerous suspects and riot control. The gases are delivered in a variety of ways, such as through flameless grenades, liquid ferret rounds via 40mm launchers, or armored vehicle penetrators. Metropolitan Division also has access to a variety of flash grenades and stinger grenades as a tactical option during high risk operations.

=== Awards ===
The department presents several medals to its members for meritorious service. The LAPD awards medals for bravery, service, unit citations, ribbons for assignment and time-specific service, and marksmanship.

- Medal of Valor

The LAPD Medal of Valor is the highest law enforcement medal awarded to officers by the Los Angeles Police Department. The Medal of Valor is an award for bravery, usually awarded to officers for individual acts of extraordinary heroism performed in the line of duty at extreme and life-threatening personal risk.

== Public opinion ==
In a 2020 survey of Los Angeles residents, two-thirds said they believe the department is doing a good job maintaining public safety, while 88% supported community policing, 82% supported an unarmed response model, and 62% supported redirecting some money from the department to community initiatives. There were differences of opinion along racial lines, with three in five white and Asian residents and one in three black residents trusting the LAPD to "do what is right".

Loyola Marymount University has continued the Police and Community Relations Survey as a multi-year study. Its 2023 survey included 1,751 adults in the city, with at least 400 respondents in each of the four LAPD geographic bureaus and a reported margin of error of ±3%. Because questions and public opinion change over time, older percentages in this section should be read as snapshots of the years in which the surveys were conducted.

== Controversies ==
Over the years, the Los Angeles Police Department has been the subject of several scandals, misconduct, and other controversies. According to one study, during the lengthy tenure of William H. Parker as police chief (1950–1966), the LAPD was "outwardly racist", and the tenure of police chief Daryl Gates (1978–1992) was marked by "scandalous racist violence" among the LAPD. Following the Rampart Division CRASH scandal of the late 1990s and early 2000s, the United States Department of Justice entered into a consent decree with the LAPD regarding systemic civil rights violations and lack of accountability that stretched back decades, requiring major reforms. The consent decree was lifted in 2013. The executive director of the American Civil Liberties Union (ACLU) of Southern California stated that the decree "accomplished its purpose by and large" and that the department "has made serious culture changes", but cautioned against backsliding and said there was more work to be done regarding racial disparities and treatment of the homeless.

=== 1920s–1940s ===
Louis D. Oaks, chief of the LAPD in the early 1920s, was a member of the Ku Klux Klan. James E. Davis served two terms as LAPD police chief, heading the department from 1926 to 1929 and from 1933 to 1938. During his first term as chief, Davis called for violence against criminals while leading a Prohibition vice squad, and the department was known for controversies including accusations of conspiracy, blackmail, and murder. Davis also formed a Red Squad to combat labor unions; headed by Capt. William F. Hynes, the squad arrested hundreds of strike participants. In March 1928, Christine Collins reported her nine-year-old son, Walter, missing. Five months later, a boy named Arthur Hutchins came forth claiming to be Walter; when Mrs. Collins told the police that the boy was not her son, she was committed to a mental institution under a Section 12 internment. It was later determined that Walter had fallen victim to a child rapist/murderer in the infamous Wineville Chicken Coop murders, and Arthur Hutchins admitted that he had lied about his identity to meet his favorite actor, Tom Mix. The widely publicized case was depicted in the 2008 film Changeling.

When Frank L. Shaw was elected mayor in 1933, he reappointed Davis as police chief, and the LAPD––already considered "nationally notorious" for police corruption––entered a new phase of widespread criminal activity. In 1936, Davis sent members of the LAPD to California's state borders, along Arizona, Nevada, and Oregon, to institute checkpoints blocking the entry of migrants, or "okies". The police began raids and mass arrests of populations including the homeless and disabled; those taken in by police were given the option of leaving California or serving a 180-day jail term. The so-called "bum blockade" ended after significant negative publicity, including a suit filed by the ACLU in federal court.

By 1937, the LAPD was leading a vast intelligence operation wiretapping politicians, judges, and federal agents. Some records of police surveillance were taken under subpoena after Harry Raymond, a former officer investigating corruption in the force, was the victim of a car bomb. During the trial that followed, LAPD captain Earl Kynette was found guilty of Raymond's attempted murder; Davis acknowledged that he had known Raymond was under police surveillance. In the late 1930s, the LAPD engaged in widespread racial profiling of Mexican Americans. The LAPD and the Los Angeles County Sheriff's Department used the 1942 "Sleepy Lagoon murder" of José Gallardo Díaz to justify a coordinated crackdown: the police identified primarily-Mexican American communities, cordoned them off with blockades, and carried out mass searches and arrests. The police detained hundreds of Mexican Americans before indicting 22 for murder. Twelve of the defendants were charged with murder and incarcerated; all convictions were later overturned. Members of the LAPD were accused of participating in anti-Mexican American violence during the Zoot Suit Riots that followed in 1943; despite the LAPD's insistence that the riots were caused by Mexican American crime, there was broad consensus that the riots were the result of racial discrimination.

=== 1950s–1960s ===
William H. Parker, who served as chief of the LAPD from August 9, 1950, until his death on July 16, 1966, was frequently criticized for racist remarks, his refusal to acknowledge police brutality, and his demands that the police not be subject to the same laws as citizens; the last of these contributed to ongoing conflicts with the FBI, with the agency refusing to train LAPD officers until after Parker's death. Parker adopted the rhetoric of Los Angeles as the "white spot" of America, first popularized by Los Angeles Times publisher Harry Chandler, and explicitly set it against the "black picture" of the nation. The Los Angeles City Council once confronted him with a recording in which he referred to Mexican Americans as not being far from "the wild tribes of Mexico"; in the 1960s, he claimed that "by 1970, 45% of the metropolitan area of Los Angeles will be Negro" and that the city should support a strong police force because "if you don't, come 1970, God help you"; he described Black participants in the 1965 Watts riots as acting like "monkeys in a zoo". The Los Angeles Police Department was not integrated until the 1960s.

Early in his tenure as police chief, Parker launched an extensive public relations campaign for the LAPD. In the 1950s, he was a credited consultant for police procedural drama Dragnet, even offering the show departmental support in providing case examples and fact-checking; he popularized the term "thin blue line" in both his speeches and in a TV show he conceived and produced for Los Angeles NBC network KNBC; he hired Star Trek creator Gene Roddenberry as a speech writer; and he introduced the department's first press office. These efforts were seen as tied to his efforts to curry public favor and extend the reach of officers of the LAPD.

Bloody Christmas was the name given to the severe beating of seven civilians under LAPD custody on December 25, 1951. The attacks, which left five Hispanic and two white young men with broken bones and ruptured organs, were only properly investigated after lobbying from the Mexican American community. The internal inquiry by Chief Parker resulted in eight police officers being indicted for the assaults, 54 being transferred, and 39 suspended. In 1962, the controversial LAPD shooting of seven unarmed members of the Nation of Islam resulted in the death of Ronald Stokes, and led to protests of the LAPD led by Malcolm X and the Nation of Islam.

=== 1970s–1980s ===
In the 1970s and into the 1980s "biased policing", also known as racial profiling, was commonplace in the department. This policing alienated the department from minority residents and gained the department a reputation of abuse of power and bias against minority residents. A major controversy erupted in 1979 over the shooting of Eula Love by two LAPD officers; no legal consequences befell the officers responsible.

Early in his tenure as Chief of Police, Daryl Gates re-instituted the use of the chokehold (placing an arm or flashlight over someone's throat) to subdue suspects. In 1982, this technique was used and led to the death of James Mincey Jr. Following Mincey's death, the Police Commission barred the use of chokeholds by officers unless in a life-threatening situation. An investigation found that sixteen people had died after being restrained by police chokeholds. In 1986, Officer Stephanie Lazarus killed her ex-boyfriend's new wife. Despite the victim's father's insistence that Lazarus should be a suspect in the homicide, she was not considered by the police and the case went cold. In the 2000s, detectives revisiting cold cases deduced that Stephanie was a suspect. DNA evidence led to her arrest and conviction.

Also in 1986, the department purchased a 14-ton armored breaching vehicle, used to smash quickly through the walls of houses of suspects. The ACLU questioned the constitutionality of the vehicle, and the California Supreme Court later held that the warrantless use of the battering ram in the case violated search-and-seizure protections. In 1988, African American baseball sportscaster and retired Baseball Hall of Fame player Joe Morgan was detained at Los Angeles International Airport by LAPD and L.A. Airport Police officers after being falsely identified as a drug dealer. He was released when the LAPD realized their mistake. The city cleared the detective of wrongdoing, but Morgan subsequently filed a civil suit against both the LAPD and the city for the unlawful detention; the lawsuit was settled in 1993, and Morgan was awarded $800,000 by the Los Angeles City Council.

On August 1, 1988, as part of Chief Gates' Operation Hammer directed against gangs, SWAT teams raided four apartments at 39th Street and Dalton Avenue. According to an investigation by the department's Internal Affairs, the team leader, Captain Thomas Elfmont, directed his men to "hit" the apartments "hard", to "level" them, and to leave them "uninhabitable". The police detained 37 people, making seven arrests. They found six ounces of marijuana and a small amount of cocaine. The seven were beaten by the police and at the police station forced to whistle the theme to The Andy Griffith Show. Those who refused to comply were beaten again. Nobody was charged with a crime. The city paid four million dollars to settle the matter.

On September 4, 1988, LAPD officers raided the home of Roger Guydon looking for drugs. They found nothing. In 1991, Guydon won a $760,000 lawsuit against the city.

=== 1990s–2000s: Rodney King, LA riots, consent decree ===
In April 1991, the Christopher Commission was formed in the wake of the Rodney King beating, by the then-mayor of Los Angeles Tom Bradley. It was chaired by attorney Warren Christopher and was created to examine the structure and operation of the LAPD. The commission found that there were a significant number of LAPD officers who used excessive force and that the disciplinary structure was weak and ineffective. Fewer than a third of the suggested reforms were put into place.

To reduce drive-by shootings, LAPD initiated Operation Cul-de-Sac in 1991. This consisted of installing barriers on residential streets to block vehicle traffic. As a result, homicides and assaults were greatly reduced. The program ended after two years, with violent crime rates returning to their previous levels.

On July 1, 1992, John Daniels Jr., 36, a tow truck driver, was fatally shot by LAPD Officer Douglas Iversen as he was driving away from a service station in South Central. Iversen was charged with second-degree murder, the first officer to ever be charged with murder for an on-duty shooting. Two separate juries were deadlocked on the charge with 20 out of 24 voting for acquittal of all charges. The case was dismissed by a judge. Daniels' family received a $1.2 million settlement after filing a lawsuit against the City of Los Angeles.

The Los Angeles riots of 1992, also known as the Rodney King uprising or the Rodney King riots, began on April 29, 1992, when a jury acquitted four LAPD police officers accused in the videotaped beating of Rodney King following a high-speed car pursuit on March 3, 1991. After seven days of jury deliberations, the jury acquitted all four officers of assault and acquitted three of the four of using excessive force. The evening after the verdict, thousands of people in the Los Angeles area rioted for over six days following the verdict. Widespread looting, assault, arson, and murder occurred, and property damages totaled one billion dollars. In all, 53 people died during the riots.

On October 12, 1996, LAPD Officers Rafael Pérez and Nino Durden entered the apartment of Javier Ovando. They shot Ovando in the back, paralyzing him from the waist down. They then planted a gun on the unarmed Ovando to make it appear he had attacked them. The two officers then perjured themselves. Ovando was sentenced to 23 years in custody based on their testimony. Later, one of the officers admitted his crime. Ovando was released, and in 2000, was paid $15 million for his injuries and imprisonment. The officers' actions led to the exposure of the Rampart scandal. By 2001, the resulting investigations would lead to more than 75 officers being investigated or charged, and over 100 criminal cases being overturned, due to perjury or other forms of misconduct, much based on the plea-bargain testimony of Perez.

Following the Rampart scandal, the United States Department of Justice entered into a consent decree with the LAPD regarding systemic civil rights violations and lack of accountability that stretched back decades. Many in the LAPD resisted federal oversight and proposed reforms but entered into a consent decree when the DOJ threatened to sue the city and take complete control over the LAPD. Mayor Richard J. Riordan and the Los Angeles city council agreed to the terms of the decree on November 2, 2000. The federal judge formally entered the decree into law on June 15, 2001. To promote civil rights integrity, the legally binding decree emphasized several areas, including management and supervisory measures, revising critical incident procedures, documentation, investigation and review, revising the management of gang units, revising the management of confidential informants, program development for response to persons with mental illness, improving training, increased integrity audits, increasing the operations of the Police Commission and the Inspector General, and increasing community outreach and public information.

Other provisions in the decree called for divisions to investigate all use of force (now known as Force Investigative Division) and conduct audits department-wide; the development of a risk management system; the creation of a field data capture system to track the race, ethnicity or national origin of the motorists and pedestrians stopped by the department; the creation of an Ethics Enforcement Section within the Internal Affairs Group; the transfer of investigative authority to Internal Affairs of all serious personnel complaint investigations; a nationwide study by an independent consultant on law enforcement dealing with the mentally ill, to help the department refine its system; a study by an independent consultant of the department's training programs; and the creation of an informant manual and database.

The Consent Decree Bureau was the LAPD bureau charged with overseeing this process. Until 2009, the commanding officer of the Consent Decree Bureau, a civilian appointed by the chief of police, was Police Administrator Gerald L. Chaleff. In 2006, the consent decree was extended by six years, as U.S. District Court Judge Gary Feess found that the LAPD had not implemented the reforms that it had committed to. The federal oversight of the LAPD was lifted in 2013. On July 10, 2005, while under the influence of alcohol and cocaine, Jose Pena took his 19-month-old daughter, Suzie, hostage in his home. After police arrived, Pena threatened to kill her and himself after firing at others earlier. SWAT officers were called in. After negotiations to try and release Pena's daughter were unsuccessful, four SWAT officers entered the home and, during a gunfight, both Mr. Pena and his infant daughter were shot and killed by SWAT team members. One officer was shot and wounded by Pena. Suzie Pena's death was the first death of a hostage ever in LAPD SWAT history and the LAPD was criticized for their actions. An independent board of inquiry later cleared the SWAT officers of any wrongdoing. A judge later dismissed a lawsuit by the mother of Suzie Pena because the officers acted reasonably in the case and no negligence was involved.

In 2003, the LAPD arrested Juan Catalan after a 16-year-old girl was shot dead. Catalan was sentenced to death after a witness stated that he looked like the killer. Catalan turned out to be innocent; it was footage shot for the sitcom Curb Your Enthusiasm which showed him at Dodger Stadium, showing him watching a baseball game with his family, that exonerated him.

On May Day, 2007, immigrant rights groups held rallies in MacArthur Park in support of undocumented immigrants. The rallies were permitted and initially the protesters followed the terms of the permits, but some of the protesters began blocking the street. After warnings by the LAPD, the protesters failed to disperse and the rally was declared an unlawful assembly. The LAPD only announced the declaration of the unlawful assembly in English leading to confusion by some in the crowd who only spoke Spanish. Police officers held a line to prevent protesters from entering the street and did not disperse the crowd until rocks, bottles, and other objects began to be thrown at the police. The officers began slowly advancing and fired rubber bullets and used batons to disperse crowd members who refused to comply with police orders to leave the area. Police were heavily criticized for firing rubber bullets at some journalists and hitting some with batons who did not disperse along with the crowds. Seventeen officers and two sergeants of the metropolitan division were recommended for punishment by a department internal review for their actions in the incident.

In 2008, Officer Russell Mecano offered to not arrest a woman in exchange for sex and offered cash to another woman in exchange for sex. He was convicted and sentenced to more than eight years.

=== 2010s–2020s ===
On July 22, 2012, Alesia Thomas, an African American woman, died in the back of a police car after being kicked in the upper thigh, groin, and abdomen. Her cause of death was ruled "undetermined", and the autopsy report mentioned cocaine intoxication as a "major" contributing factor, but also indicated that the struggle with officers "could not be excluded" as a contributing factor to her death. It was later revealed that Thomas was also determined to have bipolar disorder. Later, LAPD officer Mary O'Callaghan was charged with assault over her actions in the case. As a result of these events, on September 1, 2012, civil rights activists requested an emergency meeting with LAPD Chief Charlie Beck to review arrest and use-of-force policies.

On August 18, 2012, Ronald Weekley Jr., a college student, was punched in the face while being arrested after being stopped for riding his skateboard on the wrong side of the street. On August 21, 2012, Michelle Jordan, a registered nurse, was pulled over for holding her cell phone while driving. She was thrown to the ground twice in the course of being arrested after getting out of the car and refusing to comply with an officer's command to get back in the vehicle.

On February 7, 2013, the LAPD was involved in what Chief Beck called "a case of mistaken identity" when, during the manhunt for the murderer and fired LAPD officer Christopher Dorner, the LAPD and the Torrance Police Department fired upon pickup trucks at two separate locations, believing them to be Dorner. The first incident took place on the 19500 Block of Redbeam Avenue. LAPD officers fired numerous shots into the back of a blue pickup truck, allegedly without warning, and injured the two women inside. Twenty-five minutes later, the Torrance Police shot into the windshield of another pickup truck, narrowly missing the driver. In both cases the victims were not involved with the Dorner case. The Dorner case involved allegations of impropriety by other LAPD officers, as Dorner alleged that he had been fired for reporting brutality by his training officer. The manhunt was triggered by Dorner's alleged attacks against LAPD and ex-LAPD personnel. In 2013, the city of Los Angeles agreed to pay the two female victims of the first incident $2.1 million each to settle the matter. The city of Torrance agreed to pay the victim of the second incident $1.8 million.

In May 2014, after much controversy in their city, the Seattle Police Department transferred two Draganflyer X6 UAVs to the LAPD. The LAPD stated that the only uses for the drones would be for narrow and prescribed circumstances such as hostage situations, but that they would not be put into use until the Board of Police Commissioners and the City Attorney crafted a policy for their use after the LA City Council ordered the policy creation. The decision to use the drones gained significant opposition from community activists including the ACLU and new groups founded after the announcement about drone use including Stop LAPD Spying Coalition and the Drone-Free LAPD, No Drones, LA! Activist groups protested outside of city hall against the use of drones by the LAPD.

On August 11, 2014, an African-American man named Ezell Ford was shot by two LAPD gang detectives after they made an investigative stop of Ford on the street. Ford was unarmed and the officers claimed that he got into a physical struggle with one of them and then reached for their gun, forcing them to fire on Ford, while some witnesses who claimed to have seen the incident alleged that there was no struggle. The autopsy report was ordered to be released by Mayor Eric Garcetti before the end of 2014.

On September 11, 2014, African-American actress Danièle Watts was temporarily detained by the LAPD when she and her boyfriend were in Studio City. Watts accused the officers who stopped her of racially profiling her because she was African-American and her boyfriend was Caucasian, claiming that they treated her as if she was a "prostitute" and that the officers had been disrespectful to her because she was African-American. LAPD Sergeant Jim Parker who was one of the two officers accused by Watts of misconduct, released a personal audio recording of the entire incident to TMZ. The recording showed that police had received a 911 call about lewd acts in a car and the couple who were described to have committed the lewd acts fit Watts' and her boyfriend's description. It also showed that when officers arrived on the scene, Watts' boyfriend cooperated with police but Watts refused to cooperate and identify herself, accused the officers of racism, and ignored officers requests and walked away from them leading to her being handcuffed and temporarily detained. Following the release of the recording, local civil rights activists called for Watts to apologize to the LAPD for falsely accusing them of racial profiling but Watts refused. The two officers were cleared of any wrongdoing by the department shortly after the release of the audio recordings.

In October 2014, the LAPD Office of the Inspector General released a report that members of the department had been using department computers to falsely inflate the number of officers and patrol cars that were on duty at any given time in a method known as "ghost cars". The report found that supervisors of various ranks would check officers into vacant assignments right before the department's computerized patrol software did its headcount and then log the officers off when the count was done. The report found that the practice occurred in at least five out of 21 patrol divisions, and the report also highlighted the causes including understaffing in the LAPD.

In 2018, LAPD officers Louis Lozano and Eric Mitchell were fired for misconduct, making false statements, and violating the public's trust in their actions during an armed robbery in 2017. On April 15, 2017, Lozano and Mitchell were on duty when they received a call for an armed robbery at a nearby Macy's. Despite being close to the scene, the officers remained parked in an alleyway; Sergeant Jose Gomez, patrol sergeant for that shift, asked that the officers respond to the robbery, but they did not reply. While being questioned over the incident, Lozano and Mitchell claimed they could not hear the call due to loud music from a nearby park. When Sergeant Gomez reviewed their vehicle recordings, he found the officers were distracted by the mobile game Pokémon Go, and that they ignored the robbery call and left their patrol jurisdiction to continue playing the game. Lozano and Mitchell attempted to appeal their firing, arguing their vehicle recordings were used improperly as evidence, but the California Second District Court of Appeal rejected their appeal.

In June 2020, following a campaign by a coalition of community groups including Black Lives Matter, Los Angeles Mayor Eric Garcetti announced LAPD budget cuts of $150 million. Garcetti announced the funds would be redirected to community initiatives. Then-Senator Kamala Harris supported Garcetti's decision to cut the LAPD's budget.

In 2020, the Los Angeles County District Attorney's Office announced that six LAPD officers had been charged with conspiracy and falsifying information in a false gang labeling scandal, with an additional 18 officers under investigation. The discovery of false accusations led to the review of hundreds of cases and the dismissal of several felony charges dating back to 2016.

On February 13, 2021, the LAPD announced in a series of tweets it was launching an internal investigation into the Harbor Division after their employees allegedly passed around a Valentine's Day-themed e-card depicting George Floyd with the caption "You take my breath away", which referred to Floyd's murder. The LAPD said it "will have zero tolerance for this type of behavior".

On June 30, 2021, an LAPD bomb disposal squad detonated confiscated illegal fireworks in a residential neighborhood, injuring 17 people, causing extensive damage to nearby houses, and destroying the LAPD's bomb disposal truck. The explosion reportedly occurred when the bomb squad significantly underestimated the weight of the fireworks that were loaded into the truck's blast chamber. 42 pounds of fireworks were loaded into the blast chamber; however, it was only designed to sustain 15 pounds of explosives, with a maximum of 25 pounds (though this would disable the truck). The LAPD was criticized for carelessly handling explosives and detonating them in a neighborhood; Chief Moore publicly apologized during a news conference, informing reporters the bomb squad had begun implementing new procedures to prevent similar incidents in the future.

In September 2021, The Guardian reported that LAPD officers had been instructed by Chief Michel Moore to collect social media account information from all citizens they interview, whether or not they have been accused of committing a crime. Further, officers were asked to collect Social Security numbers and instructed to tell individuals that they "must be provided" under federal law, although it is unclear if this is true. In a response to the comment, the LAPD stated that the field interview policy was "being updated". An updated policy instructs officers not to collect Social Security numbers.

Beginning in 2025, the LAPD stopped regularly releasing the detailed crime data that had supported public crime maps for about two decades. In response to a public-records request, the department argued that releasing preliminary data could lead to "misguided public policy discussions or unjustified public panic". A First Amendment attorney interviewed by LAist disputed that reasoning under the California Public Records Act. By March 2026, several organizations were still seeking the data and a crime-mapping company had sued the department. LAPD said it was repairing, reviewing, and preparing the data for possible release and denied wrongdoing in the lawsuit.

On June 13, 2026, an LAPD officer shot and killed a dog after responding to a 911 call reporting a "domestic disturbance" in the Canoga Park neighborhood; the woman had been screaming because of a basketball game. The incident prompted criticism of the department and of use-of-force protocols. Body Camera footage of the incident was released on June 20.

In August 2026, the LAPD released video showing officers using force on handcuffed detainee Jose Carlos Hoyos-Munoz at a Van Nuys jail before his death in July. The death remained under investigation, and the medical examiner had not yet announced a final cause and manner of death. Mayor Karen Bass called for an independent review of deaths involving people in police custody and people experiencing mental-health crises.

== Fallen officers ==
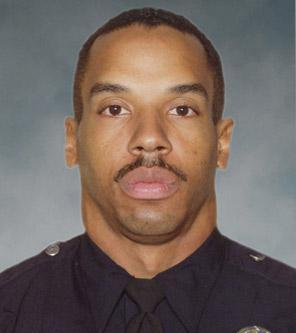
Randal Simmons, the first LAPD SWAT officer to be killed in the line of duty, on February 7, 2008

At its May 2026 memorial ceremony, the LAPD honored 241 officers who had died in the line of duty. Los Angeles City Marshal William Warren, a precursor to the current structure of the LAPD, was shot by one of his own deputies in 1870. Officer Charles Keary is reported as the first officer lost on July 1, 1886. Officer Walter Krep was the first motorcycle officer lost on March 28, 1916. In 2008, Randal Simmons became the first LAPD SWAT officer to be killed in the line of duty.

There have been two memorials to fallen LAPD officers. One was outside Parker Center, the former headquarters, which was unveiled on October 1, 1971. The monument was a fountain made from black granite, its base inscribed with the names of deceased LAPD officers.

The old monument located at Parker Center was destroyed in the process of being transported but was replaced by a new memorial at the Police Administration Building, the Los Angeles Police Department Memorial for Fallen Officers, dedicated on October 14, 2009. The memorial is made up of more than 2,000 brass alloy plaques, 207 of which are inscribed with the names of fallen police officers. Two deaths are unsolved, both of off-duty officers: Fred Early, shot in 1972, and Michael Lee Edwards, shot in May 1974. In addition to the numbers listed above, eight police officers and two other LAPD employees died due to COVID-19 complications.

== In popular culture ==
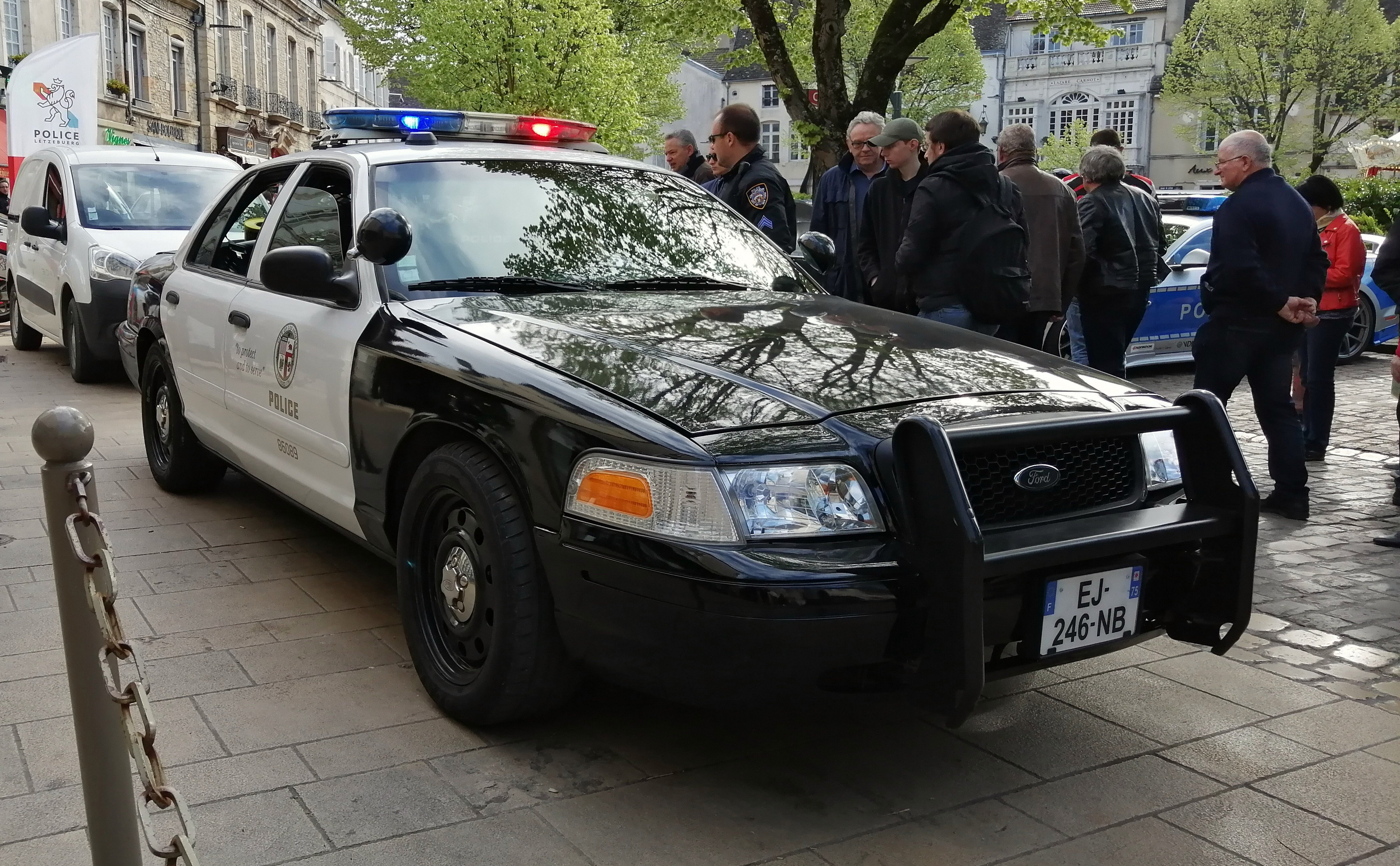
A Ford Crown Victoria in a mock LAPD configuration in Beaune, France, exemplifying the widespread recognizability of the LAPD

Los Angeles' central role in the American film and television industries has made the LAPD one of the most frequently depicted police departments in popular culture. Some productions have worked directly with the department, while others have used fictionalized versions of the LAPD or portrayed it critically. The lists below give notable examples rather than every production in which the department appears.

=== LAPD-sanctioned media entities ===
One of the earliest notable representations of the LAPD in media was the 1930s CBS radio drama Calling All Cars, which hired LAPD radio dispatcher Jesse Rosenquist to voice the series' dispatcher. Rosenquist was already famous because home radios could tune in to early police radio frequencies; as the first police radio dispatcher presented to the public ear, he was the voice that actors went to when called upon for a radio dispatcher role. Chief James E. Davis also presented the show, and many of its plotlines were based on actual incidents the LAPD had handled, a concept that would be a staple of most future LAPD-sanctioned works.

From April to September 1952, KNBH aired The Thin Blue Line, a panel show hosted by LAPD Chief William H. Parker, who discussed police affairs with a panel of experts and the audience. Jack Webb produced the Dragnet franchise, following LAPD Detective Sergeant Joe Friday, in cooperation with the LAPD. Dragnet, which started as a late-1940s radio drama and moved into television in the 1950s and 1960s, was the first major mass media representation of the LAPD. Real LAPD operations inspired Webb to create the series, and close cooperation with LAPD officers let him make it as realistic as possible, including authentic police equipment, sound recording on-site at police facilities, and access to LAPD case files for story plotlines. The popularity of Dragnet's 1950s television adaptation made then-Chief William H. Parker "the most well-known and respected law enforcement official in the nation" aside from J. Edgar Hoover. The 1960s television series aired under Chiefs Thomas Reddin and Edward M. Davis, and oriented from straightforward crime-solving to internal matters and community policing, per Reddin's attempts to improve the LAPD's community relations. Adam-12, also produced by Webb, followed a pair of LAPD patrol officers, running from 1968 to 1975, longer than Dragnet's 1960s run. The show familiarized the American public with LAPD operations and procedures. It made several of the LAPD's organizational quirks, such as its black-and-white paint scheme and "to protect and serve" motto, widely recognizable and symbolic of American policing.

=== Media featuring the LAPD ===
==== Films and television ====
Films prominently featuring the LAPD and its officers include Traffic with the Devil (1946), Assault on Precinct 13 (1976), Blade Runner (1982), Blue Thunder (1983), Dragnet (1987), the Lethal Weapon series (1987–1998), Colors (1988), Die Hard (1988), Predator 2 (1990), One False Move (1992), Demolition Man (1993), Speed (1994), Heat (1995), L.A. Confidential (1997), Rush Hour (1998), Training Day (2001), 44 Minutes: The North Hollywood Shoot-Out (2003), S.W.A.T. (2003), Crash (2004), Lakeview Terrace (2008), Rampart (2011), End of Watch (2012), Gangster Squad (2013), Let's Be Cops (2014), Bright (2017), Crown Vic (2019), and Ambulance (2022).

Television series featuring the LAPD include Columbo (1968), Police Story (1973), Hunter (1984), LAPD: Life on the Beat (simply known as LAPD for its first season, 1995), The Shield (2002), The Closer (2005), Southland (2009), NCIS: Los Angeles (2009), Law & Order: LA (2010), New Girl (2011), Major Crimes (2012), Lucifer (2016), Angie Tribeca (2016), Bosch (2017), S.W.A.T. (2017), The Rookie (2018), 9-1-1 (2018), L.A.'s Finest (2019), Close Enough (2020), The Rookie: Feds (2022), and High Potential (2024).

==== Video games ====
Video games featuring the LAPD, or entities based on the LAPD, include Police Quest: Open Season (1993), the first three SWAT games (1995–1999), Future Cop: LAPD (1998), Police 911 (2000), True Crime: Streets of LA (2003), Grand Theft Auto: San Andreas (2004, showed the fictionalized version of the LAPD known as Los Santos Police Department), Ace Attorney (2005), The Shield (2007), Midnight Club: Los Angeles (2008), L.A. Noire (2011), Call of Duty: Black Ops II (2012), Grand Theft Auto V (2013, again with Los Santos Police Department as the fictionalized version of the LAPD), Need for Speed (2015), and Ready or Not (2023).

== See also ==
- Crime in Los Angeles
- Law enforcement in Los Angeles County
- List of law enforcement agencies in California
- LAPD Red Squad raid on John Reed Club art show
