= The Thin Blue Line (American TV series) =

- Country of origin: United States
- Original language: English
- No. of series: 1

Production
- Producer: William H. Parker
- Running time: 30 minutes

Original release
- Network: KNBH
- Release: 1 April – 1 September 1952

The Thin Blue Line is an American panel show that briefly aired weekly on Los Angeles NBC station KNBH in 1952. The show, contemporarily described as "unabashedly propagandistic", was produced by the Chief of the Los Angeles Police Department, William H. Parker. It featured discussion between a moderator and a panel of experts (often including Parker, who also answered audience questions). Parker intended for the show to "accurate[ly]" inform the public about "police affairs" and to "instill greater [public] confidence" in the LAPD.
