= Brian S. Bentley =

American police officer

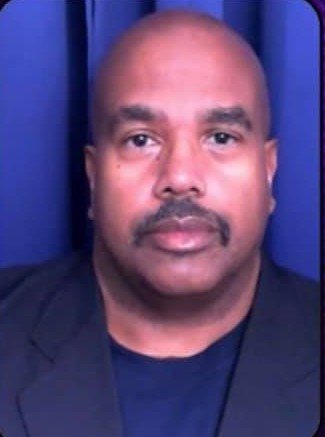
- Born: Los Angeles, CA
- Police career
- Country: United States
- Allegiance: Los Angeles
- Department: Los Angeles Police Department
- Service years: 1989 - 1999
- Rank: Sworn in as an Officer - November 1989; Police Officer II; Police Officer III
- Badge no.: 27103
- Other work: author

Brian S. Bentley is an author and a former Los Angeles Police Department officer. His first book, One Time: The Story of a South Central Los Angeles Police Officer, Bentley graphically depicts his involvement in suspect beatings and describes in detail the gratification he and his partners received from their actions. Bentley says some officers are addicted to violence and can't stop on their own. One Time lets readers see first hand how police brutality is accepted and encouraged in law enforcement. "One Time" is an urban slang term for "the Police."

== LAPD career ==
Bentley completed his probationary period at the West Los Angeles Division. He spent most of his career at Southwest Division. He was one of the few LAPD officers who lived in the division they patrolled. During eleven hours of interviewing, Internal Affairs sergeants advised Bentley that he would be fired and prosecuted if he admitted to witnessing corruption or misconduct by his coworkers. Bentley had no choice but to sign a statement and verbally deny all knowledge of police corruption in the LAPD.

Coincidentally, Bentley was a coworker and friend of convicted bank robber and Rampart police officer David Mack. Former Officer Mack was sentenced to fourteen years in federal prison for robbing a Bank of America branch and he was a partner of former Officer Rafael Pérez of Rampart Division.

Bentley has defended Officer Kevin Gaines who was accused of corruption in the Rampart Scandal, claiming he was unfairly targeted by investigator Russell Poole. Officer Kevin Gaines was shot to death by LAPD Detective Frank Lyga. Bentley states that Officer Gaines was never Suge Knight's bodyguard and never worked at Rampart Division. He was not close friends with the officers involved in the scandal.

== Personal life ==
Brian Bentley's oldest son is Jordan S. Bentley, the star of Issa Rae's reality show Sweet Life: Los Angeles and the CEO of Hypland Worldwide Clothing.
