= La Mirada, California =

City in California, United States

- City
- Flag Seal
- Motto: Dedicated to Service
- Interactive map of La Mirada, California
- Location in Los Angeles County Location in California Location in the United States
- Coordinates: 33°54′8″N 118°0′35″W
- Country: United States
- State: California
- County: Los Angeles
- Incorporated: March 23, 1960

Government
  - Type: Council–Manager
  - Mayor: Ed Eng
  - Mayor Pro Tem: Anthony Otero
  - City council: Steve De Ruse; John Lewis; Michelle Velasquez Bean
  - City manager: Jeff Boynton

Area
  - Total: 7.84 sq mi (20.30 km^{2})
  - Land: 7.82 sq mi (20.26 km^{2})
  - Water: 0.015 sq mi (0.04 km^{2}) 0.22%
- Elevation: 194 ft (59 m)

Population (2020)
  - Total: 48,008
  - Density: 6,159.6/sq mi (2,378.23/km^{2})
- Time zone: UTC-8 (Pacific)
  - Summer (DST): UTC-7 (PDT)
- ZIP codes: 90637–90639
- Area code: 562, 657/714
- FIPS code: 06-40032
- GNIS feature IDs: 1652736, 2411577
- Website: www.lamirada.gov

La Mirada is a city in southeastern Los Angeles County, California, United States, and is one of the Gateway Cities, on the border with Orange County. The population was 48,008 at the 2020 census. The La Mirada Theatre for the Performing Arts and the Splash! La Mirada Regional Aquatics Center are two of its major attractions. It is the home of Biola University, an evangelical Christian institution of higher education.

== History ==
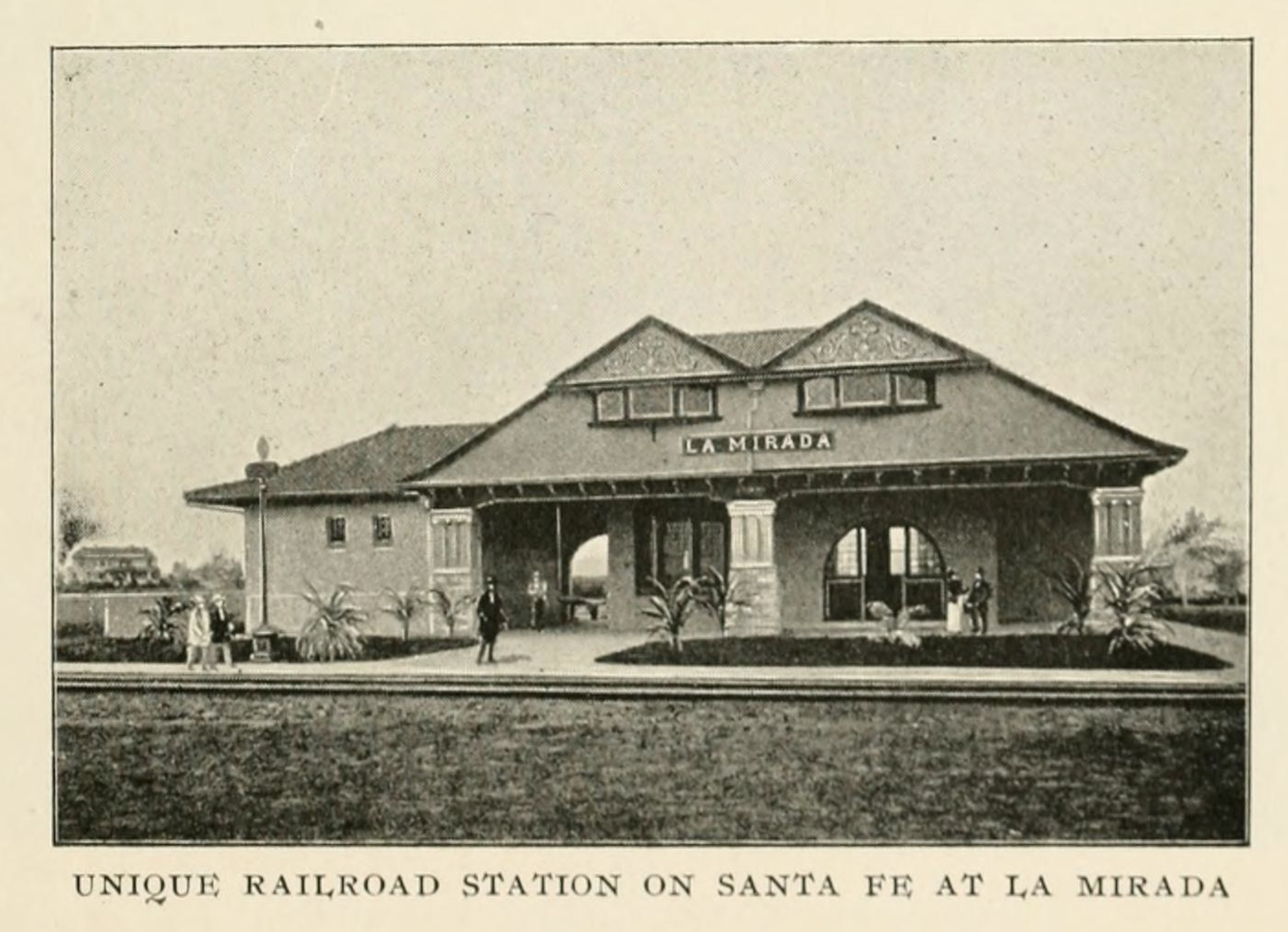
La Mirada depot, from a 1903 publication

La Mirada (Spanish for the look) was the creation of two men, Andrew McNally, a printer and mapmaker from Chicago (see Rand McNally) and his son-in-law Edwin Neff. In 1888, McNally purchased over 2,200 acres (8.9 km^{2}) of Rancho Los Coyotes, south of Whittier, for $200,000. He developed 700 acres (2.8 km^{2}) of land into his own home, Windermere Ranch, which is now the site of Neff Park, and surrounded it with olive, orange, and lemon groves. McNally built a plant to process the best-quality olive oil, as well as a railroad station on Stage Road. From here, his olive oil and fruit were shipped all over the U.S.

In 1896, McNally turned his property over to his daughter and his son-in-law. McNally and Neff formed the La Mirada Land Company, which published a booklet titled "The Country Gentleman in California" to advertise parcels of land for sale, including pictures, a map, and descriptions of the scenic olive, alfalfa, lemon, and grapefruit groves.

In 1946, "Along Your Way", a "Station by Station Description of the Santa Fe Route Through the Southwest," describes La Mirada with a population of 213, surrounded by orange, lemon, walnut, and olive groves; oil wells; an olive oil factory; and fruit packing houses.

The city received a lot of attention because it was going to be completely planned and structured. Referred to as "the Nation's completely planned city" during the early 1950s, the city of La Mirada received a lot of attention from the State Fair. The Fair praised the city for planning for the future while still maintaining practicality for today.

In 1953, the land was sold to developers for $ 5.2 million, one of the largest real estate transactions in California. In 1954, Louis M. Halper, a prominent Southland residential and commercial builder, purchased 2,100 acres of La Mirada land for $8,000,000. Halper launched construction on what was to be a $150,000,000 community with schools, shopping centers, and 10,000 homes, completing it by the end of two years. His firm had taken over the acreage from a group of corporations and Harold L. Shaw, who launched the original La Mirada development. He said at the time that the entire community would be redesigned to take full advantage of a modern planned city. Halper had developed a new pattern for community development by wholesaling land to other builders and establishing the La Mirada Civic Council to control quality. Three and four-bedroom homes were sold in the $13,000 price range. By 1960, the year the city was incorporated, La Mirada had grown from a mere 100 homes to over 8,000. The city was incorporated as "Mirada Hills" on March 23, 1960. On November 8, 1960, voters approved a name change to the current La Mirada, which was officially certified on December 15, 1960.

Today, the current population is just over 50,000, with the addition of a new subdivision on the eastern portion of the town.

== Geography ==
According to the United States Census Bureau, the city has a total area of 7.8 square miles (20.3 km^{2}), of which 7.8 square miles (20.3 km^{2}) is land and 0.015 square miles (0.04 km^{2}) (0.22%) is water. The city is on the border between Orange and Los Angeles counties. The cities that border it on the Los Angeles County side are Santa Fe Springs to the west and Cerritos to the southwest; and unincorporated areas of Los Angeles County such as East Whittier, and South Whittier to the north. The cities bordering La Mirada in Orange County are Fullerton and La Habra to the east and Buena Park to the south.

== Demographics ==
Historical population
| Census | Pop. | Note | %± |
|---|---|---|---|
| 1960 | 22,444 | | — |
| 1970 | 30,808 | | 37.3% |
| 1980 | 40,986 | | 33.0% |
| 1990 | 40,452 | | −1.3% |
| 2000 | 46,783 | | 15.7% |
| 2010 | 48,527 | | 3.7% |
| 2020 | 48,008 | | −1.1% |
U.S. Decennial Census; 1860–1870 1880–1890; 1900 1910 1920; 1930 1940 1950; 1960 1970 1980; 1990 2000 2010; 2020

La Mirada first appeared as a city under the name Mirada Hills City in the 1960 U.S. census as part of the Whittier census county division; and then as La Mirada in the 1970 U.S. census.

=== Racial and ethnic composition ===
La Mirada city, California – Racial and ethnic composition Note: the US Census treats Hispanic/Latino as an ethnic category. This table excludes Latinos from the racial categories and assigns them to a separate category. Hispanics/Latinos may be of any race.
| Race / Ethnicity (NH = Non-Hispanic) | Pop 1980 | Pop 1990 | Pop 2000 | Pop 2010 | Pop 2020 | % 1980 | % 1990 | % 2000 | % 2010 | % 2020 |
|---|---|---|---|---|---|---|---|---|---|---|
| White alone (NH) | 31,549 | 26,035 | 22,058 | 18,418 | 13,508 | 76.98% | 64.36% | 47.15% | 37.95% | 28.14% |
| Black or African American alone (NH) | 325 | 535 | 851 | 1,010 | 1,002 | 0.79% | 1.32% | 1.82% | 2.08% | 2.09% |
| Native American or Alaska Native alone (NH) | 257 | 180 | 138 | 138 | 126 | 0.63% | 0.44% | 0.29% | 0.28% | 0.26% |
| Asian alone (NH) | 1,072 | 3,182 | 6,900 | 8,530 | 10,820 | 2.62% | 7.87% | 14.75% | 17.58% | 22.54% |
| Native Hawaiian or Pacific Islander alone (NH) | 1,072 | 3,182 | 104 | 114 | 103 | 2.62% | 7.87% | 0.22% | 0.23% | 0.21% |
| Other race alone (NH) | 54 | 61 | 120 | 102 | 241 | 0.13% | 0.15% | 0.26% | 0.21% | 0.50% |
| Mixed race or Multiracial (NH) | x | x | 955 | 943 | 1,556 | x | x | 2.04% | 1.94% | 3.24% |
| Hispanic or Latino (any race) | 7,729 | 10,459 | 15,657 | 19,272 | 20,652 | 18.86% | 25.86% | 33.47% | 39.71% | 43.02% |
| Total | 40,986 | 40,452 | 46,783 | 48,527 | 48,008 | 100.00% | 100.00% | 100.00% | 100.00% | 100.00% |

=== 2020 census ===
As of the 2020 census, La Mirada had a population of 48,008 and a population density of 6,138.3 inhabitants per square mile (2,370.0/km^{2}). The median age was 42.1 years. 17.7% of residents were under the age of 18, and 19.6% were 65 years of age or older. For every 100 females, there were 92.3 males, and for every 100 females age 18 and over, there were 89.9 males.

The census reported that 95.7% of the population lived in households, 3.8% lived in non-institutionalized group quarters, and 0.5% were institutionalized. 100.0% of residents lived in urban areas, while 0.0% lived in rural areas.

There were 15,104 households, of which 32.1% had children under the age of 18 living in them. Of all households, 59.7% were married-couple households, 3.8% were cohabiting couple households, 12.7% had a male householder with no spouse or partner present, and 23.7% had a female householder with no spouse or partner present. About 17.0% of households were made up of individuals, and 10.7% had someone living alone who was 65 years of age or older. The average household size was 3.04. There were 11,878 families (78.6% of all households).

There were 15,457 housing units at an average density of 1,976.3 units per square mile (763.1 units/km^{2}), of which 15,104 (97.7%) were occupied. Of occupied units, 77.1% were owner-occupied, and 22.9% were rented. Of all housing units, 2.3% were vacant. The homeowner vacancy rate was 0.5%, and the rental vacancy rate was 3.5%.

=== 2023 estimate ===
In 2023, the US Census Bureau estimated that the median household income was $110,177, and the per capita income was $41,536. About 4.5% of families and 6.5% of the population were below the poverty line.

=== 2010 census ===
The 2010 United States census reported that La Mirada had a population of 48,527. The population density was 6,175.7 inhabitants per square mile (2,384.5/km^{2}). The racial makeup of La Mirada was 29,462 (60.7%) White (38.0% Non-Hispanic White), 1,099 (2.3%) African American, 394 (0.8%) Native American, 8,650 (17.8%) Asian, 142 (0.3%) Pacific Islander, 6,670 (13.7%) from other races, and 2,110 (4.3%) from two or more races. Hispanic or Latino of any race were 19,272 persons (39.7%).

The Census reported that 45,670 people (94.1% of the population) lived in households, 2,586 (5.3%) lived in non-institutionalized group quarters, and 271 (0.6%) were institutionalized.

There were 14,681 households, out of which 5,368 (36.6%) had children under the age of 18 living in them, 8,971 (61.1%) were opposite-sex married couples living together, 1,731 (11.8%) had a female householder with no husband present, and 802 (5.5%) had a male householder with no wife present. There were 544 (3.7%) unmarried opposite-sex partnerships, and 93 (0.6%) same-sex married couples or partnerships. 2,536 households (17.3%) were made up of individuals, and 1,578 (10.7%) had someone living alone who was 65 years of age or older. The average household size was 3.11. There were 11,504 families (78.4% of all households); the average family size was 3.48.

The population was spread out, with 10,246 people (21.1%) under the age of 18, 7,092 people (14.6%) aged 18 to 24, 11,609 people (23.9%) aged 25 to 44, 12,203 people (25.1%) aged 45 to 64, and 7,377 people (15.2%) who were 65 years of age or older. The median age was 37.9 years. For every 100 females, there were 92.2 males. For every 100 females age 18 and over, there were 89.4 males.

There were 15,092 housing units at an average density of 1,920.7 per square mile (741.6/km^{2}), of which 11,608 (79.1%) were owner-occupied, and 3,073 (20.9%) were occupied by renters. The homeowner vacancy rate was 0.8%; the rental vacancy rate was 4.0%. 36,660 people (75.5% of the population) lived in owner-occupied housing units, and 9,010 people (18.6%) lived in rental housing units.

During 2009–2013, La Mirada had a median household income of $81,961, with 7.0% of the population living below the federal poverty line.

=== 2000 census ===
At the 2000 census, Mexican (25.7%) and German (8.8%) were the most common ancestries. 10,626 (22.7%) of residents were foreign-born, which was low for Southeast and for the county. Mexico (29.7%) and Korea (16.8%) were the most common foreign places of birth.

== Government and politics ==
A five-member council governs the city under a council-manager government. Voters began electing council members by district in March 2017 to avoid litigation over alleged violations of the California Voting Rights Act. Each year, the five members vote to elect one of their number as Mayor and another as Mayor Pro Tem.

In the California State Legislature, La Mirada is in the 30th senatorial district, represented by Democrat Bob Archuleta, and in the 64th Assembly district, represented by Democrat Blanca Pacheco.

In the United States House of Representatives, La Mirada is in California's 38th congressional district, represented by Democrat Linda Sánchez.

The Los Angeles County Department of Health Services operates the Whittier Health Center in Whittier, serving La Mirada.

=== Emergency services ===
The Los Angeles County Sheriff's Department (LASD) operates the Norwalk Station in Norwalk, serving La Mirada. In addition the department operates the La Mirada Substation.

The Norwalk Station is also responsible for providing contracted police services to the city of Norwalk as well as unincorporated South Whittier. The department has a substation in La Mirada located adjacent to City Hall.

Crime in La Mirada is consistently lower than in neighboring communities and fell 8.9% in 2018 after spiking close to 30% over the three previous years, mirroring the experiences of most communities across the state.

Fire protection and paramedic services are provided by the Los Angeles County Fire Department (LACoFD). The department maintains Station #49 in La Mirada, adjacent to City Hall, and provides coverage to the city's central areas. Station 49 also serves as the headquarters for Battalion 21.

== Education ==
Public education in a majority of La Mirada is governed by the Norwalk-La Mirada Unified School District, headquartered in neighboring Norwalk. La Mirada has one public secondary school, La Mirada High School.

The Creek Park and Granada Heights neighborhoods in northern La Mirada are within the boundaries of the East Whittier City School District (K-8), the Whittier Union High School District, and Rio Hondo College, all with campuses in nearby Whittier.

Several private schools are located in La Mirada:

- St. Paul of the Cross School in the Foster Park neighborhood
- Beatitudes of Our Lord School

The city is home to one private higher education institution, Biola University.

According to the city's 2017 Demographic Overview (which is collected from sources deemed reliable, including US Census, ESRI, GCR Marketing Network, Claritas, HDL and city, state & county data), approximately 26.23% of the population have some college education, 9.8% have an associate degree, 20.08% have a Bachelor's degree, 8.05% have a Master's Degree, and 1.05% have a Doctorate Degree.

== Transportation ==
Metrolink operates commuter rail service on this right-of-way; the nearest stations to La Mirada are Buena Park and Norwalk/Santa Fe Springs. Public transportation is provided by the Los Angeles County Metropolitan Transportation Authority (Metro), Norwalk Transit, and Montebello Bus Lines. The LA Metro route 460 bus connects to downtown Los Angeles and Crypto.com Arena.

The main arterial streets running west-to-east are Rosecrans Avenue, Alondra Boulevard, and Imperial Highway. The main arterial streets running south-to-north are Valley View Avenue, La Mirada Boulevard, and Santa Gertrudes Avenue. Leffingwell Road runs along the north end of the city, and Artesia Boulevard runs along the south end of the city. Interstate 5 passes briefly through the southwest corner of the city, while Beach Boulevard (SR 39) passes briefly through the east end of the city.

Freight railroad traffic through the city is handled by BNSF Railway on its right-of-way in the southwest portion of the city. Union Pacific Railroad operates a rail line along Interstate 5 and serves the southern industrial areas south of I-5.

Construction of an Iwatani station in La Mirada is planned for hydrogen highway.

== Economy ==
Los Cerritos Community News is based in the city.

=== Top employers ===
According to the city's 2017 Demographic Overview, the top employers in the city are:

| # | Employer | # of Employees |
|---|---|---|
| 1 | Biola University | 1,365 |
| 2 | Norwalk-La Mirada Unified School District | 843 |
| 3 | US Food Service | 650 |
| 4 | Kindred Hospital La Mirada | 266 |
| 5 | City of La Mirada | 306 |

== Notable people ==
- Gary Allan, country singer, born in La Mirada
- Derby Carrillo, soccer player who represented the El Salvador national team
- Tony Corrente, NFL referee
- Chase De Leo, professional ice hockey player for the New Jersey Devils
- Jennie Finch, Olympic softball player
- Oz Fox of heavy metal band Stryper, formed in La Mirada in 1981 as Roxx Regime
- Steven L. Kwast, Air Force lieutenant general
- Janine Lindemulder, porn actress
- Cole McDonald, football player for the Toronto Argonauts
- Keith McGill, football player for the Oakland Raiders
- Shotaro Omori, American figure skater
- Daniel Poncedeleon, Major League Baseball pitcher for the St. Louis Cardinals
- Russell Poole, an LAPD Detective noted for the investigation into the deaths of rap star Notorious B.I.G. and the cop to cop shooting between LAPD officers, Kevin Gaines and Frank Lyga. In addition to uncovering the LAPD's notorious Rampart Scandal
- Amber Riley, actress and singer best known for her role in Glee
- Robbie Rist, actor/musician noted for his role as Cousin Oliver in The Brady Bunch
- * Brothers Michael & Robert Sweet of heavy metal band Stryper, formed in La Mirada in 1981 as Roxx Regime
- Ryan Vargas, NASCAR driver
- Derrick Williams, basketball player for the Sacramento Kings
- Eric Winter, actor best known for his role in Days of Our Lives
- YTCracker, former hacker, nerdcore rapper
