= Brian Liddy =

Los Angeles Police Department officer

- Born: September 16, 1965 (age 60); Hartford, Connecticut, U.S.
- Police career
- Country: United States
- Allegiance: Los Angeles
- Department: Los Angeles Police Department
- Service years: 1990–2006
- Rank: Sworn in as an Officer (1990); Police Officer II; Police Officer III (1995); Detective I (1998); Sergeant I (1999)
- Awards: LAPD Medal of Valor; LAPD Medal for Heroism; Human Relations Medal; 1992 Civil Disturbance Ribbon; Parade Magazine and International Association of Chiefs of Police, Special Citation for Bravery - 1993; California Peace Officer's Association Award for Merit and Bravery 1993; Los Angeles Police Department Emerald Society Award for Distinguished Heroic Service (September 8, 1993); 144 Los Angeles Police Department Commendations for Outstanding Police Work, Dedication to Duty, Bravery, and Excellence in Police Work.
- Other work: Executive and Dignitary protection, security consultant, private investigator, film consultant, police procedure expert consultant/witness.

Brian Liddy is a former officer of the Los Angeles Police Department. Liddy, together with Sgt. Edward Ortiz and former Officer Michael Buchanan, were the first to be charged with criminal wrongdoing in the Rampart Scandal. Liddy was both the highest-ranking and the most decorated LAPD officer to be directly implicated by Rafael Perez, based upon his testimony and allegations.

Their convictions in the Rampart scandal were thrown out by a judge. The officers later sued in civil proceedings and, seven years later, the United States Court of Appeals for the Ninth Circuit upheld the lower court's ruling in their favor. Nearly $19 million went to resolve a federal jury verdict from 2006 that awarded $5 million each to Liddy, LAPD Officer Paul Harper, and LAPD Sgt. Edward Ortiz. A fourth man, former LAPD Officer Michael Buchanan, shared in a smaller settlement in another case. $20.5 million resolved six cases involving the officers. led to questions of Perez's credibility.

== Early career ==
In 1993, almost three years after joining the force in 1990, Liddy was awarded the department's Medal of Valor for actions taken during a shoot-out during the Rodney King riots in 1992, while stationed at the 77th Street Division. In 1995, Liddy transferred to the Rampart Division's CRASH unit at the same time as Rafael Perez, who would later implicate Sgt. Liddy and over 70 other officers in several instances of police misconduct.

== Rampart Scandal ==
More than 100 criminal cases were overturned after former LAPD Officer Rafael Perez testified that he, his partner and other officers (including Liddy) stationed in the Rampart CRASH unit had routinely framed gang members for crimes they did not commit. Perez made his allegations in exchange for leniency after he was caught stealing cocaine from a police evidence locker. However, the credibility of Perez has been undermined by his testimony in several internal affairs investigations in which three officers, including Liddy, accused of crimes or misconduct were found not guilty or the charges were dropped.

=== Trial ===
Liddy, along with Sgt. Edward Ortiz and Officer Paul Harper, were the first to be charged with conspiring to obstruct justice by then-Los Angeles District Attorney Gil Garcetti based on Perez's testimony. The criminal case against the Rampart officers revolved around a 1996 incident in which two reputed gang members were convicted of hitting Harper and Liddy with a pickup truck in an alley. Perez told authorities three years later that the officers made up the story to frame the pair. In a highly publicized trial in 2000, a Superior Court jury convicted the three officers of the charges, based on Perez's testimony. Afterward, however, Judge Jacqueline Connor vacated the verdicts, saying she had made a “fatal error” in not recognizing that jurors might have misread some "jargon" in the police report that unintentionally lent support to the claim that the officers had lied.

=== Lawsuit ===
After their acquittals, in separate federal civil rights lawsuits filed on August 6, 2005, Liddy and the two other men charged in the trial accused former Los Angeles Police Chief Bernard C. Parks and the LAPD of using them as “scapegoats” to satisfy the media during the scandal involving the Rampart Division's anti-gang unit, and that they were charged due to questionable testimony from Perez and other witnesses.

In his lawsuit, Liddy alleged that a disciplinary board criticized internal affairs investigators for giving questionable facts to witnesses with criminal backgrounds who testified against the officers. The LAPD Board of Rights' official report stated the witnesses’ recollections were “potentially tainted by the interview process and raised serious questions regarding their credibility,” according to the lawsuit. The board unanimously overruled discipline for Liddy, his lawsuit states. Disciplinary proceedings against Ortiz were pending. The three plaintiffs also accused the department of concealing from the district attorney's office the names of witnesses who could have corroborated defense claims that Perez lied in his testimony about the officers.

A civil jury awarded Liddy over five million dollars for violation of his civil rights in 2006. In January 2009, Liddy and the other two officers settled with the city on two other cases that alleged wrongful termination, and violation of civil rights. Liddy medically retired from the police department in 2006.
