= LAPD Rampart Division =

Division of the Los Angeles Police Department

Los Angeles Police Department Rampart Division
- Common name: Rampart Division (Patrol Area #2) aka: "The Castle"
- Motto: To Protect and To Serve

Agency overview
- Formed: 1933

Jurisdictional structure
- Operations jurisdiction: Los Angeles, California, United States
- Area: 7.9 sq mi (20 km^{2})
- Population: Approx. 375,000
- Legal jurisdiction: City of Los Angeles, California

Operational structure
- Headquarters: Rampart Community Police Station; 1401 West 6th Street; Los Angeles, CA
- Police Officers: Approx. 350
- Unsworn members: Approx. 15
- Agency executives: Jim McDonnell, Chief of Police; Jose Perez, Deputy Chief—Central Bureau; James Roberts, Captain III—Commanding Officer
- Parent agency: Los Angeles Police Department

Website
- Official website

The Rampart Division of the Los Angeles Police Department (LAPD) serves communities to the west of Downtown Los Angeles (DTLA) including Silver Lake, Echo Park, Pico-Union, Westlake, and Rampart Village, all together designated as the Rampart patrol area. Its name is derived from Rampart Boulevard, one of the principal thoroughfares in its patrol area. The original station opened in 1966, located at 2710 West Temple Street. In 2008, the staff moved southeast to a newer facility located at 1401 West 6th Street. With 164,961 residents occupying a 5.4-square-mile (14 km^{2}) area, Rampart is one of Los Angeles's most densely populated communities.

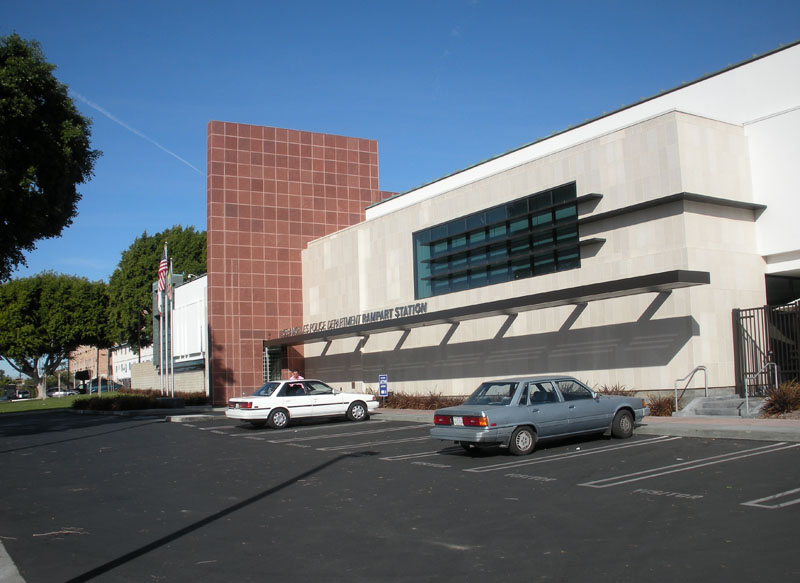
Rampart police station

== History ==
The Los Angeles Police Department's (LAPD) Rampart Division (#02) was created in October 1966. It was formed from portions of LAPD's Central, Wilshire, University (now Southwest), and Hollywood Areas. William H. Parker was the chief of police at the time, and he stated that the new Rampart Division was needed to decrease the span between the Metropolitan, Hollywood, and Wilshire Areas. Several locations for the original station were considered before the Rampart Heights area was finally chosen in 1961. In 1963, the property at the southwest corner of Temple St and Benton Way was obtained, and construction began in December 1964. The total cost of the site, design, construction, equipment and furnishings was $1,419,397.

The LAPD Rampart Division Station, located at 2710 West Temple Street officially opened on October 23, 1966, under the command of Captain R. O. Bradley. Rampart Area spanned approximately 13.7 square miles (35 km^{2}) and served approximately 200,000 citizens. Its borders at the time were: Normandie Ave on the west; Santa Monica Bl, Hyperion Ave, and the Los Angeles River to the North; the 110-Pasadena/Harbor Freeway to the east; and the 10-Santa Monica Freeway to the south. As the population grew and more personnel were needed to serve the area, space became an issue. Detective functions were eventually relocated to a separate building, located at 303 S. Union Avenue.

After 40 years of wear and tear, the time came to replace the original station on Temple St. A decision was made to build the new station on the site where the aging Central Receiving Hospital was then located. The new Rampart Community Police Station, located at 1401 W. 6th St., opened its doors on July 25, 2008, under the command of Captain III John Egan and Captain I Paul Hernandez. It was assigned approximately 275 Police Officers, 55 Detectives, and 50 civilian personnel. The new station re-united Rampart Patrol and Detectives under one roof again, serving approximately 375,000 people in an 8-square-mile (21 km^{2}) area.

Soon after the new Rampart Station opened, the LAPD created a new Division, the Olympic Area (#20). On January 4, 2009, Olympic Community Police Station opened its doors and assumed responsibility for a portion of what was formerly the west side of Rampart Division, from Normandie to Hoover Street. Currently, Rampart Division has about 330 personnel that provide service to approximately 164,961 inhabitants in a compact 5.54-square-mile (14.3 km^{2}) area. The population density of the Rampart Area is similar to Manhattan Island. It serves the communities of Angeleno Heights, Echo Park, Silver Lake, Historic Filipinotown, Korea Town, Lafayette Park, MacArthur Park, Pico-Union, Temple-Beaudry, Virgil Village, and Westlake.

== Rampart Community Police Advisory Board (C-PAB) ==
The Rampart CPAB operates through committees that focus on specific issues such as traffic, crime, youth programs, and membership. Each member engages with the community and serves as a point of contact between residents and the Los Angeles Police Department's Rampart Division. CPAB members work to communicate community concerns and feedback to the Rampart Area Division and share relevant information with local residents.

Community-Police Advisory Boards (C-PABs) were created in 1993 to provide community members with an opportunity to provide information and advice to their respective Area and to take information from the police department back to the community. Each of the 21 geographic Areas (community police stations) throughout Los Angeles has its own C-PAB. These advisory groups meet monthly to discuss crime and quality of life issues. Each C-PAB has two co-chairs, one of the Area commanding officers while the second is a civilian member voted on by the membership. Recently, many C-PABs have formed subcommittees in addition to the general group to tackle specific crime and quality of life problems. Examples of C-PAB subcommittees include Graffiti, Youth, Homeless Outreach and Traffic.

== Neighborhood Councils ==
Through a network of Neighborhood Councils, the City of Los Angeles promotes public participation in government and works to improve government responsiveness to local concerns.

- East Hollywood Neighborhood Council
- Greater Echo Park Elysian Neighborhood Council
- MacArthur Park Neighborhood Council
- Pico Union Neighborhood Council
- Rampart Village Neighborhood Council
- Silver Lake Neighborhood Council
- Westlake North Neighborhood Council
- Westlake South Neighborhood Council
- Wilshire Center Koreatown

== Criminal street gangs ==
Rampart may have been one of the most disputed gang territories in LA. There is numerous criminal street gangs in the Rampart Area. They include, but are not limited to 18th St, MS-13, Echo Park, Rockwood, Temple St, Witmer St, Clanton 14, Wanderers, Varrio Vista Rifa, Head Hunters, Diamond St, and La Mirada Locos.

== Notable events ==
=== November 9, 2004 – Hostage taker at the Mexican consulate ===
On Tuesday, November 9, 2004, at approximately 8:30 a.m., Los Angeles Police received a 911 call of a man with a gun attempting to take a hostage inside the Mexican Consulate at 2401 W. 6th Street. Rampart Division Patrol Officers responded, and while setting up a perimeter saw a male suspect leave the building with a woman he was holding hostage. The suspect was holding her tightly from behind, with his arm around her neck and was armed with what appeared to be a handgun. Sergeant Hector Feliciano fired one round from his handgun, striking the suspect, who released the hostage and fell to the ground. The suspect was later identified as 19-year-old Manuel Jubenal Ortiz, and the gun he was carrying was determined to be a starter pistol. The victim, 31-year-old Dunia Gonzalez, who was pregnant and an employee of the Mexican Consulate, was not injured. She was taken safely away from the scene by another Rampart officer. The suspect, who was injured in the officer involved shooting, was taken by rescue ambulance to the University of Southern California Medical Center (USCMC), where he later died. The FBI was handling the criminal investigation with assistance from Robbery-Homicide Division. The drama unfolded on live TV. Sergeant Feliciano received the LAPD's Medal of Valor and an honorable mention commendation at the TOP COPS Award Ceremony, by NAPO.

=== September 11, 2012 – Pursuit and shoot-out with murder and carjack suspect ===
On September 11, 2012, Rampart officers observed a vehicle reported stolen at gunpoint earlier in the day from the North Hollywood Area. Officers attempted to pull it over about 6 p.m. near the intersection of Sunset Boulevard and Rosemont Avenue but the suspect refused, leading police on a pursuit through Echo Park, Silver Lake and downtown for more than an hour. During the pursuit officers recognized the suspect as a person wanted in connection with a homicide earlier in the year. The chase ended when the driver crashed into another vehicle at the intersection of South Bixel and West 7th streets. The suspect exited the stolen car with an assault rifle and engaged officers in shoot-out until he was wounded and taken into custody. No officers were hurt. The civilian from the car that the suspect crashed into was rescued by officers and led away to safety. For their actions of bravery above and beyond the call of duty, officers from LAPD's Rampart, Olympic, and Metropolitan Divisions were recognized at a White House ceremony by President Barack Obama, and honored with the prestigious Top Cop Award by NAPO.

== Rampart scandal ==
The Community Resources Against Street Hoodlums (CRASH) anti-gang program, initiated under the direction of LAPD Chief Daryl F. Gates in the late 1970s, had encountered some success in the Rampart Division. However, in 1998–2000, graphic allegations of extreme police misconduct among Rampart's CRASH squad began to emerge. This misconduct involved several officers and detectives, most notably Rafael Perez. Perez was suspected of being involved in a bank robbery committed by another Rampart Division officer, David Mack; he also stole 6 lbs. of cocaine from an LAPD evidence locker, which eventually led to his arrest. His most egregious act involved the shooting—and framing—of unarmed gang member Javier Ovando. Perez originally claimed that Ovando had opened fire at both Perez and another officer, Nino Durden. The two officers then returned fire, leaving Ovando paralyzed. Perez and Durden then framed Ovando for the attack, and he was found guilty and sentenced to 23 years in prison (Ovando was released when Perez admitted to shooting and framing him). After several other incidents, the LAPD became suspicious of Perez and began to investigate him. Perez later pleaded guilty to the cocaine theft in exchange for information about other corrupt officers within the Rampart Division. In turn, Perez implicated approximately 70 officers of misconduct.

== Popular culture ==
- Adam-12 (TV series)

Although not set in the Rampart Division, the long-running television series Adam-12 featured the Rampart Division station on Temple Street as the setting for the series. However, according to the radio call sign of the unit "1-Adam 12", the station is actually the Central Division station (Division One), which serves Downtown Los Angeles.

- Southland (TV series)

Southland featured the new Rampart Division station at 1401 W. 6th St in roll call room and station scenes. The critically acclaimed series ran from 2009 to 2013. Southland takes a "raw and authentic look" at Los Angeles and the lives of the LAPD officers who police it. The show's first season centers on the experiences and interactions of LAPD patrol officers and detectives, and is more a character-driven drama than a police procedural. Among the characters are rookie Officer Ben Sherman and his training officer, John Cooper who, unknown to most of his colleagues, is homosexual; Detective Lydia Adams, who must balance work with the responsibility of living with her mother; Officer Chickie Brown, who aspires to be the first woman on the LAPD's elite SWAT team; and Detective Sammy Bryant, whose home life interferes with his working life. After its first season on NBC, Southland moved to TNT network. The second season placed less emphasis on the ensemble cast, instead focusing more on the Adams, Sherman, Cooper and Bryant characters and their partners. Also, the weekly stories centered more on how crimes came together, with fewer serialized story lines.

- Colors (film)

The 1988 film Colors, starring Academy Award-winning actors Robert Duvall and Sean Penn (and directed by Dennis Hopper), attempted to realistically show police work by portraying the lives of a veteran and a rookie LAPD officer partnered together in a gang-infested part of Los Angeles. The film actually uses the real-life CRASH acronym as the division Duvall and Penn's characters are working under.

- Training Day (film)

The 2001 film Training Day starred Academy Award-winner Denzel Washington and Ethan Hawke (and was directed by Antoine Fuqua). The film, as the title suggests, follows a single day in the life of a young LAPD officer, Jake Hoyt (Hawke), as he is subjected to a uniquely challenging evaluation by Alonzo Harris (Washington), a highly decorated detective with the LAPD narcotics division, to see if he has what it takes to be a "narc" (narcotics officer). The entire film takes place over a single intense 24-hour period in Los Angeles. It was partly based on and heavily influenced by the Rampart Division CRASH unit and the surrounding scandal.

- Crash (film)

In the 2004 film, Crash, an off-duty black police officer is shot by an off-duty white officer in a turn of events very similar to the shooting of Kevin Gaines. The said black officer is, later, found to be corrupt, just like in the case of Kevin Gaines. However, in the film the corrupt nature of the black officer is suppressed by the city district attorney in order to not lose the black vote.

- The Shield (TV series)

FX Networks' hit series The Shield is inspired by Rampart's C.R.A.S.H. unit. Originally called "Rampart" when the first ads were run, the show's title was later changed at the request of the LAPD. By calling the show "Rampart", the LAPD claimed that the show's graphic content would portray them as corrupt. Consequently, the show was set up in the fictional Farmington Division ("the Farm") of Los Angeles (based on East and South Central Los Angeles), using a converted church ("the Barn") as their police station. The show primarily follows the activities of Detective Vic Mackey (portrayed by Emmy winner Michael Chiklis) and the corrupt detectives under his command, Shane Vendrell, Curtis Lemansky, and Ronnie Gardocki, who make up the "Strike Team", a special experimental LAPD unit specializing in anti-gang activity and anti-drug and weapon trafficking.

- Dirty (film)

Another portrayal of the Rampart Scandal can be seen in the film Dirty, which follows two corrupt members of an LAPD anti-gang unit (portrayed by Clifton Collins, Jr. and Academy Award winner Cuba Gooding, Jr.) through a day at work, showing actions such as the killing of gang members, theft of narcotics evidence, and planting of evidence on shooting victims, and showing the eventual consequences of these actions.

- Echo Park (novel)

Echo Park is a novel by Michael Connelly. A serendipitous traffic stop in L.A.'s Echo Park neighborhood nabs Reynard Waits, a man with body parts in his van on the floorboard in front of the front seat. Detective Freddy Olivas is working the case and Richard O'Shea is the prosecutor assigned. Soon Waits has confessed to a string of slayings involving prostitutes and runaways, as well as to two earlier murders: one of a pawnshop owner during the 1992 riots, the other of Marie Gesto.

- Faster (film)

In 2010, the crime drama movie Faster featured a police officer played by Billy Bob Thornton who is revealed to be a corrupt former Rampart CRASH officer.

- Rampart (film)

Rampart is a 2011 feature film derived from the Rampart Scandal and starring Woody Harrelson, Ben Foster and Ice Cube. Based on a James Ellroy screenplay that covers both the scandal and the LAPD C.R.A.S.H. units involved, the film was directed and co-written by Oren Moverman. Harrelson portrays Dave Brown, a personally and professionally conflicted LAPD officer caught up in the aftermath of the scandal which brings him to the attention of Kyle Timkins (Ice Cube) as an internal affairs investigator. Filming was completed in December 2010 in LA.

- GTA San Andreas (Video Game)

The plot of Rockstar Games' controversial video game Grand Theft Auto: San Andreas, set in 1992 in a fictional version of Los Angeles, involves two corrupt CRASH officers and one that disagrees with the others. The CRASH motto, "intimidate those who intimidate others", is spoken directly by one of these characters during the course of the game.

== Locations of interest in Rampart Area ==
- Echo Park
- Carroll Avenue Victorian Homes
- Los Angeles Area Chamber of Commerce
- Los Angeles Center Studios
- MacArthur Park
- Original Tommy's
