= Rampart Village, Los Angeles =

Neighborhood in Los Angeles, California, US

Rampart Village
- Neighborhood of Los Angeles
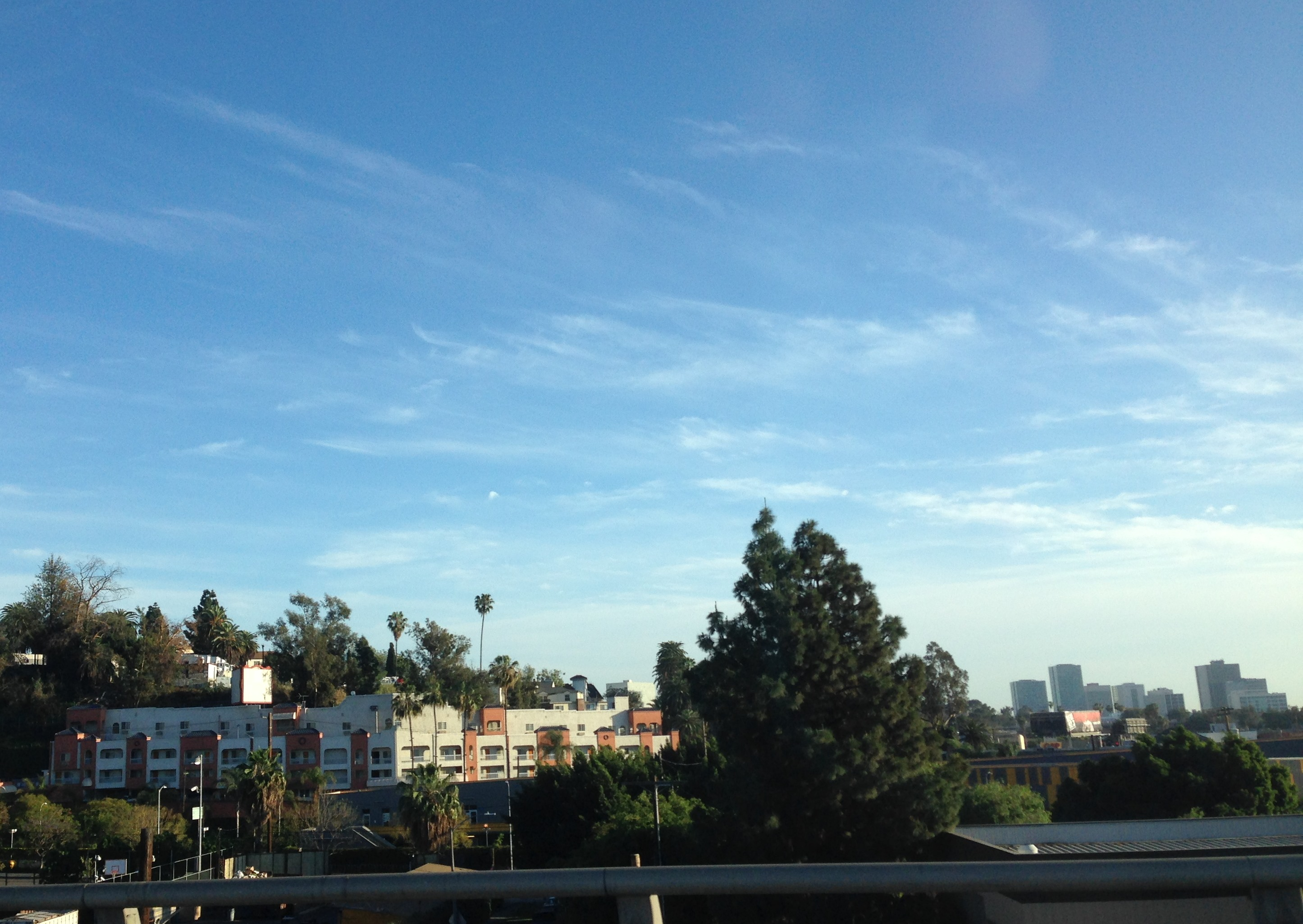
- Rampart Village in 2015

- Location within Los Angeles
- Coordinates: 34°04′15″N 118°17′04″W
- Country: United States
- State: California
- County: Los Angeles
- City: Los Angeles
- Time zone: Pacific
- zip code: 90057, 90004, 90026, 90020
- Area code: 323

Rampart Village is a neighborhood located in Central Los Angeles within Los Angeles, California.

== Geography ==
According to the Rampart Village Neighborhood Council, the area of Rampart Village borders the Hollywood Freeway on the north, Vermont Avenue on the east, Benton Way on the northwest, 3rd Street, Lafayette Park, and Rampart Boulevard to the southeast, and 6th Street to the southwest.

== History ==
During the late 20th century, the CRASH unit of the Los Angeles Police Department was known to patrol areas of Rampart Village. In 2018, The Boring Company proposed a tunnel called the "Dugout Loop" that would connect from Dodger Stadium to either Los Feliz, East Hollywood, or Rampart Village, but was ultimately cancelled. In April of 2021, Los Angeles's first city-funded homeless shelter named "Safe Sleep Village" opened up in Rampart Village, as a response to the high concentration of homelessness in the area.

== Government and infrastructure ==
Los Angeles Fire Department Station 6 serves Rampart Village.

Rampart Village is under the jurisdiction of the LAPD Rampart Division and is represented by the Rampart Village Neighborhood Council.

Rampart Village is also locally within Los Angeles's 13th City Council district and federally within California's 34th congressional district.

== Education ==
Schools within Rampart Village are:

=== Public ===
- Everest Value School

=== Private ===
- New Village Girls Academy
- Precious Blood Catholic School

== Parks and Recreation ==
- Lafayette Park
- Shatto Recreation Center

== Filming locations ==
- The 1924 film Girl Shy contains several scenes that were filmed on the streets of Rampart Village.
