= Russell Poole =

American detective (1956–2015)

- Born: Russell Wayne Poole; November 29, 1956; La Mirada, California, U.S.
- Died: August 19, 2015 (aged 58); Los Angeles, California, U.S.
- Police career
- Country: United States
- Allegiance: Los Angeles
- Department: Los Angeles Police Department
- Service years: 1981–1999
- Rank: Sworn in as an Officer (1981); Police Officer II; Police Officer III (1984); Detective I (1987); Detective II (1996)
- Other work: Author, private investigator

Russell Wayne Poole (November 29, 1956 – August 19, 2015) was a Los Angeles Police Department detective who investigated the murder of the Notorious B.I.G. (Christopher Wallace), a rapper also known as Biggie Smalls. Poole also investigated the killing of LAPD Officer Kevin Gaines by LAPD Officer Frank Lyga on March 18, 1997. After retiring in 1999, he formed a private detective agency.

== Early career ==
The son of a 27-year L.A. County Sheriff, Poole would "follow in his father's footsteps" and join the LAPD in 1981. He rose quickly, becoming a detective trainee only three years after being sworn in. Before being chosen to work in the Robbery-Homicide division in 1996, he spent over nine years as a homicide investigator at the South Bureau and Wilshire Division. He served as the primary investigator (taking a case all the way through to trial) on at least 135 homicide cases, and assisted on over 500 more cases. A noteworthy case investigated personally by Poole before the Rampart scandal includes the murder of Ennis Cosby, son of comedian Bill Cosby. He also was one of the officers involved in the investigation into the North Hollywood shootout, just days before the murder of the Notorious B.I.G. Throughout his career up to his involvement in the Rampart scandal, Poole was a highly respected and decorated LAPD detective.

== LAPD Rampart investigation ==
Poole's involvement in the Rampart scandal began less than six months before Wallace's murder and a year before Rafael Pérez was arrested. His involvement started when Poole and his Robbery/Homicide unit partner Fred Miller were assigned to investigate the March 1997 Studio City shooting death of plainclothes LAPD Officer Kevin Gaines. Gaines was killed in a road rage dispute after he brandished a gun at another motorist, who turned out to be undercover officer, Frank Lyga.

=== Death of Notorious B.I.G. ===
On March 9, 1997, at around 12:30 a.m., Wallace, Bad Boy Records CEO, Sean Combs, and their entourage left the 11th Annual Soul Train Music Awards after-party, held at the Petersen Automotive Museum, in two GMC Suburbans to return to his hotel after an announcement was made that the party would finish earlier than planned. Biggie traveled in the front passenger seat of the second Suburban alongside his associates, Damion "D-Rock" Butler, Junior M.A.F.I.A. member Lil' Cease and driver, Gregory "G-Money" Young. Combs traveled in the first vehicle with three bodyguards. The two vehicles were trailed by a Chevrolet Blazer carrying Bad Boy's director of security.

By 12:45 a.m., the streets were crowded with cars full of people leaving the event. Wallace's truck stopped at a red light 50 yards (46 m) from the museum. While waiting for the light to change, a white Toyota Land Cruiser made a U-turn and cut in between Wallace's vehicle and the Chevrolet Blazer behind. Simultaneously, a dark Chevrolet Impala pulled up alongside Wallace's SUV. The driver of the Impala, an African-American male, rolled down his window, drew a 9mm blue-steel pistol, and fired several rounds into the GMC Suburban; four bullets hit Wallace in the chest. Wallace was rushed to Cedars-Sinai Medical Center by Combs and the rest of Wallace's entourage, but was pronounced dead by doctors at 1:15 a.m.

=== Investigation of Notorious B.I.G.'s death ===
After months of investigating, Poole accused LAPD Officer David Mack, along with Mack's friend, Amir Muhammad, of being complicit in the murder of Christopher Wallace. Poole claimed he had enough evidence to prove Mack had ties to the CEO of Death Row Records, Marion "Suge" Knight. He suspected Mack and possibly other officers took part in the murder. Poole had sources that confirmed Mack was raised in the same Compton neighborhood, and was in the same gang as Knight (the Bloods). Mack was a frequent visitor at Knight's private parties, and frequently wore the same style and color (red) clothes as Knight and the Bloods gang. Much of Poole's investigation was used as the basis for Randall Sullivan's book, LAbyrinth: A Detective Investigates the Murders of Tupac Shakur and Notorious B.I.G., the Implication of Death Row Records' Suge Knight, and the Origins of the Los Angeles Police Scandal. The book formed the basis for the highly anticipated 2018 film City of Lies, starring Johnny Depp as Poole. The film was released on December 8, 2018, at the Noir film festival.

=== Chief Parks' involvement and Poole's resignation ===
Poole sent his findings to the then-chief of the Los Angeles Police Department, Bernard C. Parks, who ordered Poole to cease all investigations of Officer David Mack. In protest of Parks' and the LAPD's handling of the case, Poole reluctantly and in protest resigned a day before retirement from the department in late 1999. Distraught from the order to end the Mack investigation early and forced retirement, Poole later stated that "I almost took my life, but it was my kids that actually saved me." Furthermore, he filed a lawsuit against the LAPD for violating his First Amendment rights by preventing him from going to the public with his findings. Poole, as a private investigator, continued independently investigating Wallace's murder on his own. He was included in a 2001 interview with VH1 in the documentary film Biggie & Tupac released in 2001 by British documentary filmmaker Nick Broomfield.

=== Tupac:187 ===
Tupac:187, written by Richard RJ Bond, Michael Douglas Carlin, with a contribution by Russell Poole, is an alternate theory in the murder of Tupac Shakur.

== Death ==
While discussing the Wallace and Tupac Shakur cases for an upcoming nonfiction book, Chaos Merchants, Poole died of a heart attack at the Monterey Park office of the Los Angeles County Sheriff's Department on August 19, 2015.

== In popular culture ==
Poole was portrayed by Johnny Depp in the 2018 film City of Lies.

In 2018, Jimmi Simpson starred as Poole in Unsolved: Tupac & Biggie.

== Bibliography ==
- LAbyrinth: A Detective Investigates the Murders of Tupac Shakur and Notorious B.I.G., the Implication of Death Row Records' Suge Knight, and the Origins of the Los Angeles Police Scandal, Atlantic Monthly Press, ISBN 978-0-87113-838-5.
- Chaos Merchants: Murders of Tupac Shakur and Notorious BIG, Amazon Kindle, ASIN: B01A2VbbbYJTO.
