= New Village Girls Academy =

Coordinates: 34.071450°N 118.279667°W

- Los Angeles, California

Information
- Type: Charter Highschool
- Motto: reimagine what's possible
- Established: 2006
- School district: Los Angeles
- Principal: Jennifer Quinones
- Grades: 9–12
- Gender: All girl
- Website: Official website

New Village Girls Academy is an all-girls high school located in Rampart Village near downtown Los Angeles. Enrollment is open to all girls (ages 14 to 22) from Los Angeles County. The school intentionally seeks and serves young women who are facing difficult personal circumstances that make graduation from a traditional high school unlikely.

New Village offers individualized education plans, Special Education and English language development support, and small learning environments with dedicated advisor/teachers. Its A-G curriculum qualifies graduates for admission to the University of California and other four-year colleges. The school also supports students in pursuing vocational training and preparing for meaningful careers through its internship program.

The school's programs include workplace readiness, career exploration, mentored internships, science classes at the California Science Center, an environmental engineering class, a makerspace, after-school academic support, sports and enrichment, counseling and case management by the school psychologist, schoolwide mindfulness practice and monthly Wellness Days, outdoor education, individual student and family wellness support and emergency assistance, college readiness including college tours and financial aid workshops, and summer school. Non-profit partners provide free childcare, mental health services, medical care, mentoring, gang intervention, baby supplies, and essentials for homeless students.

New Village's senior class graduation rate is consistently above 90 percent, with all students (except exempt youth) achieving an A-G diploma. More than 75 percent of graduates continue to college or vocational training. Many are the first in their families to graduate, and almost all who go to college are first-generation students.

== Charter school ==
New Village Girls Academy is the first all-girl charter school in California.
