= Hank Brandt =

American film and television actor

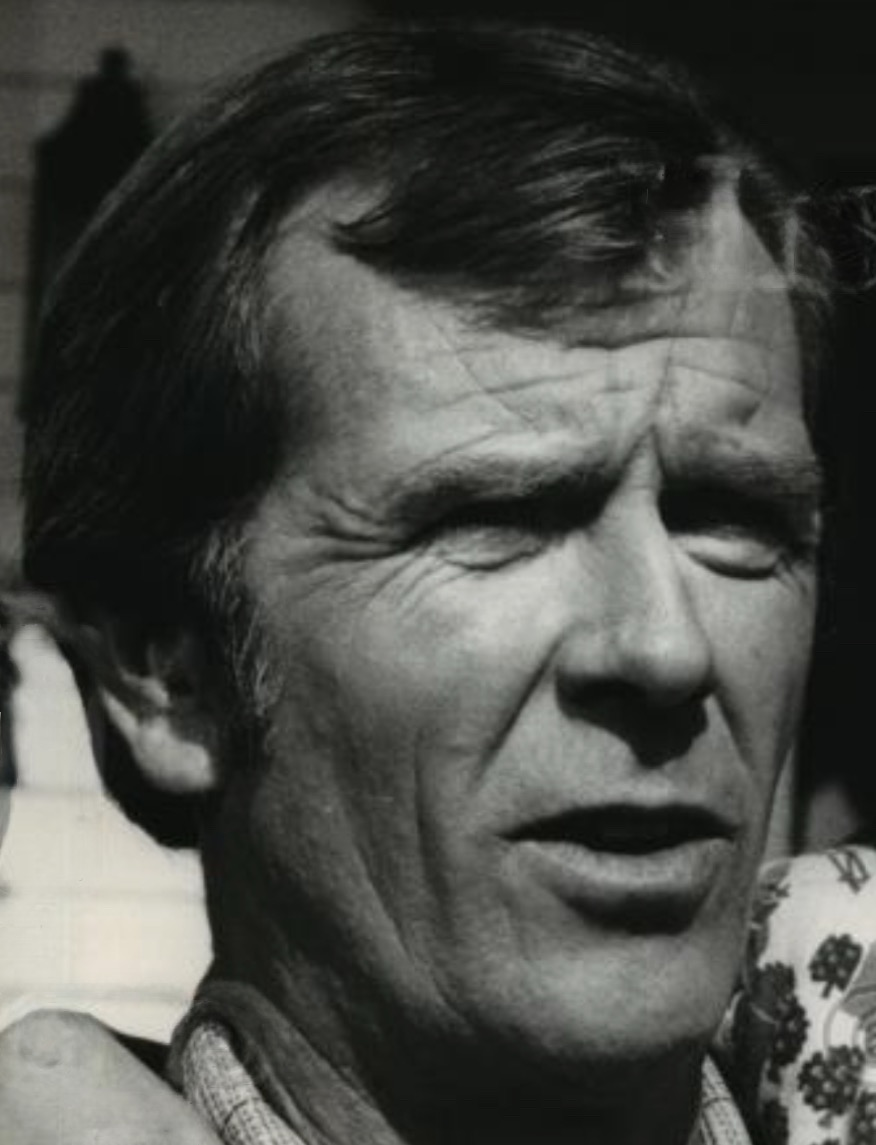
- Brandt in 1980
- Born: Henry William Haar Jr. June 4, 1934; East Orange, New Jersey, U.S.
- Died: December 4, 2004 (aged 70)
- Occupation: Actor
- Years active: 1961–2004

Hank Brandt (born Henry William Haar Jr.; June 4, 1934 – December 4, 2004) was an American film and television actor. He was known for playing Leonard Waggedorn in the American sitcom television series Julia from 1968 to 1971.

== Life and career ==
Brandt was born in East Orange, New Jersey. He began his career in 1961, appearing in an episode of the anthology television series Alfred Hitchcock Presents as a police investigator. He continued appearing in films and television programs, including playing the role of the police officer Leonard Waggedorn in the NBC sitcom series Julia (1968–1971).

Brandt guest-starred in numerous television programs including Wagon Train, Mission: Impossible, The F.B.I., Tales of Wells Fargo, Columbo, Hawaii Five-O, The Jack Benny Program, Perry Mason, Barnaby Jones, Gunsmoke and Combat!, and played the recurring role of Morgan Hess in the ABC soap opera television series Dynasty from 1982 to 1988. He also appeared in films such as Telefon, Dumb and Dumber, Kingpin, Soldier Boyz and Escape from Alcatraz. He narrated the syndicated reality television program LAPD: Life on the Beat from 1996 to 1999. He last appeared in the 2004 film 50 Ways to Leave Your Lover, playing Hal.

== Death ==
Brandt died on December 4, 2004, at the age of 70.
