= Call Me King =

- Theatrical release poster
- Directed by: R.L. Scott
- Written by: R.L. Scott
- Produced by: David A. Fisher; R.L. Scott
- Starring: Amin Joseph; Bai Ling; Chris Mulkey; Bill Cobbs
- Cinematography: R.L. Scott
- Music by: Darren Wonnacott; George Kallis
- Production companies: Dark Energy Pictures; Shadow Motion Pictures
- Distributed by: GVN Releasing
- Release date: September 4, 2015
- Running time: 118 minutes
- Country: United States
- Language: English

Call Me King is a 2015 American action crime drama written, produced and directed by R.L. Scott. Scott is also the film's cinematographer and choreographed the film's fight sequences. Call Me King had a limited theatrical release in the United States on September 4, 2015 during the Labor Day holiday weekend.

== Cast ==
- Amin Joseph as Rhyis
- Bai Ling as Li Soo
- Chris Mulkey as Angelo
- Bill Cobbs as Malachi
- Gabrielle Dennis as Leena
- Jonathan McDaniel as Zho
