= City of Lies =

2018 crime film directed by Brad Furman

- Theatrical release poster
- Directed by: Brad Furman
- Screenplay by: Christian Contreras
- Based on: LAbyrinth by Randall Sullivan
- Produced by: Miriam Segal; Paul Brennan; Stuart Manashil
- Starring: Johnny Depp; Forest Whitaker
- Cinematography: Monika Lenczewska
- Edited by: Leo Trombetta
- Music by: Chris Hajian
- Production companies: Good Films; Lipsync; Romulus Entertainment; FilmNation Entertainment; Miramax; Infinitum Nihil
- Distributed by: Saban Films
- Release dates: December 8, 2018 (Noir in Festival); March 19, 2021 (United States)
- Running time: 112 minutes
- Countries: United States; United Kingdom
- Language: English
- Box office: $2.8 million

City of Lies is a 2018 crime thriller film about the investigations by the Los Angeles Police Department of the murders of rappers Tupac Shakur and the Notorious B.I.G. It is directed by Brad Furman, with a screenplay by Christian Contreras based on the non-fiction book LAbyrinth by Randall Sullivan. The film stars Johnny Depp as retired LAPD detective Russell Poole and Forest Whitaker as journalist Jack Jackson, with Rockmond Dunbar and Neil Brown Jr. also starring.

The film premiered in Italy on December 8, 2018, screened out of competition on the last day of the Noir in Festival. It received a limited release in Italy on January 10, 2019. It was originally set to be released in the United States on September 7, 2018, by Global Road Entertainment, it was pulled from the schedule in August 2018 following the closure of Global Road Entertainment. It was eventually acquired by Saban Films and released on March 19, 2021, followed by a PVOD release on April 9, 2021. The film premiered in France on September 5, 2021 when it was screened out of competition at the Deauville American Film Festival where Depp was a guest of honor. The film received mixed reviews from critics.

== Plot ==
In 2015, Los Angeles Times investigative reporter Darius "Jack" Jackson is assigned to write about the murder of the Notorious B.I.G. (Christopher Wallace), and meets with the retired and disgraced Los Angeles Police Department (LAPD) detective Russell Poole. In a series of flashbacks, Poole reveals his theory that Death Row Records CEO Suge Knight paid corrupt LAPD officers to murder Wallace and cover it up.

In 1997, just weeks after the Wallace murder, Poole is tasked with investigating the shooting of off-duty black police officer Kevin Gaines by a white detective, Frank Lyga. Poole faces pressure from upper management in relation to the media frenzy involving other recent race-related incidents in Los Angeles, namely the beating of Rodney King and the murder trial of O. J. Simpson. During the course of the investigation, Poole learns that Gaines was on Knight's payroll and had Bloods gang affiliation. Poole's superior officer, Lieutenant O'Shea, refuses to give credence to this theory and orders Poole to close the Gaines-Lyga shooting. Lyga is exonerated but faces a civil suit, with the Gaines family being represented by attorney Johnnie Cochran. Poole confirms from an undercover FBI agent the connection between Knight and Gaines, and he is transferred to the Robbery-Homicide Division to investigate the Wallace murder.

Poole and his partner Fred Miller obtain the names of suspects including David Mack, another LAPD officer in Knight's employ, as well as Nation of Islam member Amir Muhammad and Blood member Wardell Fouse. Poole learns Mack worked security for Wallace and has also been recently tied to a bank robbery. Mack is arrested but does not give up any information related to Wallace's death. Poole begins investigating yet another LAPD officer, Rafael Pérez, after learning that he has been stealing cocaine from the evidence room. Poole tails Pérez and watches him shoot a drug dealer but Poole intervenes and shoots Pérez in self-defense. Pérez is criminally charged and implicates himself and other officers in various criminal activities. Poole is granted his own task force and also prepares to take the stand in Lyga's civil trial where he intends to claim, on the record, that Mack was involved in Wallace's death and that the LAPD is covering it up, but the city settles before the trial commences. Lyga is unable to clear his name and Poole is shunned by the LAPD.

Voletta Wallace files a wrongful death claim against Los Angeles based on the evidence championed by Poole. Mack and Amir Muhammad were named as defendants, but were dropped shortly before the trial began after the LAPD and FBI dismissed them as suspects. Poole resigns in disgrace one month before he was eligible for his pension, which ultimately costs him his family.

Jackson meets with Poole and Voletta who have developed a friendship in the decades since her son's murder. Jackson apologizes to her for previously writing an article implicating her son in the murder of Tupac Shakur; which she accepts. Voletta reveals that she is thankful for Poole's sacrifice in his attempts to solve the murder. Poole informs Jackson that Wallace's earning potential was estimated at $1 billion, and that a civil suit would bankrupt the city. One day, Poole goes to the L.A. Sheriff's Department in an attempt to reopen his investigation, but suffers a heart attack and dies some time after.

Out of guilt, Jackson, using the information he has learned, writes an article about Russell Poole declaring him as a forgotten hero. Jackson's article is received with acclaim, however, he soon resigns from his job, finding the system too hypocritical to celebrate worthy men like Poole. Both the murders of Wallace and Tupac remain unsolved.

== Cast ==
- Johnny Depp as Russell Poole, a retired LAPD detective.
- Forest Whitaker as Darius "Jack" Jackson, a journalist who teams with the cop to find the truth.
- Rockmond Dunbar as Dreadlocks
- Neil Brown Jr. as Rafael Pérez, a corrupt LAPD officer
- Xander Berkeley as Edwards
- Shea Whigham as Detective Frank Lyga
- Wynn Everett as Megan Poole, Russell's wife.
- Toby Huss as Detective Fred Miller, Poole's partner
- Louis Herthum as City Attorney Stone, a city attorney who defends Poole on trial.
- Shamier Anderson as David "D Mack" Mack, a corrupt LAPD officer.
- Amin Joseph as Kevin Gaines, a corrupt LAPD officer
- Laurence Mason as FBI Agent Dunton
- Joseph Ferrante as Detective Snow
- Dayton Callie as Lieutenant O'Shea
- Keith Szarabajka as Sergeant Reese
- Peter Greene as Commander Fasulo
- Marisol Sacramento as Errolyn Romero
- Michael Paré as Varney
- Glenn Plummer as Mike "Psycho Mike"
- Kevin Chapman as Sergeant Leeds
- Obba Babatundé as Chief of Police Bernard Parks
- Robert Henley Starr as EMT Robert McGinnis
- Rian Bishop as Officer Simpyak
- Rey Borge as Cashier
- Voletta Wallace as Herself, the Notorious B.I.G.'s mother
- Killer Mike as Arrested Man

== Production ==
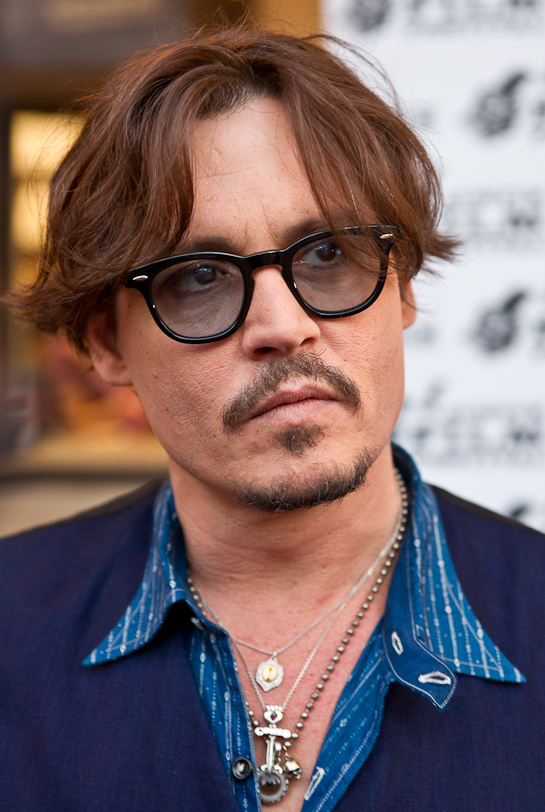
Depp plays former LAPD detective Russell Poole

On February 4, 2013, Miriam Segal's British production company Good Films was reported to have bought the film rights to Randall Sullivan's non-fiction book LAbyrinth. This explored police corruption in Los Angeles related to detective Russell Poole's investigation of the murders of Tupac Shakur and Biggie Smalls, which were never solved. On September 7, 2016, Johnny Depp was reportedly cast in the film to play Poole, the Los Angeles police detective.

Brad Furman was announced as director for the film, from a script written by Christian Contreras and adapted from the book. On September 19, Open Road Films acquired the film's US distribution rights. It co-financed the film along with Miramax, while Good Universe handled the film's international sales.

=== Casting ===
On November 11, 2016, Rockmond Dunbar was cast in the film to play Dreadlocks. The same day Forest Whitaker joined the film to play the journalist who teams up with the police officer to uncover the truth. On November 17, Neil Brown Jr. was cast in the film to play police officer Rafael Pérez. Xander Berkeley, Shea Whigham, Wynn Everett, and Toby Huss were cast in the film on December 13, while two days later Louis Herthum and Shamier Anderson also joined the film, with Herthum playing a city attorney who defends Poole on trial and Anderson playing corrupt LAPD officer David "D. Mack" Mack. On January 6, 2017, Amin Joseph joined the film to play police officer Kevin Gaines, and on January 18, Laurence Mason to play an FBI agent, Dunton. On January 23, 2017, newcomer Joseph Ferrante joined the film for an unspecified role.

=== Filming ===
Principal photography on the film began on December 13, 2016, in Los Angeles, California. Principal photography wrapped in May 2017.

== Release ==
The first trailer for the film, originally titled LAbyrinth, was released on May 21, 2018, which would have been the Notorious B.I.G.'s 46th birthday. Following the merger between Open Road Films and IM Global to form Global Road Entertainment, the film was retitled City of Lies and given a release date of September 7, 2018, the 22nd anniversary of the murder of Tupac Shakur. In August 2018, the film was pulled from the schedule, reportedly due to an ongoing lawsuit involving Depp and the film's location manager; no new release date was announced.

On August 23, 2018, the Daily Beast reported that Depp's legal trouble was used as a scapegoat. It suggested that the Los Angeles Police Department may have been trying to suppress the film, in which it is negatively portrayed, or that there were other major players who did not want the film released. In July 2020, Adam Tod Brown argued that the film was suppressed so Voletta Wallace cannot reopen the Notorious B.I.G. murder case to sue the LAPD. On August 29, 2018, Bank Leumi filed another lawsuit against Miramax over millions of dollars in unpaid guarantees caused by pulling the film from release.

City of Lies was first premiered in Italy when it was screened on December 9, 2018, out of competition, at the Noir in Festival as the closing film of the event. It received a limited release in Italy on January 10, 2019. The film was released on Blu-ray in Italy on June 19, 2019. On September 5, 2021, the film was presented for the first time in France when it was screened out of competition at the Deauville American Film Festival. Depp and Furman presented the film at the festival where Depp was a guest of honor.

On March 4, 2021, Saban Films announced that it had taken over the distribution rights, and scheduled the movie for release on March 19, 2021. In October 2021, Highland Film Group picked up international rights to the film for worldwide sales and marketing.

== Reception ==
=== Box office ===
In the United States and Canada, the film grossed $275,049 from 501 theaters in its opening weekend, a per-venue average of $549.

=== Downloads and rentals ===
On Redbox, the film debuted at #1 on the rental chart and #5 on the VOD chart for week ending June 13, 2021.

=== Critical response ===
On Rotten Tomatoes, the film holds an approval rating of 51% based on 49 reviews, with an average rating of 6/10. According to Metacritic, which calculated a weighted average score of 44 out of 100 based on 12 critics, the film received "mixed or average" reviews.

Richard Roeper of the Chicago Sun-Times gave the film 3 out of 4 stars, writing: "...in large part due to the stellar work from Depp and Whitaker, this is a valuable and somewhat illuminating look back at the senseless, stunning killings of two rap icons just six months apart." Writing for The Hollywood Reporter, John DeFore wrote: "This is a compelling drama with real-world concerns that shouldn't be ignored, and it deserves better than to be the victim of an actor's offscreen sins."

== See also ==
- List of hood films
