= LAPD: Life on the Beat =

American reality television series

- Genre: Reality
- Narrated by: Andrew Geller (1995–1996); Hank Brandt (1996–1999)
- Composer: Scooter Pietsch
- Country of origin: United States
- Original language: English
- No. of seasons: 4
- No. of episodes: 576

Production
- Executive producers: Dave Bell; Dennis Bogorad
- Running time: 30 minutes
- Production companies: QRZ Media; MGM/UA Telecommunications Group (1995–1997) (seasons 1–2); MGM Telecommunications Group (1997) (season 2); MGM Domestic Television Distribution (1997–1999) (seasons 3–4)

Original release
- Network: Syndication
- Release: September 11, 1995 – September 10, 1999

LAPD: Life on the Beat (sometimes referred to individually as LAPD or Life on the Beat) is an American reality television series that follows officers of the Los Angeles Police Department, as they respond to various incidents within their division's jurisdiction. The program aired in first-run syndication from September 11, 1995, to September 10, 1999. Like its contemporary, COPS, LAPD follows police officers on patrol and during investigations. Unlike COPS, Life on the Beat only features police officers from the Los Angeles Police Department (LAPD). The series was originally titled as simply LAPD for its first season in 1995, before adopting the expanded title in 1996, in conjunction with the introduction of an upgraded graphical look.

A typical episode featured four segments, a cold case story and usually a quiz relating to police statistics. Unlike COPS, Life on the Beat features incidental music and a narrator. At the time of the series, the LAPD still had only 18 stations, so camera crews would cover as many stations as possible and had episodes featuring multiple areas of Los Angeles. Episodes featured routine patrol, vice units, gang units, and even SWAT calls. Many segments also feature the Air Support Division. For a large amount of patrol-based segments, cameras flip back and forth between ground and aerial angles.

== Officers in the series ==
Throughout the series a large number of officers are seen repeatedly. Officers appearing on LAPD could also be found on TLC's Hollywood COPS and Discovery's On the Inside that featured mostly Pacific division. Four officers made a huge impact on the show and were seen over and over again; they were officers Jeff Alley, Derek O'Donnell and brothers Tim and Sean Colomey who all worked in South LA patrol divisions. These officers can also be seen on an MSNBC special report that focused on problems in South Central Los Angeles.

Officer Jeff Alley played a huge role in making sure that the TV crews always had a deeper understanding of what was really going on. He took the opportunity to educate those in TV land about police work with pros and cons of situations and allowed those with an interest in law enforcement to have a better understanding about the job.

In a couple episodes, Life on the Beat filmed with Hollywood Division Officers J.C. Flores and Jeri Snell, the two were assigned to the Domestic Violence Unit, Both Flores and Snell could also be seen on TLC's Hollywood COPS working the same detail. Hollywood patrol officers Ray Camuy and Joel Sydanmaa were also featured in several episodes of both Life on the Beat and Hollywood COPS.

On TLC's Women in Blue, Officer Monica Lobato is working CRASH in the Newton area. She can also be seen on an early episode of Life on the Beat working patrol in Newton.

Throughout the series, SWAT (Special Weapons and Tactics) is seen responding emergency calls and while raiding narcotics locations. From barricaded suspects to the North Hollywood shootout SWAT segments were seen throughout the show, one particular SWAT officer was Randal Simmons. He can be seen in episodes filmed from 1996 to 1998 on different call-ups. He was killed in February 2008 during a standoff in Winnetka and was LAPD's first SWAT fatality in 40 years of operation. Four days after the death of Officer Simmons, FOX Reality re-aired an episode featuring him and his SWAT unit. The network at the time was playing as many as three Life on the Beat re-runs per day. At the beginning and end of this particular episode, Fox decided to pay tribute with an End of Watch memorial graphic with Simmons's photograph.

Despite having many camera operators through the city and with access to SWAT, Air Support and other special details, Life on the Beat was not on scene with officers for both the North Hollywood Shootout and the North Valley Jewish Community Center shooting. In both cases, in the weeks and months leading up to these events Life on the Beat was filming with the same officers assigned to the same areas and shifts as those who would later respond to these events.

For the North Hollywood incident, special segments were filmed with exclusive interviews with those involved at the scene including all SWAT members, SWAT Officer Pete Weireter, who led efforts in rescuing downed officers and civilians, SWAT officer Don Anderson who led a team of three SWAT officers, including himself, Steve Gomez and Rich Massa, who together intercepted the gunman in the middle of a residential street by performing a vehicle assault takedown, killing him and ending the incident.

Traffic Officer Conrad Torrez is featured regarding his actions in engaging the first gunman with gunfire. He is the officer believed to have killed the first suspect while that suspect was believed to have also been trying to kill himself after his gun jammed. Other interviews were conducted with Sergeant Dean Haynes and others such as Tracy Angeles and James Zboravan. Officer Zboravan was filmed in the months leading up to the shootout working North Hollywood patrol as a probationary with only a couple months on the job from the academy.

== Withdrawal of the LAPD ==
Ultimately, after 576 episodes over a four-year run LAPD: Life on the Beat was not renewed by MGM for a fifth season.

== Similar programs ==
A couple years after Life on the Beat went off air, TLC aired a special about females in law enforcement titled Women In Blue. The show featured a female detective from Narcotics Division and two female officers in the Newton Division assigned to the anti-gang unit known as CRASH. Filmings were done in the summer of 2001.

In 1998–1999 TLC rode along with LAPD's Hollywood Division for several months, gathering footage for a mini-series titled "Hollywood COPS". The series was filmed for the BBC and originally aired in Europe, but it eventually aired in the United States. The series focused on Hollywood Division's Homicide Unit, narcotics officers Bob Deemer and Blair Grabiak, and patrol officers Ray Camuy and Joel Sydanmaa.

== Episode status ==
The series was later shown in reruns in the United States on cable television channels TNT from 2003 until 2004 and Fox Reality Channel from 2005 until 2010, and the digital multicast television networks Escape (now known as Ion Mystery) from 2015 until 2019, and Charge! from 2017 until 2018.

From 2011 until 2016, the show was available for streaming online on Hulu.

== Home media releases ==
In 1998, two videotapes of the series was released on VHS: Hottest Police Chases Live on Tape, focuses on the police chases from the show and War on the Streets: The North Hollywood Shootout focuses on the North Hollywood shootout.

== See also ==
- Cops
- Live PD
- Real Stories of the Highway Patrol
