= Nino Durden =

Former Los Angeles Police officer and convicted criminal (born 1963)

- Born: Gino Floyd Durden; May 5, 1963 (age 63); Los Angeles, California, United States
- Other name: Nino
- Police career
- Country: United States
- Allegiance: Los Angeles
- Department: Los Angeles Police Department
- Service years: 1989–2000
- Rank: Sworn in as an officer – 1989
- Other work: Convicted in connection to the LAPD Rampart scandal

Gino Floyd "Nino" Durden (born May 5, 1963) is a former American police officer in the Los Angeles Police Department Community Resources Against Street Hoodlums (CRASH) unit implicated in the LAPD Rampart scandal. Durden, along with Officer Rafael Pérez, was involved in the shooting and framing of gang member Javier Ovando. Both officers later made false statements against Ovando in court.

== Arrest and charges ==
Durden was arrested on July 28, 2000 by LAPD internal affairs division officers. According to media reports, like the other officers directly involved, Durden was booked wearing his LAPD uniform.

Durden was charged with attempted murder, assault with a semiautomatic firearm in the Ovando shooting, filing a false report and perjury – two counts stemming from the October 25, 1996, arrest of Miguel Hernandez, who was allegedly framed on a weapons offense, second-degree robbery for allegedly stealing jewelry and money from a suspected drug dealer on August 15, 1997, and filing a false report in connection with the February 2, 1997, arrest of Jose Lara, who also was allegedly framed on a weapons charge.

Durden pleaded guilty to all charges and was sentenced to five years in prison on six California state charges, including perjury, filing false police reports and conspiracy to obstruct justice, on August 6, 2002. The sentence was served concurrently with a three-year sentence for federal charges of civil rights violations and possession of an illegal firearm. He was released on April 22, 2005, and placed on parole.

== Media ==
Throughout the timeline of the incidents reported in the Rampart investigation, Durden was working in the LAPD's South Bureau (South Los Angeles) and had worked there since 1997, after the arrest of fellow LAPD officer Rafael Pérez. He was featured in several episodes of the FOX series LAPD: Life On the Beat before his involvement in the scandal became known.
