= David Mack (police officer) =

American runner and police officer convicted for bank robbery

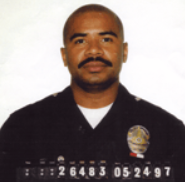
- Born: David Anthony Mack; May 30, 1961 (age 65); Compton, California, U.S.
- Other name: D. Mack
- Known for: Convicted in connection with the Rampart police corruption scandal
- Sports career
- Country: United States
- Sport: Track and Field
- Event: 800 meters
- University team: Oregon Ducks
- Club: Santa Monica Track Club

Sports achievements and titles
- Personal bests: Outdoor; 600 m: 1:14.15 (Santa Monica 1986); 800 m: 1:43.35 (Koblenz 1985); 1000 m: 2:16.90 (Edinburgh 1985); Indoor; 1000 m: 2:21.43i (East Rutherford 1983)
- Police career
- Country: United States
- Allegiance: Los Angeles
- Department: Los Angeles Police Department
- Service years: 1988–1997
- Rank: Sworn in as an officer – 1988; Police Officer II; Police Officer III; Senior Lead Officer
- Awards: LAPD Medal for Heroism

David Anthony Mack (born May 30, 1961) is an American former professional runner and Los Angeles Police Department (LAPD) officer involved in the Rampart Division's Community Resources Against Street Hoodlums (CRASH) unit. He was one of the central figures in the LAPD Rampart police corruption scandal. Mack was arrested in December 1997 for robbery of $722,000 from a South Central Los Angeles branch of the Bank of America. He was sentenced to fourteen years and three months in federal prison. Mack has never revealed the whereabouts of the money.

== Early life ==
As an athlete, David Mack ran track for Locke High School and was champion at the CIF California State Meet at 880 yards for two years in a row.

He attended the University of Oregon where he ran track with his high school rival Jeff West. After West transferred to UCLA, Mack considered following suit, but was convinced to stay at UO by coach Bill Dellinger. While in college, Mack dated the world record holder in the 100 m and 200 m, Flo Jo. In 1980, as a freshman in college, he finished sixth in the Olympic Trials. Mack won three Pac-10 conference titles in the 800 and in his junior year, the NCAA Division I Championship in the 800 meters.

As a professional, Mack ran for Santa Monica Track Club. He qualified for the United States national team, running the 800 metres in the 1983 World Championships in Athletics but failed to advance to the final. He was the rabbit in Sydney Maree's 1500 meter world record and one week later rabbited Steve Ovett to surpass that record. A stress fracture in his shin caused him to fail to make it out of the heats at the 1984 USATF Championships. In 1985 he ran 1:43.35 seconds which at the time was the second fastest time ever by an American and still ranks 9th fastest. He failed to advance from the heats in the 800m at the 1987 World Championships in Athletics. Beset by fatigue from iron deficiency, his last professional race was in 1988.

== Bank robbery ==
In August 1997, Mack's lover, Errolyn Romero, became employed at a Bank of America branch near the University of Southern California campus. On November 6, 1997, Mack entered the bank and claimed he wanted to access his safe deposit box. Romero admitted him to the secure area, where he threw her to the floor and robbed the vault of $722,000.

In her capacity as branch assistant manager, Romero had ordered double the usual amount of cash to be on hand at the bank on the day of the robbery. After one month of investigation, Romero confessed to her role in the crime and implicated Mack as the mastermind. He was arrested in December 1997. His two accomplices were never caught.

Mack was sentenced to fourteen years and three months in prison and has never revealed the whereabouts of the money. He was released on May 14, 2010.

According to the Tupac documentary Assassination: Battle for Compton, citing official legal documents, a reliable jail informant by the name of Ken Boagni, who befriended Rafael Perez in prison, stated Perez claimed the money stolen in the bank robbery was intended to go to Harry Billups, also known as Amir Muhammed, who was friends with Mack, for allegedly carrying out the murder of late rapper Christopher Wallace, also known as Biggie Smalls. Because Billups failed to also murder Sean Combs, the second intended target, Billups was not paid in full by his contractors, who are identified as Reggie Wright Jr. and David Kenner. Boagni claimed both Perez and Mack were involved in the murder of Wallace, but Billups was the shooter.

== Relation to the murder of The Notorious B.I.G. ==
In his 2002 book LAbyrinth, Randall Sullivan, making an assertion based on evidence provided by former LAPD detective Russell Poole, accused music producer Marion "Suge" Knight of collaborating with Mack and a hitman Mack was associated with who was identified as Amir Muhammad to murder Christopher Wallace, a rapper who performed under the name The Notorious B.I.G. In April 2002, Voletta Wallace, the mother of Christopher Wallace, filed a wrongful death claim against the city of Los Angeles based on the evidence championed by Poole and Sullivan.

In April 2007, Voletta Wallace and other members of the Christopher Wallace estate filed a wrongful death lawsuit against the City of Los Angeles, which also named Mack, Pérez, and Nino Durden as defendants. The lawsuit alleged that the officers conspired to murder Wallace, and that Pérez and Mack were present the night of the drive-by shooting which killed him on March 9, 1997. In 2010, a federal judge dismissed the lawsuit against the city and the officers.

== Depictions in media ==
In the biography film City of Lies, David Mack is played by Shamier Anderson. The film features the 1997 bank robbery.

Omar Gooding depicted Mack in the television series Unsolved.
