= Kevin Gaines (police officer) =

American police officer (1966–1997)

- Born: Kevin Lee Gaines; February 6, 1966; Los Angeles, California, U.S.
- Died: March 18, 1997 (aged 31); Studio City, California, U.S.
- Known for: Rampart scandal involvement
- Affiliations: Bloods; Death Row Records
- Police career
- Country: United States
- Allegiance: Los Angeles
- Department: Los Angeles Police Department
- Service years: 1990–1997
- Rank: Sworn in as an officer – 1990

Kevin Lee Gaines (February 6, 1966 – March 18, 1997) was an American police officer assigned to the Los Angeles Police Department (LAPD) Community Resources Against Street Hoodlums (CRASH) unit implicated in the Rampart scandal.

Gaines had ties to Death Row Records and the Bloods, and dated Suge Knight's ex-wife. He was shot and killed on March 18, 1997 by undercover LAPD detective Frank Lyga, who was determined to be acting in self-defense. At the time of his death, Gaines was 31, and a seven-year veteran of the force. The shooting of a black officer by a white officer fueled racial tensions and prompted a media frenzy. The investigation into Gaines's behavior also provided the first clues to the widespread police corruption of the Rampart scandal.

== Evidence of corruption ==
Evidence of Gaines's corrupt behavior first surfaced in the summer of 1996. Police responded to a 911 call reporting a shooting at a Hollywood Hills mansion. Gaines, off duty, arrived at the scene and is alleged to have initiated an altercation with the responding officers. The officers handcuffed Gaines when he became verbally abusive and provocative. According to police records, Gaines shouted profanities and stated, "I hate fucking cops."

Gaines claimed he was mistreated by the police and hired an attorney to file a claim against the city. However, when LAPD Internal Affairs investigated the incident, they discovered the 911 call had actually been made by Gaines himself. Investigating officer Russell Poole, who later became deeply involved in investigating the Rampart Scandal, claimed that "the evidence suggests that he did that to engage LAPD in a confrontation and basically wanted to secure a pension or whatever by filing a lawsuit."

== Death ==
Around 4:00 p.m. on March 18, 1997, undercover LAPD narcotics detective Frank Lyga shot and killed Kevin Gaines in what he claimed to be an act of self-defense, following a case of apparent road rage. According to Lyga and other witnesses' testimonies, Gaines pulled his green Mitsubishi Montero SUV up to Lyga's Buick Regal at a traffic light. A verbal confrontation ensued, with Gaines flashing what Lyga believed to be gang signs with his hands. During this argument, Gaines told Lyga he would "put a cap up your ass". Lyga was aware that "cap" was a slang term for shooting someone, causing him to believe that Gaines had a gun and intended to use it. Both vehicles drove off from the traffic light, with Gaines following Lyga southbound on Cahuenga Boulevard at high speed, even swerving into oncoming traffic briefly to continue the chase.

Lyga stopped at a red light at Regal Place, where he observed Gaines's Montero coming towards him. Lyga unholstered his Beretta 92 and held it on his lap, then called for backup using a hidden police radio activated by a foot pedal. Recordings of his radio transmissions captured Lyga saying, "I've got a problem. There's a black guy in a green Jeep on my ass! I need you guys," followed shortly after by, "I think he's got a gun." Gaines pulled up next to Lyga, who later testified that he heard Gaines shout, "I'll cap you, motherfucker!" Gaines brandished a .45 ACP handgun, and Lyga fired at him twice, lodging one bullet in Gaines's heart. Lyga radioed one final transmission: "I just shot somebody! I need help!"

Lyga served desk duty for one year while the LAPD reviewed the details of the shooting. Following three separate internal investigations, Lyga was exonerated of any wrongdoing. The LAPD concluded that Lyga's shooting was "in policy" and not racially or improperly motivated. Within three days of the incident, the Gaines family retained attorney Johnnie Cochran and filed a wrongful death lawsuit against the city of Los Angeles for US$25 million. The city eventually settled with Cochran for US$250,000. Lyga was angry the city settled, denying him the chance to fully clear his name. Judge Schoettler wrote a letter to Chief Bernard Parks stating, "Had the matter been submitted to me for a determination, I would have found in favor of the City of Los Angeles." Schoettler's letter alleged political reasons for settling the case, namely, City Attorney James Hahn was preparing to run for mayor and black voters were his primary demographic.

== Depictions in media ==
- In Episode 1 of the Unsolved series, the 1997 road rage incident is featured, in which Kevin Gaines is played by Mustafa Speaks and Frank Lyga is played by P.J. Marshal.
- In the biography film City of Lies, Kevin Gaines is played by Amin Joseph. The film features the 1997 road rage incident with Frank Lyga, played by Shea Whigham.

== See also ==
- List of homicides in California
