= Amin Joseph =

American actor, director and producer (born 1980)

- Joseph in 2026
- Born: April 26, 1980 (age 46); Queens, New York City, U.S.
- Education: Howard University
- Occupations: Actor; producer; director
- Years active: 2004–present
- Website: aminjoseph.com

Amin Joseph (born April 26, 1980) is an American actor, director, and producer known for his role as Jerome Saint on John Singleton's crime drama Snowfall.

== Early life ==
Joseph was born in Queens, New York City, and was raised in Harlem, New York City. His father is Antiguan, and his mother is from South Carolina. Joseph is a graduate of Rice High School and Howard University. He is a protégé of the Apollo Theater in his hometown Harlem, where he interned during his youth. In 2004, he made his movie debut in the Sean Baker and Shih-Ching Tsou co-directed feature film drama Take Out.

== Career ==
After making his film debut, his career continued with roles in independent movies, making his television debut in 2007 in the crime drama series The Shield, and his short film debut in 2007 in Jack Robert's The Wall. In 2007, he appeared as an M.P. in Frank Darabont's science fiction horror film The Mist. He also played the role of a pirate leader in the 2010 action film The Expendables.

Joseph had the lead role in the 2013 Cinemax late night series Zane's The Jump Off, in which he played Dmitri Vance. Joseph went on to play the role of Frankie in the 2017 comedy Baywatch, and the role of Kevin Gaines in the 2018 crime film City of Lies.

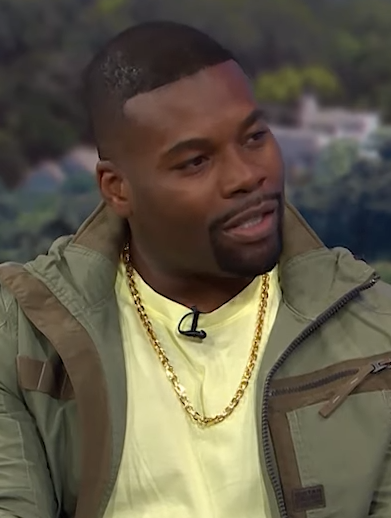
Joseph in 2019

In 2017, Joseph joined the cast of the FX crime drama Snowfall, playing Jerome Saint, the uncle of Franklin Saint and brother of Cissy Saint. He played the role until the show's conclusion in 2023.

== Production company ==
His production company, Dark Energy Pictures, specializes in action, horror, and sci-fi content spanning digital, television, and feature films. The company's film Call Me King, an international action thriller, embodies their focus on multicultural, lingual, and ethnic content.

== Charity work ==
His charitable work includes time with the grassroots organization The Awareness Movement in Los Angeles. The organization focuses on creating content in order to facilitate a positive dialogue between local communities and law enforcement, as well as giving a voice to disenfranchised voters in urban communities. He also volunteers with several schools throughout Los Angeles, providing scene study classes with a focus on African American classic playwrights.

== Personal life ==
He resides in Los Angeles.

== Filmography ==
=== Film ===
Year	Title	Role	Notes
2004	Take Out	Roommate	
2004	107 Street	Mark	
2004	Rage and Discipline	Bernard	
2005	Nightmare		
2007	Rapturious	Sloop	
2007	The Mist	M.P.	Also stunt performer
2008	House Arrest	Edward	Video
2008	Jada	Ross	
2009	The Bed	Detective #2	
2010	The Expendables	Pirate Leader	
2010	Titanic II	Kevin Lilac	Video
2010	Dirty South	Jerome	
2012	Starlet	Shadow	
2012	Freelancers	Shady Guy #2	
2012	The Son of an Afghan Farmer	Officer #2	
2013	G.I. Joe: Retaliation	Cobra Secret Service	
2013	Love and Football	Charles Miles	
2013	Homefront	Lead DEA Agent	
2013	Best Night Ever	Marcus	
2014	American Weapon	Deshaun	
2014	Time Lapse	Big Joe	
2014	The Gambler	Neville's Bookkeeper	
2015	My Favorite Five	Jamison	
2015	Dope	The Voice	
2015	Superfast	Dre	
2015	Sister Code	Thomas	
2015	No Way Out	Frank	
2015	Beautiful Destroyer	Brock	
2015	Turning Home	Ronnie	
2015	Call Me King	Rhyis	
2016	9 Rides	Friend	
2016	36 Hour Layover	Roman	
2017	Non-Transferable	Michael	
2017	Message from a Mistress	Kingston Livewell	
2017	Baywatch	Frankie	
2017	Fight Your Way Out	Gaslamp Bishop	
2018	The After Party	Leon	
2018	Shiner	Owen Tremaine	
2018	City of Lies	Kevin Gaines	
2019	Stuber	Leon	
2019	Professor Mack	Stephen	
2020	Angie: Lost Girls	Ivan	
2021	A Holiday Chance	Marcus	
2022	The Royal	Willie Mays Aikens	
2023	To Live and Die and Live	Muhammad Abdullah	
2024	The Other, Gold	Gerald Henry	
2025	One of Them Days	King Lolo	
TBA	Geechee	TBA	

=== Television ===
Year	Title	Role	Notes
2007	The Shield	Billy	Episode: "Chasing Ghosts"
2007	Shark	Kevin Barlow	Episode: "In the Crosshairs"
2008	Women's Murder Club	Leon Perker	Episode: "And the Truth Will (Sometimes) Set You Free"
2008	CSI: Miami	Security Guard	Episode: "Tipping Point"
2008–2010	Zane's Sex Chronicles	Taariq	Main cast
2009	NCIS	Campbell	Episode: "Knockout"
2011	Lbs	Dr. Hip Hop	Episode: "I Be Strokin"
2011	The Protector	Cake Gibson	Episode: "Ghosts"
2012	Awkward Black Girl	Jamiroquai	Episode: "The Decision"
2012	Major Crimes	Paramedic #1	Episode: "Before and After"
2012	Sons of Anarchy	Raymun	Episode: "Authority Vested"
2012	Operation Cupcake	Cop	TV movie
2013	Southland	Dewain	Episode: "Heat"
2013	Mob City	Skeety	Episodes: "His Banana Majesty" & "Oxpecker"
2013	Zane's The Jump Off	Dmitri Vance	Main cast
2014	The Rebels	Football Player	Episode: "Pilot"
2014	Transparent	Mike	Recurring cast: season 1
2015	Donny!	Jason	Recurring cast
2015	Stock Option	Marvelous	TV movie
2017	Shooter	Martin Jacobs	Episode: "That'll Be the Day"
2017	S.W.A.T.	Trick	Episode: "Homecoming"
2017–2023	Snowfall	Jerome Saint	Main cast
2018	Black Card Revoked	Himself	Episode: "Loni Love, CP Powell, Amin Joseph"
2018	Unsolved	Percy Locke	Episode: "Tupac Amaru Shakur" & "Christopher"
2019	Tales	David	Episode: "Ex-Factor"
2021	We Stay Looking	Lenny Walker	Episode: "Enjoy Prison, N*gga"
2022	Send Help	Sebastian 'Simp' Gauyo	Main cast
2023	Justified: City Primeval	Jamal	Episode: "City Primeval"
2023	Tacoma FD	Macintosh Jones	Episode: "Who Gives A-Shift?"
TBA	The Greatest	Sonny Liston	Main cast
