= Rafael Pérez (police officer) =

Former Los Angeles Police officer and convicted criminal (born 1967)

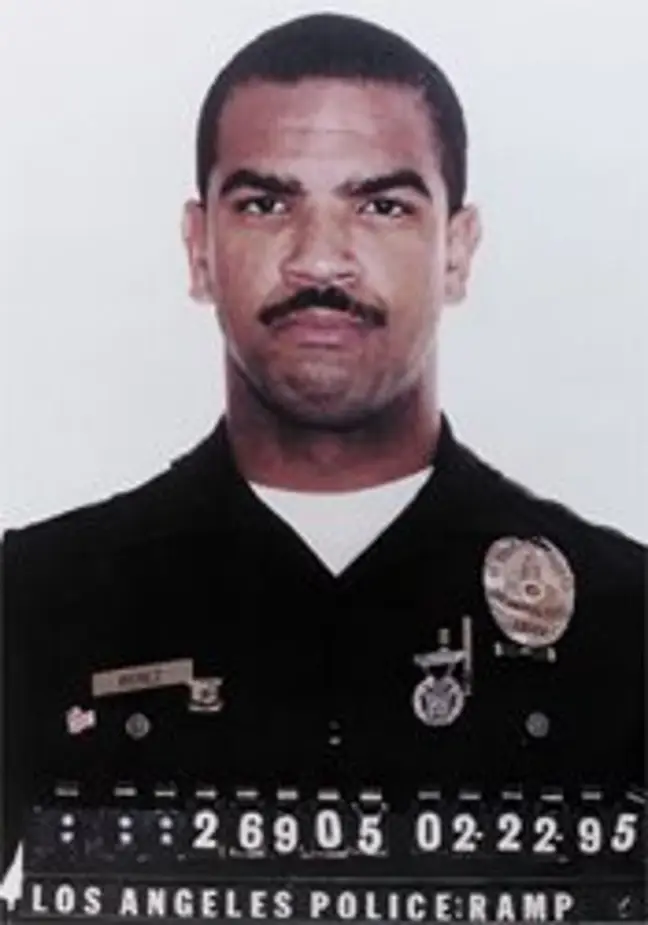
- Mug shot of Pérez
- Born: Rafael Antonio Pérez; August 22, 1967 (age 59); Humacao, Puerto Rico
- Other name: Ray Lopez
- Spouse(s): Lorri Charles (1985–1993); Denise Aubry (1993–2006)
- Police career
- Allegiance: Los Angeles
- Department: Los Angeles Police Department
- Service years: 1989–1998
- Rank: Sworn in as an officer (1989); Police Officer II; Police Officer III (1994)
- Other work: Convicted in connection to the LAPD Rampart Scandal (plea bargain), government witness
- Military career
- Allegiance: United States
- Branch: United States Marine Corps
- Service years: 1985–1989

Ray Lopez (born Rafael Antonio Pérez; August 22, 1967) is an American former police officer with the Los Angeles Police Department (LAPD) and the central figure in the LAPD Rampart scandal. An officer with the Community Resources Against Street Hoodlums (CRASH) task force, Pérez was involved in numerous crimes and corruption, notably the shooting and framing of Javier Ovando, in addition to the theft and resale of at least $800,000 of cocaine from LAPD evidence lockers.

Pérez is accused of being a member of the Bloods, a Los Angeles criminal gang, and of murdering The Notorious B.I.G. at the behest of producer Suge Knight of Death Row Records. When Pérez was finally arrested, he implicated 70 other Rampart Division officers in various forms of misconduct, ranging from bad shootings to consuming alcohol while on duty. Over 100 convictions were overturned based on Pérez's testimony.

== Personal life ==
Pérez was born in Humacao, Puerto Rico in 1967 and moved to Brooklyn, New York in 1972; some months later he moved to Paterson, New Jersey, and then he would eventually move to Philadelphia, Pennsylvania in 1982.

Pérez graduated from high school in 1985 and enlisted in the United States Marine Corps, went to boot camp at Marine Corps Recruit Depot Parris Island in South Carolina. He was stationed in Maine and California. He was hired by the LAPD after finishing his military service in 1989. Prior to this, he had been passed over for hiring by background investigators from several other departments in Southern California. He also looked and acted in a "gang like" manner.

== Career ==
After serving on routine patrol duties, Pérez was transferred to a narcotics unit in 1992. In 1995, he was transferred to Rampart Division and assigned to CRASH, an anti-gang unit given a long leash by the LAPD. Pérez gained a reputation as a tough and effective officer, valued for his fluency in Spanish and his knowledge of L.A.'s gangs.

=== Criminal activities ===
On October 12, 1996, Pérez and his partner Nino Durden shot and framed an unarmed gang member Javier Ovando. Ovando, who was left paralyzed, was sentenced to 23 years in prison based on the officers' false testimony.

On November 6, 1997, fellow CRASH officer David Mack and two accomplices stole $722,000 during a robbery at a Bank of America branch near the University of Southern California campus.

On August 25, 1998, Pérez, then age 31 and a nine-year veteran of the Los Angeles Police Department, was arrested for stealing six pounds (2.7 kg) of cocaine from a department property room (the theft was originally suspected to be an attempt at framing fellow officer Frank Lyga in retaliation for the shooting of Pérez's friend, Kevin Gaines). The cocaine was estimated to be worth $800,000 on the street. His December 1998 trial ended as a mistrial. To avoid a second trial and the possible conviction of his second wife, who according to authorities may have known about Pérez's illegal activities, on September 8, 1999, he cut a plea bargain with authorities. In his plea bargain he revealed the Rampart scandal in exchange for immunity for his misconduct.

== Criminal charges ==
=== February 2000 ===
In February 2000, Pérez was sentenced to five years in prison for stealing eight pounds of cocaine from an LAPD evidence locker. At his sentencing, Pérez read a statement in which he said, "I cheated on my wife. I cheated on my employer, and I cheated on all of you, the people of Los Angeles".

=== July 24, 2001 release ===
On July 24, 2001, due to his plea bargain Pérez was released from prison and placed on parole.

=== December 17, 2001 – Federal charges ===
Pérez pleaded guilty to new charges resulting from the shooting of Javier Ovando. He was charged with 2 felony counts; (1) conspiracy to violate Ovando's civil rights; (2) Possessing a firearm with an eliminated serial number, the firearm was used as evidence to frame Ovando. He was sentenced on May 6, 2002, to serve two years in federal prison. He was released in June 2004.

=== October 31, 2006 felony count ===
Pérez, who legally changed his name to Ray Lopez, was arrested in July by Department of Motor Vehicles investigators while visiting his federal parole officer in Inglewood. Pérez pleaded no contest to lying on his application for a California driver's license on June 30, 2005. Pérez was sentenced to an additional three years' probation and 300 hours of community service.

== Questions about credibility ==
The credibility of Pérez has been undermined by his testimony in several internal affairs investigations in which three officers, including Brian Liddy, were accused of crimes or misconduct, only to subsequently be found not guilty or have the charges against them dropped. Pérez also failed several polygraph tests and made numerous errors during past testimony. The issue of Pérez's credibility has already led to at least 5 cases in which charges were either dropped or the defendant was acquitted.

== Allegations of involvement in the murder of The Notorious B.I.G. ==
In March 1997, rapper Christopher "The Notorious B.I.G." Wallace was murdered in a drive-by shooting in Los Angeles.

On April 16, 2007, Wallace's relatives filed a wrongful death lawsuit against the city of Los Angeles, Pérez, and his former partner Nino Durden, seeking unspecified general, compensatory and punitive monetary damages. The lawsuit was filed in the Los Angeles Superior Court by Wallace's mother Voletta, his widow Faith Evans, and his two children, CJ and T'yanna.

The lawsuit states that Pérez, Durden, their partner David Mack, and "certain unknown persons" were responsible for Wallace's death. The rapper was shot to death on March 9, 1997, as he and Sean Combs left the 11th Annual Soul Train Music Awards after-party held at the Petersen Automotive Museum on Wilshire Boulevard in Los Angeles. The lawsuit states the killing was committed "in a very efficient, organized and professional manner, suggesting that a high degree of coordination and planning preceded his murder." The wrongful death lawsuit states that Pérez was a member of a violent street gang associated with Death Row Records, and that he was partly responsible for Wallace's death. The suit further alleges that Pérez admitted to the LAPD that he and Mack "conspired to murder, and participated in the murder of Christopher Wallace." It was alleged that Pérez was on duty during the night of March 9, 1997 but there was no evidence of that allegation.

In 2000 and 2001, Kenneth Boagni, an incarcerated informant who had been housed with Pérez, told LAPD investigators that Pérez had described working security for Death Row Records at the Petersen Automotive Museum on the night of Wallace’s murder. Boagni alleged that Pérez and former officer David Mack were connected to the events surrounding the killing and that Pérez had described communications with Mack and the involvement of other individuals. These allegations became part of the evidence in the Wallace family’s 2005 wrongful-death trial. The trial ended in a mistrial after U.S. District Judge Florence-Marie Cooper found that the LAPD had improperly withheld documents concerning Boagni’s statements. However, the judge did not determine that Pérez had participated in the murder or not. During the trial, none of the nine witnesses who testified conclusively placed Pérez or Mack at the crime scene or linked them to Death Row Records, however one witness back in 2005 regarding this lawsuit confirmed that David “D. Mack” Mack was at the Peterson the night of Biggie’s murder. Boagni’s credibility was also challenged because he had changed aspects of his account. In 2014, another incarcerated informant, Waymond Anderson, claimed in a deposition that Boagni had participated in a scheme to fabricate allegations against Pérez and Mack; Anderson’s own statements about the case had also changed over time.Rosenzweig, David (June 28, 2005). "Rogue Officer Named in Trial". Los Angeles Times.Blankstein, Andrew (July 8, 2005). "LAPD Hid Claims, Judge Says". Los Angeles Times.Landsberg, Mitchell (September 16, 2014). "Inmate recants story about LAPD link to rapper's slaying". Los Angeles Times.

Wallace's murder is believed to have been in retaliation for the murder of rapper Tupac Shakur. Shakur was signed to Death Row Records, run by Suge Knight. Knight is known to have hired off-duty Rampart police officers for security such as Kevin Gaines, who was shot to death by fellow LAPD officer Frank Lyga on March 18, 1997. Knight, who grew up in Compton, California, is well known for his ties to the Bloods. Following his arrest, detectives found several photos of Pérez flashing Blood gang signs. The connection between Pérez and the murder of Wallace has long been a source of speculation by the LAPD.

== In popular culture ==
- The character of Frank Tenpenny, the main antagonist of the 2004 video game Grand Theft Auto: San Andreas "strongly resembles" and is based on Perez.
- In the 2001 film Training Day, Denzel Washington said he emulated the style of Rafael Pérez to give authenticity to his portrayal of corrupt LAPD cop Alonzo Harris. The character's vehicle has the license plate ORP 967, which is said to stand for Officer Rafael Pérez, born in 1967.
- The television series The Shield is based on the Los Angeles Rampart scandal, and the show's main character, Officer Vic Mackey, is based loosely on Rafael Pérez.
- The TV series Mugshots , a crime documentary show from Court TV (now TruTV) released Rafael Perez - LAPD's Notorious Cop that showcased Pérez's criminal actions.
- Pérez is portrayed by Neil Brown Jr. in the 2018 film City of Lies, based on the Rampart scandal and the CRASH officer's alleged involvement in the murder of Biggie Smalls.
