= Frank Lyga =

American police officer (born 1957)

- Born: 1957 (age 68–69); Herkimer County, New York, United States
- Police career
- Country: United States
- Allegiance: Los Angeles
- Department: Los Angeles Police Department
- Service years: 1986–2014
- Rank: Sworn in as an Officer – 1986; Detective I (1990)

Frank Lyga (born c. 1957) is an American former police officer of the Los Angeles Police Department, who shot and killed Kevin Gaines. The resulting LAPD investigation of the shooting led to the police uncovering the wider Rampart scandal.

== Early career ==
In 1986, Lyga joined the Los Angeles Police Department after serving with a sheriff's department in the Mohawk Valley of New York.

== Kevin Gaines shooting ==
Kevin Gaines was shot and killed on March 18, 1997, by Lyga, who was ultimately determined to have been acting in self-defense. At the time of his death, Gaines was 31 and had been a member of the Los Angeles Police Department for seven years. Gaines had ties to Death Row Records and the Bloods and was living with Suge Knight's ex-wife.

Lyga, assigned to the Narcotics Division Clandestine Lab Squad at the time, along other members of his team was staking out a suspected methamphetamine dealer. Lyga was the point man, which required him to sit in an unmarked 1991 Buick Regal waiting for a drug deal to happen, so that he could follow the suspects back to their source and make the necessary arrests.

The operation was called off, and Lyga drove onto Ventura Boulevard. While he was stopped at a red light, a green sports utility vehicle driven by Gaines pulled up next to him; Gaines threatened Lyga. In response Lyga told Gaines to pull over for a confrontation. Gaines did pull over, but Lyga drove off; Gaines chased him, with the S.U.V. edging through heavy traffic until it neared Lyga's car. A concerned Lyga radioed his partners for help and readied himself to use his own gun. He saw Gaines had a gun and had threatened Lyga again. Lyga fired two shots at Gaines; the first missed, but the second hit the driver just below his right armpit, puncturing his heart before stopping in his lung. Gaines then pulled into a gas station and stopped. Lyga pulled into the gas station and identified himself as a police officer and asked a customer coming out of the station's mini-mart to call the 911 emergency number.

Soon a California Highway Patrol unit arrived, followed by Lyga's captain and the others on his stakeout team. The other officers took control of the scene using standard procedure. When Lyga returned to the station and awaited instructions on the investigation of the shooting he was informed by his commander, Dennis Zuener, that Kevin Gaines was a Los Angeles Police Officer.

=== Aftermath of the shooting ===
The day after the shooting a media frenzy followed. A group of African-Americans, led by Gaines's former partners Derwin Henderson and Bruce Stallworth, went to the scene of the incident and began conducting an unofficial investigation. That conduct intimidated known witnesses. Three days after the shooting, Johnnie Cochran Jr. stepped into the case, having been hired by Gaines's family to investigate a potential claim against Lyga and the city. Cochran later filed a twenty-five-million-dollar claim against the city, charging that Lyga was "an aggressive and dangerous police officer" who had failed to summon immediate medical assistance for Gaines, contributing to his death, and that he had conspired to "hide and distort the true facts concerning the incident".

The Los Angeles Police Department also announced Lyga's job performance would be examined. On Lyga's second day back on his job, he was assigned to a desk by the narcotics-division commander, and was told that he had 40 questionable use-of-force incidents filed, however he had been exonerated in four cases of using unnecessary force, or the cases were classified as unfounded or unresolved. He was also tested for signs of racial bias for every use-of-force incident by a demographic examination; no signs of racial bias by Lyga were found.

District Attorney Gil Garcetti opened a criminal investigation into the shooting. Witnesses to various moments of the event confirmed Lyga's account, as did a surveillance camera at the mini-mart, which recorded the sound of Lyga firing two shots 1.8 seconds apart. The District Attorney's inquiry eventually ruled that Lyga was not criminally liable. Three months after the incident, the LAPD unit investigating the shooting found that Lyga had acted according to department policy, and the department's shooting board recommended no disciplinary action.

The ruling, however, was postponed pending results of a three-dimensional digital re-creation of the shooting. In November, 1997, Lyga appeared again before the shooting board, which reviewed the evidence and the 3D re-creation, and in December LAPD chief Bernard C. Parks reported that the shooting was within department policy; no action would be taken against Lyga.

Even though the re-creation of the shooting supported Lyga's story, the city and Cochran agreed to a settlement conference the following October, mediated by retired Judge R. William Schoettler, Cochran had reduced his claim for 25 million dollars to $800,000 and then to $250,000, which the city agreed to. Judge Schoettler later wrote a letter to Parks telling him that he thought the settlement was "political"; had the case gone to trial, he believed, Lyga and the city would have won.

== Stolen evidence ==
Within months of being cleared, Lyga found himself under investigation again. On March 27, 1998, one pound (0.45 kg) of cocaine evidence booked from one of Lyga's previous arrests was found missing from the Parker Center property room.

=== Rafael Perez ===
Investigators eventually learned that the missing cocaine had been stolen by Rafael Perez, whom they suspected, at the time, of targeting Lyga in retaliation for the shooting of Gaines. The arrest of Perez, along with Gaines's death would cause investigations that would lead to the Rampart Scandal.

== Suspension and termination ==
On June 26, 2014, Detective Frank Lyga was placed on paid administrative leave after a pending investigation into allegations he made racist comments calling attorney Carl E. Douglas an "Ewok from the Star Wars movies". The comment was made after a training lecture given to other officers, during a question-answer section with officers asking for information relating to the 1997 shooting and aftermath.

Lyga was recorded on November 15, 2013, after an in-service training class at the Los Angeles Police Academy. Detective Lyga told the class that he didn't have any regrets shooting Gaines; in fact, he wished there were more of "them" in the car at the time. He stated that he could have killed a truckload of "them" and not felt anything and would be happy doing it.

In the recording, he called a female captain a "very cute little Hispanic lady who couldn't find her ass with both of her hands". In 1998, the woman had been a detective assigned to investigate the disappearance of Lyga's personnel file. He also said of the woman, "I heard she's been swapped around a bunch of times." He also called a lieutenant a "fucking moron" and another officer a "fruit".

In October 2014, the LAPD Board of Rights recommended that Lyga be terminated. He retired prior to being fired by LAPD Chief Charlie Beck.

In August 2016, the City of Los Angeles agreed to pay Lyga $50,000 for wrongful termination. However, the city admitted no wrongdoing and Lyga was not offered his job back as a part of the settlement.

== Depictions in media ==
Frank Lyga is played by Shea Whigham in the biography film City of Lies, which features the 1997 road rage incident with LAPD officer Kevin Gaines. It also features the missing cocaine stolen by LAPD officer Rafael Pérez in order to frame Lyga for the killing of Officer Kevin Gaines.
