= Javier Ovando =

Honduran victim of police brutality in the United States

Javier Francisco Ovando (born c.1977) is a Honduran man who became a central figure in the LAPD Rampart scandal when he was shot and framed by corrupt Rampart officers Rafael Pérez and Nino Durden. Ovando is an immigrant to the United States and a former member of the powerful 18th Street gang. He is the recipient of the largest police misconduct settlement in Los Angeles history.

Officers Durden and Pérez entered then 19-year-old Ovando's apartment on October 12, 1996, and shot him, leaving him paralyzed. According to the officers' testimony later, they planted a gun on him and reported that the unarmed Ovando had fired on them first. Ovando, paralyzed from the waist down, was sentenced to 23 years in prison based on the officers' testimony.

== Release and settlement ==
On September 16, 1999, Ovando was released from prison after Perez recanted his earlier testimony. The District Attorney's office filed a writ of habeas corpus overturning Ovando's conviction. Ovando had spent two-and-a-half years incarcerated.

On November 21, 2000, Ovando received a $15 million settlement, the largest police misconduct settlement in Los Angeles history.

In 2008, Ovando fled from an attempted traffic stop and led police officers on an hour long high speed pursuit. He was subsequently charged with felony evading and assault on a police officer.
