= Rampart scandal =

1990s police corruption scandal in Los Angeles

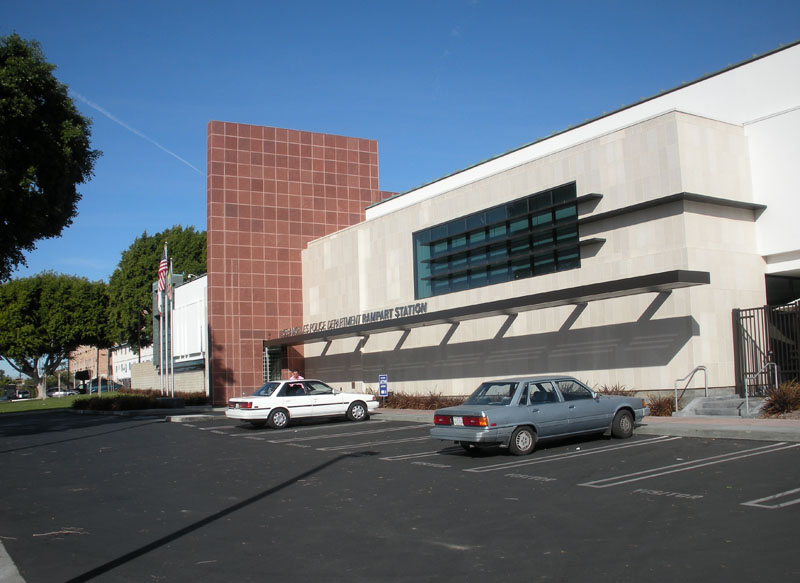
- The New Rampart Police Station, photographed in December 2008, where it houses the LAPD Rampart Division whose personnel is involved in the police corruption scandal
- Date: Late 1990s–early 2000s
- Location: Los Angeles, California, U.S.
- Type: Police corruption, police brutality, perjury
- Cause: Misconduct within the LAPD CRASH unit
- Participants: Los Angeles Police Department (Rampart Division CRASH unit)
- Outcome: Disbandment of CRASH; over 100 convictions overturned; $125 million in civil settlements

The Rampart scandal was a police corruption scandal that unfolded in Los Angeles, California during the late 1990s and early 2000s. The scandal concerned widespread criminal activity within the Community Resources Against Street Hoodlums (CRASH) anti-gang unit of the Los Angeles Police Department's Rampart Division. More than 70 police officers were initially implicated in various forms of misconduct, including police brutality, planting of false evidence, theft, drug dealing, bank robbery, perjury and cover-ups thereof.

Of the 70 officers implicated, enough evidence was uncovered to bring 58 before an internal administrative board and 24 were found to have committed wrongdoing with 12 given suspensions of various lengths, seven forced into resignation or retirement and five terminated. As a result of the falsified evidence and perjury by Rampart CRASH officers, 106 criminal convictions were overturned.

The scandal resulted in more than 140 civil lawsuits against the City of Los Angeles, costing the city an estimated $125 million in settlements. Partly as a result of the scandal, Mayor James Hahn did not rehire Police Chief Bernard C. Parks in 2002. Both the scandal and the de facto firing of Parks are believed to have precipitated Hahn's defeat by Antonio Villaraigosa in the 2005 mayoral election.

== Inciting events ==
=== Kevin Gaines road rage shootout ===
Around 4 p.m. on March 18, 1997, LAPD undercover officer Frank Lyga shot and killed a plainclothes Rampart CRASH officer, Kevin Gaines, in self-defense, following a case of road rage.

According to Lyga and other witnesses, Gaines pulled his green Mitsubishi Montero up to Lyga's Buick and flashed gang signs.

After, Gaines followed Lyga and brandished a .45 ACP handgun. Lyga took out his gun and called for backup using a hidden radio activated by a foot pedal, saying, "Hey, I got a problem. I've got a black guy in a green Jeep coming up here! He's got a gun!" Pulling up at a stop light, Lyga later testified that he heard Gaines shout, "I'll cap you." Lyga fired his 9×19mm Beretta 92 duty pistol into Gaines' SUV twice, one of the bullets lodging in his heart. Lyga radioed one final transmission: "I just shot this guy! I need help! Get up here!" Lyga reported that Gaines was the first to pull a gun and that he responded in self-defense.

In an interview on PBS' Frontline, he said, "In my training experience this guy had 'I'm a gang member' written all over him." Inside of Gaines's car, a Death Row Greatest Hits CD was found, as he was listening to Death Row's inclusion of No Vaseline at the time of the confrontation.

In the ensuing investigation, the LAPD discovered that Gaines had apparently been involved in similar road rage incidents, threatening drivers by brandishing his gun. The investigation also revealed that Gaines was associated with both the Death Row Records record label and its controversial owner and CEO, Suge Knight.

Investigators learned that Death Row Records, which was alleged to be associated with the Bloods street gang, was hiring off-duty LAPD officers to serve as security guards. Following three separate internal investigations, Lyga was exonerated of any wrongdoing. The LAPD concluded that Lyga's shooting was "in policy" and not racially or improperly motivated.

Within three days of the incident, the Gaines family retained attorney Johnnie Cochran and filed a wrongful death lawsuit against the city of Los Angeles, California, for $25 million. The city eventually settled with Cochran for $250,000.

Lyga was angry the city settled, denying him the chance to fully clear his name. Judge Schoettler wrote a letter to LAPD Chief Bernard C. Parks, stating, "Had the matter been submitted to me for a determination, I would have found in favor of the City of Los Angeles." Schoettler's letter alleged political reasons for settling the case, namely City Attorney James Hahn's planned run for mayor and his desire to court black voters.

=== Bank of America robbery ===
On November 6, 1997, $722,000 was stolen in an armed robbery of a Los Angeles Bank of America branch. After one month of investigation, assistant bank manager Errolyn Romero confessed to her role in the crime and implicated her boyfriend LAPD officer David Mack as the mastermind. Mack was sentenced to fourteen years and three months in federal prison. He has never revealed the whereabouts of the money and, while incarcerated, bragged to fellow inmates that he would become a millionaire by the time of his release. He was released from prison on May 14, 2010.

=== Rampart Station beating ===
On February 26, 1998, Rampart CRASH officer Brian Hewitt brought Ismael Jimenez, a member of the 18th Street Gang, into the Rampart police station for questioning. According to CRASH officer Rafael Pérez's recorded testimony, Hewitt "got off" on beating suspects. In the course of questioning, he beat the handcuffed Jimenez in the chest and stomach until he vomited blood.

After his release, Jimenez went to the emergency room and told doctors he had been beaten by Hewitt and his partner Daniel Lujan while in custody. Following an investigation, Hewitt was fired from the LAPD. Jimenez was awarded $231,000 in a civil settlement with the city of Los Angeles. Jimenez served time in federal prison for the distribution of drugs and conspiracy to commit murder and has since been released.

== Investigation ==
On March 27, 1998, LAPD officials discovered that eight pounds of cocaine were missing from an evidence room. Within a week, detectives focused their investigation on Pérez. Concerned with a CRASH unit that had officers working off-duty for Death Row Records, robbing banks, and stealing cocaine, Parks established an internal investigative task force in May 1998.

The task force, later named the Rampart Corruption Task Force, focused on the prosecution of Pérez. Completing an audit of the LAPD property room revealed another pound of missing cocaine which had been booked following a prior arrest by Lyga, the officer who had shot Gaines the year before. Investigators speculated that Pérez may have stolen the cocaine booked by Lyga in retaliation for Gaines' shooting.

Pérez, at that time a nine-year veteran of the LAPD, was arrested on August 25, 1998, for the unauthorized withdrawal and theft of six pounds of cocaine from the evidence room. The cocaine was estimated to be worth $800,000 on the street, or $120,000 wholesale. Although Pérez signed a phony name on the forms when he checked out the drugs, his signature was a "dead bang" match.

As he was arrested, Pérez reportedly asked, "Is this about the bank robbery?" He would later deny that he had any knowledge of Mack's bank robbery and never testified against Mack. Investigators would later discover eleven additional instances of suspicious cocaine transfers. Pérez eventually admitted to ordering cocaine evidence out of property and replacing it with Bisquick.

On September 8, 1999, following a mistrial, Pérez agreed to cut a deal with investigators. He pleaded guilty to the cocaine theft in exchange for providing prosecutors information about two "bad" shootings and three other CRASH officers engaged in illegal activity. For this deal, Pérez received a five-year prison sentence as well as immunity from further prosecution of misconduct short of murder.

Over the next nine months, he met with investigators more than 50 times and provided more than 4,000 pages in sworn testimony. Pérez's testimony implicated about 70 officers of misconduct, but only a dozen officers were suspended or forced to resign.

=== Peréz' framings ===
Pérez framed four members of the Temple Street gang as being associated with the murder of Mexican Mafia member Miguel "Lizard" Malfavon. The incident took place at a McDonald's on Alvarado Street, where four supposed members all planned to kill Malfavon while he tried to collect "taxes" from the gang.

Pérez found a material witness who had blood on her dress, and she named four gang members from Temple Street. He repeatedly changed the name of the main killer and ended up framing Anthony "Stymie" Adams as the one who fatally shot Malfavon in the head with a rifle in the neighboring apartment.

=== CRASH culture ===
In extensive testimony to investigators, Pérez provided details about the internal culture of the elite CRASH unit. Pérez insisted that 90% of CRASH officers were "in the loop", knowingly framing civilians and suspected gang members, and perjuring themselves on the witness stand. Pérez claims his superiors were aware of and encouraged CRASH officers to engage in misconduct; the goal of the unit was to arrest gang members by any means necessary.

Pérez claimed CRASH officers were awarded plaques for shooting civilians and suspects, with extra honors if such persons were killed. Pérez alleges that CRASH officers carried spare guns in their "war bags" to plant on civilians and suspects, in order to avoid responsibility for their alleged crime. In recorded testimony, Pérez revealed the CRASH motto: "We intimidate those who intimidate others."

CRASH officers would get together at the Short Stop, a bar near Dodger Stadium in Echo Park, to drink and celebrate shootings. Supervisors handed out plaques to shooters, containing red or black playing cards. A red card indicated a wounding and a black card indicated a killing, which was considered more prestigious. Pérez testified that at least one Rampart lieutenant attended these celebrations.

Rampart officers wore tattoos of the CRASH logo, a skull with a cowboy hat encircled with poker cards depicting the "dead man's hand", aces and eights.

=== Rampart ties to Death Row Records ===
The Rampart Corruption Task Force investigators discovered that hip hop mogul Suge Knight, owner of Death Row Records, had hired several of the corrupt Rampart officers for security at various times including Nino Durden, Kevin Gaines, David Mack, and Rafael Pérez. Knight was hiring off-duty Rampart policemen to work for Death Row as security guards for substantial amounts of money. After Gaines was killed, investigators discovered Gaines drove a Mercedes-Benz and wore designer suits, and they found a receipt in his apartment for a $952 restaurant tab at the Los Angeles hangout, Monty's Steakhouse.

=== Ties to the Bloods ===
According to Frank Lyga, who shot him, Kevin Gaines was flashing Blood gang signs and waving a gun.

=== Relation to the murder of The Notorious B.I.G. ===
On April 16, 2007, the estate of Christopher George Latore Wallace, a.k.a. The Notorious B.I.G., filed a wrongful death lawsuit against the City of Los Angeles, which also named as defendants Rampart officers Durden, Mack, and Pérez. The lawsuit alleges that Durden, Mack, and Pérez conspired to murder Christopher Wallace, and Pérez and Mack were present on the night of the murder outside the Petersen Automotive Museum on Wilshire Boulevard, on March 9, 1997. On April 5, 2010, the Wallace family withdrew their lawsuit and the claims against the City and the Rampart officers. Perry R. Sanders Jr., a lawyer for the estate, insisted the case was being withdrawn only to avoid interfering with what he called a "reinvigorated" police investigation, and he emphasized that since the suit was dismissed without prejudice, it could be refiled.

LAPD investigators Brian Tyndall and Russell Poole also believed Mack and other Rampart police were involved in a conspiracy to kill Wallace. Poole claimed that Chief Parks refused to investigate their claims of Mack's involvement, suppressed their 40-page report, and instructed investigators not to pursue their inquiries. Poole, an 18-year veteran of the force, quit the LAPD in protest, and later filed a lawsuit against the LAPD for violating his First Amendment rights by preventing him from making his information public.

== Legal settlement ==
The city of Los Angeles faced more than 140 civil suits resulting from the Rampart scandal and paid total estimated settlement costs around $125 million.

Javier Ovando was awarded a $15 million settlement on November 21, 2000, the largest police misconduct settlement in Los Angeles history. Twenty-nine other civil suits were settled for nearly $11 million.

== Alleged cover-ups ==
There have been multiple allegations that Chief Parks and members of the LAPD were actively involved in obstructing the Rampart Investigation. Parks was in charge of Internal Affairs when Gaines and other Rampart officers were first discovered to have ties to the Bloods and Death Row Records. Parks is said to have protected these officers from investigation.

According to Rampart Corruption Task Force Detective Poole, Chief Parks failed to pursue the Hewitt Investigation for a full six months. When Poole presented Parks with a 40-page report detailing the connection between Mack and the murder of Notorious B.I.G., the report was suppressed.

On September 26, 2000, Poole filed a federal civil rights lawsuit against the city of Los Angeles and Chief Parks. Poole, lead investigator on the Lyga-Gaines shooting and member of the Rampart Corruption Task Force, resigned from the department and claimed in his civil suit that Parks shut down his efforts to fully investigate the extent of corruption within the department.

Poole specified conversations and direct orders in which Chief Parks prevented him from pursuing his investigation of the criminal activities of David Mack and Kevin Gaines, notably involving the investigation of the murder of Christopher Wallace.

Many city officials, including Los Angeles County District Attorney Gil Garcetti, expressed a lack of confidence with Parks' handling of the investigation.

== Effects ==
On September 19, 2000, the Los Angeles City Council voted 10 to 2 to accept a consent decree allowing the U.S. Department of Justice to oversee and monitor reforms within the LAPD for a period of five years. The Justice Department, which had been investigating the LAPD since 1996, agreed not to pursue a civil rights lawsuit against the city. Los Angeles Mayor Richard Riordan and Police Chief Parks opposed the consent decree, but were forced to back down in the face of overwhelming support by the city council.

The "L.A.P.D. Board of Inquiry into the Rampart Area Corruption Incident" report was released in March 2000. It made 108 recommendations for changes in LAPD policies and procedures. The Board of Inquiry report, sanctioned by Parks, was widely criticized for not addressing structural problems within the LAPD.

"An Independent Analysis of the Los Angeles Police Department's Board of Inquiry Report on the Rampart Scandal" was published in September 2000 by University of Southern California Law School Professor Erwin Chemerinsky, currently the Dean of University of California, Berkeley School of Law, at the request of the Los Angeles Police Protective League, the police union. Chemerinsky outlined six specific criticisms of the Board of Inquiry report, namely that the LAPD minimized the scope and nature of the corruption, and abetted the corruption through its own internal negligence or corrupt policies. Chemerinsky called for an independent commission to investigate corruption and a consent decree between the City of Los Angeles and the Justice Department to monitor effective reform.

The "Report of the Rampart Independent Review Panel", published in November 2000, created by a panel of over 190 community members, issued 72 findings and 86 recommendations. The report noted the Police Commission had been "undermined by the Mayor's Office" and that the Inspector General's Office had been "hindered by ... lack of cooperation by the (LAPD) in responding to requests for information".

== Political and cultural aftermath ==
The newly elected Mayor James Hahn did not rehire Parks in 2002. This arguably caused Hahn to lose the support of South Los Angeles' black community, leading to his defeat by Antonio Villaraigosa in the 2005 election.

The scandal served as a basis for numerous dramatizations based on or inspired by the event. In 2002, the television series The Shield premiered, depicting a band of rogue Los Angeles police officers. The program was so directly inspired by the Rampart Scandal that "Rampart" was nearly used as the series title. The title was presumably changed in order to avoid potential production issues and conflicts with the LAPD. The plot of the 2004 video game Grand Theft Auto: San Andreas, set in 1992 in the fictional city of Los Santos (based on Los Angeles), is also loosely based on the scandal.

In 2003, the Blue Ribbon Rampart Review Panel, chaired by Constance L. Rice of the Advancement Project, was convened by the Los Angeles Police Commission and Chief William J. Bratton. The panel's report was made public in 2006.

Christopher Dorner, who in February 2013 carried out a series of shootings until killed during a police manhunt in Southern California, referenced the Rampart scandal in his "Facebook manifesto", which began:

From: Christopher Jordan Dorner

To: America

Subj: Last resort

I know most of you who personally know me are in disbelief to hear from media reports that I am suspected of committing such horrendous murders and have taken drastic and shocking actions in the last couple of days.

Unfortunately, this is a necessary evil that I do not enjoy but must partake and complete for substantial change to occur within the LAPD and reclaim my name. The department has not changed since the Rampart and Rodney King days. It has gotten worse. ...

The Rampart scandal was reviewed in the 2018 film City of Lies, based upon the 2002 book LAbyrinth: A Detective Investigates the Murders of Tupac Shakur and Notorious B.I.G., the Implication of Death Row Records' Suge Knight, and the Origins of the Los Angeles Police Scandal by Randall Sullivan. Starring Johnny Depp as Detective Russell Poole and featuring Neil Brown Jr., Shamier Anderson and Amin Joseph as CRASH officers Rafael Pérez, David Mack and Kevin Gaines respectively, the film depicts Poole's investigation of the CRASH unit's criminal activities, their ties to Death Row Records, and his theory of their involvement in the murder of rapper Notorious B.I.G.

City of Lies was scheduled to be released in September 2018, but in July the release was canceled and the film was shelved. The stated reason was due to the negative publicity of Depp's ongoing legal issues, including a lawsuit brought against him that month by the film's location manager. However, director Brad Furman stated he believes Depp was a scapegoat and the studio was pressured by outside forces into cancelling the film. The premiere of City of Lies took place on December 8, 2018, when it was screened out of competition at the Noir Film Festival in Italy.

== See also ==
- Blue wall of silence
- Charles Becker
- Christopher Commission
- Lynwood Vikings
- Police brutality
- Police corruption
- Tom Brown (police officer)
