= Community Resources Against Street Hoodlums =

Former gang crime unit of the Los Angeles Police Department

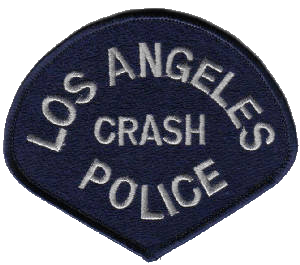
- Patch of the Los Angeles Police Department CRASH division
- Abbreviation: CRASH
- Motto: To Protect and to Serve; We Intimidate Those Who Intimidate Others (unofficial)

Agency overview
- Formed: 1979
- Dissolved: March 4, 2000; 26 years ago
- Superseding agency: LAPD Gang and Narcotics Division

Jurisdictional structure
- Operations jurisdiction: Los Angeles, California, U.S.
- Area: 498 sq mi (1,290 km^{2})
- Population: 3.8 million

Operational structure
- Officers: 300 (estimated)
- Parent agency: Los Angeles Police Department
- Areas: 18: Central; Rampart; Southwest; Hollenbeck; Harbor; Hollywood; Wilshire; West Los Angeles; Van Nuys; West Valley; Northeast; 77th Street; Newton; Pacific; North Hollywood; Foothill; Devonshire; Southeast

The Community Resources Against Street Hoodlums (CRASH) was a specialized gang intelligence unit of the Los Angeles Police Department (LAPD) tasked with combating gang-related crime between 1979 and 2000. The unit was established in the South Central district of Los Angeles, California, United States, to combat rising gang violence during the period. Each of the LAPD's 18 divisions had a CRASH unit assigned to it, whose primary goal was to suppress gang-related crimes in the city, which came about primarily from the increase in illegal drug trade.

CRASH was subject of the Rampart scandal from 1997, which exposed widespread police corruption within the unit assigned to the LAPD's Rampart Division, including involvement in murders, extortion, police brutality, evidence planting, and participating in gang activity. CRASH was disbanded in 2000 and was replaced by the LAPD Gang and Narcotics Division.

== History ==
=== Establishment ===
By 1973, street gangs were quickly becoming a problem in the 77th Street Division of the Los Angeles Police Department (LAPD), located in the South Central area of Los Angeles, California. Deputy Chief Lou Sporrer, commanding officer of South Bureau, responsible for 77th Street Division operations and ultimately responsible to Chief of Police Edward M. Davis, created a unit of uniformed officers and a plainclothes intelligence section. The two were combined to be identified as 77th Street Division TRASH, an acronym for "Total Resources Against Street Hoodlums" with the idea of demeaning gang activities. Community activists began efforts to abolish the TRASH unit, stating the name itself dehumanizes gang members. Sporrer agreed to a name change, with the "T" for Total becoming a "C" for Community and TRASH became CRASH. In addition to gang-related crime prevention, CRASH officers also had to obtain information about a specific gang that was assigned to them and relay that information between districts. The "freedom of movement and activity" and "gung ho" nature of CRASH officers led some of them to incite controversy among themselves and the whole CRASH unit.

In the 1980s, gang violence began to increase dramatically as a result of the drug trade, specifically the introduction of crack cocaine.

=== Operation Hammer ===
Operation Hammer was a CRASH-led initiative that began in 1987 to crack down on gang violence in South Central Los Angeles. As a result of increasing gang violence and a drive-by killing resulting in the deaths of seven people, then-Chief of Police Daryl Gates responded by sending CRASH officers to arrest suspected gang members. At the height of this operation in April 1988, 1,453 people were arrested by one thousand police officers in a single weekend. Despite the large number of initial arrests, they only resulted in 60 felony arrests, and charges were only filed in 32 instances. While considered successful by some, this operation and the LAPD were maligned with accusations of racism; some believed that Operation Hammer heavily employed racial profiling, targeting black youths that were labelled as "urban terrorists" and "ruthless killers." However, proponents of the operation asserted that it was not discriminatory as all gang members arrested had warrants for their arrests.

=== Rampart Division CRASH scandal ===
Every LAPD patrol division had a CRASH unit stationed in it. One of the most prominent CRASH units was stationed in the Rampart Division.

On February 26, 1998, Rampart CRASH officer Brian Hewitt was suspended and later stripped of his job when allegations arose of a cover-up of the beating and asphyxiation of Ismael Jiménez. Hewitt was accused of choking Jiménez in an interview room when the suspect refused to provide evidence of gang activities. When Jiménez reported his beating at a hospital, the evidence implicated Hewitt and led to his termination at a Board of Rights hearing.

In August 1998, the same month that Chief Bernard Parks claimed that the Independent Commission on the Los Angeles Police Department reforms were "essentially complete", officer Rafael Pérez, a nine-year LAPD veteran, was arrested on charges of stealing six pounds (2.7 kilograms) of cocaine from the department's Property Division. Pérez was initially tried on one count of possession of cocaine for sale, grand theft and forgery each. After a mistrial on December 7 of that year, more reports of cocaine theft by Pérez arose. In September 1999, in exchange for partial immunity from prosecution, he testified about a pattern of abuse and misconduct involving seventy CRASH officers, threatening to overturn thousands of criminal convictions.

As part of his plea bargain, Pérez implicated scores of officers from the Rampart Division's anti-gang unit, describing routinely beating gang members, planting evidence on suspects, falsifying reports and covering up unprovoked shootings. As of May 2001, the Rampart investigation had brought fifty-eight officers before an internal administrative board. Of these, twelve were suspended, seven resigned, and five were terminated. Pérez confessed to framing Javier Ovando, an 18th Street Gang member, who was shot by Nino Durden and Pérez on October 12, 1996.

Kevin Starr, the State Librarian of California, wrote in his history of California in the 1990s that "CRASH ... became, in effect, the most badass gang in the city."

== In popular culture ==
A fictionalized version of C.R.A.S.H. appears as the main antagonistic faction in the 2004 open world action-adventure video game Grand Theft Auto: San Andreas. The unit is led by Officers Frank Tenpenny (voiced by Samuel L. Jackson) and Eddie Pulaski (Chris Penn), who have criminal ties in Los Santos (the in-game version of Los Angeles) and often engage in deals with gangs for personal profit. The unit's unofficial motto ("We intimidate those who intimidate others") is explicitly used by Tenpenny with protagonist Carl Johnson (Young Maylay), whom he blackmails into doing various jobs meant to prevent C.R.A.S.H's illicit activities from going public. However, C.R.A.S.H.'s third member, Jimmy Hernández (Armando Riesco), eventually decides to do the right thing and report his partners' illegal activities, causing him to be killed by them. Near the end of the game, Pulaski is killed by Carl, and Tenpenny is arrested for his crimes, but is acquitted in his trial due to an alleged lack of evidence. This enrages the residents of Los Santos, resulting in violence across the city, mirroring the real-life 1992 Los Angeles riots. The riots eventually end after Tenpenny's death in a car crash.

The 1988 film Colors stars Robert Duvall and Sean Penn as two members of C.R.A.S.H.

Although corruption in L.A.'s C.R.A.S.H. unit had yet to be exposed when Training Day was written, Antoine Fuqua has stated that the emergence of the Rampart scandal in the late 1990s catalyzed the completion of the film. Denzel Washington also grew a beard in order to emulate the appearance of Rafael Pérez, an LAPD narcotics officer involved in multiple scandals.

The police drama series The Shield (2002–2008), which revolves around a corrupt anti-gang unit called the Strike Team, is based on the Rampart scandal. Rampart was the original name for the show.

== See also ==
- Gang intelligence unit
- National Gang Intelligence Center
- Safer Cities Initiative
- War on gangs
