= Political corruption =

Use of power by government officials for illegitimate private gain

Map of the Corruption Perceptions Index, 2025, as scored by Transparency international. A higher score indicates greater transparency (i.e., less corruption). The score ranges are: Less corrupt 90–100 80–89 70–79 60–69 50–59 / More corrupt 40–49 30–39 20–29 10–19 0–9 No data

Political corruption is the use of power by government officials or their network contacts for illegitimate private gain. Forms of corruption vary, but can include bribery, lobbying, extortion, cronyism, nepotism, parochialism, patronage, influence peddling, graft, and embezzlement. Corruption may facilitate criminal enterprise, such as drug trafficking, money laundering, and human trafficking, although it is not restricted to these activities.

Over time, corruption has been defined differently. For example, while performing work for a government or as a representative, it is unethical to accept a gift. Any gift could be construed as a scheme to lure the recipient towards some biases. In most cases, the gift is seen as an intention to seek certain favors, such as work promotion, tipping in order to win a contract, job, or exemption from certain tasks in the case of a junior worker handing in the gift to a senior employee who can be key in winning the favor.

Some forms of corruption, now called "institutional corruption", are distinguished from bribery and other kinds of obvious personal gain. For example, certain state institutions may consistently act against the interests of the public, such as by misusing public funds for their own interest, or by engaging in illegal or immoral behavior with impunity. Bribery and overt criminal acts by individuals may not necessarily be evident but the institution nonetheless acts immorally as a whole. The mafia state phenomenon is an example of institutional corruption.

An illegal act by an officeholder constitutes political corruption only if the act is directly related to their official duties, is done under color of law or involves trading in influence. The activities that constitute illegal corruption differ depending on the country or jurisdiction. For instance, some political funding practices that are legal in one place may be illegal in another. In some cases, government officials have broad or ill-defined powers, which make it difficult to distinguish between legal and illegal actions. Worldwide, bribery alone is estimated to involve over 1 trillion US dollars annually. A state of unrestrained political corruption is known as a kleptocracy, literally meaning "rule by thieves".

== Definition ==
Corruption is a difficult concept to define. A proper definition of corruption requires a multi-dimensional approach. The psychologist Horst-Eberhard Richter's modernized version defines corruption as the undermining of political values. Corruption as the decline of virtue has been criticized as too broad and far too subjective to be universalized.

The second dimension of corruption is corruption as deviant behavior. Sociologist Christian Höffling and economist J. J. Sentuira both characterized corruption as social illness; the latter defined corruption as the misuse of public power for one's profit. The third dimension is the quid pro quo. Corruption must always be an exchange between two or more persons/parties where one person/party possesses economic goods, and the other persons/parties possess a transferred power to be used, according to fixed rules and norms, toward a common good. Fourth, there are also different levels of societal perception of corruption.

Heidenheimer divides corruption into three categories. The first category is called white corruption; this level of corruption is mostly viewed with tolerance and may even be lawful and legitimate; it is typically based on family ties and patron-client systems. The type of corruption that often occurring in constitutional states or states transitioning to a more democratic society is called grey corruption is considered reprehensible according to a society's moral norms, but the persons involved are still mostly lacking any sense of doing something wrong.

The third category, black corruption, is so severe that it violates a society's norms and laws. The final dimension is called "shadow politics"; this is part of the informal political process that goes beyond legitimate informal political agreements to behavior that is purposefully concealed.

== Consequences ==
=== Consequences on politics, administration, and institutions ===
Countries with politicians, public officials or close associates implicated in the Panama Papers leak on April 15, 2016

Political corruption undermines democracy and good governance by flouting or even subverting formal processes. Corruption in elections and in the legislature reduces accountability and distorts representation in policymaking; corruption in the judiciary compromises the rule of law; and corruption in public administration results in the inefficient provision of services. For republics, it violates a basic principle of republicanism regarding the centrality of civic virtue.

More generally, corruption erodes the institutional capacity of government if procedures are disregarded, resources are siphoned off, and public offices are bought and sold. Corruption undermines the legitimacy of government and democratic values such as political trust. Recent evidence suggests that variation in the levels of corruption amongst high-income democracies can vary significantly depending on the level of accountability of decision-makers.

Evidence from fragile states shows that corruption and bribery can adversely impact trust in institutions. Corruption can also impact governments' provision of goods and services. It increases the costs of goods and services, which arise from efficiency loss. In the absence of corruption, governmental projects might be cost-effective at their true costs; however, once corruption costs are included, projects may not be cost-effective, so they are not executed, distorting the provision of goods and services.

=== Consequences on economy ===
In the private sector, corruption increases the cost of business through the price of illicit payments themselves, the management cost of negotiating with officials and the risk of breached agreements or detection. Although some claim corruption reduces costs by cutting bureaucracy, the availability of bribes can also induce officials to contrive new rules and delays. Openly removing costly and lengthy regulations is better than covertly allowing them to be bypassed by using bribes. Where corruption inflates the cost of business, it also distorts the field of inquiry and action, shielding firms with connections from competition and thereby sustaining inefficient firms.

Corruption may have a direct impact on the firm's effective marginal tax rate. Bribing tax officials can reduce the firm's tax payments if the marginal bribe rate is below the official marginal tax rate. However, in Uganda, bribes have a higher negative impact on firms' activity than taxation. A one percentage point increase in bribes reduces a firm's annual growth by three percentage points, while an increase in 1 percentage point in taxes reduces a firm's growth by one percentage point.

Corruption also generates economic distortion in the public sector by diverting public investment into capital projects where bribes and kickbacks are more plentiful. Officials may increase the technical complexity of public sector projects to conceal or pave the way for such dealings, thus further distorting investment. Corruption also lowers compliance with construction, environmental, or other regulations, reduces the quality of government services and infrastructure, and increases budgetary pressures on government.

Economists argue that one of the factors behind the differing economic development in Africa and Asia is that in Africa, corruption has primarily taken the form of rent extraction with the resulting financial capital moved overseas rather than invested at home. Hence the stereotypical, but often accurate, image of African dictators having Swiss bank accounts. In Nigeria, for example, more than $400 billion was stolen from the treasury by Nigeria's leaders between 1960 and 1999.

University of Massachusetts Amherst researchers estimated that from 1970 to 1996, capital flight from 30 Sub-Saharan countries totaled $187bn, exceeding those nations' external debts. The results, expressed in retarded or suppressed development, have been modeled in theory by economist Mancur Olson. In the case of Africa, one of the factors for this behavior was political instability and the fact that new governments often confiscated previous governments' corruptly obtained assets. This encouraged officials to stash their wealth abroad, out of reach of any future expropriation. In contrast, Asian administrations such as Suharto's New Order often took a cut on business transactions or provided conditions for development through infrastructure investment, law and order, etc.

=== Corruption risks in public procurement ===
Public procurement is particularly vulnerable to corruption because it involves substantial public expenditure and frequent interactions between government officials and private contractors. According to the Organisation for Economic Co-operation and Development (OECD), corruption risks can arise throughout the procurement process, including the preparation of contract specifications, the evaluation of bids and the supervision of awarded contracts. Potential abuses include tailoring requirements to favour particular companies, collusion among bidders and approving payments for goods or services that have not been delivered.

Measures intended to reduce these risks include transparent procurement procedures, electronic tendering systems, conflict-of-interest safeguards and independent oversight. The OECD also recommends risk-based monitoring to identify potentially suspicious practices, such as repeated single-bid contracts or unjustified changes to contract terms. Such indicators do not necessarily establish that corruption has occurred, but can provide grounds for further investigation.

=== Environmental and social effects ===
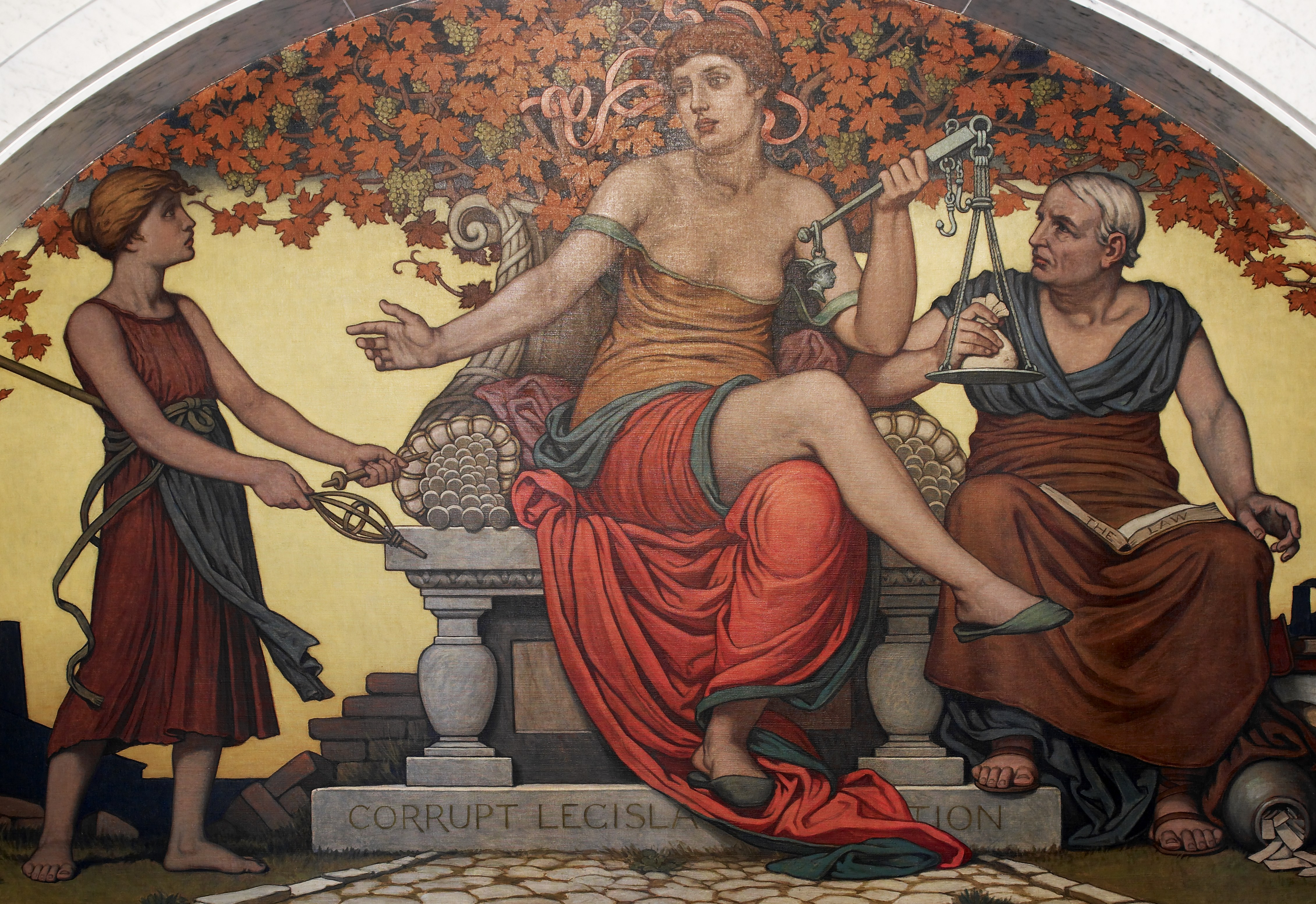
Detail from Corrupt Legislation (1896) by Elihu Vedder. Library of Congress Thomas Jefferson Building, Washington, D.C.

Corruption is often most evident in countries with the smallest per capita incomes, relying on foreign aid for health services. Local political interception of donated money from overseas is especially prevalent in Sub-Saharan African nations, where it was reported in the 2006 World Bank Report that about half of the funds that were donated for health uses were never invested into the health sectors or given to those needing medical attention.

Instead, the donated money was expended through "counterfeit drugs, siphoning off of drugs to the black market, and payments to ghost employees". Ultimately, there is a sufficient amount of money for health in developing countries, but local corruption denies the wider citizenry the resource they require.

Corruption facilitates environmental destruction. While corrupt societies may have formal legislation to protect the environment, it cannot be enforced if officials can easily be bribed. The same applies to social rights worker protection, unionization prevention, and child labor. Violations of these laws and rights enable corrupt countries to gain illegitimate economic advantage in the international market. The Nobel Prize-winning economist Amartya Sen has observed that "there is no such thing as an apolitical food problem." While drought and other naturally occurring events may trigger famine conditions, it is government action or inaction that determines its severity, and often even whether or not a famine will occur.

Governments with strong tendencies towards kleptocracy can undermine food security even when harvests are good. Officials often steal state property. In Bihar, India, more than 80% of the subsidized food aid to the poor is stolen by corrupt officials. Similarly, food aid is often robbed at gunpoint by governments, criminals, and warlords alike, and sold for a profit. The 20th century is full of many examples of governments undermining the food security of their own nations – sometimes intentionally.

=== Effects on humanitarian aid ===
The scale of humanitarian aid to the poor and unstable regions of the world grows, but it is highly vulnerable to corruption, with food aid, construction and other highly valued assistance as the most at risk. Food aid can be directly and physically diverted from its intended destination, or indirectly through the manipulation of assessments, targeting, registration and distributions to favor certain groups or individuals.

In construction and shelter, there are numerous opportunities for diversion and profit through substandard workmanship, kickbacks for contracts and favouritism in the provision of valuable shelter material. Thus, while humanitarian aid agencies are usually most concerned about aid being diverted by including too many recipients themselves are most concerned about exclusion. Access to aid may be limited to those with connections, to those who pay bribes or are forced to give sexual favors. Equally, those able to do so may manipulate statistics to inflate the number of beneficiaries and siphon off additional assistance.

Malnutrition, illness, wounds, torture, harassment of specific groups within the population, disappearances, extrajudicial executions and the forcible displacement of people are all found in many armed conflicts. Aside from their direct effects on the individuals concerned, the consequences of these tragedies for local systems must also be considered: the destruction of crops and places of cultural importance, and the breakdown of economic infrastructure and of health-care facilities such as hospitals.

Corruption is said by Nazim et al, to play a huge role in the health care system, starting from the hospital to the government and extending to other institutions that promote quality and affordable health care to the people.

== Types ==
=== Bribery ===
In the context of political corruption, a bribe may involve a payment given to a government official in exchange for his use of official powers. Bribery requires two participants: one to give the bribe, and one to take it. Either may initiate the corrupt offering; for example, a customs official may demand bribes to let through allowed (or disallowed) goods, or a smuggler might offer bribes to gain passage. In some countries the culture of corruption extends to every aspect of public life, making it extremely difficult for individuals to operate without resorting to bribes.

Bribes may be demanded in order for an official to do something he is already paid to do. They may also be demanded in order to bypass laws and regulations. In addition to their role in private financial gain, bribes are also used to intentionally and maliciously cause harm to another (i.e., no financial incentive). In some developing nations, up to half of the population has paid bribes during the past 12 months.

The Council of Europe dissociates active and passive bribery and incriminates them as separate offences:

- One can define active bribery as "the promising, offering or giving by any person, directly or indirectly, of any undue advantage to any of its public officials, for himself or herself or for anyone else, for him or her to act or refrain from acting in the exercise of his or her functions" (article 2 of the Criminal Law Convention on Corruption (ETS 173) of the Council of Europe).
- Passive bribery can be defined as "when committed intentionally, the request or receipt by any ... public officials, directly or indirectly, of any undue advantage, for himself or herself or for anyone else, or the acceptance of an offer or a promise of such an advantage, to act or refrain from acting in the exercise of his or her functions" (article 3 of the Criminal Law Convention on Corruption (ETS 173)).

This dissociation aims to make the early steps (offering, promising, requesting an advantage) of a corrupt deal already an offence and, thus, to give a clear signal (from a criminal-policy point of view) that bribery is not acceptable. Such a dissociation makes the prosecution of bribery offences easier since it can be very difficult to prove that two parties (the bribe-giver and the bribe-taker) have formally agreed upon a corrupt deal. There is often no such formal deal but only a mutual understanding. For instance, when it is common knowledge in a municipality that to obtain a building permit one has to pay a "fee" to the decision maker to obtain a favorable decision. A working definition of corruption is also provided as follows in article 3 of the Civil Law Convention on Corruption (ETS 174):

For the purpose of this Convention, "corruption" means requesting, offering, giving or accepting, directly or indirectly, a bribe or any other undue advantage or prospect thereof, which distorts the proper performance of any duty or behavior required of the recipient of the bribe, the undue advantage or the prospect thereof.

=== Trading in influence ===
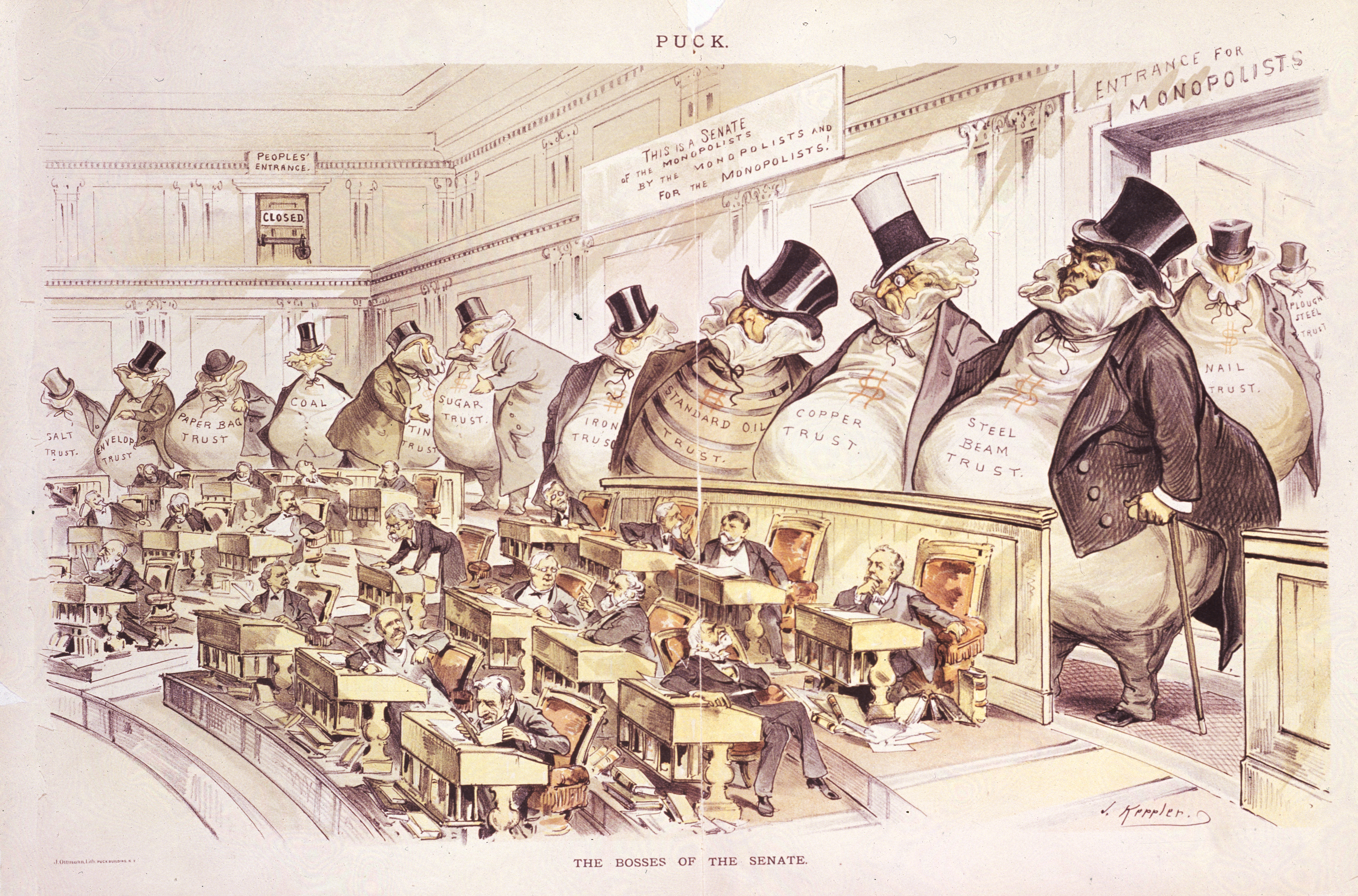
Reformers like the American Joseph Keppler depicted the Senate as controlled by the giant moneybags, who represented the nation's financial trusts and monopolies.

Trading in influence, or influence peddling, refers to a person selling his/her influence over the decision-making process to benefit a third party (person or institution). The difference with bribery is that this is a tri-lateral relation. From a legal point of view, the role of the third party (who is the target of the influence) does not really matter, although he/she can be an accessory in some instances.

=== Legal ===
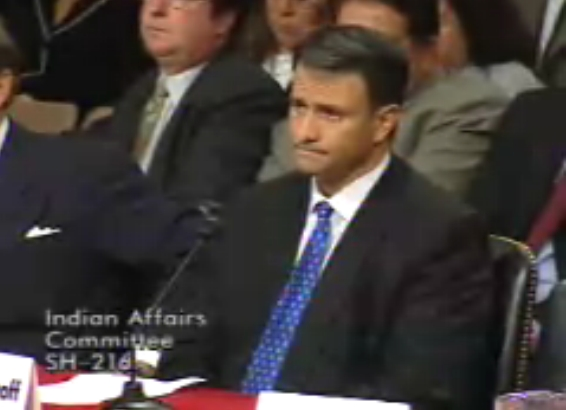
American lobbyist and businessman Jack Abramoff was at the center of an extensive corruption investigation.

Some forms of lobbying can be difficult to distinguish from some forms of illegal political corruption; for instance, law- or decision-makers can freely "sell" their vote, decision power or influence to those lobbyists who offer the highest compensation, including where, for instance, the latter act on behalf of powerful clients such as industrial groups who want to avoid the passing of specific environmental, social, or other regulations perceived as too stringent, etc. Where lobbying is (sufficiently) regulated, it becomes possible to provide for distinctive criteria and to consider that trading in influence involves the use of "improper influence", as in article 12 of the Criminal Law Convention on Corruption (ETS 173) of the Council of Europe.

=== Patronage ===
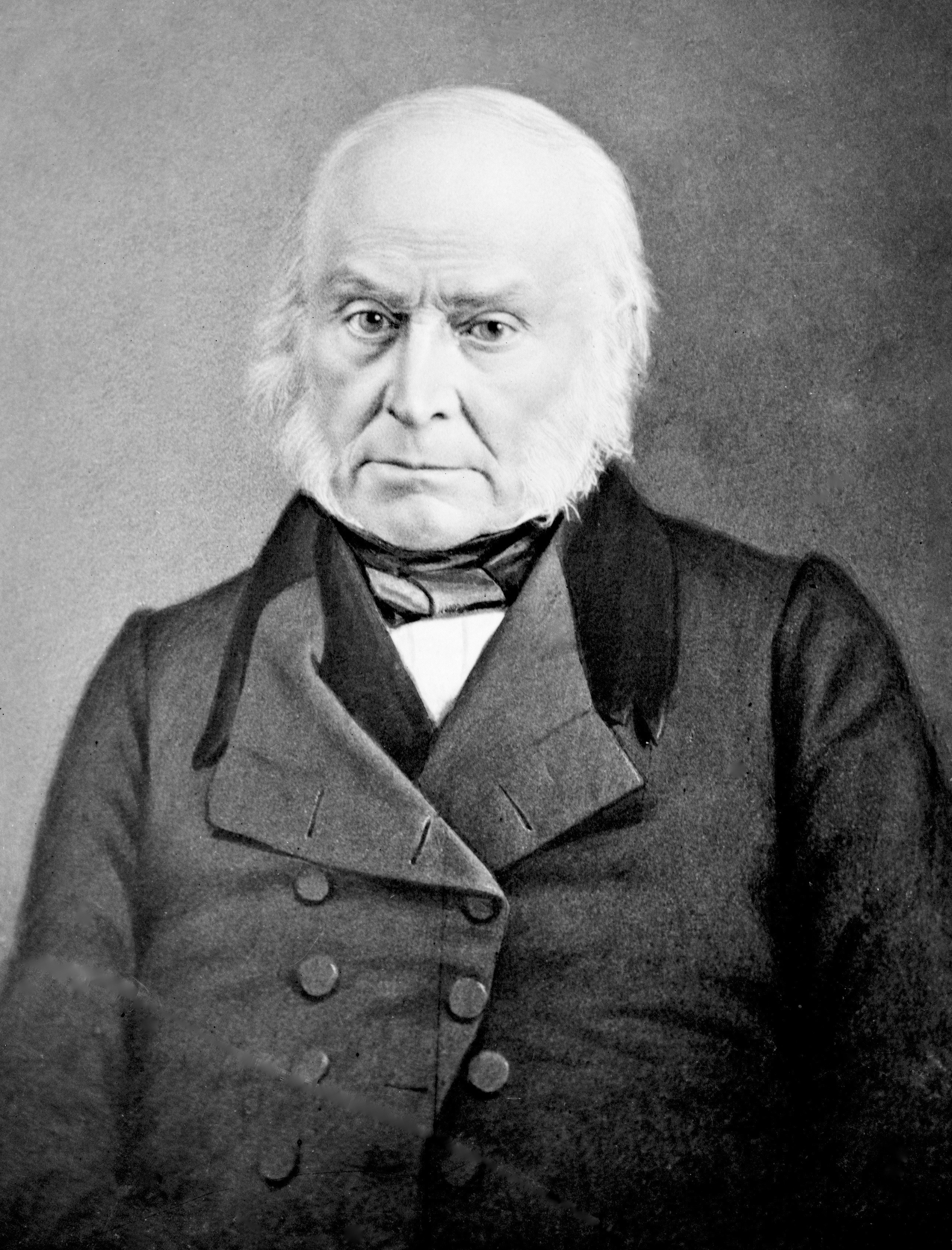
The sixth president of the United States, John Quincy Adams' "corrupt bargain" of 1824 is an example of patronage.

Patronage refers to favoring supporters, for example with government employment. This may be legitimate, as when a newly elected government changes the top officials in the administration in order to effectively implement its policy. It can be seen as corruption if this means that incompetent persons, as a payment for supporting the regime, are selected before more able ones. In nondemocracies, many government officials are often selected for loyalty rather than ability.

They may be almost exclusively selected from a particular group (for example, Sunni Arabs in Saddam Hussein's Iraq, the nomenklatura in the Soviet Union, or the Junkers in Imperial Germany) that support the regime in return for such favors. A similar problem can also be seen in Eastern Europe, for example in Romania, where the government is often accused of patronage (when a new government comes to power, it rapidly changes most of the officials in the public sector).

=== Nepotism and cronyism ===
Favoring relatives (nepotism) or personal friends (cronyism) of an official is a form of illegitimate private gain. This may be combined with bribery, for example, demanding that a business should employ a relative of an official controlling regulations affecting the business. The most extreme example is when the entire state is inherited, as in North Korea or Syria. A lesser form might be in the Southern United States with Good ol' boys, where women and minorities are excluded.

A milder form of cronyism is an "old boy network", in which appointees to official positions are selected only from a closed and exclusive social network – such as the alumni of particular universities – instead of appointing the most competent candidate. Seeking to harm enemies becomes corruption when official powers are illegitimately used as means to this end. For example, trumped-up charges are often brought up against journalists or writers who bring up politically sensitive issues, such as a politician's acceptance of bribes.

=== Gombeenism and parochialism ===
Gombeenism refers to an individual who is dishonest and corrupt for the purpose of personal gain, often monetary, while parochialism, which is also known as parish pump politics, relates to placing local or vanity projects ahead of the national interest. For instance, in Irish politics, populist left-wing political parties will often apply these terms to mainstream establishment political parties and will cite the many cases of corruption in Ireland, such as the Irish banking crisis, which found evidence of bribery, cronyism and collusion, where in some cases politicians who were coming to the end of their political careers would receive a senior management or committee position in a company they had dealings with.

=== Electoral fraud ===
Electoral fraud is illegal interference with the process of an election. Acts of fraud affect vote counts to bring about an election result, whether by increasing the vote share of the favored candidate, depressing the vote share of the rival candidates, or both. Also called voter fraud, the mechanisms involved include illegal voter registration, intimidation at polls, voting computer hacking, and improper vote counting.

=== Embezzlement ===
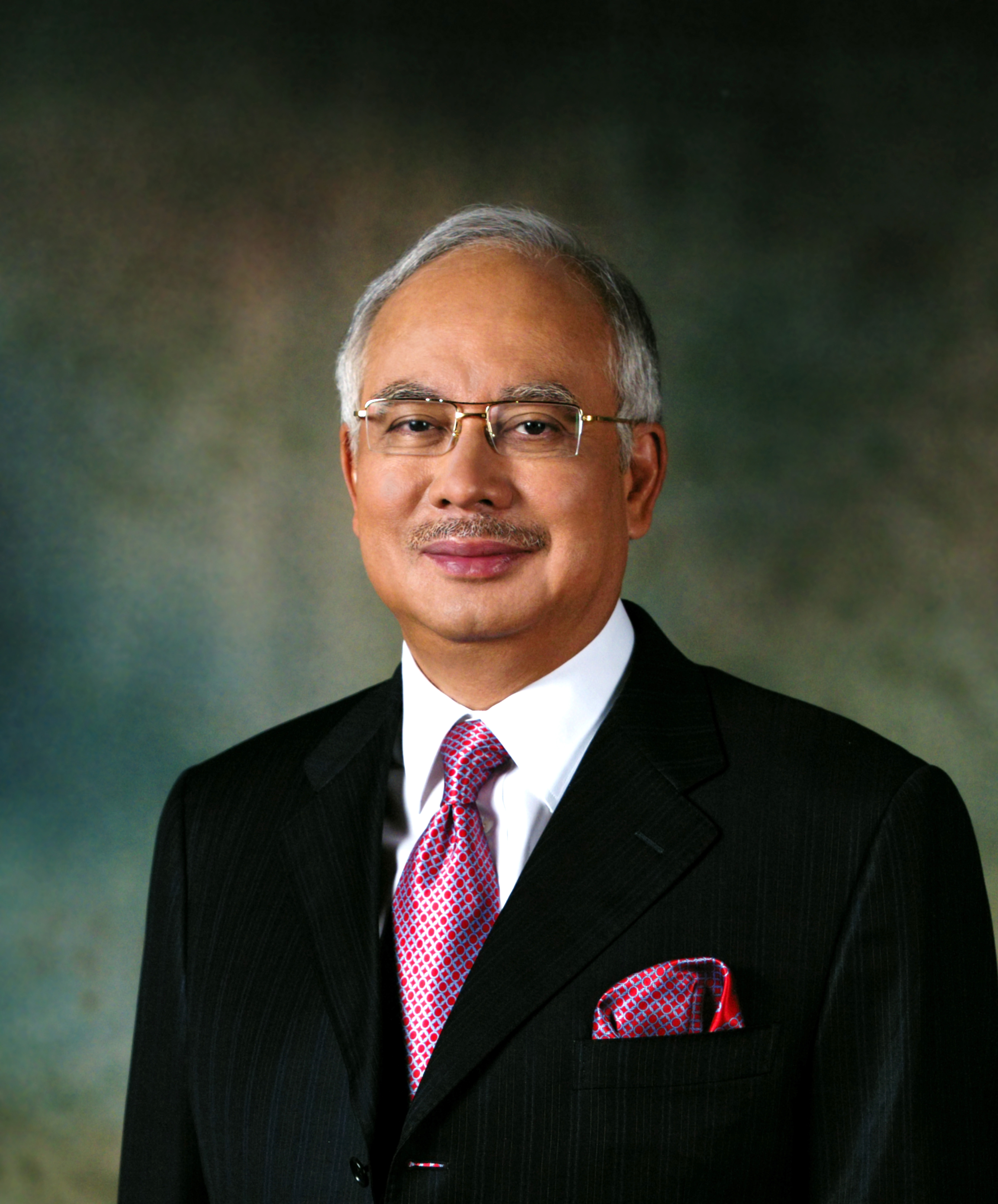
Malaysia's former Prime Minister Najib Razak was found guilty in the corruption trial over the multi-billion-dollar 1MDB scandal. He is currently serving his sentence in Kajang Prison.

Embezzlement is the theft of entrusted funds. It is political when it involves public money taken by a public official for use by anyone not specified by the public. Ponzi schemes are an example of embezzlement. Some embezzlers "skim off the top" so that they continually acquire a small amount over a particular time interval. This method reduces the likelihood of being caught.

On the other hand, some embezzlers steal a very large amount of goods or funds in a single instance and then disappear. Sometimes company managers underreport income to their supervisors and keep the difference. A common type of embezzlement is that of personal use of entrusted government resources; for example, when an official assigns public employees to renovate his own house.

=== Kickbacks ===
A kickback is an official's share of misappropriated funds allocated from his or her organization to an organization involved in corrupt bidding. For example, suppose that a politician is in charge of choosing how to spend some public funds. He can give a contract to a company that is not the best bidder, or allocate more than they deserve.

In this case, the company benefits, and in exchange for betraying the public, the official receives a kickback payment, which is a portion of the sum the company received. This sum itself may be all or a portion of the difference between the actual inflated payment to the company and the lower market-based price that would have been paid had the bidding been competitive.

Another example of a kickback would be if a judge receives a portion of the profits that a business makes in exchange for his judicial decisions. Kickbacks are not limited to government officials; any situation in which people are entrusted to spend funds that do not belong to them is susceptible to this kind of corruption.

=== Unholy alliance ===
An unholy alliance is a coalition among seemingly antagonistic groups for ad hoc or hidden gain, generally some influential non-governmental group forming ties with political parties, supplying funding in exchange for favorable treatment. Like patronage, unholy alliances are not necessarily illegal, but unlike patronage, by its deceptive nature and often great financial resources, an unholy alliance can be more dangerous to the public interest. An early use of the term was by former United States president Theodore Roosevelt ("To destroy this invisible Government, to dissolve the unholy alliance between corrupt business and corrupt politics is the first task of the statesmanship of the day") from the 1912 Progressive Party platform, which is attributed to Roosevelt, and also quoted again in his autobiography, where he connects trusts and monopolies (sugar interests, Standard Oil, etc.) to Woodrow Wilson, Howard Taft, and consequently both major political parties.

=== Involvement in organized crime ===
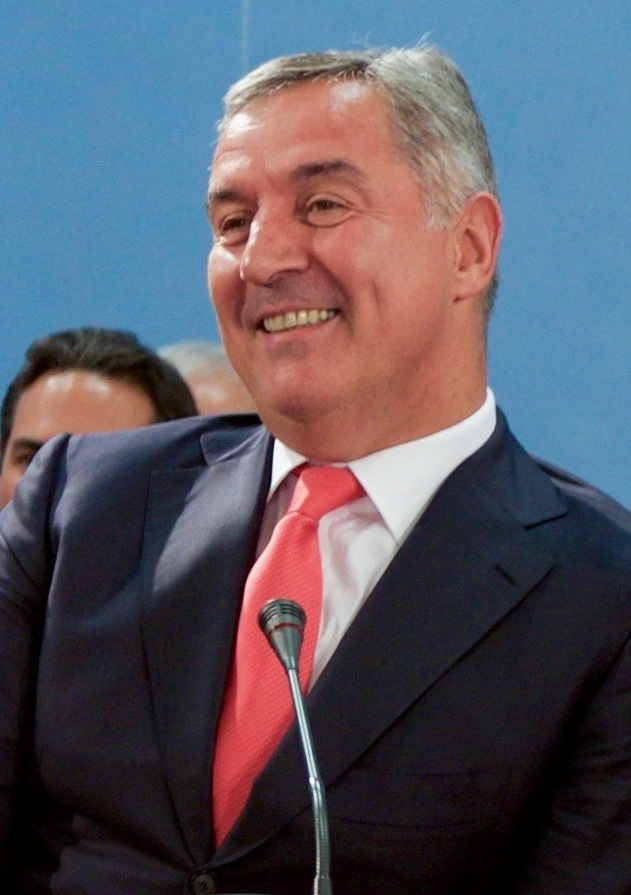
Montenegro's former president Milo Đukanović is often described as having strong links to the Montenegrin mafia.

An illustrative example of official involvement in organized crime can be found from the 1920s and 1930s Shanghai, where Huang Jinrong was a police chief in the French concession, while simultaneously being a gang boss and co-operating with Du Yuesheng, the local gang ringleader. The relationship kept the flow of profits from the gang's gambling dens, prostitution, and protection rackets undisturbed and safe. The United States accused Manuel Noriega's government in Panama of being a "narcokleptocracy", a corrupt government profiting on the illegal drug trade. Later, the U.S. invaded Panama and captured Noriega.

== Conditions favorable for corruption ==
Some research indicates that political corruption is contagious: the revelation of corruption in a sector leads others in the sector to engage in corruption. It is argued that the following conditions are favorable for corruption:

- Information deficits
  - Lacking freedom of information legislation. In contrast, for example: The Indian Right to Information Act 2005 is perceived to have "already engendered mass movements in the country that are bringing the lethargic, often corrupt bureaucracy to its knees and changing power equations completely."
  - Lack of investigative reporting in the local media.
  - Contempt for or negligence in exercising freedom of speech and freedom of the press.
  - Weak accounting practices, including lack of timely financial management.
  - Lack of measurement of corruption. For example, using regular surveys of households and businesses in order to quantify the degree of perception of corruption in different parts of a nation or in different government institutions may increase awareness of corruption and create pressure to combat it. This will also enable an evaluation of the officials who are fighting corruption and the methods used.
  - Tax havens are countries that tax their own citizens and companies but not those from other nations and refuse to disclose information necessary for foreign taxation. This enables large-scale political corruption in the foreign nations.
- Lacking control of the government.
  - Lacking civic society and non-governmental organizations which monitor the government.
  - An individual voter may have a rational ignorance regarding politics, especially in nationwide elections, since each vote has little weight.
  - Weak civil service, and slow pace of reform.
  - Weak rule of law.
  - Weak legal profession.
  - Weak judicial independence.
  - Lacking protection of whistleblowers.
    - Government Accountability Project
  - Lack of benchmarking, that is continual detailed evaluation of procedures and comparison to others who do similar things, in the same government or others, in particular comparison to those who do the best work. The Peruvian organization Ciudadanos al Día has started to measure and compare transparency, costs, and efficiency in different government departments in Peru. It annually awards the best practices, which have received widespread media attention. This has created competition among government agencies in order to improve.
  - Individual officials routinely handle cash, instead of handling payments by giro or on a separate cash desk – illegitimate withdrawals from supervised bank accounts are much more difficult to conceal.
  - Public funds are centralized rather than distributed. For example, if $1,000 is embezzled from a local agency that has $2,000 in funds, it is easier to notice than from a national agency with $2,000,000 in funds. See the principle of subsidiarity.
  - Large, unsupervised public investments.
  - Pay disproportionately lower than that of the average citizen.
  - Government licenses needed to conduct business, e.g., import licenses, encourage bribing and kickbacks.
  - Long-time work in the same position may create relationships inside and outside the government which encourage and help conceal corruption and favoritism. Rotating government officials to different positions and geographic areas may help prevent this; for instance, certain high-ranking officials in French government services (e.g., treasurer-paymasters general) must rotate every few years.
  - Costly political campaigns, with expenses exceeding normal sources of political funding, especially when funded with taxpayer money.
  - A single group or family controlling most of the key government offices. Lack of laws forbidding and limiting the number of members of the same family to be in office.
  - Less interaction with officials reduces the opportunities for corruption. For example, using the Internet for sending in required information, like applications and tax forms, and then processing this with automated computer systems. This may also speed up the processing and reduce unintentional human errors. See e-Government.
  - A windfall from exporting abundant natural resources may encourage corruption. (See Resource curse)
  - War and other forms of conflict correlate with a breakdown of public security.
- Social conditions
  - Self-interested closed cliques and "old boy networks".
  - Family-, and clan-centered social structure, with a tradition of nepotism/favouritism being acceptable.
  - A gift economy, such as the Soviet blat system, emerges in a Communist centrally planned economy.
  - Lacking literacy and education among the population.
  - Frequent discrimination and bullying among the population.
  - Tribal solidarity, giving benefits to certain ethnic groups. In the Indian political system, for example, it has become common that the leadership of national and regional parties is passed from generation to generation, creating a system in which a family holds the center of power. Some examples are most of the Dravidian parties of South India and also the Nehru-Gandhi family of the Congress party, which is one of the two major political parties in India.
  - Lack of strong laws that forbid members of the same family to contest elections and be in office, as in India, where local elections are often contested between members of the same powerful family by standing in opposite parties so that whoever is elected, that particular family is at tremendous benefit.

=== Media ===
Thomas Jefferson observed a tendency for "The functionaries of every government ... to command at will the liberty and property of their constituents. There is no safe deposit [for liberty and property] ... without information. Where the press is free, and every man able to read, all is safe." Recent research supports Jefferson's claim. Brunetti and Weder found "evidence of a significant relationship between more press freedom and less corruption in a large cross-section of countries." They also presented "evidence which suggests that the direction of causation runs from higher press freedom to lower corruption." Adserà, Boix, and Payne found that increases in newspaper readership led to increased political accountability and lower corruption in data from roughly 100 countries and from different states in the US.

Snyder and Strömberg found "that a poor fit between newspaper markets and political districts reduces press coverage of politics. ... Congressmen who are less covered by the local press work less for their constituencies: they are less likely to stand witness before congressional hearings ... . Federal spending is lower in areas where there is less press coverage of the local members of congress." Schulhofer-Wohl and Garrido found that the year after the Cincinnati Post closed in 2007, "fewer candidates ran for municipal office in the Kentucky suburbs most reliant on the Post, incumbents became more likely to win re-election, and voter turnout and campaign spending fell.

A comparative study of political scandals at Westminster found that media exposure alone was insufficient to produce institutional reform. Statutory change occurred only when sustained coverage framed misconduct as a systemic problem, political parties reached a minimum consensus on reform, and a workable legislative mechanism was available.

An analysis of the evolution of mass media in the United States and European Union since World War II noted mixed results from the growth of the Internet: "The digital revolution has been good for freedom of expression [and] information [but] has had mixed effects on freedom of the press": It has disrupted traditional sources of funding, and new forms of Internet journalism have replaced only a tiny fraction of what has been lost. Media responses to whistleblower incidents or reports, and to matters which generate skepticism in established law and government but may not technically be whistleblower incidents, are limited by the prevalence of political correctness and speech codes in many Western nations. In China and many other East Asian countries, the state-enforced speech codes limit or, in their view, channel the efforts of the media and civil society to reduce public corruption.

=== Size of public sector ===
Extensive and diverse public spending is, in itself, inherently at risk of cronyism, kickbacks, and embezzlement. Complicated regulations and arbitrary, unsupervised official conduct exacerbate the problem. This is one argument for privatization and deregulation. Opponents of privatization see the argument as ideological. The argument that corruption necessarily follows from the opportunity is weakened by the existence of countries with low to non-existent corruption but large public sectors, like the Nordic countries. These countries score high on the Ease of Doing Business Index, due to good and often simple regulations and have the rule of law firmly established. Therefore, due to their lack of corruption in the first place, they can run large public sectors without inducing political corruption. Recent evidence that takes both the size of expenditures and regulatory complexity into account has found that high-income democracies with more expansive state sectors do indeed have higher levels of corruption.

Like other governmental economic activities, privatization, such as in the sale of government-owned property, is particularly at risk of cronyism. Privatizations in Russia, Latin America, and East Germany were accompanied by large-scale corruption during the sale of the state-owned companies. Those with political connections unfairly gained large wealth, which has discredited privatization in these regions. While media have reported widely the grand corruption that accompanied the sales, studies have argued that in addition to increased operating efficiency, daily petty corruption is, or would be, larger without privatization and that corruption is more prevalent in non-privatized sectors. Furthermore, there is evidence to suggest that extralegal and unofficial activities are more prevalent in countries that privatized less. In the European Union, the principle of subsidiarity is applied: a government service should be provided by the lowest, most local authority that can competently provide it. An effect is that distribution of funds in multiple instances discourages embezzlement because even small sums missing will be noticed. In contrast, in a centralized authority, even minute proportions of public funds can be large sums of money.

== Conditions unfavorable for corruption ==
Wealth and power can have a compounding effect on political corruption; however, the immunity from the law that money and influence bring will not come into effect when a powerful individual injures or harms another powerful individual. An example of this immunity being broken is Bernie Madoff, who, while being rich and powerful himself, stole from other rich and powerful individuals. This resulted in his eventual arrest despite his status. The level of political competitiveness can affect the degree of political corruption. Increasing salaries can decrease political corruption in lower-income countries, while another study found an increase in political corruption with larger salaries of politicians relative to the average wage. Lower political corruption was found for incumbent politicians seeking re-election. Political corruption can be reduced by campaign finance regulations, open government, deterrence, and cooling-off periods.

== Governmental corruption ==
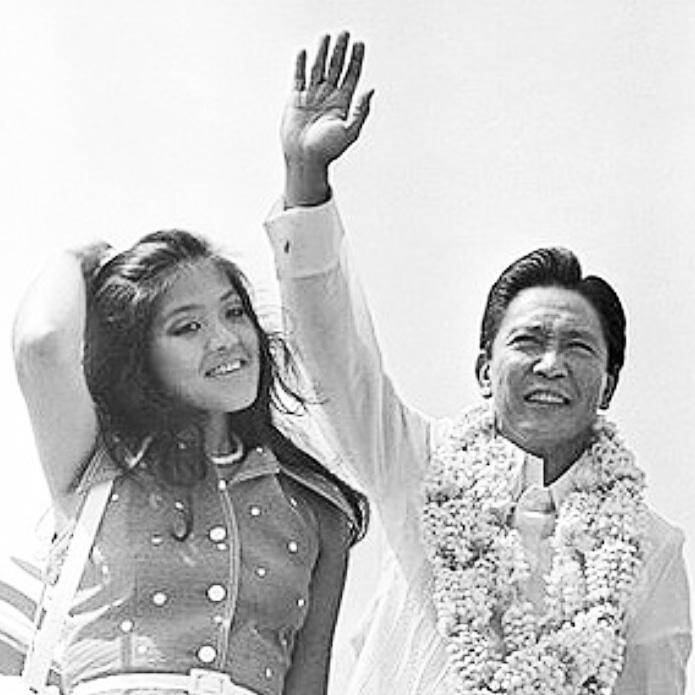
Ferdinand Marcos (pictured with his daughter Imee) was a Philippine dictator and kleptocrat. His regime was infamous for its corruption.

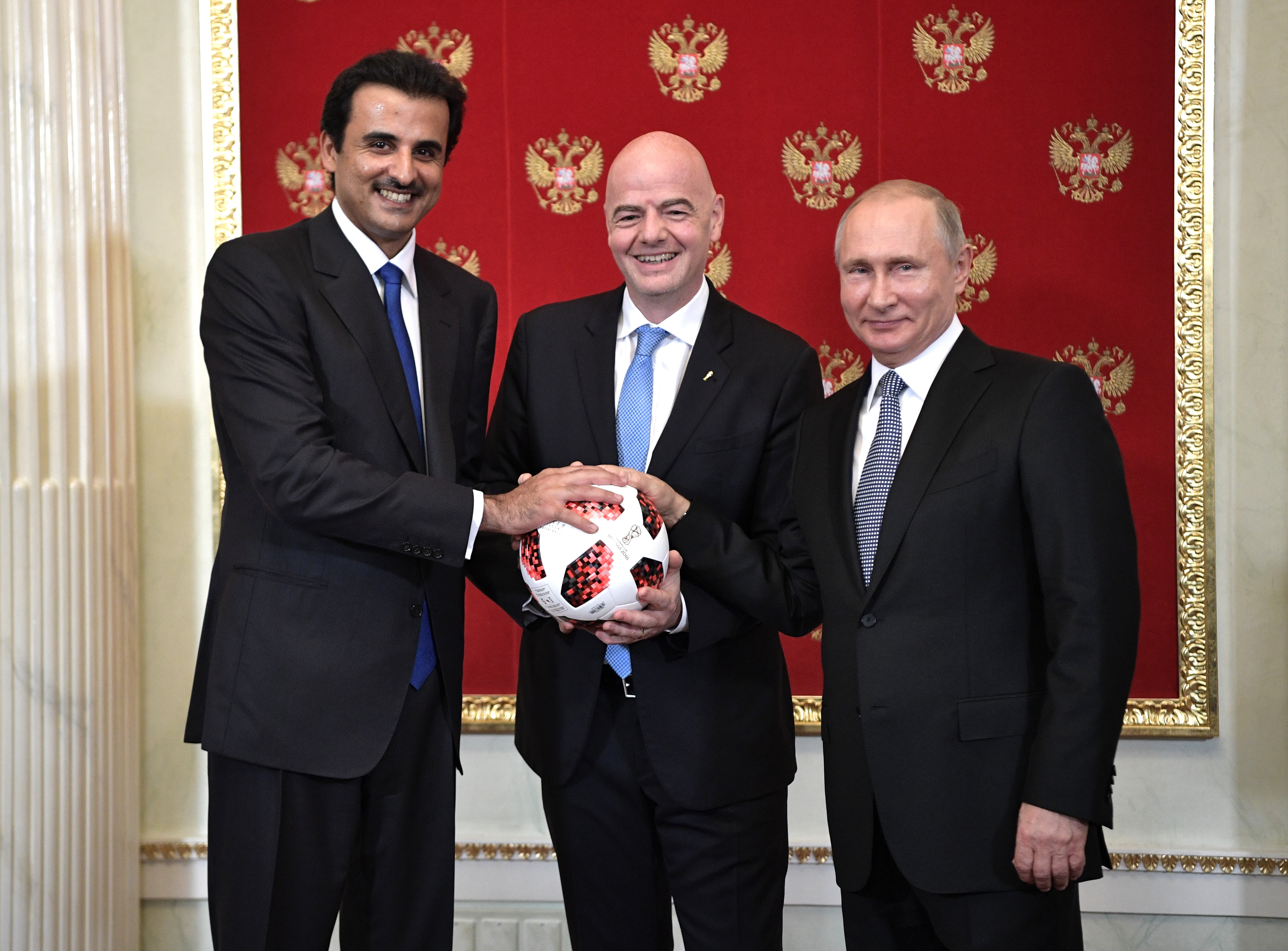
Russia handing over the symbolic relay baton for the hosting rights of the 2022 FIFA World Cup to Qatar in June 2018

If the highest echelons of the government take advantage of corruption or embezzlement from the state's treasury, it is sometimes referred to the neologism kleptocracy. Members of the government can take advantage of the natural resources (e.g., diamonds and oil in a few prominent cases) or state-owned productive industries. Several corrupt governments have enriched themselves via foreign aid. Indeed, there is a positive correlation between aid flows and high levels of corruption within recipient countries.

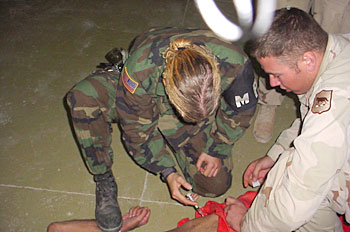
US Military Police officer restraining and sedating prisoner while a soldier holds him down

Corruption in Sub-Saharan Africa consists primarily of extracting economic rent and moving the resulting financial capital overseas instead of investing at home. Authors Leonce Ndikumana and James K. Boyce estimate that from 1970 to 2008, capital flight from 33 sub-Saharan countries totalled $700 billion. A corrupt dictatorship typically results in many years of general hardship and suffering for the vast majority of citizens as civil society and the rule of law disintegrate. In addition, corrupt dictators routinely ignore economic and social problems in their quest to amass ever more wealth and power. The classic case of a corrupt, exploitative dictator often given is the regime of Marshal Mobutu Sese Seko, who ruled the Democratic Republic of the Congo (which he renamed Zaire) from 1965 to 1997.

It is said that usage of the term kleptocracy gained popularity largely in response to a need to accurately describe Mobutu's regime. Another classic case is Nigeria, especially under the rule of General Sani Abacha, who was de facto president of Nigeria from 1993 until his death in 1998. He is reputed to have stolen some US$3 billion–4 billion. He and his relatives are often mentioned in Nigerian 419 letter scams claiming to offer vast fortunes for "help" in laundering his stolen "fortunes", which in reality turn out not to exist. More than $400 billion was stolen from the treasury by Nigeria's leaders between 1960 and 1999.

=== Judiciary corruption ===
There are two methods of corruption of the judiciary: the state (through budget planning and various privileges), and the private. The budget of the judiciary in many transitional and developing countries is almost completely controlled by the executive. The latter undermines the separation of powers, as it creates a critical financial dependence of the judiciary. The proper national wealth distribution, including government spending on the judiciary, is a subject of constitutional economics. Judicial corruption can be difficult to completely eradicate, even in developed countries.

== Opposition to corruption ==
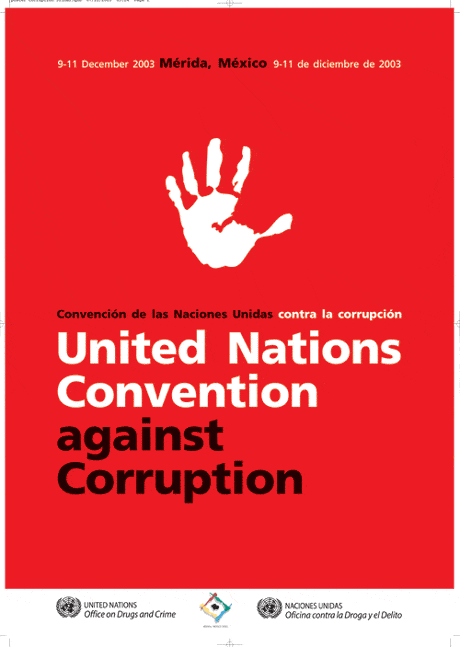
The United Nations Convention against Corruption

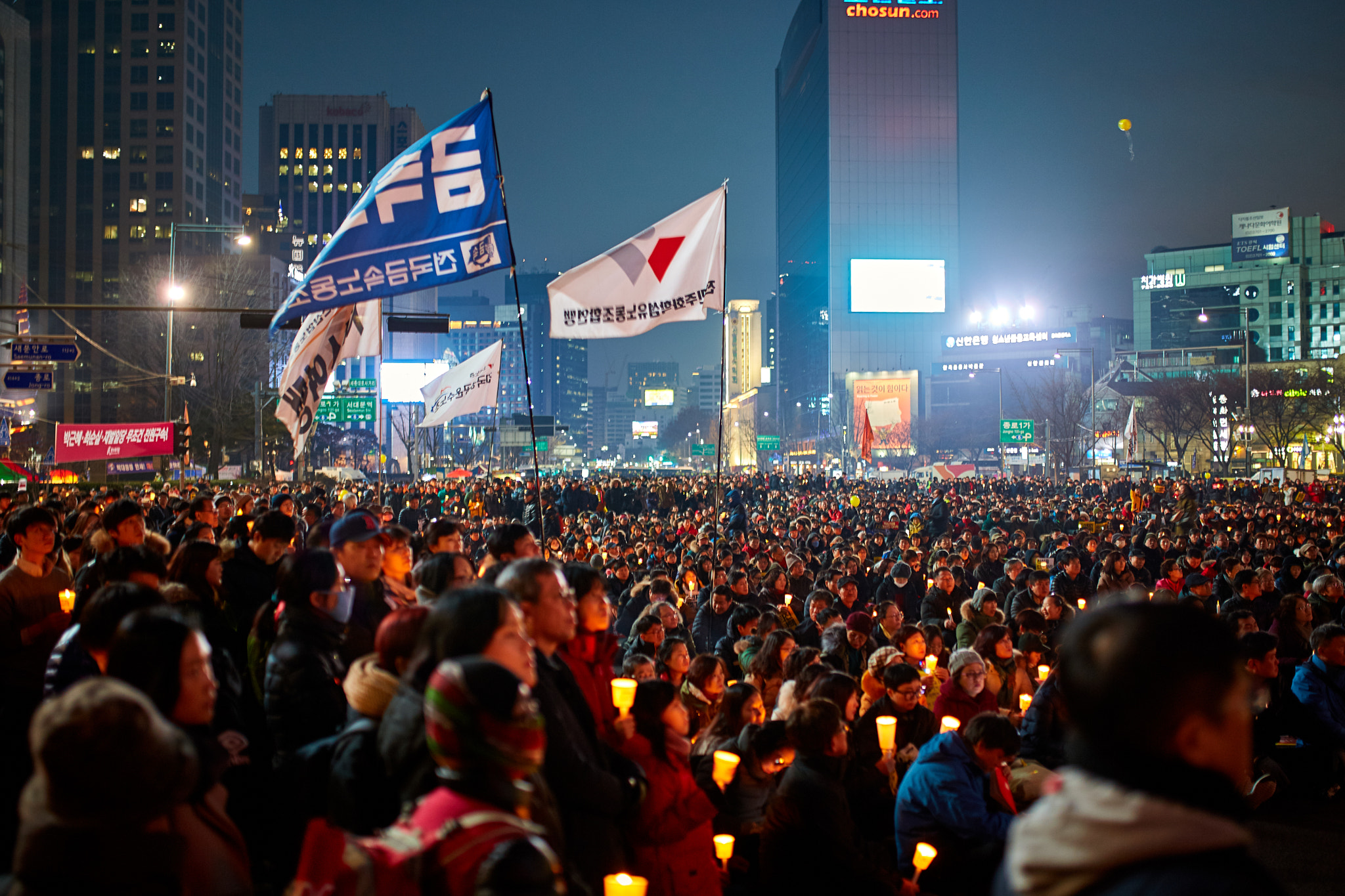
Candlelight protest against South Korean President Park Geun-hye in Seoul, South Korea, January 2017

Mobile telecommunications and radio broadcasting help to fight corruption, especially in developing regions like Africa, where other forms of communications are limited. In India, the anti-corruption bureau fights against corruption, and a new ombudsman bill called the Jan Lokpal Bill is being prepared. In the 1990s, initiatives were taken at an international level, in particular by the European Community, the Council of Europe, and the OECD, to put a ban on corruption. In 1996, the Committee of Ministers of the Council of Europe, for instance, adopted a comprehensive Programme of Action against Corruption and, subsequently, issued a series of anti-corruption standard-setting instruments:

- the Criminal Law Convention on Corruption (ETS 173);
- the Civil Law Convention on Corruption (ETS 174);
- the Additional Protocol to the Criminal Law Convention on Corruption (ETS 191);
- the Twenty Guiding Principles for the Fight against Corruption (Resolution (97) 24);
- the Recommendation on Codes of Conduct for Public Officials (Recommendation No. R (2000) 10);
- the Recommendation on Common Rules against Corruption in the Funding of Political Parties and Electoral Campaigns (Rec(2003)4)

The purpose of these instruments was to address the various forms of corruption (involving the public sector, the private sector, the financing of political activities, etc.), whether they had a strictly domestic or also a transnational dimension. To monitor the implementation at the national level of the requirements and principles provided in those texts, a monitoring mechanism – the Group of States Against Corruption (also known as GRECO) (French: Groupe d'Etats contre la corruption) – was created.

Further conventions were adopted at the regional level under the aegis of the Organization of American States (OAS or OEA), the African Union, and in 2003, at the universal level under that of the United Nations Convention against Corruption, where it is enabled with mutual legal assistance between the states parties regarding investigations, processes and judicial actions related to corruption crimes, as established in article 46.

== Whistleblowers ==
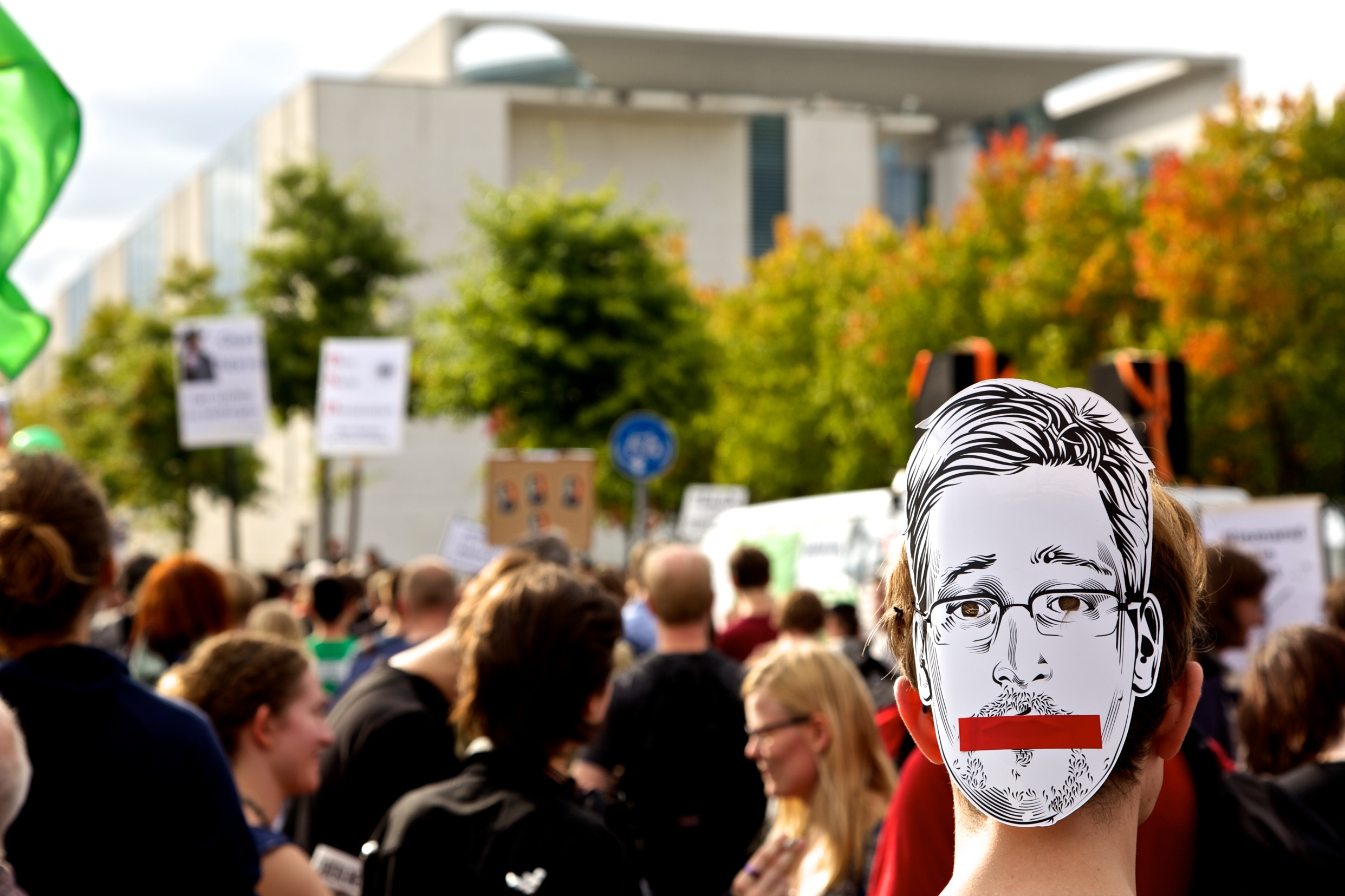
Protesters in support of American whistleblower Edward Snowden, Berlin, Germany, August 2014

A whistleblower is a person who exposes any kind of information or activity that is deemed illegal, unethical, or incorrect within an organization that is either private or public.

== Measuring corruption ==
Measuring corruption accurately is difficult if not impossible due to the illicit nature of the transaction and imprecise definitions of corruption. Few reliable measures of the magnitude of corruption exist and among those, there is a high level of heterogeneity. One of the most common ways to estimate corruption is through perception surveys. They have the advantage of good coverage; however, they do not measure corruption precisely.

While "corruption" indices first appeared in 1995 with the Corruption Perceptions Index (CPI), all of these metrics address different proxies for corruption, such as public perceptions of the extent of the problem. However, over time the refinement of methods and validation checks against objective indicators has meant that, while not perfect, many of these indicators are getting better at consistently and validly measuring the scale of corruption.

Transparency International, an anti-corruption NGO, pioneered this field with the CPI, first released in 1995. This work is often credited with breaking a taboo and forcing the issue of corruption into high-level development policy discourse. Transparency International publishes three measures, updated annually: a CPI (based on aggregating third-party polling of public perceptions of how corrupt different countries are); a Global Corruption Barometer (based on a survey of general public attitudes toward and experience of corruption); and a Bribe Payers Index, looking at the willingness of foreign firms to pay bribes.

The Corruption Perceptions Index is the best known of these metrics, though it has drawn much criticism and may be declining in influence. In 2013, Transparency International published a report on the "Government Defence Anti-corruption Index". This index evaluates the risk of corruption in countries' military sector.

The World Bank collects a range of data on corruption, including survey responses from over 100,000 firms worldwide and a set of indicators of governance and institutional quality. One of the six dimensions of governance measured by the Worldwide Governance Indicators is Control of Corruption, which is defined as "the extent to which power is exercised for private gain, including both petty and grand forms of corruption, as well as 'capture' of the state by elites and private interests."

While the definition itself is fairly precise, the data aggregated into the Worldwide Governance Indicators is based on any available polling: questions range from "is corruption a serious problem?" to measures of public access to information, and not consistent across countries. Despite these weaknesses, the global coverage of these datasets has led to their widespread adoption, most notably by the Millennium Challenge Corporation.

A number of parties have collected survey data, from the public and from experts, to try to gauge the level of corruption and bribery, as well as its impact on political and economic outcomes. A second wave of corruption metrics has been created by Global Integrity, the International Budget Partnership, and many lesser known local groups. These metrics include the Global Integrity Index, first published in 2004.

These second wave projects aim to create policy change by identifying resources more effectively and creating checklists toward incremental reform. Global Integrity and the International Budget Partnership each dispense with public surveys and instead uses in-country experts to evaluate "the opposite of corruption" – which Global Integrity defines as the public policies that prevent, discourage, or expose corruption. These approaches complement the first wave, awareness-raising tools by giving governments facing public outcry a checklist which measures concrete steps toward improved governance.

Typical second wave corruption metrics do not offer the worldwide coverage found in first wave projects and instead focus on localizing information gathered to specific problems and creating deep, "unpackable" content that matches quantitative and qualitative data. Alternative approaches, such as the British aid agency's Drivers of Change research, skips numbers and promotes understanding corruption via political economy analysis of who controls power in a given society. Another approach, suggested for when conventional measures of corruption are unavailable, is to look at the bodyfat of officials, after finding that obesity of cabinet ministers in post-Soviet states was highly correlated with more accurate measures.

== Institutions monitoring political corruption ==
- Financial Action Task Force
- Global Witness, an international NGO established in 1993 that works to break the links between natural resource exploitation, conflict, poverty, corruption, and human rights abuses worldwide
- Group of States Against Corruption, a body established under the Council of Europe to monitor the implementation of instruments adopted by member states to combat political corruption
- Independent Commission Against Corruption (disambiguation)
- International Anti-Corruption Academy
- Transparency International, a non-governmental organization that monitors and publicizes corporate and political corruption in international development and publishing annually the Corruption Perceptions Index

== In fiction ==
The following are some examples of works of fiction that portray political corruption in various forms:

- The Government Inspector – 1836 play by Nikolai Gogol
- Democracy – 1880 novel by Henry Adams
- The Financier – 1912 novel by Theodore Dreiser
- The Titan – 1914 novel by Theodore Dreiser, sequel to The Financier
- Washington Merry-Go-Round – 1932 film directed by James Cruze
- Mr. Smith Goes to Washington – 1939 film directed by Frank Capra
- Animal Farm – 1945 novel by George Orwell
- All the King's Men – 1946 novel by Robert Penn Warren
- Atlas Shrugged – 1957 novel by Ayn Rand
- Touch of Evil – 1958 film directed by Orson Welles
- House of Cards – 2013–2018 web television series created by Beau Willimon

== See also ==
- Big government
- Corruption
- Gerrymandering
- Government failure
- Influence peddling
- Insider trading
- Malfeasance in office
- Policy laundering
- Regulatory capture
