= Trilogy of Desire =

Series of three novels by Theodore Dreiser

- First combined edition
- Author: Theodore Dreiser
- Publisher: World Publishing
- Publication date: 1972
- Pages: 1,365
- ISBN: 978-0529046826

The Trilogy of Desire is a series of three novels by Theodore Dreiser:

- The Financier (1912)
- The Titan (1914)
- The Stoic (1947)

The protagonist of the trilogy, Frank Algernon Cowperwood, was modeled after financier Charles Yerkes. The novels narrate his rise and fall through an unscrupulous, self-centered quest for power and wealth.
