= Rub =

Rubbing is moving an object in contact with another object.

Rub, RUB, rubs or rubbing may also refer to:

== Arts and entertainment ==
- Rub (album), by Peaches, 2015
- Rubbing (art), a method of recording and reproducing the texture of a surface
- The Rub, an English rock band
- "Rubbin'", a song by Choclair from the 1999 album Ice Cold

== Organisations ==
- Ruhr University Bochum, in Germany
- Royal University of Bhutan

== People ==
- Christian Rub (1886–1956), Austrian-born American character actor
- Kurt Rub (born 1946), Swiss racing cyclist
- Timothy Rub (born 1952), American museum director and art historian

== Other uses ==
- Abrasion (mechanical), or rubbing away
- Spice rub, in cooking
- Date honey, or rub
- Russian ruble, ISO 4217 currency code RUB
- Kuliak languages, or Rub languages, in Uganda
- Gungu language, ISO 639 language code rub
- Rub, a professional wrestling term
- Ratio Utility Billing Systems (RUBS), a utility billing allocation method
- New South Wales RUB type carriage stock, a type of train carriage

== See also ==
- Alcohol rub (disambiguation)
- Rub out (disambiguation)
- Rub-a-dub-dub (disambiguation)
- "There's the rub", a phrase in "To be, or not to be" in Shakespeare's Hamlet
- Liniment, or heat rub, a medicated topical preparation
- Massage, the rubbing or kneading of the body's soft tissues
- NEDD8, a protein in Saccharomyces cerevisiae known as Rub1
- Rubredoxin A (RubA), a protein in oxygenic photoautotrophs
