= The Stoic =

Novel by Theodore Dreiser

- First edition
- Author: Theodore Dreiser
- Language: English
- Series: A Trilogy of Desire
- Publisher: Doubleday & Company
- Publication date: 1947
- Publication place: United States
- Preceded by: The Titan

The Stoic is a novel by Theodore Dreiser, written in 1945 and first published in 1947. It is the conclusion of his Trilogy of Desire, which includes The Financier (1912) and The Titan (1914). This series of novels depicts Frank Cowperwood, a businessman based on the real-life streetcar tycoon Charles Yerkes.

After many years of preparatory work, Dreiser commenced writing the third volume of his Cowperwood trilogy in April 1932. By August 1932 he had completed fifty-five chapters (representing about two-thirds of the work). But he then broke-off, until resuming in mid-1945. He completed a further thirty-four chapters plus an `epilogue` by October 1945. Having circulated the draft among friends and advisors, he decided to delete the epilogue and to rewrite the final chapter. He died before he could finish the manuscript, and his widow Helen assembled the novel's final pages. Helen also acquiesced to the novel being cut from 90 chapters of 921 pages to 78 chapters with 510 pages.

A number of Dreiser`s characters in The Stoic are based on persons associated with Yerkes during his London years. For example "Elverson Johnson" was based on Robert William Perks; and "Berenice Fleming" was based on Emilie Busbey Grigsby.

== Plot summary ==
Cowperwood, still married to his estranged wife Aileen, lives with Berenice. He decides to move to London, England, where he intends to take over and develop the underground railway system. Berenice becomes close to Earl Stane, while Frank has an affair with Lorna Maris, a relative of his. Meanwhile, he tries to fix Aileen up with Tollifer, but she becomes enraged when she finds out it was a ruse. Finally, Cowperwood dies of Bright's disease. His inheritance is squandered in lawsuits. Aileen dies shortly after. Berenice travels to India, where she is moved by poverty. Back in the United States, she realises there is poverty there too, and decides to set up a hospital for the poor, as Cowperwood intended.

== Cultural allusions ==
- Cowperwood is said to own paintings by William-Adolphe Bouguereau, Jean-Baptiste-Camille Corot, Rembrandt, Meindert Hobbema, Teniers, Jacob Isaakszoon van Ruisdael, Hans Holbein the Younger, Peter Paul Rubens, Anthony van Dyck, Reynolds, and J. M. W. Turner, among others.
