= Old Rogaum and His Theresa =

- Short story by Theodore Dreiser
- Country: United States
- Language: English
- Genre: Short story

Publication
- Published in: Reedy's Mirror
- Publication type: Periodical
- Media type: Print (Magazine)
- Publication date: December 12, 1901

"Old Rogaum and His Theresa" is a short story written by Theodore Dreiser. It was originally published in Reedy's Mirror on December 12, 1901 under the title of "Butcher Rogaum's Door." It subsequently appeared in the 1918 volume Free and Other Stories. With this short story, Dreiser begins to move from allegory to realism dealing with issues including sexual behavior, city life, immigrant struggles, and the conflicts between children and their parents.

== Plot summary ==
Rogaum is a German immigrant running a butcher shop in lower Manhattan, New York City. His daughter, Theresa, is almost eighteen. Attracted to the city lights and life she has taken to spending her time with her friend Myrtle. They secretly spend it with two boys, Connie and George, who are considered womanizers. Every night Rogaum calls Theresa home and reprimands her for being out so late.

She stays out later each night and Rogaum threatens to lock her out. One night he does, and refuses to let her in, intending to teach her a lesson. Instead of staying in the entrance all night, as expected, she goes back out with Connie.

Seeing Theresa leave by herself and not return, Roguam goes looking for her. Upon returning home without her, he finds a young woman lying at his door, who had drunk acid in order to kill herself. The police come, the girl is taken care of, and Rogaum and his wife tell them of their daughter’s disappearance. The police had seen her with Connie, which worries her father even more.

The two police officers, Maguire and Delahanty, investigate the woman's death, knowing she came from Adele's, a nearby whorehouse. They discover that she, too, had been locked out of her parents' house, starting her down that road.

The police find Theresa and Connie and take them to the station. Old Rogaum comes down to get her, enraged at Connie but delighted to have his daughter back.

== Character background ==
The characters in "Old Rogaum and His Theresa" are created in resemblance of Dreiser's family. John Paul Dreiser, Theodore Dreiser's father, was a German immigrant and the model for old Rogaum. Theresa's love of the city matches Theodore's love and experiences of a large city. The experience of Theresa going off with the young man Almerting is the same as Theodore's sisters', Sylvia and Emma, when they went off with some young men in Warsaw, Indiana. Even old Rogaum's threat of locking Theresa out was the same as John Paul threatening to lock out Emma and Sylvia.

== Major themes ==
A major theme in this story is the relationship between parents and their children, in a context of culture conflict between first and second generation immigrants.

Rogaum and his wife were immigrants from Germany, still speaking half in German and half in English. Roguam believed he should have control over his wife and his daughter, and he did. He wanted Theresa to marry a German boy from the Lutheran Church. Theresa was of another culture; she was from New York and spoke perfect English. She wasn’t scared of the streets at night or of the boys, she thought it was normal and wonderful to be out with them. She saw a different way of life than the one her father expected her to have. Even after Theresa is home safe with her parents, the issue between her and her parents about staying out later is not resolved.

Another major theme is as Theresa is growing older, she is feeling more sexual desires. In this story, it is shown the relationship she has with Connie Almerting and how it progresses. Also, during the few hours they spend together the night old Rogaum locks her out, the young Almerting is trying to convince Theresa to stay with him and act upon those sexual desires.

== Realism ==
This story is considered an example of realism in American literature. None of the events or characters in the story are romanticized. It shows the realistic relationships of a protective father and teenage daughter, the conflict that naturally occurs in that relationship. It realistically portrays the naïve girl who is trying to be good and the womanizing boy who is trying to get her to stay the night with him.

The story shows realism by showing how things really are, in an everyday occurrence, not how society wants it to be. Theresa does what she wants, following her desires, not what is expected of her. Roguam is not a perfect father, he shows flaws by not listening to his wife or his daughter, and punishing her harshly, but he reacts as a real father might react.

This story’s dialect contributes to its realism, as Dreiser interweaves German with English. Roguam and his wife, being German immigrants, speak partially in German, especially when emotional.

== Composition and publication ==
Encouraged by his friend Arthur Henry, Dreiser wrote four short stories in the summer of 1899, one of which is "Old Rogaum and His Theresa." These short stories officially began his career as a writer. "Butcher Rogaum's Door" was published in Reedy's Mirror in 1901.

In 1918, the title was changed to "Old Rogaum and His Theresa" and was published in Free and Other Stories. This newly published book was Dreiser's first volume of short stories, which also included the other three stories he had written during the summer of 1899.
