= Rub-a-dub-dub (disambiguation) =

Rub-a-dub-dub is a nursery rhyme.

Rub-a-dub-dub may also refer to:

- Rub-a-Dub-Dub (TV series), a 1984 animated series
- Rub-A-Dub-Dub (novel), by Robert Wringham
- "Rub-A-Dub-Dub" (Hank Thompson song)
- "Rub a Dub Dub", a song by The Equals

== See also ==
- Hey Rub-a-Dub-Dub, a collection of essays by Theodore Dreiser
- Rub-a-Dub-Tub, a 1983 children's television series
