= Rub out =

Rub out may refer to:

- use of an eraser
- Delete character, or rubout

== See also ==
- Rub (disambiguation)
- Homicide
  - Assassination
- Cancel (disambiguation)
- Massage
- Masturbation
- Polishing (metalworking)
