= Charles Yerkes =

American financier (1837–1905)

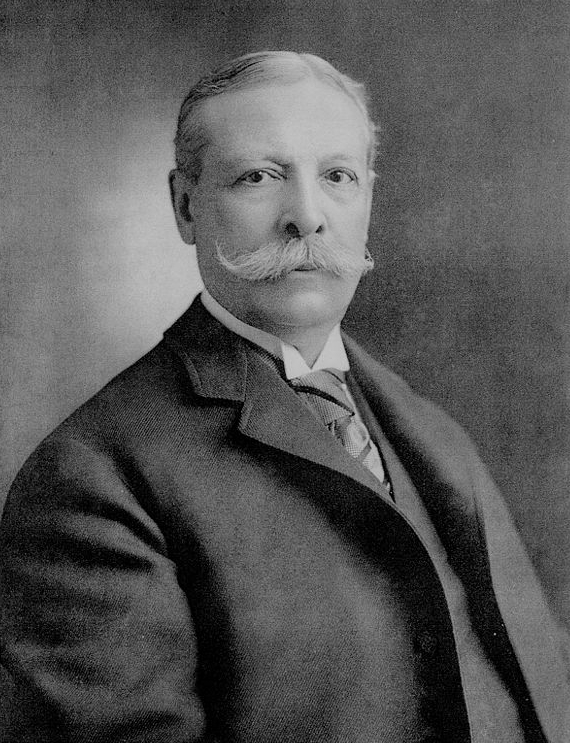
- Born: Charles Tyson Yerkes; June 25, 1837; Northern Liberties, Pennsylvania, U.S.
- Died: December 29, 1905 (aged 68); New York City, New York, U.S.
- Occupations: Entrepreneur and investor
- Known for: Urban transit finance
- Spouses: Susanna Guttridge Yerkes; Mary Adelaide Moore Yerkes
- Parent(s): Charles Tyson Yerkes Sr. and Elizabeth Link Yerkes

Signature
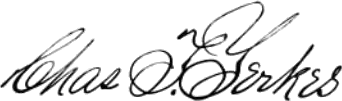

Charles Tyson Yerkes Jr. (/ˈjɜːrkiːz/ YUR-keez; June 25, 1837 – December 29, 1905) was an American financier. He played a part in developing mass-transit systems in Chicago and London.

== Philadelphia ==
Yerkes was born into a Quaker family in the Northern Liberties, a district adjacent to Philadelphia, on June 25, 1837. His mother, Elizabeth Link Yerkes, died of puerperal fever when he was five years old, and soon thereafter his father Charles Tyson Yerkes Sr. remarried a non-Quaker and was therefore expelled from the Society of Friends. After finishing a two-year course at Philadelphia's Central High School, Yerkes began his business career at the age of 17 as a clerk for a local grain brokerage. In 1859, aged 22, he began his own brokerage business and registered with the Philadelphia Stock Exchange.

By 1865, he had begun banking and specialized in selling municipal, state, and government bonds. Relying on his bank president father's associations, his political acquaintances, and his own acumen, Yerkes became well-known as a businessman. While serving as a financial agent for the City of Philadelphia's treasurer, Joseph F. Marcer, Yerkes risked public money in a large-scale stock speculation. This speculation ended calamitously when the Great Chicago Fire started a financial panic. Left insolvent and unable to make payment to the City of Philadelphia, Yerkes was convicted of larceny and sentenced to thirty-three months in Eastern State Penitentiary.

In an attempt to remain out of prison, he attempted to blackmail two influential Pennsylvania politicians. The blackmail plan initially failed; the damaging information concerning the politicians was eventually made public and politicians, including then-President Ulysses S. Grant, feared that the revelations might harm their prospects during the upcoming elections. Yerkes was promised a pardon if he would deny the accusations he had made. He agreed to these terms and was released after serving seven months in prison.

== Chicago ==
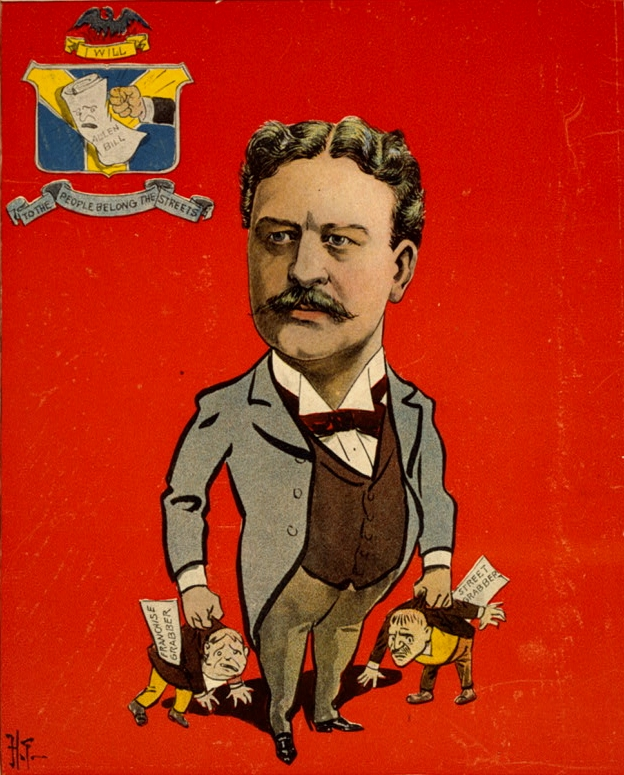
Caricature from 1899 showing Chicago mayor Carter Harrison IV fighting the "Allen bill", signed by Governor John Riley Tanner, that gave control of Chicago's intra-city transportation system to Yerkes

In 1881 Yerkes traveled to Fargo in the Dakota Territory to obtain a divorce from his wife. Later that year, he remarried and relocated to Chicago. There, he opened a stock and grain brokerage but soon became involved with planning the city's public transportation system. In 1886, Yerkes and his business partners used a complex financial deal to acquire control of the North Chicago Street Railway and then followed this with a series of further takeovers until he controlled a majority of Chicago's street railway systems on the north and west sides. Yerkes was not averse to using bribery and blackmail to obtain his objectives.

In an effort to improve his public reputation, Yerkes decided in 1892 to fund the world's largest telescope after being lobbied by the astronomer George Ellery Hale and University of Chicago president William Rainey Harper. He had intended initially to finance only a telescope but agreed eventually to fund an entire observatory. He contributed more than $500,000 to the University of Chicago to establish what would become known as Yerkes Observatory, located in Williams Bay, Wisconsin.

In 1895, Yerkes purchased the Republican partisan newspaper, the Chicago Inter Ocean, using the publication to publicize his political agenda.

Yerkes began a campaign for longer streetcar franchises in 1895, but Illinois governor John Peter Altgeld vetoed the franchise bills. Yerkes renewed the campaign in 1897, and, after a hard-fought struggle, secured from the Illinois Legislature a bill granting city councils the right to approve extended franchises. The so-called franchise war then shifted to the Chicago City Council — a venue in which Yerkes ordinarily thrived. A partially reformed council and Mayor Carter Harrison IV, however, ultimately defeated Yerkes, with the swing votes coming from aldermen "Hinky Dink" Kenna and "Bathhouse" John Coughlin.

In 1899, Yerkes sold the majority of his Chicago transport stocks and relocated to New York.

== Art collection ==
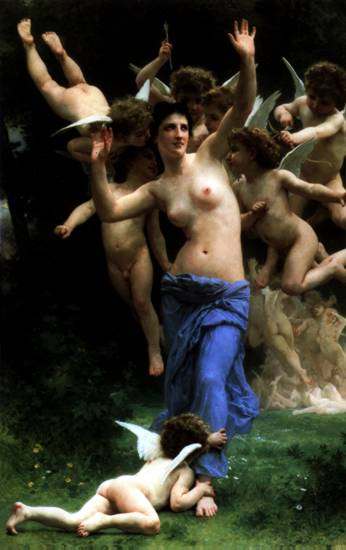
Bouguereau's 1892 painting Invading Cupid's Realm, purchased after the Columbian Exposition of 1893

While living in Chicago, Yerkes became an art collector, relying on Sarah Tyson Hallowell (1846–1924) to advise him for his purchases. After the Chicago World's Fair in 1893, she tried to interest him in the works of Auguste Rodin, which were part of the loan exhibition of French art. Because the subject matter was controversial, Yerkes initially refused the works, but he soon changed his mind and acquired two Rodin marbles, Cupid and Psyche and Orpheus, for his Chicago mansion, the first two of Rodin's works known to have been sold to an American collector. Yerkes' art collection also included paintings by Frans Hals, works by the French academic painters, such as Pygmalion and Galatea by Jean-Léon Gérôme and works by William-Adolphe Bouguereau and members of the Barbizon School. In 1904, he published a two volume catalog of his collection, which by that time was in New York:

- Catalogue of paintings and sculpture in the collection of Charles T. Yerkes, esq., New York, 1904

== London ==
In August 1900, Yerkes became involved with the development of the London underground railway system after riding along the route of one proposed line and surveying the city of London from the summit of Hampstead Heath. He established the Underground Electric Railways Company of London to take control of the District Railway and the partly built Baker Street and Waterloo Railway, Charing Cross, Euston and Hampstead Railway, and Great Northern, Piccadilly and Brompton Railway. Yerkes employed complex financial arrangements similar to those that he had used in the United States to raise the funds necessary to construct the new lines and electrify the District Railway (now known as the District line). In one of his last great triumphs, Yerkes managed to thwart an attempt by J. P. Morgan to become involved with the London underground railway. Yerkes did not live to see his London tube lines in operation. The now Bakerloo and Piccadilly lines opened in 1906, a few months after his death, and the Charing Cross line (now part of the Northern line) the summer of 1907.

== Death and legacy ==
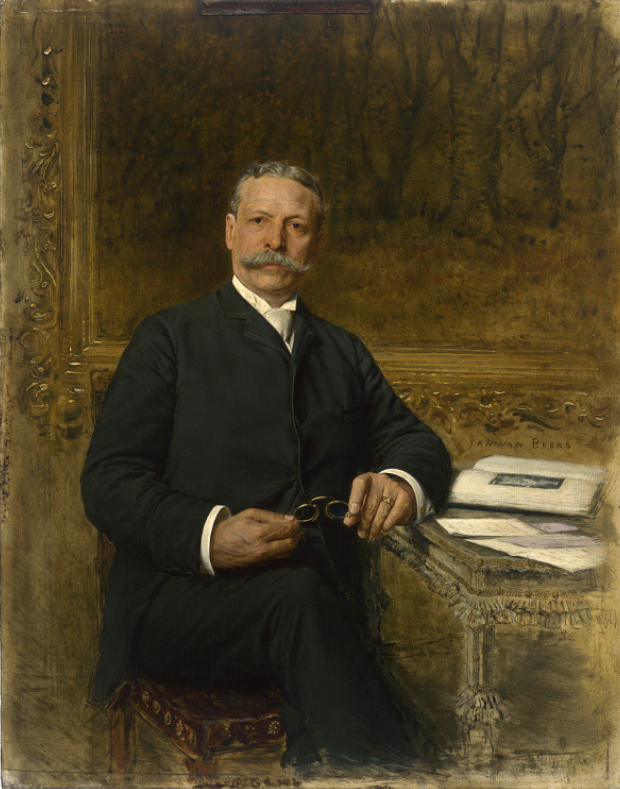
Charles Tyson Yerkes by Jan van Beers, c. 1893

Yerkes died in the hotel Waldorf Astoria in New York on December 29, 1905, of kidney disease. The events of Yerkes's life served as a model for Theodore Dreiser's novels The Financier, The Titan, and The Stoic, in which Yerkes was fictionalized as Frank Cowperwood.

The crater Yerkes on the Moon is named in his honor.

Pictures of Yerkes and his second wife Mary were painted by his favorite artist Jan van Beers (National Portrait Gallery, Washington, D.C.). His wife, the daughter of Thomas Moore of Philadelphia, was also painted in 1892 by the Swiss-born American artist Adolfo Müller-Ury (1862–1947). In 1893 Müller-Ury painted from miniatures portraits of Yerkes's Quaker grandparents, Mr. and Mrs. Silas Yerkes. In 1906, his widow Mary Adelaide married playwright and raconteur Wilson Mizner; they were divorced the next year.

Business positions
Preceded by (new position)	Chairman, Underground Electric Railways Company of London; 1902-1905	Succeeded by Sir Edgar Speyer
