= Alcohol rub =

Alcohol rub may refer to:

- Hand sanitizer
- Liniment or heat rub containing alcohol

== See also ==
- Rubbing alcohol, or surgical spirit
- "Ponme el alcolado, Juana", a song by Andy Montañez
- Witch-hazel
