= The Financier =

1912 novel by Theodore Dreiser

- First edition
- Author: Theodore Dreiser
- Language: English
- Series: A Trilogy of Desire
- Publisher: Harper & Brothers
- Publication date: 1912
- Publication place: United States
- Media type: Print (hardback & paperback)
- Followed by: The Titan

The Financier is a novel by Theodore Dreiser, based on real-life streetcar tycoon Charles Yerkes. Dreiser started writing his manuscript in 1911, and the following year published the first part of his lengthy work as The Financier. The second part appeared in 1914 as The Titan; the third volume of his Trilogy of Desire was also Dreiser's final novel, The Stoic (1947).

== Plot summary ==
In Philadelphia, Frank Cowperwood, whose father is a banker, makes his first money passing by an auction sale; he successfully bids for seven cases of Castile soap, which he sells to a grocer the same day with a profit of over 70 percent. Later, he gets a job in Henry Waterman & Company, and leaves it for Tighe & Company. He also marries an affluent widow, in spite of his young age. Over the years, he starts investing and misusing municipal funds with the aid of the City Treasurer, George Stener. In 1871, the Great Chicago Fire causes a stock market crash, prompting him to be bankrupt and exposed. He attempts to browbeat his way out of being sentenced to jail by intimidating Stener. However, politicians from the Republican Party, who themselves often stoop to bribery and misuse of city funds, use him as a scapegoat for their own corrupt practices. Meanwhile, he has an affair with Aileen Butler, the daughter of one of his business partners. She vows to wait for him after his jail sentence. Her father, Edward Butler dies, and she grows apart from her family.

== Allusions to actual history ==
- Henry Cowperwood is said to have no preference over abolitionism. Moreover, he is said to favor Nicholas Biddle and the United States Bank over Andrew Jackson. Other historical elements include John Brown, Abraham Lincoln, the First Battle of Bull Run, the Siege of Vicksburg, the Battle of Gettysburg, the Battle of the Wilderness, and J. Proctor Knott.
- Frank is said not to believe in Adam and Eve.
- Benjamin Franklin's theory of the electric eel is mentioned.
- Cyrus West Field, William H. Vanderbilt, Cornelius Vanderbilt, Jay Gould, Daniel Drew, Charles Crocker, and Collis P. Huntington are mentioned.
- Dreiser modeled the main character, Frank Cowperwood, on the tycoon Charles Yerkes.

== Allusions to other works ==
- Frank is said to own sculptures by Harriet Hosmer, Hiram Powers, Edward Clark Potter, and later Bertel Thorvaldsen.
- Lillian is described as someone from a painting by Dante Gabriel Rossetti or Edward Burne-Jones in Chapter XII. Later, Frank purchases paintings by William Morris Hunt, Thomas Sully, and William Hart. Upon the sale of his house, he is said to own paintings by Gilbert, Eastman Johnson, Édouard Detaille, Mariano Fortuny, George Inness Gobelin tapestry, sculptures by Antoine-Louis Barye
- Aileen likes to listen to Robert Schumann, Franz Schubert, Jacques Offenbach and Frédéric Chopin.
- In Chapter XXXVIII, Mrs Calligan's daughter is said to have read Charlotte Brontë's Jane Eyre, Edward Bulwer-Lytton, 1st Baron Lytton's Kenelm Chillingly, Ouida's Tricotrin, Amelia Edith Huddleston Barr's A Bow of Orange Ribbon.
- In the last chapter, William Shakespeare's Macbeth is mentioned.
