= Hey Rub-a-Dub-Dub =

1920 collection of twenty essays by Theodore Dreiser

Hey Rub-a-Dub-Dub: A Book of the Mystery and Wonder and Terror of Life
- First edition
- Author: Theodore Dreiser
- Language: English
- Genre: philosophy
- Publisher: Boni & Liveright
- Publication date: 1920
- Publication place: United States

Hey Rub-a-Dub-Dub: A Book of the Mystery and Wonder and Terror of Life is a collection of twenty essays by Theodore Dreiser.

== Contents ==
- "Hey Rub-a-Dub-Dub"
- "Change"
- "Some Aspects of Our National Character"
- "The Dream"
- "The American Financier"
- "The Toil of the Laborer"
- "Personality"
- "A Counsel to Perfection"
- "Neurotic America and the Sex Impulse"
- "Secrecy-Its Value"
- "Ideals, Morals, and the Daily Newspaper"
- "Equation Inevitable"
- "Phantasmagoria"
- "Ashtoreth"
- "The Reformer"
- "Marriage and Divorce"
- "More Democracy or Less? An Inquiry"
- "The Essential Tragedy of Life"
- "Life, Art and America"
- "The Court of Progress"

== Literary significance and criticism ==
Six essays and one play had already been published in newspapers prior to this collection.

Keith Newlin has argued that Hey Rub-a-Dub-Dub follows in the wake of Dreiser's attempts at philosophy, which he had started in his 1916 book called Plays of the Natural and Supernatural and ended with Notes on Life, published posthumously in 1974.

The collection was castigated by reviewers from the New York Evening Post, the Chicago News and The New Republic, though Dreiser held it in high regard. Carl Van Doren pointed out Dreiser's inability to sustain his arguments. H.L. Mencken lampooned it.

The book draws upon Jacques Loeb's The Mechanistic Conception of Life (1912).
