= The Titan (novel) =

1914 novel by Theodore Dreiser

- First edition
- Author: Theodore Dreiser
- Language: English
- Series: A Trilogy of Desire
- Publisher: John Lane
- Publication date: 1914
- Publication place: United States
- Media type: Print (hardback & paperback)
- Preceded by: The Financier
- Followed by: The Stoic

The Titan is a novel by Theodore Dreiser, completed in 1914 as a sequel to his 1912 novel The Financier. Both books were originally a single manuscript, but the narrative's length required splitting it into two separate novels. Dreiser's manuscript of The Titan was rejected by Harper & Brothers, publisher of The Financier, due to its uncompromising realism; John Lane published the book in 1914. The Titan is the second part of Dreiser's Trilogy of Desire, a saga of ruthless businessman Frank Cowperwood (modeled after real-life streetcar tycoon Charles Yerkes). The third part of the trilogy, The Stoic, was Dreiser's final novel, published in 1947 after his death.

== Plot summary ==
After his release from prison, Frank Cowperwood invests in stocks subsequent to the Panic of 1873, and becomes a millionaire again. He decides to move out of Philadelphia and start a new life in the West. He moves to Chicago with Aileen and his attorney is finally able to persuade Lillian to agree to a divorce. Frank decides to take over the street-railway system. He bankrupts several opponents with the help of John J. McKenty and other political allies. Meanwhile, Chicago society finds out about his past in Philadelphia and the couple are no longer invited to dinner parties; after a while, the press turns on him too. Cowperwood is unfaithful many times. Aileen finds out about a certain Rita and beats her up. She gives up on him and has an affair with Polk Lynde, a man of privilege; she eventually loses faith in him. Meanwhile, Cowperwood meets young Berenice Fleming; by the end of the novel, he tells her he loves her and she consents to live with him. However, the ending is bittersweet as Cowperwood has not managed to obtain the fifty-year franchise for his railway schemes that he wanted.

== Allusions to other works ==
- Allusions to other works include Ishmael, Caesar, Euripides, Ralph Waldo Emerson, Henry David Thoreau, John Milton's Masque of Comus, William Shakespeare's Romeo and Juliet and Macbeth, Molière's Les Femmes Savantes, Richard Brinsley Sheridan's The Rivals, Sophocles's Electra, Robert Browning's The Ring and the Book, John Keats's The Eve of St. Agnes, and Cellini's autobiography.
- Cowperwood collects paintings; some painters mentioned include Lord Leighton, Gabriel Rossetti, James Abbott McNeill Whistler, Henry Raeburn, Jean-François Millet, Jan Steen, Jean-Louis-Ernest Meissonier, and Jean-Léon Gérôme.
- In Chapter XXIX, Florence Cochrane is said to read Christopher Marlowe and Ben Jonson.
- In Chapter LI, Braxmar says he has read George du Maurier's Trilby.
- Music is mentioned with Sarah Bernhardt, Tchaikovsky's Francesca da Rimini, and Puccini.
- Greek mythology is also mentioned with Chaldea, Circe, Helen, Troy, and Andromache.

== Allusions to actual history ==
- Historical allusions include Andrew Jackson, Henry Clay, Davy Crockett, the Haymarket affair, Henry George, and Robert Owen.
