= Theodore Dreiser =

American novelist and journalist (1871–1945)

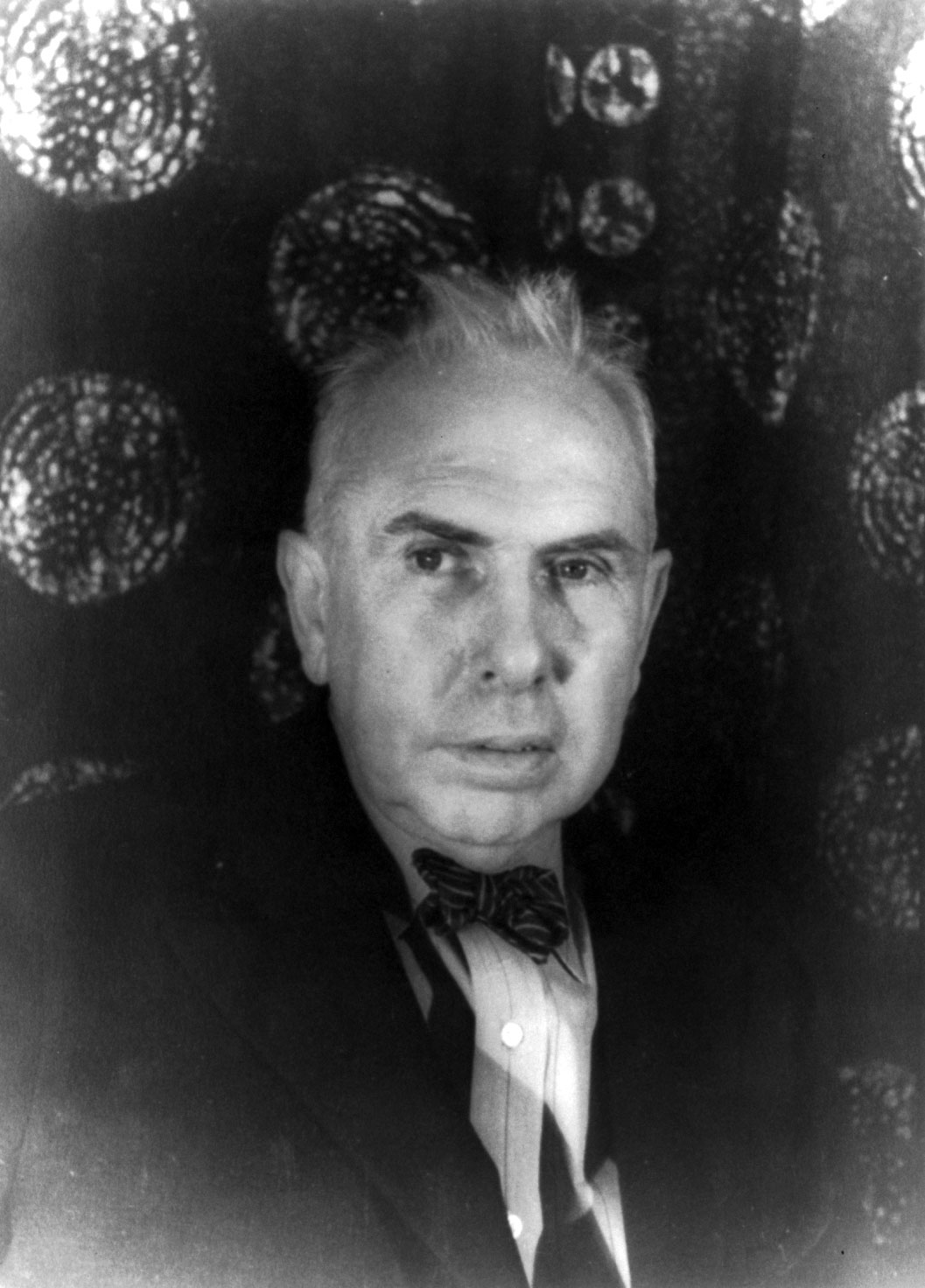
- Theodore Dreiser, photographed by Carl Van Vechten, 1933
- Born: Theodore Herman Albert Dreiser; August 27, 1871; Terre Haute, Indiana, U.S.
- Died: December 28, 1945 (aged 74); Hollywood, Los Angeles, California, U.S.
- Occupation: Novelist
- Movement: Social realism, naturalism
- Spouses: Sara Osborne White (m. 1898; sep. 1909) Helen Patges Richardson (m. 1944)
- Relatives: Paul Dresser (brother)

Theodore Herman Albert Dreiser (/ˈdraɪsər, -zər/; August 27, 1871 – December 28, 1945) was an American novelist and journalist of the naturalist school. His novels often featured main characters who succeeded at their objectives despite a lack of a firm moral code, and literary situations that more closely resemble studies of nature than tales of choice and agency. Dreiser's best-known novels include Sister Carrie (1900) and An American Tragedy (1925).

== Early life ==
Dreiser was born in Terre Haute, Indiana, to John Paul Dreiser and Sarah Maria (née Schanab). John Dreiser was a German immigrant from Mayen in the Rhine Province of Prussia, and Sarah was from the Mennonite farming community near Dayton, Ohio. Her family disowned her for converting to Roman Catholicism in order to marry John Dreiser. Theodore was the twelfth of thirteen children (the ninth of the ten surviving). Paul Dresser (1858–1906) was one of his older brothers; Paul changed the spelling of his name as he became a popular songwriter. They were raised as Catholics.

According to Daniels, Dreiser's childhood was characterized by severe poverty. His father could be harsh. His later fiction reflects these experiences.

After graduating from high school in Warsaw, Indiana, Dreiser attended Indiana University Bloomington in 1889–1890 without taking a degree.

== Career ==
=== Journalism ===
In 1892, Dreiser started work as a reporter and drama critic for newspapers in Chicago, St. Louis, Toledo, Pittsburgh and New York. During this period he published his first work of fiction, The Return of Genius, which appeared in the Chicago Daily Globe under the name Carl Dreiser. By 1895 he was writing articles for magazines. He authored articles on writers such as Nathaniel Hawthorne, William Dean Howells, Israel Zangwill, and John Burroughs and interviewed public figures such as Andrew Carnegie, Marshall Field, Thomas Edison, and Theodore Thomas. His other interviewees included Lillian Nordica, Emilia E. Barr, Philip Armour, and Alfred Stieglitz.

In 1895, Dreiser convinced business associates of his songwriter brother Paul to give him the editorship of a magazine called Ev'ry Month, in which he published his first story, "Forgotten" a tale based on a song of his brother's titled "The Letter That Never Came". Dreiser continued editing magazines, becoming editor of the women's magazine The Delineator in June 1907. As Daniels noted, he thereby began to achieve financial independence.

=== Literary career ===
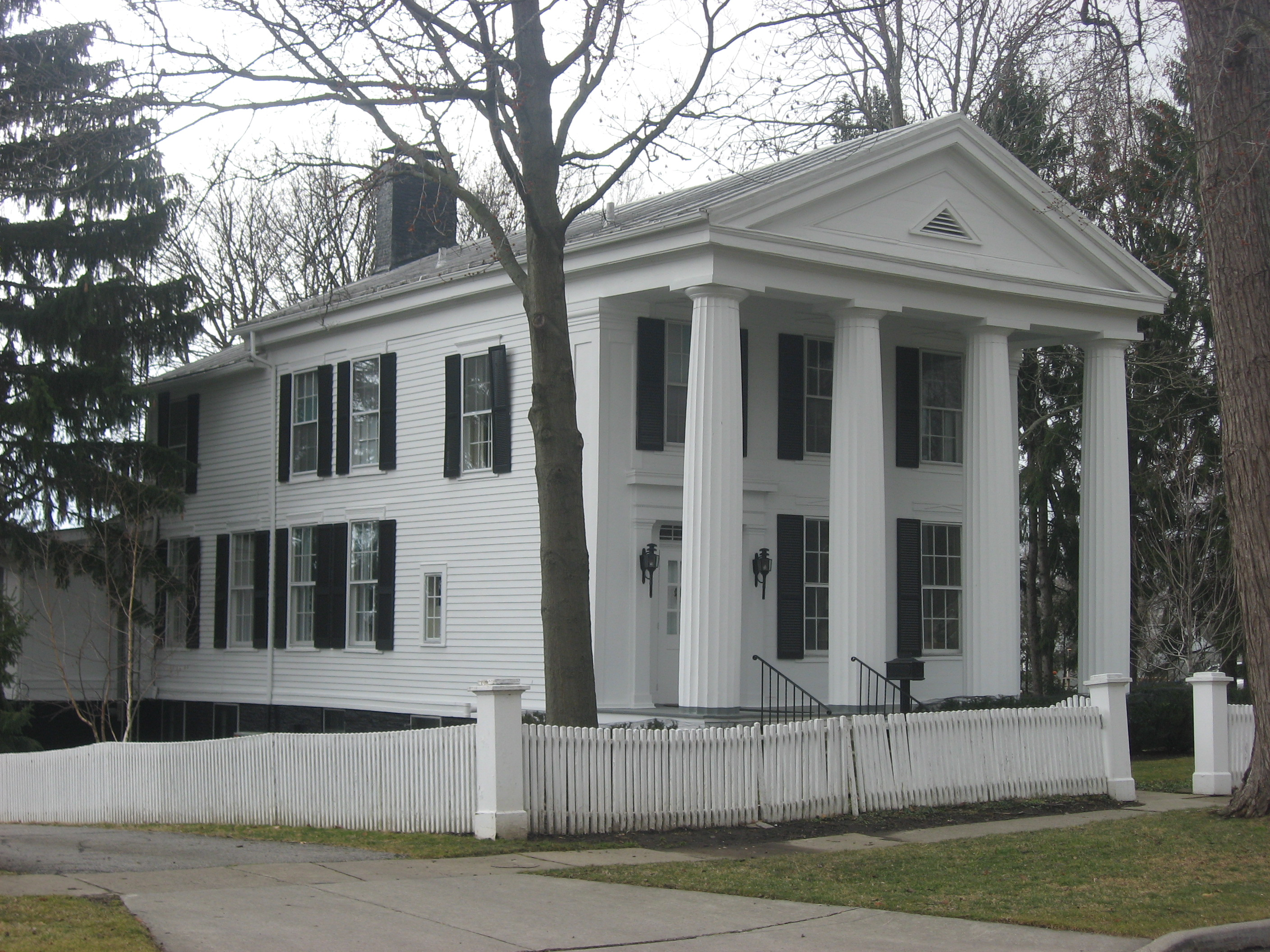
House of Four Pillars

During 1899, Dreiser and his first wife Sara stayed with Arthur Henry and his wife Maude Wood Henry at the House of Four Pillars, an 1830s Greek Revival house in Maumee, Ohio. There Dreiser began work on his first novel, Sister Carrie, published in 1900. Unknown to Maude, Arthur sold a half-interest in the house to Dreiser to finance a move to New York without her.

In Sister Carrie, Dreiser portrayed a changing society, writing about a young woman who flees rural life for the city (Chicago), fails to find work that pays a living wage, falls prey to several men, and ultimately achieves fame as an actress. The novel sold poorly and was considered controversial because it featured a country girl who pursues her dreams of fame and fortune through relationships with men. The book has acquired a considerable reputation. It has been called by Donald L. Miller the "greatest of all American urban novels."

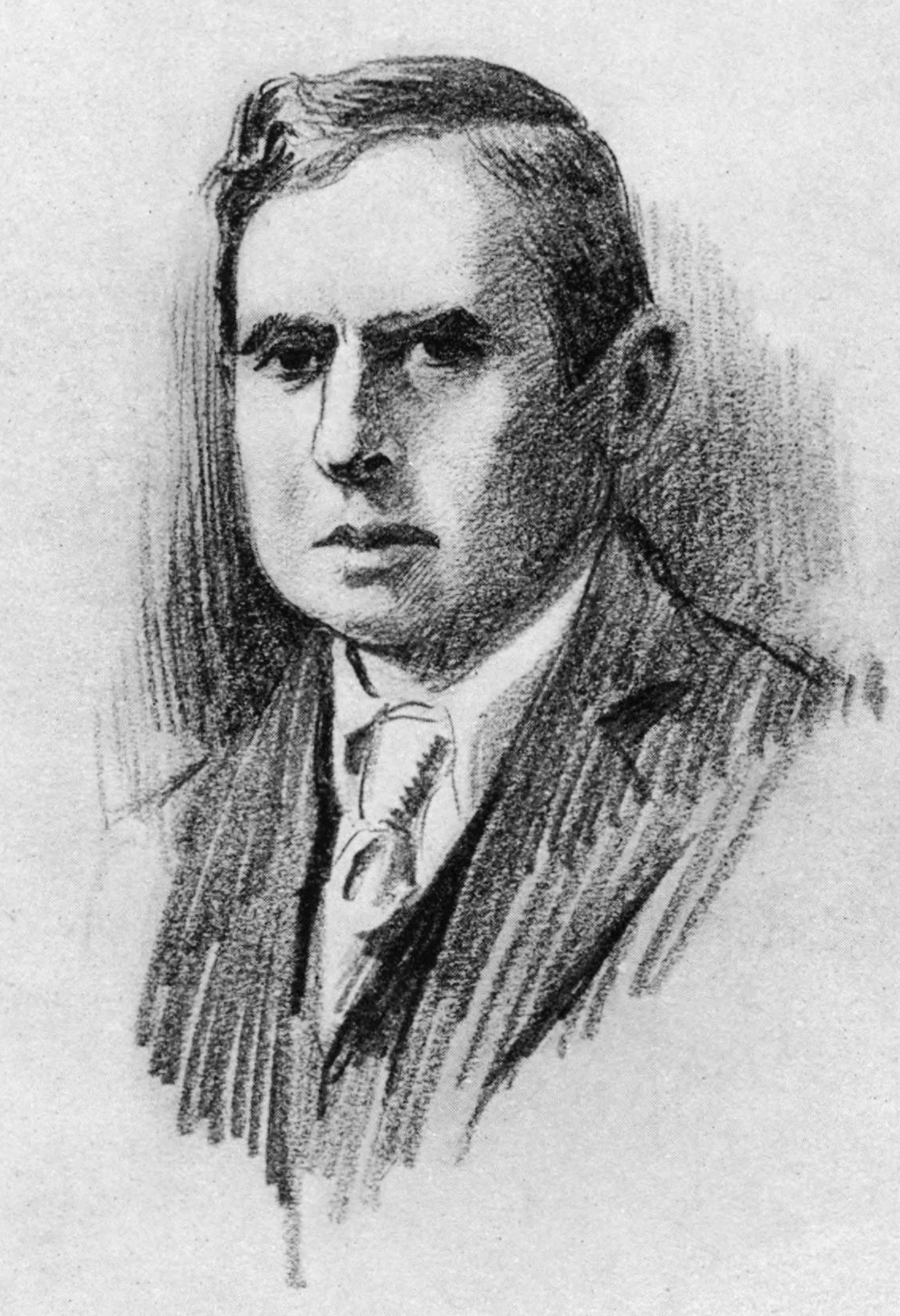
Dreiser c. 1910s

In 1901 Dreiser's short story "Nigger Jeff" was published in Ainslee's Magazine. It was based on a lynching he witnessed in 1893. Dreiser's short story "Old Rogaum and His Theresa" was originally published in 1901.

His second novel Jennie Gerhardt was published in 1911. Dreiser's portrayals of young women as protagonists dramatized the social changes of urbanization, as young people moved from rural villages to cities.

Dreiser's first commercial success was An American Tragedy, published in 1925. From 1892, when Dreiser began work as a newspaperman, he had begun

to observe a certain type of crime in the United States that proved very common. It seemed to spring from the fact that almost every young person was possessed of an ingrown ambition to be somebody financially and socially. Fortune hunting became a disease with the frequent result of a peculiarly American kind of crime, a form of "murder for money", when "the young ambitious lover of some poorer girl" found "a more attractive girl with money or position" but could not get rid of the first girl, usually because of pregnancy.

Dreiser claimed to have collected such stories every year between 1895 and 1935. He based his novel on details and the setting of the 1906 murder of Grace Brown by Chester Gillette in upstate New York, a crime that attracted widespread attention from newspapers. While the novel sold well, it also was criticized for its portrayal of a man without morals who commits a sordid murder.

Though known primarily as a novelist, Dreiser also wrote short stories, publishing his first collection of 11, entitled, Free and Other Stories in 1918.

His story "My Brother Paul" was a biography of his older brother Paul Dresser, who became a famous songwriter in the 1890s. This story formed the basis for the 1942 romantic movie My Gal Sal.

Dreiser also wrote poetry. His poem "The Aspirant" (1929) continues his theme of poverty and ambition: a young man in a shabbily furnished room describes his own and the other tenants' dreams, and asks "why? why?" The poem appeared in The Poetry Quartos, collected and printed by Paul Johnston, and published by Random House in 1929.

Other works include Trilogy of Desire, based on the life of Charles Tyson Yerkes (1837–1905), who became a Chicago streetcar tycoon. It is composed of The Financier (1912), The Titan (1914), and The Stoic. The last was published posthumously in 1947.

Dreiser often was forced to battle against censorship because his depiction of some aspects of life, such as sexual promiscuity, offended authorities and challenged popular standards of acceptable opinion. In 1930 he was nominated for the Nobel Prize in Literature by Swedish author Anders Österling, but was passed over by the Nobel Committee in favor of Sinclair Lewis.

=== Political commitment ===
Politically, Dreiser was involved in several campaigns defending radicals he believed victims of social injustice. These included the lynching of Frank Little, one of the leaders of the Industrial Workers of the World, the Sacco and Vanzetti case, the deportation of Emma Goldman, and the conviction of the trade union leader Thomas Mooney. In November 1931, Dreiser led the National Committee for the Defense of Political Prisoners (NCDPP) to the coalfields of southeastern Kentucky to take testimony from miners in Pineville and Harlan on the pattern of violence against the miners and their unions by the coal operators. The pattern of violence was known as the Harlan County War.

Dreiser was a committed socialist and wrote several nonfiction books on political issues. These included Dreiser Looks at Russia (1928), the result of his 1927 trip to the Soviet Union, and two books presenting a critical perspective on capitalist America, Tragic America (1931) and America Is Worth Saving (1941). He praised the Soviet Union under Joseph Stalin during the Great Terror and the non-aggression pact with Adolf Hitler. Dreiser joined the Communist Party USA in August 1945 and later became the honorary president of the League of American Writers. Although less politically radical friends, such as H. L. Mencken, spoke of Dreiser's relationship with communism as an "unimportant detail in his life", Dreiser's biographer Jerome Loving notes that his political activities since the early 1930s had "clearly been in concert with ostensible communist aims with regard to the working class."

== Personal life ==
Dreiser's appearance and personality were described by Edgar Lee Masters in a poem, Theodore Dreiser: A Portrait, published in The New York Times Review of Books.

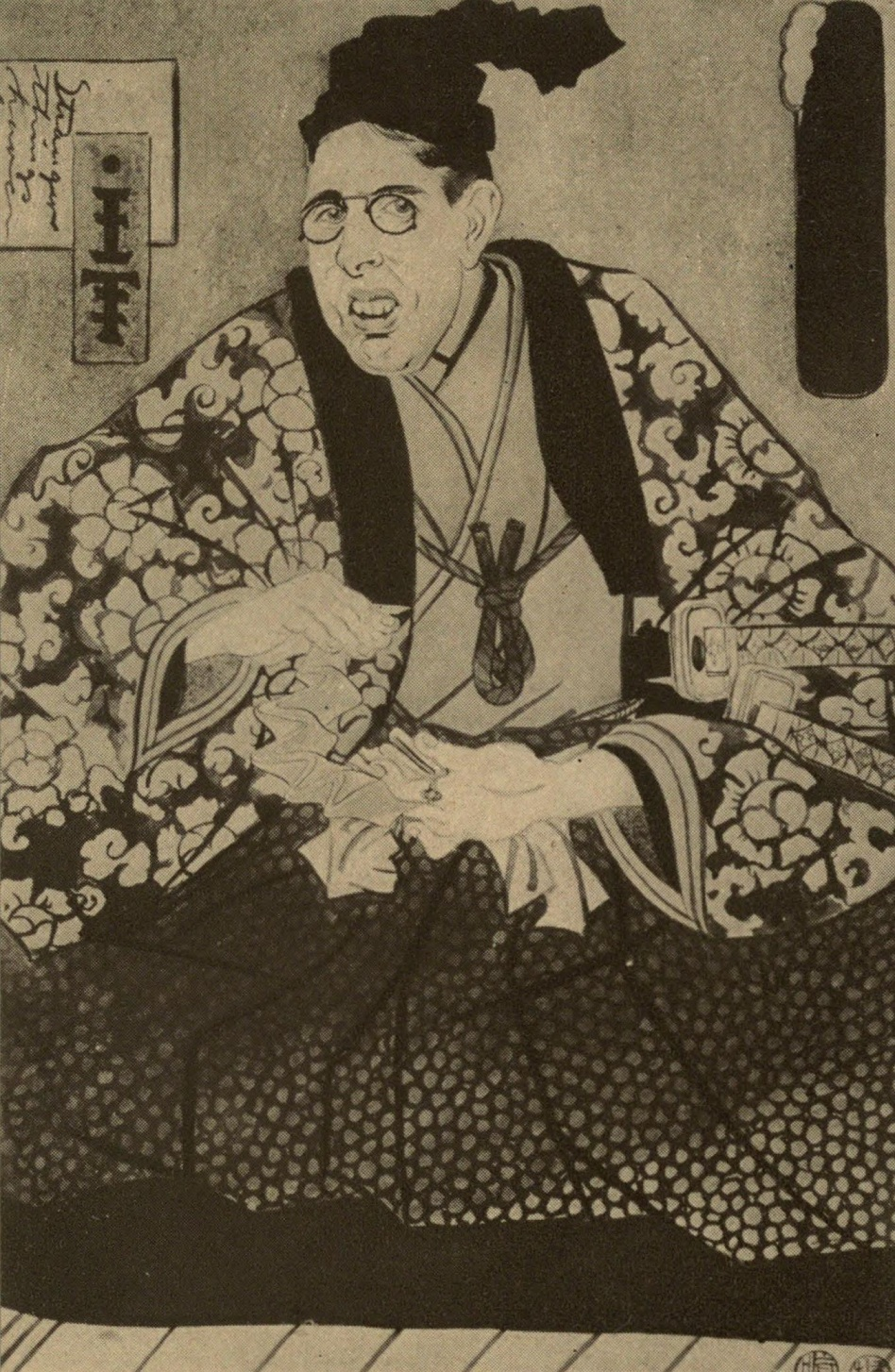
Caricature of Dreiser, 1917

While working as a newspaperman in St. Louis, Dreiser met schoolteacher Sara Osborne White. They became engaged in 1893 and married on December 28, 1898. They separated in 1909, partly due to Dreiser's infatuation with Thelma Cudlipp, the teenage daughter of a colleague, but were never formally divorced.

In 1913, he began a romantic relationship with the actress and painter Kyra Markham. In 1919, Dreiser met his cousin Helen Patges Richardson (1894–1955) with whom he began an affair. Through the following decades, she remained the constant woman in his life, even through many more temporary love affairs (such as one with his secretary Clara Jaeger in the 1930s). Helen tolerated Dreiser's affairs, and they remained together until his death. Dreiser and Helen married on June 13, 1944, his first wife Sara having died in 1942.

Dreiser planned to return from his first European vacation on the Titanic, but was talked out of it by an English publisher who recommended he board a cheaper ship.

Dreiser was an atheist.

== Legacy ==
=== Literature ===
Dreiser had an enormous influence on the generation that followed his. In his tribute "Dreiser" from Horses and Men (1923), Sherwood Anderson writes (almost repeated 1916 article):

Heavy, heavy, the feet of Theodore. How easy to pick some of his books to pieces, to laugh at him for so much of his heavy prose ... [T]he fellows of the ink-pots, the prose writers in America who follow Dreiser, will have much to do that he has never done. Their road is long but, because of him, those who follow will never have to face the road through the wilderness of Puritan denial, the road that Dreiser faced alone.

Alfred Kazin characterized Dreiser as "stronger than all the others of his time, and at the same time more poignant; greater than the world he has described, but as significant as the people in it," while Larzer Ziff (UC Berkeley) remarked that Dreiser "succeeded beyond any of his predecessors or successors in producing a great American business novel."

Renowned mid-century literary critic Irving Howe spoke of Dreiser as ranking "among the American giants, the very few American giants we have had." A British view of Dreiser came from the publisher Rupert Hart-Davis: "Theodore Dreiser's books are enough to stop me in my tracks, never mind his letters—that slovenly turgid style describing endless business deals, with a seduction every hundred pages as light relief. If he's the great American novelist, give me the Marx Brothers every time." The literary scholar F. R. Leavis wrote that Dreiser "seems as though he learned English from a newspaper. He gives the feeling that he doesn't have any native language".

One of Dreiser's strongest champions during his lifetime, H. L. Mencken, declared "that he is a great artist, and that no other American of his generation left so wide and handsome a mark upon the national letters. American writing, before and after his time, differed almost as much as biology before and after Darwin. He was a man of large originality, of profound feeling, and of unshakable courage. All of us who write are better off because he lived, worked, and hoped."

Dreiser's great theme was the tremendous tensions that can arise among ambition, desire, and social mores.

=== Academia ===
Dreiser Hall, erected 1950 on the Indiana State University campus in Terre Haute, Indiana, houses the university's Communications Programs, Student Media (WISU), Sycamore Video and "The Sycamore" (annual yearbook), classroom and lecture space as well as a 255-seat proscenium theater. It was named for Dreiser in 1966.

Dreiser College, at Stony Brook University located in Stony Brook, New York, is also named after him.

In 2011, Dreiser was inducted into the Chicago Literary Hall of Fame.

== Works ==
=== Fiction ===
- Sister Carrie (1900)
- Jennie Gerhardt (1911)
- The Financier (1912)
- The Titan (1914)
- The "Genius" (1915)
- Free and Other Stories (1918)
- An American Tragedy (1925)
- Chains: Lesser Novels and Stories (1927)
- The Bulwark (1946)
- The Stoic (1947)

=== Drama ===
- Plays of the Natural and the Supernatural (1916)
- The Hand of the Potter (1918), first produced 1921

=== Poetry ===
- Moods: Cadenced and Declaimed (New York: Boni & Liveright, 1926), 127 poems in a strictly limited edition of 550 numbered copies signed by the author, of which 535 were for sale; revised and enlarged as Moods: Philosophical and Emotional (Cadenced and Declaimed) (New York: Simon & Schuster, 1935)

=== Nonfiction ===
- The Camera Club of New York. Ainslee's. Volume 4, pages 325–335 (1899)
- A Traveler at Forty (1913)
- A Hoosier Holiday (New York: John Lane Company, 1916)
- Twelve Men (New York: Boni & Liveright, 1919)
- Hey Rub-a-Dub-Dub: A Book of the Mystery and Wonder and Terror of Life (New York: Boni & Liveright, 1920)
- A Book About Myself (1922); republished (unexpurgated) as Newspaper Days (New York: Horace Liveright, 1931)
- The Color of a Great City (New York: Boni & Liveright, 1923)
- Dreiser Looks at Russia (New York: Horace Liveright, 1928)
- My City (1929)
- A Gallery of Women (1929)
- Tragic America (New York: Horace Liveright, 1931)
- Dawn (New York: Horace Liveright, 1931)
- America Is Worth Saving (New York: Modern Age Books, 1941)
- Notes on Life, edited by Marguerite Tjader and John J. McAleer (University of Alabama Press; 1974)
- An Amateur Laborer, edited with an Introduction by Richard W. Dowell (University of Pennsylvania Press; 1983) 207 pages
- Theodore Dreiser: Political Writings, edited by Jude Davies (University of Illinois Press; 2011) 321 pages

== Additional reading ==
- Cassuto, Leonard and Clare Virginia Eby, eds. The Cambridge Companion to Theodore Dreiser. Cambridge: Cambridge University Press, 2004.
- Loving, Jerome. The Last Titan: A Life of Theodore Dreiser. Berkeley: University of California Press, 2005.
- Riggio Tom and Morgan, Speer, The Total Stranger. The Missouri Review 10.3 (1987): pages 97–107.
