= Jari =

Jari may refer to:

== Finnish male given name ==
The name Jari derives from the Finnish name Jalmari, which in turn derives from the Old Norse male name Hjalmar or Hjálmarr (hjalmr 'helmet' + arr 'warrior/army'). With the influence of Finnish footballer Jari Litmanen, there are also over 2,000 people named Jari in the Netherlands and Belgium.

Notable people with the name Jari include:

- Jari Aarnio, Finnish former head of police and convicted felon
- Jari De Busser, Belgian footballer
- Jari Elsilä, Finnish cartoon drawer
- Jari Europaeus, Finnish football player and manager
- Jari Grönstrand, Finnish ice hockey player
- Jari Haapalainen, Finnish-Swedish musician
- Jari Halonen, Finnish film and theatre director and actor
- Jari Hanska, Finnish journalist and writer
- Jari Helle, Finnish ice hockey player
- Jari Hudd, Finnish footballer
- Jari Huttunen, Finnish WRC rally driver
- Jari Ilola, Finnish footballer
- Jari Isometsä, Finnish cross-country skier
- Jari Jolkkonen, Finnish prelate
- Jari Jones, American actress and producer
- Jari Jäväjä, Finnish footballer
- Jari Jääskeläinen, Finnish ice hockey player
- Jari Kainulainen, Finnish power metal bass guitarist
- Jari Kessler, Croatian-Italian figure skater
- Jari Ketomaa, Finnish rally driver
- Jari Kirkland, American ski mountaineer
- Jari Koenraat, Dutch footballer
- Jari Korpisalo, Finnish ice hockey player
- Jari Koskela, Finnish politician
- Jari Kuosma, Finnish wingsuit flyer
- Jari Kurri, Finnish ice hockey player
- Jari Laukkanen (disambiguation)
- Jari Leppä, Finnish politician and former Minister of Agriculture
- Jari Levonen, Finnish ice hockey referee
- Jari Lindroos, Finnish ice hockey player
- Jari Litmanen, Finnish football player
- Jari Lipponen, Finnish archer
- Jari Lähde‚ Finnish racing cyclist
- Jari Mantila, Finnish nordic combine athlete
- Jari Myllykoski, Finnish politician
- Jari Mäenpää, Finnish heavy metal musician
- Jari Naranen, Finnish paralympic athlete
- Jari Neugebauer, German ice hockey player
- Jari Niemi, Finnish football player
- Jari Niinimäki, Finnish footballer
- Jari Nikkilä, Finnish footballer
- Jari Nurminen, Finnish racing driver
- Jari Oosterwijk, Dutch footballer
- Jari Porttila, Finnish sports journalist and reporter
- Jari Poutiainen, Finnish footballer
- Jari Puikkonen, Finnish skijumper
- Jari Pyykölä, Finnish football manager
- Jari Pälve, Finnish sports shooter
- Jari Rantanen, Finnish football player
- Jari Rouvinen, Finnish curler
- Jari Räsänen, Finnish cross-country skier
- Jari Rinne, Finnish football player
- Jari Sara, Finnish footballer
- Jari Sarasvuo, Finnish entrepreneur, motivational speaker and television presenter
- Jari Sailio, Finnish ice hockey player
- Jari Schuurman, Dutch footballer
- Jari Sillanpää, Finnish singer
- Jari Tervo, Finnish author
- Jari Tolsa, Swedish-Finnish ice hockey player
- Jari Torkki, Finnish ice hockey player
- Jari Vandeputte, Belgian footballer
- Jari Vanhala, Finnish footballer
- Jari Verstraeten, Belgian road bicycle racer
- Jari Vilén, Finnish diplomat and politician
- Jari Viuhkola, Finnish ice hockey player
- Jari Vlak, Dutch footballer
- Jari-Matti Latvala Finnish rally driver
- Jari-Pekka Keurulainen, Finnish football manager, coach and physioteherapist

== Other ==
- Jari gan, genre of music in Bengal
- Jari (dwarf), Norse dwarf
- Jari, Rio Grande do Sul, city in Brazil
- Jari, Iran (disambiguation)
- Jari River, a northern tributary of the Amazon river on the border between the states of Pará and Amapá in Brazil
- Jari River (Purus River), a tributary to the Rio Purus, which itself is a major tributary to the Amazon River
- JARI, the Japan Automobile Research Institute
- JARI, the Johnstown Area Regional Industries (JARI)
- Zari, or jari, metallic thread used in South Asian brocade
- Albert Ekka (Jari) block, a community development block in Jharkhand, India
  - Jari, Gumla, a village in Jharkhand India
- JARI USV, Chinese unmanned surface vehicle

== See also ==
- Jary (disambiguation)
- Jarry (disambiguation)
