= Laukkanen =

Laukkanen is a Finnish surname. Notable people with the surname include:

- Antero Laukkanen (1958–2024), Finnish priest and politician
- Janne Laukkanen (born 1970), Finnish former professional ice hockey player
- Jari Laukkanen (disambiguation), multiple people
- Jenna Laukkanen (born 1995), Finnish swimmer
- Juha Laukkanen (born 1969), former Finnish javelin thrower
- Kai Laukkanen (born 1975), Finnish motorcycle speedway rider
- Kari Laukkanen (born 1963), former Finnish football goalkeeper
- Mari Laukkanen (born 1987), Finnish biathlete and cross-country skier
- Noora Laukkanen (born 1993), Finnish swimmer
- Owen Laukkanen (born 1983), Canadian Author
- Tapio Laukkanen (born 1969), Finnish rally driver
- Teuvo Laukkanen (1919 – 2011), Finnish cross-country skier
- Usko Laukkanen (1930 - 2000), Finnish writer
