= Jarri, Iran =

Jarri or Jari (Persian: جري) in Iran may refer to:

- Jarri, Fars
- Jari, Kerman
