= Police corruption =

Abuse of power by civil law enforcement

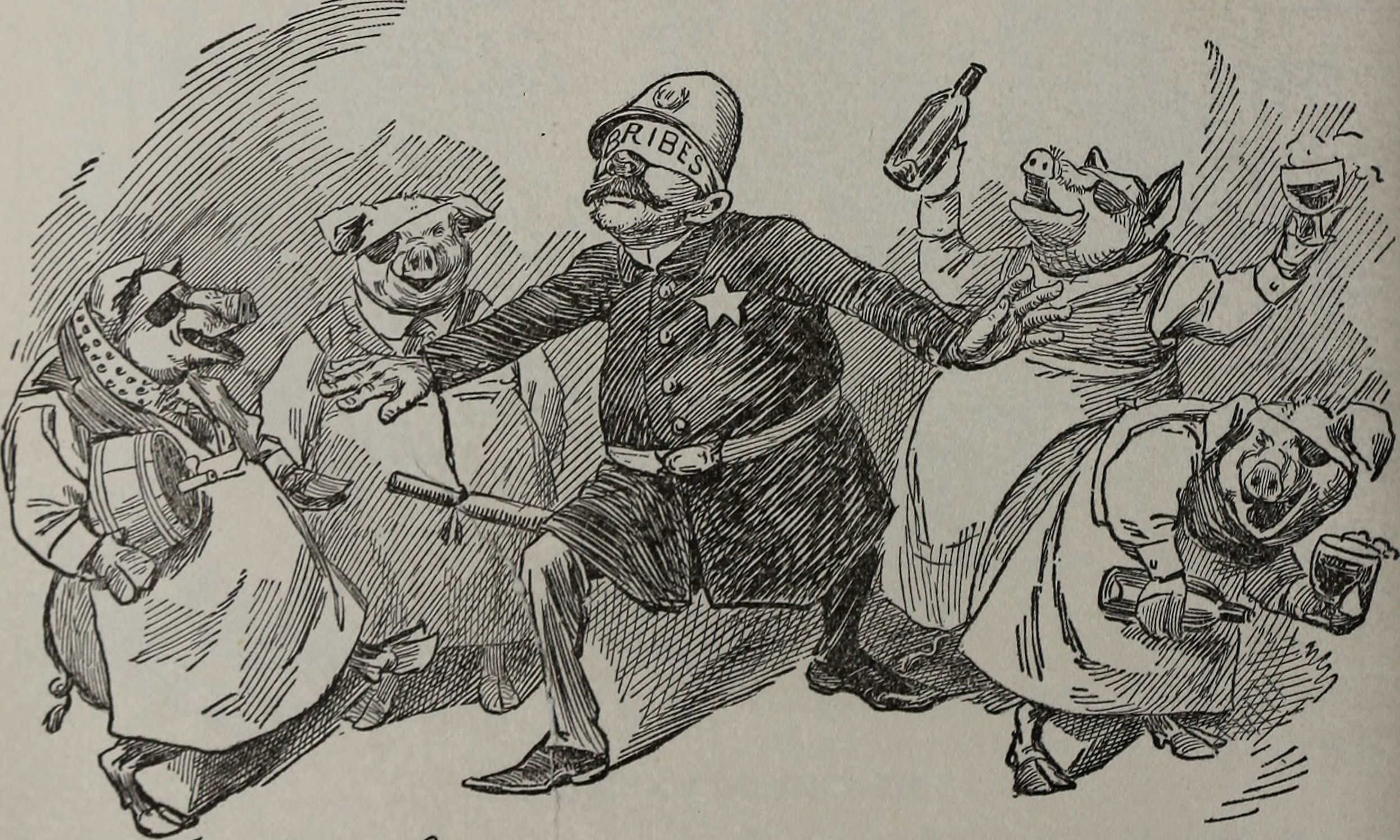
A 1902 cartoon depicts a police officer whose eyes are covered with a cloth labelled "bribes"

Police corruption is a form of police misconduct in which a law enforcement officer breaks their political contract and abuses their power for personal gain. Such a police officer is often referred to as a dirty cop. A corrupt officer may act alone or as part of a group. Corrupt acts include taking bribes, stealing from victims or suspects, and manipulating evidence to affect the outcome of legal proceedings (such as in a frameup). Police corruption challenges the human rights of citizens, and can undermine public trust in the police when uncovered or suspected.

== Types ==
Soliciting or accepting bribes in exchange for not reporting organized drug or prostitution rings or other illegal activities and violations of law, county and city ordinances and state and federal laws.

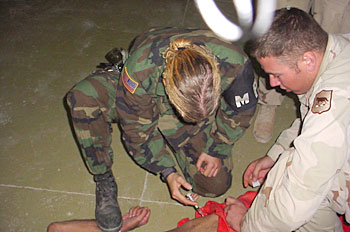
US Military Police officer restraining and sedating prisoner, while a soldier holds him down.

Bribes may also include leasing unlawful access to proprietary law enforcement databases and systems.

Flouting the police code of conduct in order to secure convictions of civilians and suspects—for example, through the use of falsified evidence. There are also situations where law enforcement officers may deliberately and systematically participate in organized crime themselves.

Selective enforcement

In most major cities, there are internal affairs sections to investigate suspected police corruption or misconduct, including selective enforcement, but there are situations where Internal Affairs also hides departmental and individual corruption, fraud, abuse and waste by individual officers, groups of officers, or even unwritten departmental policies. There are also Police Commissions who are complicit in the same cover-ups, often to hide internal and departmental problems, both from public view, and also from inter-departmental reviews and investigations. Certain officers can be fired, then rehired by petition after they accrue enough signatures, often from the very criminals and violators from whom corrupt officers have garnered previous favors in exchange for officers "turning a blind eye", resulting in selective enforcement of violations being deterred, but actually promoted.

Similar entities include the British Independent Police Complaints Commission. Police corruption is a significant and widespread problem in many departments and agencies worldwide.

It is not possible to measure the level of corruption in a country. Surveys of police officers, citizens and businesses can be used to provide estimates on levels of corruption. These are often inaccurate, as respondents involved in corruption are reluctant to provide any information implicating themselves in criminal activity. Despite this limitation, information collected from International Crime Victim Surveys and surveys conducted by the Global Corruption Enumerated Barometer can be used to estimate the level of police corruption.

== Corrupt acts ==
Police officers have several opportunities to gain personally from their status and authority as law enforcement officers. The Knapp Commission, which investigated corruption in the New York City Police Department in the early 1970s, divided corrupt officers into two types: meat-eaters, who "aggressively misuse their police powers for personal gain", and grass-eaters, who "simply accept the payoffs that the happenstances of police work throw their way."

There are multiple typologies of police corruption that have been asserted by academics. However, common corrupt acts that have been committed by police officers can be classified as follows:

- Death in custody: Murder of an accused or convicted person in custody by way of a beating. Corrections Officers who engage in this behavior are known as a "beat up squad". Officers disabling Bodycams (visual, sound, or both) are often involved.
- Corruption of authority: When police officers receive free drinks, meals, and other gratuities, because they are police officers, whether intentionally or unintentionally, they convey an image of corruption.
- Extortion/bribery: Demanding or receiving payment for criminal offenses, to overlook a crime or a possible future crime. Types of bribery are protection for illegal activities, ticket fixing, altering testimony, destroying evidence, and selling criminal information. Bribery is one of the most common acts of corruption.
- Theft and burglary are when an officer or department steals from a suspect, victim, or corpse. Examples are taking drugs for personal use in a drug bust, and taking personal objects from a corpse at the scene of a crime. A theft can also occur within a department. An officer can steal property from the department's evidence room or property room for personal use.
- Shakedowns: When a police officer is aware of a crime and the violator but accepts a bribe for not arresting the violator (Roebuck & Barker, 1973).
- "Fixing": Undermining criminal prosecutions by withholding evidence or failing to appear at judicial hearings, for bribery or as a personal favor.
- Perjury: Lying to protect other officers or oneself in a court of law or a department investigation.s.
- Internal payoffs: Prerogatives and prerequisites of law enforcement organizations, such as shifts and holidays, being bought and sold.
- Overtime Fraud: Obtaining large sums of overtime without being at work.
- The "frameup": The planting or adding to evidence, especially in drug cases.
- Ticket fixing: Police officers cancelling traffic tickets as a favor to the friends and family of other police officers.

== Behavior ==
Corrupted behavior can be caused by the behavioral change of the officer within the police "subculture". A subculture is a group of individuals within a culture that shares the same attitudes and beliefs. Police officers within the department share the same norms and new behavioral development can be attributed through psychological, sociological, and anthropological paradigms.

- Psychological paradigm: The psychological paradigm suggests that behavior is based and structured through an individual's early stages of life. Those attracted to the police occupation tend to be more "authoritarian". The authoritarian personality is characterized by conservative, aggressive, cynical, and rigid behaviors. Corruption may involve profit or another type of material benefit gained illegally as a consequence of the officer's authority. Psychological corruption can be a part of a department's culture or from a certain individual.
- Sociological paradigm: The sociological paradigm focuses on individual exposure to a police training academy, regular in-service training, and field experience all of which shape occupational character. Police learn how to behave, discretion, morals and what to think from their shared experiences with other police officers. New recruits develop definitions with their peers, either positive or negative. These definitions are then reinforced, positively or negatively, by the rewards or punishments (either real or perceived) that follow their behavior. For example, a new recruit may be given an order by his peer to arrest an individual sitting in the passenger seat for a DUI. This action can end up negatively or positively for the officer, depending on how the situation is perceived by the court later on.
- Anthropological paradigm: When an individual's social character is changed, an officer becomes part of the occupational culture. The term culture is often used to describe differences among large social groups where they share unique beliefs, morals, customs, and other characteristics that set them apart from other groups. Within the police culture, officers learn to be suspicious of the public. Police culture can also be quite racist, and shot through with assumptions about the criminal tendencies of certain minority groups, such as African Americans, or the competency of fellow officers from minority backgrounds, which can lead officers to make corrupted choices for personal benefits or gains.

== Prevalence ==
Accurate information about the prevalence of police corruption is hard to come by, since the corrupt activities tend to happen in secret and police organizations have little incentive to publish information about corruption. Police officials and researchers alike have argued that in some countries, large-scale corruption involving the police not only exists but can even become institutionalized. One study of corruption in the Los Angeles Police Department (focusing particularly on the Rampart scandal) proposed that certain forms of police corruption may be the norm, rather than the exception, in American policing. In the UK, an internal investigation in 2002 into the largest police force, the Metropolitan Police, Operation Tiberius found that the force was so corrupt that "organized criminals were able to infiltrate Scotland Yard "at will" by bribing corrupt officers ... and that Britain's biggest force experienced 'endemic corruption' at the time".

Where corruption exists, the widespread existence of a Blue Code of Silence among the police can prevent the corruption from coming to light. Officers in these situations commonly fail to report corrupt behavior or provide false testimony to outside investigators to cover up criminal activity by their fellow officers. The well-known case of Frank Serpico, a police officer who spoke out about pervasive corruption in the New York City Police Department despite the open hostility of other members, illustrates how powerful the code of silence can be. In Australia in 1994, by 46 votes to 45, independent politician John Hatton forced the New South Wales state government to override the Independent Commission Against Corruption and the advice of senior police to establish a ground-breaking Royal Commission into Police Corruption However, in a number of countries, such as China, Pakistan, Malaysia, Russia, Ukraine, Brazil or Mexico, police corruption remains to be one of the largest social problems facing their countries.

=== By country ===
==== Afghanistan ====
The Afghan National Police (ANP) are considered notoriously corrupt. The Ministry of the Interior has been criticized for "failing to properly account for billions of dollars allocated for police salaries via a U.N.-administered trust fund." Corruption robs police officers of up to half of their salaries, which makes them more likely to solicit bribes. A 2012 Asia Foundation survey found that over half of Afghans who had dealt with an ANP officer during the previous year had been forced to pay a bribe.

Beginning in 2009, policemen in parts of Afghanistan began to be paid through their cell phones, which prevented their superiors from skimming off part of their wages. According to MIT Technology Review, the bribes had been so immense that on their first pay period on the phone system, the police officers believed they had received a pay raise, when in fact they were simply receiving their full pay without any administrative bribes or extortion taking place.

Reuters reported in August 2011 that "an expanding dossier of unresolved police violence and corruption cases ... have alienated Afghans," and that this called into question the feasibility of rebuilding the civic institutions of the war-torn nation.

Fox News reported in October 2014 that Afghan officials may have systematically stolen $300 million from a UNDP trust fund used to pay police officers in Afghanistan and that European Union donors had withheld about $100 million in contributions to the fund owing to concerns about the fund's management. The UNDP itself stated that it was not the agency's responsibility to address this corruption.

Some police officers, according to a 2015 report, have informed the Taliban of impending operations, presumably in exchange for bribes.

==== Austria ====
Until 2010, few corruption cases had been prosecuted against the Austrian police. There have been a low number of indictments relating to corruption. This is supported by Transparency International's Corruption Perception Index, which ranks Austria among the 16 countries with the lowest corruption levels, with 7.8 points. The general public supports these statistics further, as only 25% believe that bribery offering and bribery acceptance are widespread amongst Austrian police officers. Whilst this figure may still appear to be high, it is still much lower than the average for the EU (34%). The success, in comparison to many other nations, can be in part attributed to the stable economic performance of the state, which allows the Austrian police force to receive appropriate salaries. As a result, the likelihood that a significant number of Austrian police officers would consider engaging in corrupt practices as a way of making a living is minimal, and rather acts of police corruption tend to be committed episodically. Austria is a gateway to the European Union from Eastern European countries, which creates additional corruption opportunities. Despite this, studies illustrate that officers and supervisors tend to be knowledgeable about the boundaries of the police culture, especially with regard to the types of behaviours permitted and prohibited.

Whilst Austria has somewhat been devoid of corruption, there have been several corruption cases, particularly over the last several years, which question the accountability of the Austrian police. In 2006, the Vienna police chief was charged with abuse of office and unauthorized acceptance of gifts from private companies, testament to the rising number of corruption acts committed by Austrian police. This is further expressed by Eurobarometer data that emphasises this recent spike in police corruption, as surveys highlighted that in 2011, 80% of Austrian citizens exclaimed that corruption was a serious problem, compared to 60% in 2009. The figures from 2011 are above the EU average of 76%, indicating that the recent years have been littered with police corruption crimes that include abuse of office, unauthorized disclosure of information, as well as bribery acceptance. Despite such a rapid elevation in corruption cases amongst police authorities in Austria, no public data and scarce quantities of academic research detailing the number of police officers registered or suspected of or involved in acts of corruption are available. This makes it extremely difficult to assess the extent and nature of the corrupt practices being conducted by the Austrian police. This is because the institutions in charge of countering corruption have only started analyzing it in the last few years, due to the contemporary context in which police corruption in Austria is situated. Despite this recent escalation in police corruption prevalence, Austria still remains a country that is characterized by a low number of corruption cases compared to other countries throughout the world.

The economic security of Austria has allowed the police to develop internal control measures that are necessary for identifying and combating corruption. Established internal control measures include the Office for Internal Affairs, the Office for Public Affairs, as well as the Office of the Ombudsman. These developments, amongst many others, are illustrative of the active, preventive approach adopted by the Austrian government and the Ministry of the Interior to address the recent trend of corruption manifestations. These institutional bodies, coupled with the high degree of intolerance toward corruption amongst Austrian citizens, and the stable nature of the Austrian economy, appear to facilitate the foundations for a positive framework needed in order to mitigate and eradicate police corruption throughout Austria.

==== China ====
In mainland China, the collusion between corrupt police officers and gang bosses is a major concern, bringing legitimacy issues to the police as well as the ruling party. Since the 1990s, China's anti-corruption campaigns have focused on serious organized crime and corrupt government officials who act as a 'protective umbrella' (protectors) for local gangsters. Criminal organizations that are not able to seek protection from local police officers are very likely to be destroyed during China's anti-crime campaigns, while criminal groups under police protection are able to survive and control illegal businesses (e.g., gambling, prostitution and drugs) in their territories.

==== Belgium ====
Belgium's levels of corruption in police and business matters are considered to be low. A 2012 ranking specifically on police corruption rated Belgium 16th out of 176. The 2013 Special Eurobarometer stated that 67% percent of Belgium's population felt general corruption, not just police-related, was widespread, compared to the EU average of 76%.

Respondents to the Global Corruption Barometer in 2014 stated that, on a scale of 1-5 (5 being extremely corrupt), police corruption was at 3.2. 11% of respondents felt police corruption had increased since 2011, 51% felt it had decreased. 61% of respondents felt the government's response to police corruption was ineffective.

Two independent organizations deal with police corruption: the General Inspectorate of the Police (AIG) and the Committee P. There are also 196 internal control units within local police forces to deal with minor incidents and police misconduct in conjunction with the AIG and Committee P. In 2011, out of 1,045 investigations by the AIG, 6 were specifically corruption-based, with higher numbers of breaching professional confidence (44) or fraud (26), but lower (3) of abuse of police power. To maintain impartiality, the AIG has completely separate servers from the police, but draws on a number of databases for its investigations, as well as working together with the Committee P. The Committee P generally deals with the most important corruption cases, such as those relating to organized crime or torture. Belgium also has other institutions that deal with corruption, including police-related cases, on a wider scale: the Standing Police Monitoring Committee, and the Central Office for the Repression of Corruption (OCRC).

===== Case of Marc Dutroux =====
In 2004, the high-profile case of Belgian serial killer and child molester Marc Dutroux resulted in outrage in the community amidst allegations of police corruption and incompetence. Dutroux was meant to be under police surveillance the night he kidnapped two of his victims, but the police had programmed the camera to operate only during the day. The police failed to locate two living victims being held captive during a search of Dutroux's home in 1995. A locksmith who was accompanying the police during the search said he heard children's cries, but was dismissed by the police. The police claimed that they did not view seized videotapes of Dutroux constructing his "dungeon" as at the time they had no VCR. Dutroux claimed he was part of a sex ring that involved high-ranking members of Belgian police and government. The widespread anger over the continued failings of the police and Dutroux's sex-ring allegations, as well as the dismissal of the presiding judge Jean-Marc Connerott, led to the "White March" in 1996, demanding reforms to Belgian police and judicial systems. Connerotte testified that the investigation was deliberately hampered by officials. Dutroux also escaped from police custody in 1998 before being apprehended. A parliamentary commission into the Dutroux case in 1998 found that the defendant benefited from police corruption and incompetence. Although police were cleared of direct compliance in Dutroux's crimes, the report cited major gross negligence throughout Belgium's police system, and an overhaul was called for. The case severely damaged the Belgian community's trust in their police and law enforcement systems.

===== Case of Stefan P =====
In 2006, a Flemish, i.e., Dutch-speaking, Belgian police officer was sentenced to six months in jail for attempting to extort the equivalent of £160,000 from the parents of a missing woman in 2004, telling them they would be more likely to see their daughter again if they acquiesced. He confessed, but after serving his sentence successfully, he appealed his sacking from the police as the sacking had been done by a French-speaking officer. Belgium has laws in place to uphold the "rights" of the speakers of each language, including that of a police officer who is being disciplined to undergo questioning in their own language. The former officer was working on a compensation claim and calling for reinstatement as of 2012.

==== Bulgaria ====
Data from the 2011 Eurobarometer research places Bulgaria fourth in the European Union (EU) in terms of bribes paid to public officials. The main factor behind this ranking is bribes paid to police officers. According to the same research, Bulgaria sits first on the list of EU member states with widespread police corruption.

While many of the duties of safeguarding - largely through oppression - the communist rule in Bulgaria was undertaken by the Ministry of the Interior (MoI), after 1989 its make-up changed dramatically. From 1990 to 1993, almost one quarter of the MoI's staff were dismissed - between 12,000 and 19,000 police officers, 60-90% of which were officers at the medium and senior levels. Additionally, a role in the political conflicts of the 1990s led to further dismissals of national and regional police detectives and mass layoffs of middle-ranking officers. Simultaneously, Bulgaria was undergoing a transition from the Soviet Communist regime to democracy, leading to a sharp increase in crime and criminal incidents (up to ten times in growth for some crimes), coupled with a severe economic downturn and the emergence of a large number of criminal groups. The effects of these drastic changes to the MoI and dramatic upheaval of Bulgaria's political landscape culminated in the financial and economic crisis of 1996–97, during which police corruption rose on almost all levels.

Before these changes from 1944 to 1989, abuses within the MoI were investigated by the State Security, an almost replica of the Soviet KGB, which had total control of law enforcement. This was achieved by monitoring the political loyalty of MoI staff, but also by exceptional powers to investigate abuses, including the use of undercover agents and virtually unlimited powers to investigate. However, the considerable experience accumulated over these years was lost immediately after the democratic change in 1989, when the body was disbanded.

After Bulgaria joined the EU in 2007, the country was seriously challenged to eliminate instances of police corruption. As a result of this, the deputy chief of a police service was dismissed over accusations of illicit contact with an alcohol producer, and police misconduct has been limited by institutional and legal changes.

However, Bulgaria continues to experience everyday police corruption, and the Bulgarian people continue to hold negative views of the nation's police force. Corruption and conflicts of interest continue to offer a serious challenge to public perceptions of the Bulgarian police, attitudes that are not only encouraged by political scandals and frequent media coverage of police corruption, but also by the personal experiences of everyday Bulgarians. In 2013, 65% of respondents to Transparency International's Global Corruption Barometer thought that the police were either corrupt or extremely corrupt. However, comparing this to 86% who felt the same about the judiciary and 71% for the parliament/legislator, shows that Bulgarians are regaining trust in their police force, or at the very least, have more trust in them than other public officials who have some effect on their legal protection.

===== Bribery =====
In 2011, Eurobarometer research that asked respondents to report whether or not they had been pressured to pay bribes to the police ranked Bulgaria first in the EU, with 7% of respondents claiming that they had been. Within this research, it was found that 450,000 Bulgarians annually were asked for bribes by police, a number that did not change substantially between 2009 and 2011. According to the same research, 70% of Bulgarians believe that bribery is widespread in the police force.

This perception was not aided by the arrest of seventeen traffic police officers on 27 September 2011 for charges of corruption and operating in organised crime groups. According to Sofia City Prosecutor Nikolai Kokinov, these officers were pooling the bribes they received at the end of their shifts and dividing the money between them, sometimes taking up to 500 liva a shift. According to Kokinov, police do not receive large bribes, but instead are given small ones regularly.

These arrests have not affected instances of bribing the police. Transparency International's 2013 Global Corruption Barometer recorded 17% of respondents claiming that they paid a bribe to the police.

===== Challenges to Bulgarian Corruption =====
Bulgaria began undergoing political stabilisation in the late 1990s/early 2000s, after which attempts were made to fill the watchdog and counter-corruption enforcement agency hole left by the State Security. A telephone hotline and website were open for the submission of complaints to be used by the MoI Inspectorate. The Inspectorate was also given controlling, preventive and disciplinary functions by the Ministry of Interior Act. It is split into two divisions: "control of management" and "countering corruption in the Ministry of Interior". The 35 officers of the Inspectorate have a number of functions, ranging from assessing corruption risks, undertaking inspections aimed at reducing and preventing corruption, reviewing complaints received about the MoI and supervising the implementation of inspections. They report directly to the Minister of Interior.

In 2008, Bulgaria also introduced a new intelligence and counter-intelligence agency, the State Agency for National Security (SANS). It is directly subordinated to the Prime Minister and exists outside the MoI, which gives the agency a degree of independence if it is tasked with investigating corruption within the MoI, particularly regarding corruption among senior officers and management. However, SANS is purely intelligence-gathering, and has no police powers.

As a result of these two initiatives, 74 disciplinary sanctions were imposed against members of the Bulgarian police. Of these 74, six cases were referred to the prosecution, and the MoI was advised to dismiss officers accused of misconduct in a further seven of them.

2008 also saw the establishment of the Internal Security Directorate (ISD) of the MoI, the first service since 1990 that has multiple officers around the country, as well as the ability to combine covert methods with police powers. This means that for the first time since the dissolution of the State Security, a branch of the MoI had the ability to use surveillance techniques to expose police corruption, including a network of undercover agents, as well as take proactive measures - on the basis of risk analysis - to end corruption, actively seeking and collecting evidence on MoI staff without complaints being submitted, something that neither SANS nor the Inspectorate can do. In 2011, data from the ISD indicated that 1,200 complaints were followed up on that year, leading to around 300 infringements being substantiated and 100-120 officers were dismissed or indicted. This large upswing is due to the organisational changes undertaken in the MoI, which no longer allow complaints to remain within the division where they were made, but instead must be referred to the ISD or the Inspectorate.

Further changes were undertaken to reduce police corruption in 2014, with all MoI cars being equipped with GPS systems, and then video cameras and microphones being fitted to all traffic police patrol cars that record what passes between traffic police and drivers. As part of this initiative, rules were changed that allowed an MoI vehicles to carry out roadside checks of motorists. As of 25 November, these checks have only been allowed to be undertaken by traffic police. Bulgarian Interior Minister Vesselin Vuchkov claimed these new measures were expected to cut corruption by 80% by reducing direct contact between police and motorists, and thus lowering the opportunity for police to receive bribes and participate in corruption.

==== Croatia ====
In 2002, accepting bribes was a common form of street police corruption in Croatia. According to the International Victim Crimes Survey, 15 out of 100 respondents reported paying a bribe within the last year – 44% of which were paid to police officers. This frequency was higher than most other Eastern European countries, with respondents suggesting that police in Croatia were targeted more frequently for successful bribes compared to other countries in Eastern Europe. These results indicated that police corruption, especially regarding the acceptance of a bribe by a police officer, seemed to be more prevalent among Croatian police than among police in other Eastern European countries.

===== Controlling =====
Prosecution of corruption is based on the 1997 Criminal Code. Article 337 of the code states that "a public official who abuses the office, oversteps the limits of official authority, or fails to perform the official duty to obtain pecuniary gain or other non-pecuniary benefit could be charged criminally". As well as this, section 347 of the code prohibits the acceptance of a bribe by any public official, explicitly listing police officers. These two sections provide grounds for the prosecution of police for several forms of police corruption.

In order to establish a successful corruption-control system in Croatia, it is essential that the police be held responsible for corruption. There must be a legally sound basis for the punishment of corrupt police officers and legal tools to achieve this punishment. Sections 337 and 347 make this achievable, as do the sanctions listed in the Criminal Code. As well as this, these norms of not accepting police corruption should be enforced. That is, police officers must be held responsible for their actions and sanctions should be exercised.

==== Cyprus ====
Police corruption in Cyprus is unofficially monitored by the Independent Authority for the Investigation of Allegations and Complaints Against the Police. In 2013, the Authority heard a total of 145 complaints against the police by the public, from 132 complaints in 2012. However, there is no official, government-mandated authority to combat and monitor corruption, nor an official government anti-corruption strategy. Corruption within the Cyprus Police should be handled internally, as per the Cyprus Code of Police Ethics.

Corrupt activities among the police are typically defined as using a position of power to influence particular decisions, such as nepotism, the giving and taking of bribes, accessing information that is not directly related to an officer's current work or investigation(s), and lower levels of organised crime are also commonly noted in cases of police corruption.

A Eurobarometer Report by the European Commission in 2009 indicated that the grand majority of Cypriots (94%) believe that corruption is widespread in the police and the wider public affairs sector at national, regional, and local levels. A follow-up survey in 2012 indicated that 97% of Cypriots believed that corruption was a major issue for the country.

The 2009 report also showed that 89% of Cypriots believed that corruption was widespread within the Cyprian Police Service involving bribes and the abuse of positions of power (nepotism), compared to an average of 39% of European Union citizens believing corruption is widespread among their own police services or institutions. Additionally, 80% of Cyprian respondents to the Eurobarometer 2009 Report agreed that corruption is unavoidable within the public, police, and government sectors, whereas only 14% disagreed with the statement.

The 2013 Eurobarometer Report on Corruption indicated that the top three reasons for corruption occurring in Cyprus are: "because politicians and government are not doing enough to fight corruption (88%), the lack of real punishment (87%), and the lack of meritocracy (87%)". Oddly, 65% of Cypriots have reported having a strong level of confidence in the police in an unofficial 2013 survey comparing trust in the police across 50 countries. However, this disparity may be influenced by the continually changing perceptions of respondents based on recent experiences, or the political climate. Due to Cyprus's geographical composition as an island, corruption can spread across several networks, as high-ranking locals across several disciplines, such as politics, law enforcement, judicial officials, and businessmen, interact closely within the same social circles; whereas these relationships may be significantly diffused across larger mainland countries.

Transparency International (TI) has recommended that a Coordinating Body Against Corruption should be established under the Cyprian Attorney General, which is able to combat and enact strategic policies against corruption in the public and law enforcement sectors. Specifically, TI has recommended that an increase in police salaries, a reinforcement of the ethical code, and improved working conditions should be implemented to discourage the risk of accepting bribes to increase officers' own income. Additionally, a greater transparency in the disclosure of assets, or second jobs to supplement income, should be incorporated into the duties of high-ranking law enforcement officials, so that future conflicts of interest can be made aware of and monitored.

==== Czech Republic ====
Police corruption in the Czech Republic can be perceived in two categories: petty everyday corruption (e.g., bribery and favouritism), and major economic corruption, involving foreign investments requiring both state support and subsidy decision-making.

Within these areas, sections 158 – 162 detail forms of corruption ranging from abuse of power by a public official to indirect bribery. The Czech Republic joined the EU in May 2004, following the splitting of Czechoslovakia in 1993. Since this split, corruption has made a steady incline. In 2001, 163 individuals were prosecuted with corrupt activity, of whom 142 were in relation to bribery. This is in comparison to the 110 individuals prosecuted in 2000. In 1995, the number of ascertained crimes committed by officers with involvement in management and administration was calculated at 1,081; by 1999, this figure had jumped 10.1% to 5,081, which steadily declined into the 2000s. Royalties gained through major economic corruption are largely conspicuous. Tied up in ostentatious villas, over-budget public construction projects and local government offices. These "landmarks" are prominent enough to prompt guided tours around Prague. Curious tourists are directed between structures funded through large sums of taxpayers' money. Money ends up in the pockets of civil servants and corrupt businessmen.

In 1991, the "Service for the Protection of Economic Interests" was set up, which later evolved into the "Unit for Combating Corruption and Serious Economic Crime of the Criminal Police and Investigation Service" in January 2002. Its function: to detect connections between corruption and organised crime, in cooperation with the "Criminal Police Service and Investigation Unit of the Czech Police for Revealing Organised Crime". Similarly, the "Inspection Department of the Ministry of the Interior" (IDMI) a police unit that deals with offences committed by police officers. This unit targets petty everyday corruption, involving low-level employees of the state who abuse their power for personal gain. Policemen earn a fraction of the salary of a military officer. Where the Fire Brigade has 14 districts within the Czech Republic, the Police force only has 8, resulting in limited opportunity for climbing regional ranks. Policemen must also undergo far lengthier training than their better-paid Army and Fire Brigade colleagues. Such inequities prompt feelings of resentment among Police ranks. As a result, systems are now in place to combat petty corruption. Including automated cameras at traffic lights, sending infringements directly to a driver, avoiding any physical interaction with a policing officer. At the same time, "The Unit for Combating Corruption and Financial Crime" (UOKFK), established by the Ministry of the Interior, also provides continuing education relating to domestic corruption and integrity of the Czech police force. Police Corruption in the Czech Republic is an ongoing issue, however, one that is actively combatted through state and local action.

==== Denmark ====
When asked specifically about public perceptions of police corruption, a rating of 2 was given (with 1 being least corrupt and 5 being most), which was lower than the perceived corruption in any other sector surveyed, other than education, which was also rated a 2.

Danish police have a respectable reputation of not being associated with corruption and the public has great trust in the Danish police force. Although corruption is a rarity amongst Danish Police, there are effective procedures in place for the investigation and punishment of any police corruption. The Danish Independent Police Complaint Authority was formed to handle any allegations (corruption or other matters) made against the police force. The Police Complaints Authority council and chief executive deliberate and make decisions, based upon complaints of police misconduct, independently of police and prosecutors. To ensure transparency, the council consists of two members of the general public, as well as the chair, who is a High Court Judge, an attorney, and a professor of jurisprudence. This council is reappointed every four years. Outlined in a very clear and simple document is a guide on how complaints can be made by oneself, a bystander, or on behalf of another. The document explains how lodging a complaint is free of charge and can be made in writing online, in person, or over the telephone, within six months of the relevant incident.

In 2012, the Police Complaints Authority received 655 complaints, with most cases involving accusations of general misconduct such as traffic violations (e.g., speeding without activated police lights), excessive use of force during arrests, foul language, or illegitimate access to the police database (officers are only allowed to check the database in police cases they are directly involved in), whereas accusations of corruption were very rare. There were concerns surrounding the difficulty with the investigation of a number of general misconduct incidents due to problems with identifying the involved officers. This resulted in the suggestion of police officers wearing identity numbers on their uniforms. Uniform numbers were introduced in 2016.

==== Ecuador ====
Ecuador's police have been accused of corruption. In 2008, after the U.S. Embassy in Quito concluded that then commander of the National Police, Jaime Aquilino Hurtado, had “used his power...to extort, accumulating money and property, facilitate human trafficking, and obstruct investigations against corrupt peers,” the U.S. State Department revoked the U.S. entry visas of Hurtado and his family. These alleged corrupt activities began before Hurtado was named commander, and U.S. authorities believed that Correa was aware of them when he appointed Hurtado to that position. The help Hurtado gave to human traffickers was believed to have enabled criminals and terrorists to enter the U.S. Among Hurtado's accomplices was a police chief, Bolivar Villota, whom he hired to develop a resort he owned. Villota was arrested in 2007 for extortion but Hurtado managed to keep him in office. Two other police officers, Milton Raul Andrade and Manuel Fernando Basantes, were found to be involved in smuggling immigrants, mostly Chinese, into the U.S. Hurtado, who was also a part of this racket, protected those officers, too.

==== Estonia ====
Estonia's experiences of corruption in general, and more specifically, corruption in the police force, are low in comparison to the European Union's average. While there is no specific anti-corruption agency or body that deals with corruption in Estonia, the Security Police Board and Police Board are in charge of investigating and regulating any instances of police corruption. The Security Police, established in 1993, is an impartial board within the Ministry of Internal Affairs. Their main aims are to gather intelligence, counter-terrorism, and enact anti-corruption measures. This board comprises four regional departments that mainly deal with corruption surrounding "higher officials". The majority of their force have received higher education with "specialised training in corruption investigations". Their primary purpose is to investigate instances of corruption, committed only by public servants. The achievements of this board, thus far, have been solving cases of significant white-collar crime and corruption in the border and customs guard. In regard to the Estonian Police, in particular, while all police officers have to go through some initial anti-corruption training, there are no yearly requirements they must fulfill in terms of continued training.

The general police are governed by the Police Board which has an Internal Control Division that is responsible for the investigation of misconduct and corruption. The Police board is in control of investigating smaller instances of corruption, as well as those cases concerning civic officials. These anti-corruption strategies and boards fall under multiple Anti-Corruption Strategies, which have been implemented by the Ministry of Justice. The most recent of these strategies is the 'Anti-Corruption Strategy 2013-2020'. The strategy crosses many private and public areas and sectors of Estonia. The strategy aims to both raise awareness and educate the population about corruption and corruption-willingness. Within the guidelines of this strategy, all decisions, regulations and policies implemented by the different ministries and boards must abide by the rule of transparency, whereby the public must be informed of what is occurring, how much it will cost and why. In the report for this strategy, it is acknowledged that there is a higher risk of corruption for those working in law enforcement agencies. Therefore, the Ministry of Justice pays close attention to these areas and has set about implementing strict measures and bodies to govern all law enforcement agencies. While the anti-corruption strategy has greatly assisted in decreasing levels of corruption in the general police force, the rate of corruption in the Border and Customs Guard Agency is still fairly high.

Due to Estonia's position on the border of the European Union (EU) its Border and Customs Guards come in contact with a great deal of organised crime and immigrants seeking to cross the eastern border of Estonia into the EU. The result is that many officials in this agency see the opportunity to increase their wealth through corruption and, in turn, accept bribes to let immigrants into Estonia and the EU. These types of corrupt officials pose a serious threat to both national security and the security of the EU when they let in illegal immigrants, in particular those involved in organised crime. In the Permanent Mission of Estonia, the Estonian Government states that the aim of all anti-corruption strategies set up in their country is to ensure their population is allowed full enjoyment of their human rights. Through the long-term anti-corruption strategies, the Estonian Government aims to rid its country of any sort of corruption which could infringe on people's rights or pose a threat to national or international security.

==== Finland ====
Finland has been found to consistently be one of the world's least corrupt nations. In 2012, the Corruption Perceptions Index rated the Finns as the world's least corrupt country (tied with Denmark and New Zealand). However, they fell to third in 2013 and remained there the following year, losing only one point on the table in that time. The Finns believe that this is due to heavily ingrained societal values that are shared amongst the population, as well as there being adequate wages and low disparities of income for the majority of the country. The latter reduces the propensity to accept bribes and checks economic greed.

In terms of police corruption, regular surveys of the public are taken in order to gauge perceptions of transparency in law enforcement officials. The 2007 Police Barometer survey found that one in four Finns thinks that it is very likely that corruption exists in some form within the police. Further, one in six Finns thinks that the police might act in an unethical manner towards foreigners by misusing information or mistreating detainees. The survey also found that trust in police remains high, but whilst the public considers that law enforcement officers generally conduct themselves well in interactions with clients and citizens, the standard has deteriorated somewhat. This could be due to the high expectations Finns carry of the police, but it certainly shows that the public is of a high opinion of the transparency afforded them in the department of law enforcement.

More recent surveys show significant changes in the figures, however. In 2012, when Finland was at the top of the Corruption Perceptions Index, 27% of Finns believed that it was very likely that corruption existed in some form within the police. This figure is not dissimilar from the 2007 Police Barometer survey, yet the figure in the 2014 survey jumps to 42% of Finns. This is most likely due to the high-profile case of Jari Aarnio, the former chief investigator and head of Helsinki's anti-drugs police, who spent 30 years in the anti-drugs force in Finland, but was later revealed to be a drug lord himself. The story on Aarnio broke in September 2013, and in June 2015, the former head of the Helsinki drug squad was sentenced to 20 months imprisonment for aggravated abuse of office from 2009 to 2010 and for taking bribes from a private company. Prosecutors asked for a 13-year sentence during the hearings.

==== France ====
France is a member of the Council of Europe, which has many legal frameworks against corruption in place, including GRECO (Group of States Against Corruption), which applies to all Council of Europe signatories. GRECO works by equally monitoring the rights and obligations of the Council of Europe's Member States. Police are bound by the Recommendations on Codes of Conduct for Public Officials and the Criminal Law Convention on Corruption. In addition, France has its own Declaration of the Rights of Man and of the Citizen approved in August 1789, which outlines the rights of civilians including conduct applicable to public officials for fair treatment. In 1993, the Central Service for the Prevention of Corruption was also established in France to prevent corruption and indure transparency in economic life and public procedures. There are a number of bodies that monitor and investigate police corruption in France. The Inspection Générale de la Gendarmerie Nationale enables consistency, independence and impartiality of inspections carried out by the Gendarmerie Nationale.

Inspection Générale de la Police monitors and regulates police behaviour and the Commission Nationale de Deontologie de la Securité (CNDS) monitors ethical and moral codes required to be upheld by security forces in France. Other strategies, such as disabling officers from being on duty in their originating neighborhood and prohibiting officers from working in private investigation for three years after leaving the police force are enforced to ensure impartiality.

There are limited studies or reports on police corruption within France because the issue is generally avoided by official institutions and no institution has a comprehensive understanding of its prevalence. This may be due to a lack of attention from the media and other social science areas. It is a common assumption that police corruption in France is a rare occurrence in the area of organised crime. One explanation for institutional corruption in France is the hierarchical police system. This is due to higher rankings and specialised units having more discretion and being at higher risk of corruption.

Areas that have a heavy presence of organised crime, such as Marseille, are known to experience higher levels of police corruption.

===== Marseille =====
In 2012, twelve French police officers were apprehended after an internal complaint was lodged into suspected corruption within the elite anti-crime squad, also known as the Brigade Anti-Criminalité (BAC) that operates within the Marseille north. This region is known for high drug activity. Despite attention being brought to the head of Centrale Directorate of National Security, Pascal Ladalle, a full-scale judicial enquiry was not undertaken until the new police chief of Marseille was appointed. A total of 30 officers from the squad have been suspended for allegedly seizing drugs, money, cigarettes and jewellery from dealers and letting them go. The seized narcotics, money and valuables were all found in a makeshift ceiling at their station after a few months of investigation and surveillance. Investigations are still pending.

===== François Stuber =====
François Stuber was a police captain and Deputy Head of the Drug Squad in Strasbourg, France. One of Stuber's duties was to destroy drugs seized from operations; however, between 2003 and 2007, the officer instead traded narcotics, including marijuana, heroin and cocaine, to an established drug network. In addition to this, Stuber also imported drugs from various other networks. The former captain had an intimate relationship with a worker from the local court, Laurence Hamon, where they would use court information to ensure his drug network associates were not under investigation. This method was also employed to avoid tracing mechanisms imposed by the Inspection Generale de la Police Nationale to detect any abuse of information. Stuber worked closely with Laurence, using her residence to store the seized drugs and her banking accounts to launder money. Stuber was jailed for the maximum term of 10 years.

==== Germany ====
In 2020, in the German city of Essen, in North Rhine-Westphalia, the homes of 30 racist Nazi police officers were raided by their colleagues brought together from several different German states. The Nazi cops shared images like swastikas, a depiction of refugees in a gas chamber, and Reich flags.

The substantial legislation covering corruption offences within the German Criminal Code is indicative of the importance placed on combating this type of crime in Germany. In general, corruption is construed as an individual offence, although it is possible to be prosecuted for actions committed on behalf of a corporation under the Administrative Offences Act.

Alongside civil servants, judges and other public officials undertaking or appointed to a public administrative role, police officers may be held liable for criminal prosecution for corruption-related offences under Sections 331-338 of the German Criminal Code. Specifically, according to Section 331, a public official who requires, allows themselves to be promised, or accepts an advantage for themselves or a third party for the discharge of their duty is liable to criminal prosecution.

An advantage involves any type of benefit that may improve the individual's financial, legal or personal standing, which they are not legally entitled to receive. Although there is no statutory minimum to what can be interpreted as an unlawful benefit, minor customary advantages that are unlikely to impact the perception or decision-making process of the individual are not considered criminal.

Additionally, pursuant to Section 332 of the German Criminal Code, the past or future undertakings of an official act (e.g., lobbying of certain laws, services regulations, etc.) that violate official duties are considered unlawful. Penalties for this offence, as well as bribery in a public office in general, can range from fines to imprisonment, where the sanctions apply to each count of bribery, with a maximum sentence of 10 years for serious cases.

In addition to legislation, strategic approaches that target all German government bodies, including the police, are employed through the Federal Government Directive concerning the Prevention of Corruption in the Federal Administration. This directive recommends internal auditing, employment of a contact person for corruption-related issues rotation of staff and the principle of multiple controls in order to prevent and combat corruption within governmental bodies.

Beyond the domestic level, Germany is heavily involved in the creation and compliance with international anti-corruption standards via the United Nations, the World Bank, the Group of Eight (G8) and the Organization for Economic Cooperation and Development (OECD). German public institutions, such as the police, have also been acknowledged by the Council of Europe's Group of States against Corruption (GRECO) to have done considerable work to prevent corruption.

Public perception of police corruption is low among German citizens, according to the 2013 Special Eurobarometer on Corruption report. German respondents (16%) were among the least likely (within the European Union) to think that corruption, or the giving and taking of bribes and abuse of power for personal gain, is widespread among police and customs officers. More generally, 92% of German respondents do not feel personally affected by corruption in their daily lives, considerably higher than the 70% EU average. However, although more than half (59%) of respondents believe that corruption is prevalent within Germany, this is still considerably lower than the 76% EU average.

Despite more than half of German respondents perceiving a prevalence of corruption in German society, the experience of corruption is quite low. Less than 1% of German respondents reported they were requested or expected to pay a bribe in the year of the report, while only 9% indicated they were personally aware of someone who had accepted bribes, respectively below the 4% and 12% average among European Union citizens.

==== Greece ====
Today, Greece experiences some of the highest levels of police corruption in Europe, with 99% of its citizens believing that corruption in the country is widespread.

Transparency International surveys show that Greece ranks high among European Union nations in terms of perceptions of corruption. From 2013 to 2016, during the height of Greece's debt crisis, the annual Transparency International reports showed that Greeks ranked second-most corrupt among EU countries, behind only Bulgaria. (The country's relative position among European countries was more favorable before and after this period).

Bribing police officers is common in Greece. Citizens may offer the police monetary sums as a way of avoiding getting a ticket or in order to obtain a drivers license. 96% of Greek citizens believe that this is an acceptable practice and 93% believe that it is the easiest way of obtaining public services. The Hellenic Police Internal Affairs Unit has investigated cases of corruption among police, including police acceptance of bribes from traffickers. Human trafficking has become a more prominent issue in the realm of police bribery in recent times. Particularly as the state is an optimum destination for those seeking asylum, due to its many small islands and borders being difficult to patrol. It is not unusual for Greek police to provide fake documentation and plane tickets to illegal immigrants. A trafficker's circuit was discovered in the Santorini police department as recently as June 2015. It was reported that airline employees contacted the local police, concerned about passengers who may be travelling to European countries using forged documents. However, the police performed only rudimentary checks, and permitted the migrants to board the flights. According to the US Department of State 2014 Trafficking in Persons Report, police also recently dismantled a sex trafficking ring involving two police officers, who were then suspended from duty.

Greece is a member of the European Partners Against Corruption (EPAC). It is housed in Greece within the Hellenic Police Internal Affairs division, established in 1999 and has 120 staff. The National Strategic Reference Framework has also put forth €340,000 to fund "transparency and anti-corruption for good governance in public administration-police" seminars. The program will be made available to graduates of the Police Officers Academy of Greece. However, only 14% of Greeks believe that the government's efforts to combat corruption are effective. Furthermore, unlike other member states, the amount of corruption in Greece has increased rather than decreased, with its global ranking falling from 80th in 2011 to 94th in 2012. This is likely because of the state's financial difficulties. Data collected by the Greek anti-corruption task force in 2012 showed that corruption in the state had spiked, with 1,060 cases investigated – a 33% increase on 2011. Moreover, 710 (or 66.9%) of these were concerned with police officers.

==== Hungary ====
Hungarian criminologist Geza Finszter has named Hungary a fundamentally dishonest society. Due to this, real justice is nearly impossible to achieve. Government operations are not transparent. This leads to corruption, which is reflected in many aspects of its society, including politicians, judges, and the police force. Police force corruption affects the criminal investigators who have a greater amount of exposure to corruption than others. They are paid poorly, allowing well-endowed criminals to corrupt them. This corruption in the lower level of the police is not the biggest problem when it comes to police corruption in Hungary.

In the National police Organised Crime Division, high-ranking officers, with possible underworld ties, can choose to proceed or halt sensitive operations. In short if an investigation runs the risk of exposing political or other types of corruption, they tend to more often than not be shut down without much delay. According to Transparency International, many state-run institutions in Hungary are directed by government loyalists, allowing for an easy spread of corruption. It was also found that when it came to reporting corruption in Hungary, 70% of the population would not report instances of corruption due to a mistrust of authorities and a fear of the consequences for doing so. Transparency International claims that the government discourages its citizens when it comes to reporting corruption, as no adequate protection measures have been implemented to help whistleblowers.

Due to Hungary's geographical position which borders the former Yugoslavia and, its political history, it has become a major crossroads for the transportation of narcotics between Asia and Western Europe. According to the International Narcotics Control Strategy Report 2007, Hungarian border control and narcotics police seem to be tackling and resisting corruption to an extent. The report showed that the education of border police was making some difference when it came to the issue of corruption. Contrary to this however, it would appear that when it comes to prosecuting high-profile cases involving organised crime, including drug trafficking, sentences tend to be lenient. It would appear that corruption is systematic and prevalent throughout the entirety of the Hungarian Criminal Justice system reaching as high as Judges and, not just its police force. After being ranked in the bottom third of countries when it comes to corruption, and when looking at the ineffectiveness of the new anti-corruption laws that have been put in place, it is all too clear that corruption seems to be an accepted practice in Hungary's police force, at least for the foreseeable future.

==== Italy ====
Italy ranks at the same level or below Eastern European countries in the Corruption Perception rating. The Italian Police Force is difficult to monitor in terms of corruption due to its decentralised nature. There are four different branches of the Italian policing system, broken up into the Carabinieri, the State Police, the Local Police and the Guardia di Finanza. Due to the delegation of responsibilities between the branches, it is the case that monitoring all of them with one centralised and independent body becomes extremely logistical and difficult. The Guardia di Finanza is charged with the responsibility of regulating all financial dealings within and outside of Italy. It can be seen, therefore, that this branch of the national police force may need the most attention and regulation, due to their constant dealings with money.

==== Kazakhstan ====
Kazakhstan ranks below many countries in the Corruption Perception Index. Official statistics of corruption charges within the police show 203 in 2014, 307 in 2017, and 165 in 2019. These campaign-style zigzagging trends are still minuscule considering the scale of police bribe-taking in Kazakhstan. The International Crime Victims Survey (ICVS) reported that in a one year (June 2017–May 2018), 5.2% of Kazakhstanis were victims of official bribe-seeking and in almost half of these cases, the bribe-seeker was a police officer. Taking only the adult population of Kazakhstan into account, the ICVS police bribery figures suggest around 400,000 incidents of police bribery every year in Kazakhstan. These calculations are most likely very conservative in that they only capture when a bribe has been solicited and exclude instances of citizen-initiated bribery.

==== Latvia ====
Police corruption in Latvia is more prevalent than it is in other EU states. According to Transparency International, Latvia has a Corruption Perception Index score of 4.9 out of ten, indicating a high level of perceived corruption. Particularly concerning is that the judiciary and police received high scores (out of five) for public perceptions of corruption, being 3.2 and 3.3, respectively. Political parties and the legislature received scores of 4 and 3.7.

Police and customs have been identified as corruption hotspots in Latvia, with a majority (58%) of Latvians regarding it as widespread. In particular, the road police have one of the lowest ratings for perceived honesty and integrity and are considered more corrupt than any other government institution. This stems from the common practice of demanding bribes, for example, at traffic stops. In these situations, a person has little option other than to pay the bribe (and thus avoid a fine or more severe penalty). The motivations for corruption are not entirely clear. Public officials point to low salaries, which may explain a significant proportion of bribery incidents. However, other public institutions, such as the postal service, have significantly lower salaries than police or customs, yet much lower rates of bribery and corruption. Since 2000, highway police have not been allowed to levy on-the-spot fines, which is likely to reduce the incidence of bribery in that context.

Latvia began developing an anti-corruption policy in 1995, culminating in the Corruption Preventing and Combating Bureau (KNAB – Korupcijas novēršanas un apkarošanas birojs) in 2002. KNAB is a multi-purpose anti-corruption body whose functions include investigating corruption offences, controlling activities of public officials and education and training on corruption risk. This is the most common example of a single-body approach to anti-corruption policy, with similar bodies existing in Hong Kong (on which KNAB is based) and Australia. KNAB operates as a pre-trial investigation body, with authority to refer matters to the public prosecutor. It has a broad jurisdiction, though most of its cases involve bribery offences. In 2001, a high-profile corruption case emerged when the then Deputy Chief of the Economic Police was arrested for receiving a bribe in an attempt to prevent the investigation of a smuggling and tax evasion case.

Latvia is a relatively new Member state of the European Union, having only joined in 2004. A recent survey found that people in new member state countries, especially Latvia, agree that bribery is the easiest way of obtaining certain public services than those in the original EU states. In 1998, a survey posed the following question to Latvian households: "A system whereby people could anonymously report instances of corruption would not be successful because corruption is a natural part of our lives and helps solve many problems". Only 37% of respondents disagreed with the statement. Additionally, Latvia has one of the lowest reporting rates for corruption in the EU, and most Latvians do not believe the government's anti-corruption efforts are likely to be successful.

==== Lithuania ====
Police corruption in Lithuania was considered to be prevalent in a 2002 study by OSI, a liberal NGO funded by the controversial billionaire George Soros. Corruption is considered to be a widespread issue in Lithuanian society in general, occurring during interactions in both the private and public sectors. Two-thirds of people in Lithuania prosecuted for corruption-related offences between 1995 and 1998 were police officers. In 2002, the Lithuanian Police Department admitted that they were aware of the high levels of corruption within the force. Despite this, some progress to combat police corruption in Lithuania had been made by 2002.

The Police Department of the Ministry of Interior is the national police agency of Lithuania. The Criminal Police Bureau and the Public Police Bureau are additional, separate agencies. The Criminal Police Bureau consists of various departments, including, but not limited to, the Organised Crime Investigation Services. The Public Police Bureau also has numerous departments, including, but not limited to, the Preventive Service and Traffic Control Service. The Traffic Control Service is considered to be one of the most corrupt criminal justice bodies in Lithuania.

Prior to 2002, Traffic Control officers used to be empowered to issue on-the-spot fines far greater than their own salaries. As such, a common form of police corruption was known to occur where members of the public bribe traffic officers to avoid receiving expensive fines. This particular power was one explanation for the high levels of police corruption specific to the Traffic Control Service. By 2002, the police force had put into place measures to prevent such corruption, including disciplinary measures that in extreme cases can lead to dismissal from service.

The Lithuanian government's stance against police corruption is evident through its creation of anti-corruption bodies as well as its introduction of various legislative measures. In the opinion of the BBC, targeting police corruption in Lithuania was connected to the country's accession to the European Union in May 2004. Application and entrance to the EU saw Lithuania introduce numerous anti-corruption measures.

Lithuania's anti-corruption system is considered compliant with the UN Convention against Corruption, to which it signed in 2003 and ratified in 2006. Compliance is met through Lithuania's anti-corruption legal framework, as well as the Special Investigation Service, which is considered an independent anti-corruption law enforcement body.

The Special Investigative Service (SIS) is an independent national Lithuanian anti-corruption body formed in 1997. In 2008, SIS was rated second, after the media, as the most effective anti-corruption measure in Lithuania (by whom?). Previously, SIS was a subordinate of the Ministry of Interior; however, in 2000, it became an independent agency. The SIS's responsibilities range from solving and preventing corruption to developing Lithuania's anti-corruption strategy. Any member of the public can report potential cases of corruption to SIS.

Established in 1998, the Internal Investigation Service (IIS) is an internal police department that performs legal monitoring and is tasked with enforcing disciplinary sanctions when necessary. The IIS can investigate the actions of individual officers. The IIS reports to one of the Deputy Commissioner Generals and has the ability to investigate cases of police corruption.

As well as the Internal Investigation Service, the Immunity Service is responsible for preventing and investigating corruption within the Lithuanian police force. The Immunity Service reports to the Commissioner General of the Police.

Despite these measures, the issue of police corruption in Lithuania continues to be prevalent. The Special Eurobarometer 397 report on corruption found that 63% of Lithuanian respondents believed corruption within the police or customs to be widespread. Lithuania's levels of police force corruption can be deemed particularly high when compared to other European Union states. The police force was considered to be the most trusted of all institutions in the majority of European Union member states; however, Lithuania was one of three exceptions to this (along with Latvia and Croatia).

The success of Lithuania's anti-corruption methods has been difficult to measure. This was a main criticism made in a 2014 report by the European Commission measuring Lithuania's implementation of the United Nations Convention against Corruption. Whilst Lithuania has put appropriate anti-corruption measures in place, the success of such measures is difficult to measure due to limited disclosure of statistics and further limited public release as to how such anti-corruption institutions work in practice.

To form a balanced view of corruption in Lithuania, more comparative data would be required, focusing on the Lithuanian SSR, the interwar Republic of Lithuania, Lithuania in the Russian Empire and the Kingdom of Lithuania. Corruption perception might or might mot not be a valid measure of corruption; for example, it underestimates corruption in countries (such as France, Germany, Italy or the United Kingdom) which have considerably less press freedom (as exemplified by the World Press Freedom Index).

==== Luxembourg ====
The European Union's 2014 Anti-Corruption report placed Luxembourg, along with Denmark and Finland, as having the lowest experience of bribery in the European Union. Luxembourg was ranked in a 2013 report as being the 11th (out of 177) best country in regard to the perceived level of corruption existing in their public sectors. A perception survey published in 2013 suggested that 94% of respondents had not witnessed corruption in the past year and 92% of respondents did not feel that they had been affected by corruption in everyday life.

The results of these reports and perception surveys suggest that, whilst there are instances of corruption within Luxembourg, the European Union's assessment indicates that mechanisms exist to combat these instances and promote ethical behaviour on the part of public officials. Whilst Luxembourg lacks a specific anti-corruption strategy, soft-law instruments, such as the quasi-legal instruments of organisations like the European Union, inform judicial bodies and government officials in the course of prosecution. In recent years, their anti-corruption framework has had a particular focus on efficient control of public institutions such as police and government bodies to avoid anti-corruption behaviours in these sectors. Criminal law was last amended in 2011 to accommodate anti-corruption legislation, although the OECD (Organisation for Economic Co-operation and Development) recommended in August 2014 that more reform needed to be implemented to modify their criminal policy framework (due to gaps in legislation regarding foreign bribery offences). Positively, an inter-ministerial committee, the Corruption Prevention Committee, was established in 2007 and meets annually, which shows a conscious effort on behalf of the country to keep anti-corruption mechanisms at the forefront. A hotline has also been established which is run by Transparency International in Luxembourg. This hotline is an avenue for members of the public to submit claims of corruption and is a useful anti-corruption mechanism employed by Luxembourg.

==== Malta ====
The Malta Police Force (MPF) is the main law enforcement authority in Malta. It is the responsibility of the MPF to "preserve public order and peace, to prevent, detect and investigate offences, to collect evidence", and to ultimately bring the offenders before the court. Further, the MPF has the duty of maintaining efforts in investigating the abuse of police power and undertakings of corrupt activity.

Unfortunately, for the Maltese community, it is common practice that there is a "code of silence" within the MPF, where an officer may "turn a blind eye" to the misconduct performed by their fellow officer. Typically, this behaviour is customary regardless of the severity of the consequence, as it heightens the likelihood of the corrupt officer reciprocating assistance, trust and support when needed.

Whilst over one-third of Maltese citizens believe that the MPF engages in police corruption, particularly acts of bribery and abuse of their legitimate power, this figure has significantly reduced from 2014. A nation’s corruption level can be determined through the Corruption Perception Index (CPI). The CPI ranks countries on how corrupt their public sector is perceived by the World Bank and the World Economic Forum. Malta's CPI is 5.7 out of ten, which indicates Malta is 54% better than the average. This achievement can be seen as an outcome of the Maltese Government initiating various preventive bodies and relevant legislation.

The Economic Crime Unit of the Malta Police Force was initiated in 1987, and is primarily involved in investigating and detecting a variety of corruption offences, including smuggling, fraud and bribery. The MPF and the Police Commissioner initiate all prosecutions in Malta. Thus, to ensure legitimacy across all prosecutions, the MPF are required to adhere to disciplinary rules and are bound by a Code of Ethics. Additionally, Chapter 164 of the Maltese Police Act 1961 regulates the organisation, discipline and duties of the Malta Police Force. Specifically, section 7 of Article 33, Offences Against Discipline, provides a comprehensive list of activities undertaken by a member of the MPF that are considered to be "corrupt practices". Such "corrupt practices" include, but are not limited to: receiving any bribe; failing to promptly return any money or property received; improperly using their position as a police officer for "private advantage"; or, directly or indirectly requesting or receiving any gratuity without the consent of the Commissioner.

As corrupt practices are considered to be a serious punitive offence within Malta, if a member of the public submits a complaint regarding a minor corruption practice of a police officer, the Internal Affairs Unit will investigate. Alternatively, where allegations regard serious police corruption offences, the Economic Crime Unit will intervene, investigate and may consequently initiate criminal proceedings. However, from 1998, there have been few cases of police officers charged with corruption offences, consisting of five bribery prosecutions and six unlawful arrest cases.

To further ensure societal security from police corruption, the Permanent Commission Against Corruption (PCAC) was established in 1988. The PCAC entirely deals with investigations for alleged or suspected police corruption practices. The PCAC comprises one chairman and two members who are selected by the President of Malta and act on the advice of the Prime Minister. Article 4 of Chapter 326 Permanent Commission Against Corruption Act 1988 highlights the functions of the commission, these include: considering and investigating alleged or suspected corrupt practices; investigating "the conduct of any public officer"; investigating "any person who is/has been entrusted with functions relating to the administration of a partnership where the Government has a controlling interest" and the Commission believes such conduct may be corrupt; investigating "practices and procedures of government departments where the Government has a controlling interest to facilitate the discovery of any corrupt practices"; and, to "instruct, advise and assist ministers who are entrusted with the administration of government departments where the government has a controlling interest on ways in which corrupt practices could be eliminated". Reports of the commission's findings are then submitted to the Minister of Justice.

==== Poland ====
===== History =====
During the mid 1990s, widespread police corruption in Poznań became heavily publicized in newspaper reports, which led to an investigation by central authorities. Poland's police chief and his deputy offered to resign after being implicated in the newspaper reports. The investigation and the deputy minister of internal affairs at the time stated that there were breaches of duty by police and it was found there were certain discrepancies in police operations. However, the deputy minister vouched that there was no actual evidence of corruption. Nevertheless, the public remained distrustful of Poland's institutions and towards the end of 1997, the minister of internal affairs and administration admitted that corruption was still a pervasive issue in the police force. Additionally, there are reports that Poland's traffic police engaged in bribery during the 1990s.

===== Present =====
Transparency International is a global non-governmental organisation that provides oversight of corruption in the corporate and political sphere and publishes comprehensive reports annually. It tracks public opinion on corruption with the Global Corruption Barometer, while the Corruption Perceptions Index derives its rankings of perceived levels of corruption from both public opinion surveys and expert assessments. Despite Poland being marked at a moderate level, it greatly falls behind its European counterparts such as Denmark, Finland, Sweden and Norway, who are all consistently in the top 10 countries with the lowest perceived levels of corruption. As of 2014, Poland currently holds a ranking of 35 out of 175 countries, marking an almost decade-long improvement in both score and ranking in the Index. The steady improvement can be attributed to Poland's efforts to combat corruption over the last decade, with the establishment of the Central Anticorruption Bureau (CBA) in 2006, their participation in the OECD Anti-Bribery Convention in 2000 and the subsequent slow adoption of anti-corruption policies.

However, over the last decade or so, there have been limited reports on Polish police corruption, which indicates that it is possibly underreported, as corruption is difficult to detect and measure due to its deceptive, hidden nature. Additionally, there is currently no specific legislation to protect whistleblowers. The CBA has training courses, which encourage officers to identify corruption, but there is a fear of retribution given the lack of legal protection. Furthermore, it is evident from reports and surveys that the population of Poland and the European Commission are still concerned with the issue of corruption throughout Poland's public institutions, including the police department. It is noted that Poland has made considerable progress towards the eradication of corruption; however, there is a compelling need to increase these efforts and implement necessary reforms.

===== The Central Anticorruption Bureau =====
The CBA specialises in the investigation of public officials and legal entities suspected of misconduct and fraudulent behaviour but does not wield the ability to prosecute defendants. Therefore, in order to be effective, the CBA exchanges information or evidence with the public prosecutors who possess executive powers. Moreover, this division of the Polish government has a responsibility that extends from the detection of corruption to crime prevention. In order to reduce the occurrence of corruption, the CBA conducts preventive and educational activities with the assistance of non-governmental organisations and financial support from the European Union. The efforts to remove corruption have pushed Poland to increase international cooperation, as global networking can result in the pooling and exchange of resources and knowledge. The Bureau has currently obtained permission from Poland's Prime Minister to cooperate with 50 other countries and 11 international organisations to tackle corruption on both a national and global scale.

The CBA continues to pursue its anti-corruption goal with its latest project, "Rising of the Anticorruption Training System", whereby over the course of three years from 2013 – 2015, the CBA has been working closely with specialised law enforcement agencies of Lithuania and Latvia. The project also consists of international anti-corruption training conferences whereby notable countries such as Norway and Denmark are able to share their high-standard practices with Poland. Additionally, the project has also taken advantage of technology by launching an e-learning platform that is equipped with anti-corruption education tools and online activities. The online platform is a training course designed to educate the general public and Polish working in both the government and business sectors. The key objective of this online platform is to provide an easily accessible set of educational tools that increases public awareness of corruption and informs the necessary steps to assist with its prevention and detection.

===== European Commission anti-corruption report =====
The European Commission provides a report on the level of corruption in each Member State and details the strengths and weaknesses of their anti-corruption policies. In the 2014 report on Poland, the European Commission acknowledged Poland's efforts but criticized Poland's successive governments for not appropriately prioritising the fight against corruption. For instance, Poland has had difficulty establishing anti-corruption policies, with its last one having expired in 2009. It was only after a few years of domestic and international pressure that the Polish government conducted consultations on a draft 2014-2019 Programme. Similar to the CPI, the European Commission conducts perception surveys and in 2013 found that 82% of Polish respondents believe corruption is prevalent in Poland and that 15% of Polish respondents have encountered bribery over the past 12 months.

The European Commission also has some reservations over the CBA, suggesting that the CBA may be negatively influenced by politics due to its strong political ties with powerful government officials, including the Prime Minister. The European Commission report has suggested that safeguards against politicization of the CBA should be strengthened with transparent and impartial recruitment processes. In addition, the report suggests that Poland needs to enact a long-term strategy against corruption to ensure successive governments remain committed to anti-corruption efforts

===== National Integrity System Assessment =====
Transparency International and the Institute of Public Affairs publish the National Integrity System Assessment (NIS) for each country, listing how it evaluates the capabilities of the country's key institutions to hinder the prevalence of corruption. According to the 2012 assessment, Transparency International notes that Poland has achieved a fairly satisfactory outcome and that corruption is not as problematic as it was during the mid-1990s after the collapse of Communism. Additionally, Poland's joining of the European Union in 2004 has placed expectations on Poland to improve the integrity of their political and corporate affairs. During 2002–2005, Poland is noted for implementing legal changes that extend punishment of corruption in Poland's Criminal Code. However, the assessment highlights that corruption in Poland is still a concern and must be addressed. The assessment asserts that a key component of Poland's relatively slow and small improvements in dealing with corruption is the lack of commitment from Poland's decision-makers as there have been several unsuccessful attempts to launch a comprehensive anti-corruption policy. NIS suggests that nepotism and cronyism is still prevalent in the political and corporate sphere, which provides a tolerant setting for corruption. The assessment also takes into consideration Poland's Corruption Perception Index, highlighting that the public's distrust of public entities and the difficulty in establishing effective anti-corruption policies has discouraged Poland's decision-makers from improving public relations.

==== Portugal ====
Portugal is recognized within the area of police corruption for its somewhat unsuccessful attempts in combating the ever-increasing images of corruption within governance and policing, through legislation. Though the ability for police services to protect individuals from crime is high and the mechanisms set in place to combat police corruption are extensive, citizens' confidence in police integrity is very low.

In accordance with Portugal's Criminal Code, the Unlawful Receiving of an Advantage can result in imprisonment for 3–5 years. Delving further, the Criminal Code also stipulates that Passive Corruption (conducted through an intermediary) and Active Corruption (conducted directly) can receive 1–8 years' imprisonment. Though there are minimal cases of police corruption occurring with this added legislation, Portuguese citizens' views on police corruption are in conflict, and the implementation of such administration appears non-existent.

Coming under the global microscope in 2007 for their efforts in the disappearance of Madeleine McCann, the Portuguese police force was heavily criticised and compared for their responses and actions after the abduction. In light of this, Portugal's policing system was opened up to international critique, and many shortfalls were found in its governance and follow-through of crime and criminal activity. Explanations for this inability to follow through and effectively punish offenders are varied, with heavy correlations built between trust within legal and political institutions. By the mid-1990s, moralisation within parliamentary procedures became highly controversial with voters, remaining tolerant of unethical behaviour due to a lack of response shown by parties to their electorate. This build-up in transparency and lack of trust ran alongside Portuguese citizens' understanding of government as well as the current police force.

The 2012 Transparency International report found that Portugal ranked 33rd in the list of nations facing high levels of corruption within its borders. Looking at national surveys, police corruption was seen as a part of everyday life, with Portuguese citizens accosted with daily reports of scandals in government, crimes that go unpunished, and obstacles within everyday investigations. Further surveys conducted amongst citizens found a consensus in which 75% of individuals agreed that governmental efforts to combat corruption are ineffective, and maintained a below-average trust of police officials.

In comparison to fellow nations within the European Union, Portugal has also seen a recent spike in social unrest surrounding the inability to trust police, with figures showing individuals believing police to be corrupt having spiked. Larger bodies such as the UN and GRECO have made recommendations to adapt the Criminal Code and develop a more detailed understanding of the responsibilities of policing officials in order to combat this. In accordance, the Portuguese Parliament has enacted a law as of 22 April 2015, where specifications were made on the corruption of international trade, sports activity, and bribery, with special attention to the protection of whistle-blowers in corruption-related matters. The implementation of this into everyday Portuguese life, however, is yet to be seen.

==== Romania ====
Over the past century, Romania has experienced political instability, including dictatorships, Soviet government control, and monarchies. It is a constitutional democracy.

According to Transparency International, 87% of people feel that from 2007 to 2010 the level of corruption in Romania increased after joining the EU in 2007, and 83% feel that their government's efforts to fight corruption are ineffective. On a scale of 1-5 (with 1 being not at all corrupt and 5 being extremely corrupt), Romanians rated both their political parties and their parliament and legislature as 4.5, and their police 3.9. This is relatively high for the European Union, especially compared to countries such as Denmark, which scored 2.8 for political parties, 2.3 for parliament and legislature and only a 2 for police. Another alarming statistic is that 28% of people in Romania reported paying a bribe in 2010.

There are two main Anti-Corruption Bodies in Romania: the National Anti-Corruption Directorate (DNA) and the National Integrity Agency (NIA). The former was created for "discovering, investigating and indicting high and medium level corruption cases" whilst the latter aims to "ensure the performance of public dignities and positions in conditions of impartiality, integrity and transparency". Since 2011, the NIA has also been a member of the European Partners against Corruption (EPAC), who are, among their many roles, the authorities responsible for corruption in regard to the national police.

Anti-fraud organizations have experienced fraud. In February 2015, the DNA prosecutors detained Ionut Vartic, the head of the Suceava Fight against Fraud Department (DLAF) for having used confidential information for private interests. Then, in March 2015, Horia Georgescu, director of Romania's NIA, was arrested on corruption charges. This news followed only days after Darius Valcov, the Romanian finance minister, resigned after being accused of accepting £1.4 million in bribes when he was a town mayor. Both maintain their innocence, but the cases do nothing to help Romania's reputation as "one of the EU's most corrupt states".

Yet Romania desires to gain admission into Europe's passport-free Schengen zone and thus is at least appearing to make an effort to reduce local and political crime and corruption. Romania is under enormous pressure from the European Commission to deal with their "graft culture" at the risk of losing EU aid funds. Official data revealed in 2009 alone that six magistrates, 22 police officers and five fiscal inspectors had been convicted of bribery on the grounds of having received bribes of between 100 and 45,000 euros. While most civilians denounce the government for the current state of police immorality in Romania, those from above blame the police forces for deliberately failing to produce evidence in court that would allow successful prosecution of corrupt businessmen and politicians.

In February 2015, Monica Iacob Ridzi, Romania's former sports and youth minister, was sentenced to five years in prison for abusing her position, overspending public money, illegally contracting private companies for goods and services and trying to delete allegedly incriminating e-mails.

Adam Clark, a journalist for the World Post, claims that Romania is "violently using its police forces against its own people". Given the state of corruption in Romania's government and anti-fraud agencies, this is not surprising. This statement is supported by Jennifer Baker from Revolution News, who reported on the violence used by riot police to suppress anti-corruption protestors in Bucharest following the passing of legislation that immunized the political class from corruption charges, criminalized critical speech, and criminalized demonstrations against government persecution. She states that protestors were accusing the police of protecting thieves. Furthermore, she reported that people living in villages where Chevron (an American multinational energy corporation) is searching for shale gas "were beaten in their houses" by riot police and were "arrested at random"

==== Slovakia ====
According to corruption watchdog Transparency International, Slovakia is the 17th most corrupt state within Europe and the 59th (out of 178) most corrupt state in the world. There has been heavy criticism of Slovakia for having corrupt political and justice systems. In particular, the Gorilla scandal led to a series of protests aimed at ending top-level government corruption.

In comparison to its neighbours, Slovakia has relatively little corruption within its police force and they are instead assigned the task of breaking the cycle of corruption in other official bodies. The police force consists of a special anti-corruption department, a specialized criminal court on corruption and special prosecution units. There are a series of laws in Slovakia in the Penal Code which aim to prohibit corruption within all areas of Slovak society. The Strategy of Crime and Prevention in the Slovak Republic (2007–2010) was also created to establish an Anti-Corruption Strategy. Within the EU Anti-Corruption Report (2014), the European Commission noted that there were many structural weaknesses in promoting the rule of law whilst Transparency International "considered the police force to be among the weakest institutions in Slovakia". This indicates the police force faces challenges in fighting corruption.

The inefficiencies of the police force in Slovakia would suggest that a certain level of corruption exists within its own structure. The Slovak Republic requested the World Bank and the United States Agency for International Development to complete diagnostic surveys of corruption in Slovakia. Surveys were conducted in households, enterprises and public offices and the results between the three survey groups showed similarities. They all agreed that the health system, the justice system, customs, the National Property Fund and the police were corrupt. Within police corruption, the surveys found that traffic police were the ones to be held accountable for the most corruption. From 388 household respondents, 37% claimed to have paid a bribe to a police officer at least once, while 19% claimed to have done so several times. Moreover, the United States Department of State Country Report on Slovakia found that there were 11 serious cases of police corruption in 2011. The most common form of police corruption within Slovakia is the extortion of bribes, which predominantly occurs at traffic stops.

The low rate of police corruption in Slovakia – besides the traffic police – suggests that the extensive laws against corruption act as a deterrent for police officers. While the level of corruption within the justice system in Slovakia remains quite high, corruption in the police force remains somewhat confined to traffic police and their extortion of minor bribes.

==== Slovenia ====
Contemporary concerns about police corruption are largely reflected by public opinion, which demonstrates widespread consensus that corruption within all public sectors is a "very big problem" in Slovenia. The 2013 Special Eurobarometer on Corruption showed that 76% (the second highest percentage in the EU) of Slovenian participants believed there had been an increase in corruption in the last three years. Furthermore, public opinion suggests that police corruption in particular is a significant issue with much concern over bribery, and abuse of power for personal gain amongst Slovenian police officers.

Initially, Slovenian legislation did not provide for corruption as a separate offence distinguished from other forms of crime. Corruption is not used as a legal term in Slovenia; instead, the legislation provides for each offence individually as a criminal act. The Prevention of Corruption Act, adopted in 2004, defines corruption as "ever trespassing of the obligated treatment of official or responsible subject in the private or public sector, as well as the treatment of subjects that are initiators of violators, or subjects that can benefit from the violations". Changes within the organisation of policing in Slovenia were brought about initially by the 1991 Constitution, in line with political changes towards a more democratic system with a greater sensitivity towards human rights. These changes, along with the birth of the Constitutional Court to enforce these, brought about strict limitations on the powers of the police to search and seize, as well as more emphasis on the protection of privacy and fundamental rights in criminal proceedings. The judicial control over police powers was further strengthened in the Police Act of 1998, later reinforced by the New Organisation and Work of the Police Act 2013. These acts provide specifically for instances of police corruption. Additionally, the 2013 Act allowed an individual to file a direct complaint against a police officer if they thought the act, or failure to act, of the officer violated human rights or fundamental freedoms.

Following the cases of Rehblock v Slovenia (2000) and Matko v Slovenia (2006), a department for the prosecution of officials with special authorisations was established, which removed any police involvement in the investigation of other officers suspected of committing criminal offences. Since this recent introduction, there has been increased investigation and action taken for police offenders. In 2011, the department conducted 80 investigations, out of which 19 police officers were dismissed as a result of suspicion of committing a criminal offence.

Lobnikar and Meško (2015) found that within a sample of 550 Slovenian police officers, 23.6% agreed that covering up a police DUI was 'not all that serious'. Additionally, 34% of respondents claimed that they would not report another police officer who had engaged in conduct such as receiving free meals, gifts from merchants, police DUI and verbal abuse. While this study demonstrated a trend in Slovenian police officers to ignore less serious forms of police corruption, there is agreement (59.1-75%) that police integrity within the Slovenian police work environment is generally high.

Within the wider context of the European Union, corruption continues to be an economic burden. Aside from the consequences within each member state, corruption reduces levels of investment, obstructs the fair operation of the Internal Market and has a negative impact on public finances. It is estimated that approximately 1% of the EU GDP is made up of economic costs incurred by corruption. Specifically, an estimated loss of between 1.5 and 2% of the Slovenian GDP is incurred as a result of corruption. Slovenia has administered substantial improvements to their legal framework to address the issue of police corruption among Central and Eastern European Member States. However, issues with the effective enforcement of these anti-corruption measures remain, due to "weak control mechanisms" administered by the government. Lobnikar's and Meško's 2015 survey demonstrates a high level of police integrity strictly connected to the 'code of silence' in the police community. Therefore, anti-corruption strategies related to changing perceptions and moral beliefs about the seriousness of corruptive police conduct may be the most effective at improving Slovenia's anti-corruption enforcement.

==== Spain ====
In the Global Corruption Barometer 2013 report conducted by Transparency International, Spain ranked 37th out of 175 countries (1st being the least corrupt) on the Corruption Perception Index, with the highest form of corruption being political at 4.4%. The 3rd highest was police corruption at 3.1%. Under the Spanish Constitution, corruption is defined as where a holder of public authority or public official who solicits or receives a gift or offer for carrying out in the course of his duties, for his own gain or for the benefit of others, an act or omission which constitutes an offence shall be liable to imprisonment for 2 to 6 years.

Since 1996, on average per year, there have been 25 reported police corruption cases to the media.

As a member of the European Partners Against Corruption (EPAC), a document was released in November 2011 about the Policing Oversight Principles, which for Spain is the Inspectorate of Personnel and Security Services, which oversees the enforcement of these policing principles of the above bodies:

The highest standard of policing, respect for the rule of law and human rights in all policing activities, greater public confidence in policing, proper systems of accountability for police officers and other law enforcement officials, effective redress for those who are victims of police misconduct, greater openness and understanding of policing by citizens, systems to ensure that lessons are learnt from incidents and errors, greater respect for the law, policing and as a consequence reductions in criminality.

However, according to Freelance Journalist Guy Hedgecoe, "corruption [has] been accepted as a part of Spanish everyday life".

==== United Arab Emirates ====
Police in the UAE have abused those in their custody and sometimes this abuse has led to death. The Abu Dhabi Police allegedly assisted Sheikh Issa bin Zayed Al Nahyan in a 2009 torture incident. The Police are also alleged to have used excessive force on critics and protesters.

==== United Kingdom ====
A 2011 report by Transparency International concluded that although corruption is not endemic, it is a much greater problem than recognised and that there was an inadequate response to its growing threat. The report also found that the response to corruption from British institutions was often underwhelming and failed to adequately address the issues. A 2015 report by Her Majesty's Inspectorate of Constabulary (HMIC) on the capability of British institutions to tackle police corruption argued that progress had been made in combating corruption since 2011, noting that allegations of misconduct and corruption inside the police force are being taken seriously, and that superior officers displayed strong ethical commitments to tackling corruption. However, the report also condemned the relatively large number of investigations where no further action was taken, roughly two-thirds of all investigations. HMIC Mike Cunningham noted that many cases of police corruption are dropped due to being unfounded; however, they believed many cases had not been adequately investigated. Officers were also shown to lack confidence in the anonymity and mechanisms in place for reporting the misconduct of peers, which hinders the ability of institutions to effectively identify and combat police corruption.

In the UK, the Independent Police Complaints Commission (IPCC) is responsible for overseeing the system of handling complaints made against police officers in England and Wales, while these duties are handled by the Police Ombudsman for Northern Ireland (OPONI) in Northern Ireland, and the Police Investigations and Review Commissioner (PIRC) in Scotland. These agencies can manage or supervise police investigations into corruption, conduct independent investigations into the most serious cases, and can refer cases for prosecution should enough evidence be found to form a case.

A 2012 report into police corruption in England and Wales by the IPCC noted the prevalence of the serious offences referred to them from 2008 to 2011: perverting the course of justice (33%), theft or fraud (30%), abuse of authority (15%), unauthorised disclosure of information (13%), and misuse of systems (9%). The IPCC received 837 referrals during this period, mostly from British citizens. 47 cases were referred for prosecution, resulting in ten prison sentences, one suspended sentence and one fine. As a result of all investigations into the corruption and misconduct of British police and staff between 1 April 2013 and 31 March 2014, 134 police officers and staff were dismissed, while a further 711 faced disciplinary sanctions. 103 Metropolitan Police officers were also suspended during this period. Offences included drug-related offences, bribery, theft or fraud, sexual misconduct, and information disclosure, where information disclosure and theft or fraud were the most common offences. The Directorate of Professional Standards considers the "exploitation of staff through inappropriate relationships with journalists, private investigators and criminals" the biggest threat to police integrity.

On 27 June 2012 the Home Affairs Committee announced an inquiry into the IPCC including, but not limited to, analysis of the independence of the commission, the powers and responsibilities of the commission and the effectiveness of Commission investigations. The committee began hearing evidence on 17 July 2012. The report was published on 29 January 2013 and was scathing, describing it as "woefully underequipped and hamstrung in achieving its original objectives. Nothing has been changed as a result of this report. It concluded that the supposed independent body has neither the powers nor the resources that it needs to get to the truth when the integrity of the police is in doubt."

In 2014, newspaper The Independent published a leaked 2002 Metropolitan Police report which indicated that criminals used Freemasonry connections to recruit corrupt officers.

==== United States ====
Grand juries often decline to seek charges for U.S. police officers involved in violent activity due to the violent nature of policing, though some U.S. police have faced killing charges. Corruption cases and other non-violent crimes are more likely to be prosecuted.

==== Uzbekistan ====
Corruption within the Uzbek police force has been described as "pervasive." Extortion is common, and police regularly use false charges to dissuade anyone from reporting their corruption crimes to higher bureaus. A 2014 report stated that police corruption had risen recently owing to the currency exchange market coming under the control of known criminal groups.

==== Venezuela ====
Venezuela's corruption includes widespread corruption in the police force. Criminologists and experts have stated that low wages and lack of police supervision have been attributed to police corruption. Many victims are afraid to report crimes to the police because many officers are involved with criminals and may bring even more harm to the victims. Human Rights Watch has reported that the "police commit one of every five crimes" and that thousands of people have been killed by police officers acting with impunity; only 3% of officers have been charged in cases against them. The Metropolitan Police force in Caracas was so corrupt that it was disbanded and was even accused of assisting in many of the 17,000 kidnappings.

The Corruption Perceptions Index, produced annually by the NGO Transparency International (TNI) ranked Venezuela among the most corrupt countries in the world A 2013 survey by TNI in 2013 found that 68% of those believed that the government's efforts to fight corruption were ineffective; a majority of those surveyed said the government's effort against corruption were ineffective, that corruption had increased from 2007 to 2010, and perceived political parties, the judiciary, the parliament and the police to be the institutions most affected by corruption.

== Noble cause corruption ==
Noble cause corruption, as ethical corruption, is a departure from conventional discussions on police corruption, which typically focus on monetary corruption. According to the field of Police Ethics, noble cause corruption is police misconduct "committed in the name of good ends." In Police Ethics, it is argued that some of the best officers are often the most susceptible to noble cause corruption. According to professional policing literature, noble cause corruption includes "planting or fabricating evidence, lying or the fabrication and manipulation of facts on reports or through testimony in court, and generally abusing police authority to make a charge stick." According to Robert Reiner, a professor at the London School of Economics, stops based on statistical discrimination are also a form of noble cause corruption.

Many police officers who take bribes believe they are providing a public service.

== Effects ==
Police corruption affects society, including political, economic, and sociological. The social aspect is perhaps easiest to define, because even one corrupt officer in a department can generate an overall distrust of the department (the Rotten Apple theory). This negative outlook on policing by civilians helps maintain an "us versus them" mentality among police, which only serves to further the rift between police officers and civilians.

Police corruption, when brought to the public eye, increases pressures on departments by lawmakers to enact change from within. In 2013, the West Valley City, Utah police's narcotics unit was disbanded due to rampant corruption among its officers. These officers were found stealing small items from seized vehicles, taking evidence, and placing tracking devices on potential suspects' vehicles without warrants. This action, like many others, not only increases distrust among the public, but lawmakers begin to feel pressure from the masses to remove officers and revamp entire departments.

=== Political ===
==== Civilian involvement ====
Civilians within the jurisdiction look to lawmakers and justice officials to enact justice against the officers involved. If the instance of corruption happens to fall on an election year, their re-election campaign may be lost.

In areas such as Afghanistan, media exposure and civilian involvement in combating corruption is rarely seen. Rather, international officials step in to help eliminate corruption in the department.

==== Top-down discipline ====
Depending on the number of people involved and severity of the acts, the state executive or legislature may be compelled to demand that the department be scrutinized and its policies corrected. This can involve replacing individual officers, mid-level leadership, or asking for a resignation by the department chief. Disciplinary actions depend on the severity of the act, but typically result in disciplinary actions by the department and negative media coverage for the department. In 1970, the New York City Knapp Commission began holding officers and supervision accountable and instituting real disciplinary actions for police corruption. In countries where corruption is a major issue, such as China and Russia, state government is often directly involved in investigating and disciplining cases of corruption, such as in the Chongqing gang trials, where police chief Wen Qiang was detained and put on trial for accepting bribes, rape, and other crimes during the Chongqing gang crackdown.

=== Social ===
==== General distrust of police in the community ====
While political issues can easily be worked through, the social effect of police corruption is much harder to overcome. Civilians, especially those who know someone who has been victimized by certain types of corruption, tend to see police officers as enemy forces. Similarly, police officers view civilians in the same light. Both issues have only been exacerbated by the war on crime and war on drugs. The "us versus them" mentality is especially prevalent among inner city minorities, where stereotyping and racial targeting seem to be the norm.

==== Rotten apple theory ====
This theory suggests that one bad cop ruins the entire department. A single officer can not only cause leadership to initiate investigations over entire sections or the department as a whole, but one corrupt officer/the rotten apple can bring a generally appreciated department to its knees in terms of public relations. People look at that one bad cop and assume, sometimes correctly (especially in this case, where several other officers were found to be committing similar violations) the entire department is corrupt and committing similar or worse acts. A 2019 study in the journal Nature backs up this theory, finding that misconduct by one police officer substantially increased the likelihood that peer officers would also engage in misconduct. The article uses the metaphor of a contagion.

==== Reduced effectiveness ====
Police corruption not only generates distrust among the public, but undermines the criminal justice system as a whole. Judges and prosecutors may develop a negative opinion of officers who come to testify in cases, especially those who have a history of disciplinary action related to corrupt acts. The trustworthiness of officers who work in departments where corruption has been discovered is severely diminished, and even if the testimony they provide in court is an exact recollection of the events in question, a prosecutor or judge may choose to simply ignore these facts because of their association with a seemingly corrupt department. In the case of the Waldo Police Department located in Florida, the entire department was disbanded partly due to allegations of corruption, meaning county law enforcement must take over where the city failed.

=== Economic ===
==== Officer training ====
Should the corrupt act not be extremely severe, or the department decide that discharge of the officer is unnecessary, those involved in corrupt acts may be charged to undergo remedial training. This could be inside or outside the department, and becomes another red mark on the already strapped budget of most departments. The cost of this remedial training pales in comparison to the cost of having to train new officers to replace those who are relieved of their duties, since these new hires will need to undergo initial academy training as well as whatever additional training the officer would require as they advanced in their career.

==== Investigations ====
Investigation and litigation costs may be high. These investigators are either part of their own department or taken from other squads (county sheriff investigating a city department, for example), or can be private entities. The department must also invest in retaining attorneys for both themselves and the officers involved.

== In popular culture ==
There are numerous depictions of police corruption in the media.

=== Documentaries ===
- Stasi Legacy: Germany's Records of Repression (2011) (People & Power, Al Jazeera) is about the infamous Stasi secret police of communist East-Germany.
- The BBC documentary Can We Trust The Police? (2012) is about police corruption, police brutality and police incompetence.
- The Invisible War (2012) is about rapists in the US military
- The BBC documentary Hacking: Power, Corruption and Lies (2014) about the Rupert Murdoch News International phone hacking scandal is about spying, espionage, hacking, police corruption, political corruption, media manipulation and abuse of power. It is also about democracy vs. fascist corporatism in the form of oligarchy, plutocracy, elitism and kleptocracy.
- Deepcut: The Army's Shame (2016) is about rapists in the British army
- The Gestapo: Hitler's secret police (1991) The Geheime Staatspolizei, abbreviated Gestapo, was the official secret police of Nazi Germany and in German-occupied Europe. The force was created by Hermann Göring in 1933 by combining the various political police agencies of Prussia into one organisation. The Gestapo was a notorious organization tasked with destroying political opponents of the Nazi movement, suppressing any opposition to Nazi policies, and persecuting Jews. From its origins as a Prussian intelligence organization, it grew into a sprawling and greatly feared apparatus of oppression. Heinrich Himmler was given command over Göring's Gestapo in 1934. Himmler, in addition to his position as head of the SS, took control of all German police forces, including the Ordnungspolizei (German: "Order Police"), with his appointment as Reichsführer SS and chief of the German police.
- Cops on Trial (2021) is about police officers who are rapists
- Police on Trial (2022)

=== Films ===
- The films Lee Rock (1991), Lee Rock II (1991) and Dark Blue (2002) show corrupt chiefs of police and corrupt police officers who take bribes and control protection racket just like the mafia.
- Actor Zakes Mokae played the roles of corrupt police men in several movies.
- Z (1969)
- The Plot (aka The French Conspiracy) (1972)
- I as in Icarus (1979)
- Hidden Agenda (1990) shows corrupt chiefs of police, corrupt police officers, corrupt intelligence/spy agencies (MI5, CIA) and corrupt special forces who murder innocent civilians. It also shows corrupt politicians.
- Bad Lieutenant (1992) is a character study of a corrupt police officer.
- The Net (1995)
- The Siege (1998) with Denzel Washington and Bruce Willis shows U.S. Army corruption, intelligence/spy agency (CIA) corruption, and high-tech espionage technology to oppress civilian populations.
- Enemy of the State (1998) with Will Smith, Gene Hackman, Jon Voight, and Lisa Bonet.
- The 1998 movie The Negotiator is about police corruption.
- Infernal Affairs (2002–2003)
- The Departed (2006)
- The Lives of Others (2006) is about the infamous Stasi secret police of communist East Germany. A Hollywood remake was planned, but it was never made. In February 2007, Sydney Pollack and Anthony Minghella announced a deal with The Weinstein Company to produce and direct an English-language remake of The Lives of Others. Minghella died in March 2008 and Pollack died less than three months later.
- The film Overheard (2009) shows police officers who abuse their power and high-tech espionage technology to profit financially from spying.
- Une affaire d'état (aka "State Affair"s, aka "Staatsfeinde" – "Mord auf höchster Ebene") (2009)
- City of Damnation (2009)
- Ip Man 2 (2010)
- Sicario (2015) Multiple officers are suspected and assumed to be corrupted due to the widespread of law enforcement officers that have been bought or bribed by the Mexican Cartels.
- Hot Pursuit (2015)
- Master Z: Ip Man Legacy (2018)
- Sicario: Day of the Soldado (2018)
- 21 Bridges (2019)
- The Batman (2022)
- Rebel Ridge (2024)

=== Television ===
- Line of Duty is a British TV show (first aired in 2012 with a sixth series ongoing as of March 2021) that deals exclusively with police corruption types on multiple levels.
- The Net (1998–1999)
- Ray Donovan on Showtime depicts corruption at the local and federal levels while Chicago P.D. on NBC depicts corruption in a major U.S. city.
- The Shield (2002–2007)
- Secret State (2012)
- The first episode of Season 1 in Death in Paradise reveals that Sgt Lily Thompson (Lenora Crichlow) was a corrupt police officer.

=== Video Games ===
- Batman: Arkham Origins
- Battlefield Hardline
- Disco Elysium
- Grand Theft Auto III
- Grand Theft Auto IV
- Grand Theft Auto V
- Grand Theft Auto: San Andreas
- L.A. Noire
- Master Detective Archives: Rain Code
- Max Payne

== See also ==
=== People ===
- Adrian Schoolcraft
- Ali Dizaei
- Andre Stander
- Antoinette Frank
- Brian Liddy
- Buford Pusser
- Charles Becker
- David Mack
- Edwin Atherton
- Eliot Ness
- Erich Mielke
- Frank McKetta
- Frank Serpico
- Issa bin Zayed Al Nahyan
- Jackie Selebi
- Jari Aarnio
- John Connolly
- Kevin Gaines
- Louis Eppolito and Stephen Caracappa
- Nino Durden
- Rafael Perez
- Richie Roberts
- Robert Leuci
- Roger Rogerson
- Terry Lewis
- Big Tom Brown
- William King and Antonio Murray

=== Topics ===
- 1992 Los Angeles riots
- Copwatch
- False arrest
- Falsification of Evidence
- Fitzgerald Inquiry
- Hofstadter Committee, also known as the Seabury Commission
- Independent Commission Against Corruption
- Intimidation
- Knapp Commission
- Lexow Committee
- Metropolitan Police role in Hacking Scandal
- Mexican drug war
- Mollen Commission
- Operation Countryman
- Operation Guard Shack
- Operation Tiberius
- Police accountability
  - Police body camera
- Police brutality
- Police misconduct
- Police perjury
- Political corruption
- Rampart scandal
- Surveillance abuse
- Wickersham report
