= Jääskeläinen =

Jääskeläinen is a Finnish surname. Notable people with the surname include:

- Ilkka Jääskeläinen, Finnish musician
- Jari Jääskeläinen, Finnish ice hockey player
- Jarmo Jääskeläinen (1937–2022), Finnish journalist and documentary maker
- Jussi Jääskeläinen, retired Finnish football goalkeeper
- Oula Jääskeläinen, Finnish figure skater
- Pietari Jääskeläinen, Finnish politician
- Sulo Jääskeläinen, Finnish skier
- Yrjö Jääskeläinen (Yrjö Tapani Jääskeläinen) (born 1956), Finnish wheelchair curler, 2018 Winter Paralympian

Originally a Savonian surname, the name literally means "of/from Jääski" and was originally given to people who moved from Jääski to Savonia.
