= Jalmari =

Jalmari is a Finnish male given name which derives from the Old Norse male name Hjalmar or Hjálmarr (hjalmr 'helmet' + arr 'warrior/army').

Notable people with the name Jalmari include:

- Jalmari Eskola (1886–1958), Finnish athlete of cross country
- Jalmari Haapanen (1882–1961), Finnish politician
- Jalmari Helander (born in 1976), Finnish screenwriter and film director
- Jalmari Holopainen (1892–1954), Finnish footballer
- Jalmari Jaakkola (1885–1964), Finnish historian and professeur
- Jalmari Kivenheimo (1889–1994), Finnish gymnast
- Jalmari Kovanen (1877–1936), Finnish politician
- Jalmari Linna (1891–1954), Finnish politician
- Jalmari Malmi (1893–1943), Finnish politician
- Jalmari Parikka (1891–1959), Finnish revolutionary soldier
- Jalmari Rötkö (1892–1938), Finnish politician
- Jalmari Ruokokoski (1886–1936), Finnish Expressionist painter
- Jalmari Sauli (1889–1957), Finnish writer and athlete
- Jalmari Väisänen (1893–1983), Finnish politician
- Jalmari Viljanen (1872–1928), Finnish politician

== See also ==
- Kaarlo Jalmari Tuominen (1908–2006), Finnish runner athlete
