= Jary =

Jary or Jarý may refer to:

== People ==
- Michael Jary (1906–1988), German composer
- Milan Jarý (born 1952), Czech cross-country skier
- Norm Jary (1929–2021), Canadian mayor and broadcaster
- Sydney Jary (1924–2019), British army officer
- Vladimír Jarý (born 1947), Czech handball player

== Locations ==
- Jary, Bydgoszcz, a neighbourhood in Bydgoszcz, Kuyavian–Pomeranian Voivodeship, Poland
- Jary, Warsaw, a neighbourhood in Warsaw, Masovian Voivodeship, Poland
- Jary, Lower Silesian Voivodeship, a village in the Lower Silesian Voivodeship, Poland
- Wilcze Jary, a village in Kuyavian–Pomeranian Voivodeship, Poland

== See also ==
- Jari (disambiguation)
- Jarry (disambiguation)
