= Jarry =

Jarry may refer to:

== Places ==
- Jarry station, a station of the Montreal Metro (subway), Canada
- Jarry Street, a street in Montreal

== People with the surname ==
- Alfred Jarry (1873–1907), French writer
- Gérard Jarry (1936–2004), French violinist
- Isabelle Jarry (born 1959), French writer
- Nicolás Jarry Fillol (born 1995), Chilean tennis player
- Nicolas Jarry (calligrapher) (1620–1674), French calligrapher
- Rachel Jarry (born 1991), Australian basketball player
- Raoul Jarry (1885–1930), Canadian politician and City Councillor in Montreal, Quebec
- Tristan Jarry, (born 1995), Canadian ice hockey goaltender

== See also ==
- Jari (disambiguation)
- Jary (disambiguation)
- Z.I. Jarry, a commercial/light-industrial suburb of Pointe-à-Pitre, Guadeloupe
- Jarry Park, an urban park in Montreal, Canada
- Jarry Park Stadium, a former baseball stadium in Montreal, Canada
