= Jarri, Fars =

Jarri جري
- Village
- Location within Iran
- Coordinates: 27°18′13″N 53°17′50″E
- Country: Iran
- Province: Fars
- County: Lamerd
- Bakhsh: Central
- Rural District: Sigar

Population (2006)
  - Total: 442
- Time zone: UTC+3:30 (IRST)
  - Summer (DST): UTC+4:30 (IRDT)

Jarri (Persian: جري, also Romanized as Jarrī and Jarī) is a village in Sigar Rural District, in the Central District of Lamerd County, Fars province, Iran. At the 2006 census, its population was 442, in 90 families.
