= Jari Aarnio =

Finnish police officer (born 1957)

- Born: September 5, 1957 (age 68); Helsinki, Finland
- Known for: Former head of Helsinki's anti-drug police

Jari Seppo Aarnio (born 5 September 1957) is the former head of Helsinki's anti-drugs police. He was given a 13-year prison sentence for drug crimes and other offences.

Aarnio spent 30 years in the anti-drugs force. He grew up in a Maunula suburb of Helsinki, and became a police officer in 1979. He was a chief investigator in a case against "drug baron" Miika Kortekallio in 1986. Kortekallio was sentenced to jail; Aarnio wrote his thesis about the Kortekallio case. He was named "Policeman of the year" in 1987.

== Drug trafficking and corruption charges ==
During 2011 and 2012, Aarnio abused his position by helping a gang smuggle and sell 800 kg of hashish into Finland. He also threatened a suspect, and tried to frame an innocent man for being in charge of the drug ring. He also used his position and experience to try to mislead his colleagues and to conceal evidence.

In September 2016, Aarnio was given a three-year sentence in corruption charges which involved a security company called "Trevoc". The company's products were used by the Helsinki Police Department, the Finnish Customs, the National Bureau of Investigation of Finland and the Foreign ministry. A lower court had given Aarnio a 20-month sentence, but the Court of Appeal raised it to three years. According to the court's verdict, Aarnio had a financial interest in the company and he influenced the officials' decision to buy the company's products. The company's ownership was kept secret from the buyers, and the deal involved the leader of "United Brotherhood", a Finnish crime syndicate.

In December 2016, Aarnio was sentenced to ten years in the drug case. Combined with the Trevoc verdict, his full sentence was 13 years. As a first-timer he was to serve half of the sentence, and because he had already been in custody for two years, he was to serve 4.5 years.

In 2017, Aarnio appealed to overturn his prison sentence. The Court of Appeal upheld the conviction, and the Supreme Court of Finland later denied his last appeal.

== Murder charge ==
In July 2018, Aarnio was accused of murder. He had allegedly failed to prevent a planned murder of which he had knowledge of in 2003. In December 2020, he was sentenced to life in prison for the murder of Volkan Ünsal, but the conviction was overturned on appeal in February 2022.

In March 2022, the Deputy Prosecutor General of Finland filed an appeal to the Supreme Court, because there were no precedents for such cases. According to the prosecutors, Aarnio had prior knowledge of the murder, and as a police officer he should have tried to prevent it.

== Released from prison ==
Soon after Aarnio's murder conviction was overturned he was released from prison on supervised parole. In June 2022, his parole ended.

== See also ==
- Police corruption in Finland
