= Jari Poutiainen =

Finnish footballer (born 1966)

Personal information
- Date of birth: 29 August 1966 (age 60)
- Height: 1.82 m (6 ft 0 in)
- Position: Goalkeeper

Senior career*
Years	Team	Apps	(Gls)
1983–1987	Koparit	83	(0)
1988	KuPS	27	(0)
1989–1990	Hammarby	29	(0)
1992?–1995	Syrianska FC		

International career
1988	Finland	1	(0)
- * Club domestic league appearances and goals

Jari Poutiainen (born 29 August 1966) is a retired Finnish football goalkeeper.
