= Independent Commission Against Corruption =

Independent Commission or Commissioner Against Corruption may refer to:

- Independent Commission Against Corruption (Mauritius), established in 2002
- Independent Commission Against Corruption (Hong Kong), established in 1974

- Commissioner of the Independent Commission Against Corruption, a post in Hong Kong

- Independent Commission Against Corruption (New South Wales), Australia, established in 1988
- Independent Commissioner Against Corruption (Northern Territory), Australia, established in 2018
- Independent Commission Against Corruption (South Australia), established in 2013
- Fiji Independent Commission Against Corruption, established 2007
- Korea Independent Commission Against Corruption, established in 2002, merged into Anti-Corruption and Civil Rights Commission in 2008

== See also ==
- Commission Against Corruption of Macau, established in 1999.
- Commission for the Prevention of Corruption of the Republic of Slovenia
