= Jari Neugebauer =

German ice hockey player

- Born: 21 October 1994 (age 30); Berlin, Germany
- Height: 1.75 m (5 ft 9 in)
- Weight: 85 kg (187 lb; 13 st 5 lb)
- Position: Forward
- Shoots: Left
- Oberliga team Former teams: EV Lindau Islanders; Höchstadter EC
- Playing career: 2012–present

Jari Neugebauer (born 21 October 1994 in Berlin) is a German professional ice hockey player. He currently plays for EV Lindau Islanders in the Oberliga (German 3rd Ice Hockey League).
