= Jari, Kerman =

Jari جري
- Village
- Location within Iran
- Coordinates: 27°59′21″N 58°31′54″E
- Country: Iran
- Province: Kerman
- County: Rudbar-e Jonubi
- Bakhsh: Jazmurian
- Rural District: Kuhestan

Population (2006)
  - Total: 44
- Time zone: UTC+3:30 (IRST)
  - Summer (DST): UTC+4:30 (IRDT)

Jari (Persian: جري, also Romanized as Jārī and Jarrī) is a village in Kuhestan Rural District, Jazmurian District, Rudbar-e Jonubi County, Kerman Province, Iran. At the 2006 census, its population was 44, in 7 families.
