= Jari Nikkilä =

Finnish footballer (born 1989)

Personal information
- Date of birth: 16 August 1989 (age 37)
- Place of birth: Finland
- Height: 1.79 m (5 ft 10 1/2 in)
- Position: Centre back

Youth career
- TPV

Senior career*
Years	Team	Apps	(Gls)
2004–2007	TPV	31	(0)
2008–2009	Haka	29	(0)
2010–2011	Tampere United	0	(0)
2011	→ TPV (loan)	11	(2)
2012–2013	Ilves	56	(2)
2014–2016	Haka	49	(0)
2016–2020	TPV	69	(4)
2019	→ Tampere United (loan)	7	(0)
2022–2023	Ilves-Kissat	38	(0)
- * Club domestic league appearances and goals as of 17 October 2024

Jari Nikkilä is a Finnish professional footballer.

== See also ==
- Football in Finland
- List of football clubs in Finland
