= Usko Laukkanen =

- Born: 27 February 1930; Helsinki, Finland
- Died: 5 January 2000 (aged 69); Helsinki, Finland
- Occupations: Children's writer, illustrator, cartoonist, animator
- Writing career
- Notable awards: Topelius Prize (1957); Puupäähattu (1988)

Usko Laukkanen (27 February 1930 Helsinki – 5 January 2000 Helsinki) was a Finnish commercial graphic designer, book illustrator, animator, and cartoonist.

He is best known as an illustrator of children's fairy tales and textbooks, as well as a comic book artist. In 1957, he was awarded the prestigious Finnish literary Topelius Prize. In 1988, he received the Puupäähattu award, which is the main recognition for comic artists in Finland, presented by the Finnish Comics Society.

Laukkanen started drawing comic strips at the age of 15, and his first comic Masa ja Pena appeared in Seura magazine. In 1948, Laukkanen won the domestic selection for an international youth travel poster competition and received an honorable mention in the final competition.

Usko Laukkanen was a versatile illustrator and comic creator. He is perhaps best known for his illustrations in many children's books and textbooks. A whole generation grew up using books like Lasten oma aapinen (Children's Own ABC Book) and Lasten oma lukukirja (Children's Own Reader) (1958) along with their sequels, as well as other school textbooks made for Otava and Valistus publishers.

Laukkanen's written and illustrated book Laulumaja (1956) also attracted attention. It placed third in a Nordic picture book competition and was published as the only domestic work in Tammi's Little Golden Books series, and was translated into several countries.

Later, Laukkanen also worked as a commercial illustrator (e.g., for Liikenneturva, Postipankki) and animator (e.g., the Esso "Put a Tiger in Your Tank" advertisement in the 1960s). Towards the end of his career, his most prominent employer was the Tampere-based Satukustannus, for which he created dozens of picture books between the 1970s and 1990s, some of which were also translated into Russian and Swedish. He also created advertisements, magazine covers, record sleeves, and postcards.

Laukkanen received the Finnish Comics Society's Puupäähattu award in 1988 for his comic Masto & Märssy, which he had been drawing since 1953. In addition to making comics, he illustrated numerous children's and young adult books and designed book covers.

Laukkanen was granted a state artist pension in 1991.

== Works ==
=== Children's fiction and picture books ===
- Laulumaja(The Song Cabin); written and illustrated by Usko Laukkanen. Tammi 1956, 4th edition 2010.
- Panu Ponteva ja taikatyttö (Panu Ponteva and the Magic Girl). Satukustannus 1986.
- Metsänpeikot opintiellä (The Forest Trolls on the Path to Learning). Satukustannus 1986.
- Linus Linlugg och den talande tavlan (Linus Linlugg and the Talking Picture) – Swedish edition. Due donne 1986.
- Kuhnu, kimalainen (Kuhnu the Bumblebee). Satukustannus 1987.
- Meripeikot liikenteessä (The Sea Trolls in Traffic). Satukustannus 1987.
- Sami, sammakko (Sami the Frog). Satukustannus 1987.
- Tupsu, orava (Tupsu the Squirrel). Satukustannus 1987.
- Etsivä Wictor ja kadonnut taulu (Detective Wictor and the Missing Picture). Satukustannus 1988.
- Panu Ponteva ja puhuva taulu (Panu Ponteva and the Talking Picture). Satukustannus 1988.
- Panu Ponteva seikkailee (The Adventures of Panu Ponteva). Satukustannus 1990.

=== Comic strips ===
- Masa ja Pena (Masa and Pena) – published in Seura magazine (debut at age 15).
- Masto & Märssy (Masto and Märssy) – long-running maritime comic strip (drawn since 1953, awarded the Puupäähattu in 1988).

=== Major textbook illustrations ===
- Lasten oma aapinen (Children's Own ABC Book) – published by Otava / Valistus.
- Lasten oma lukukirja (Children's Own Reader) – Otava / Valistus, 1958 (and subsequent sequels).
- Lukutunnin kirja (The Reading Lesson Book) – series of school textbooks for primary education.

=== ABC books and primers ===
- Kurren ja jänön aapinen (The Squirrel and Rabbit Primer). Satukustannus 1985.
- Metsänväen aapiskirja (The ABC Book of the Forest Folk). Satukustannus 2009 (posthumous).

=== Illustrations for other authors ===
- Punainen minuutti ja muita tarinoita Pete-Veikosta (The Red Minute and Other Stories of Pete-Veikko) – text by Iris Kähäri, illustrated by Usko Laukkanen, 1957.

=== Awards ===
- Topelius Prize (1957)
- Puupäähattu (1988)

== Sources ==
- Finnish Comics Society: Usko Laukkanen (Archived – Internet Archive)
