= Jalmari Väisänen =

Finnish politician

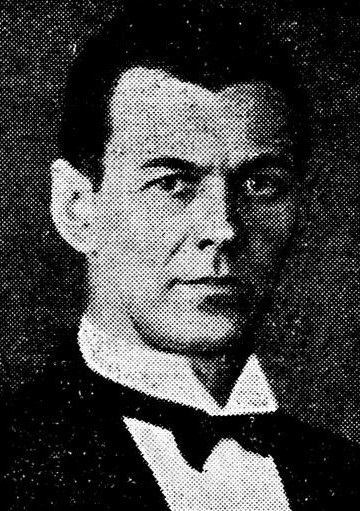
Jalmari Väisänen

Jalmari Väisänen (30 January 1893, Kotka – 10 July 1983) was a Finnish farmer and politician. He was a Member of the Parliament of Finland from 1929 to 1945 and again from 1951 to 1954, representing the Social Democratic Party of Finland (SDP).
