= Jalmari Malmi =

Finnish politician (1893–1943)

Jalmari Malmi (25 September 1893 in Virolahti – 27 November 1943) was a Finnish politician. He was a member of the Parliament of Finland from 1921 to 1922, representing the Agrarian League.
