= Jari Jääskeläinen =

Finnish ice hockey player (born 1981)

- Born: August 23, 1981 (age 44) Jyväskylä, Finland
- Height: 6 ft 0 in (183 cm)
- Weight: 187 lb (85 kg; 13 st 5 lb)
- Position: Forward
- Shot: Left
- Playing career: 2000–2013

Jari Jääskeläinen (born 23 August 1981) is a Finnish former professional ice hockey player who last played for JYP of the SM-liiga.
