= Jari Laukkanen =

Jari Laukkanen may refer to:

- Jari Laukkanen (cross-country skier) (1962–2019), Finnish cross-country skier
- Jari Laukkanen (ice hockey) (born 1967), Finnish ice hockey defenceman and coach
- Jari Laukkanen (curler) (born 1965), Finnish curler, team leader at the 2002 Winter Olympics
